= Timeline of Leicester =

Coordinates: 52.633333°N 1.133333°W

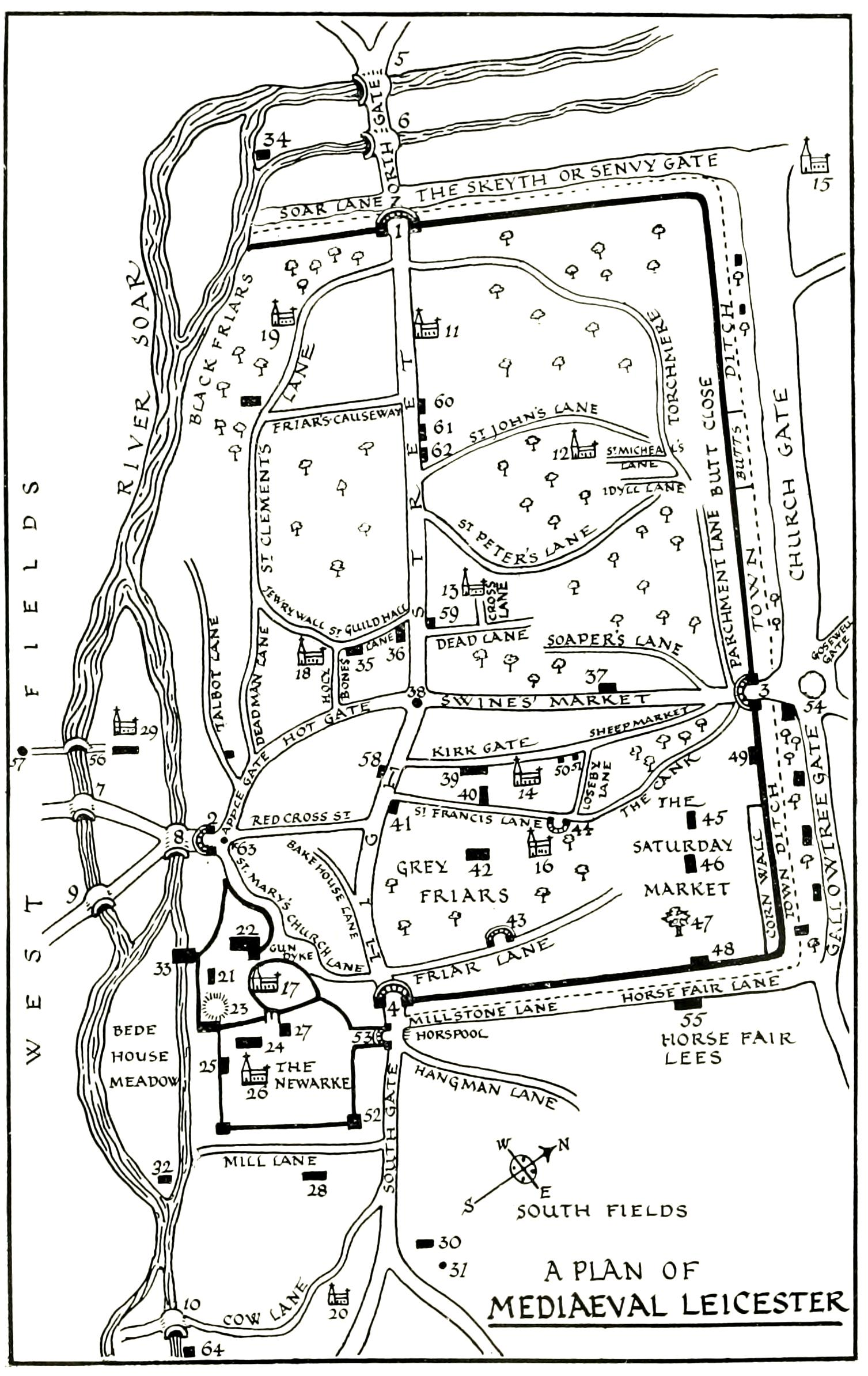
Charles J. Billson's plan of Leicester Old Town with the town walls, gates, and other landmarks clearly marked

Key historic sites of Leicester Old Town overlaid onto a modern map of the city. The Roman and medieval walls are marked by the dotted line. The one surviving Roman ruin is marked in purple. The secular sites are in blue. The towns five surviving ancient churches are in red. The dissolved mendicant and chantry foundations are in black. The key site of Leicester Abbey over the river is beyond the borders of the map to the north east.

The following is a timeline of the history of the city of Leicester, the county town of Leicestershire, in England.

== Prehistory ==
=== Palaeolithic ===
- c. 12,000 BC – Ice sheets retreated helping to form the geography of the Soar Valley.
- c. 10,000–9,500 BC – First hunter gatherers active in the Leicester area. Flint axe heads from the Early Stone Age have been found on Abbey Meadows, in Scraptoft, and in Eyres Monsell.

=== Mesolithic ===
- 9,500–4,500 BC – Late hunter gatherers active in the area. Stone tools found at Humberstone and Mowmacre Hill.

=== Neolithic ===
- 4,500–2,500 BC – Farming begins in the area and forests are cleared. More than 50 axes and other worked flint tools have been discovered scattered across every part of the city and its suburbs.

=== Copper Age ===
- 2,500–2,000 BC - pottery craft was discovered.

=== Bronze Age ===
- 2,000-1,000 BC
  - Metal working begins: metal remains found in High Street, Abbey Meadows, Eyres Monsell, and Glenfield. Pottery remains have been found in Glenfield in large quantities, as well as in Western Park and the modern city centre.
  - Evidence of ritual areas, crop marks and burial mounds, survive in Western Park and New Parks (for pre Roman Leicester religion see Druidism).
  - Burial area near High Street with a crematorium urn and another crematorium urn from Aylestone Park.
- 1,000 BC – earliest permanent settlement on Glenfield Ridge overlooking Soar Valley from the west (today Glenfield).

== Iron Age Period ==
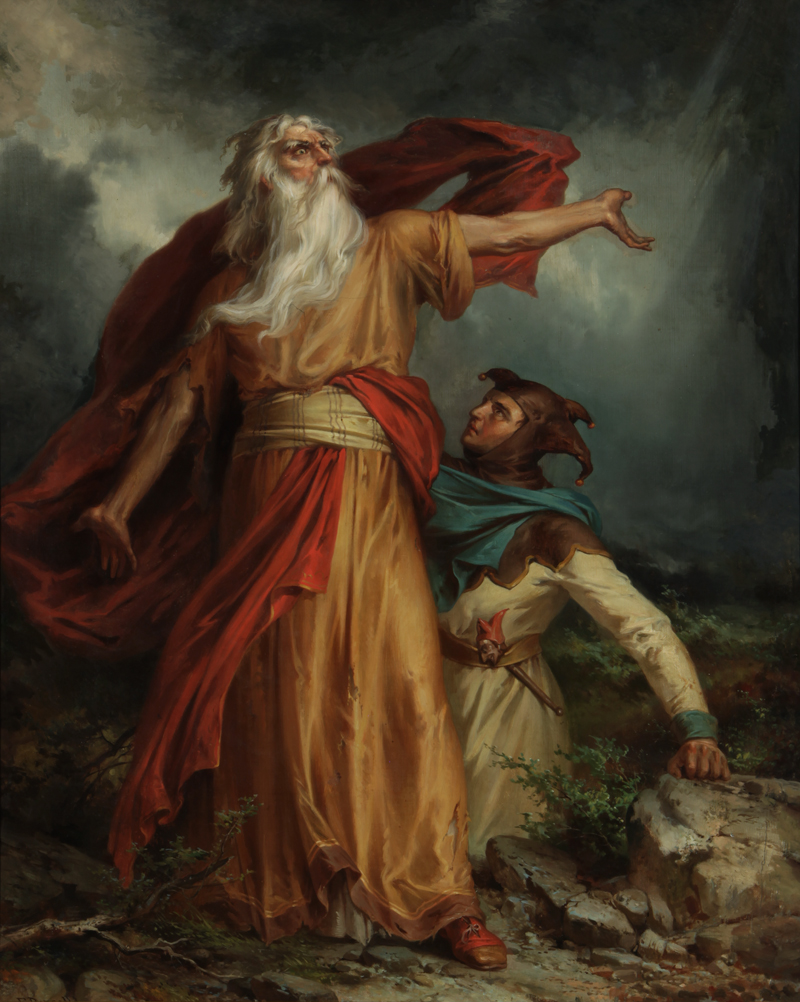
Leicester's mythical founder King Leir depicted by George Frederick Bensell

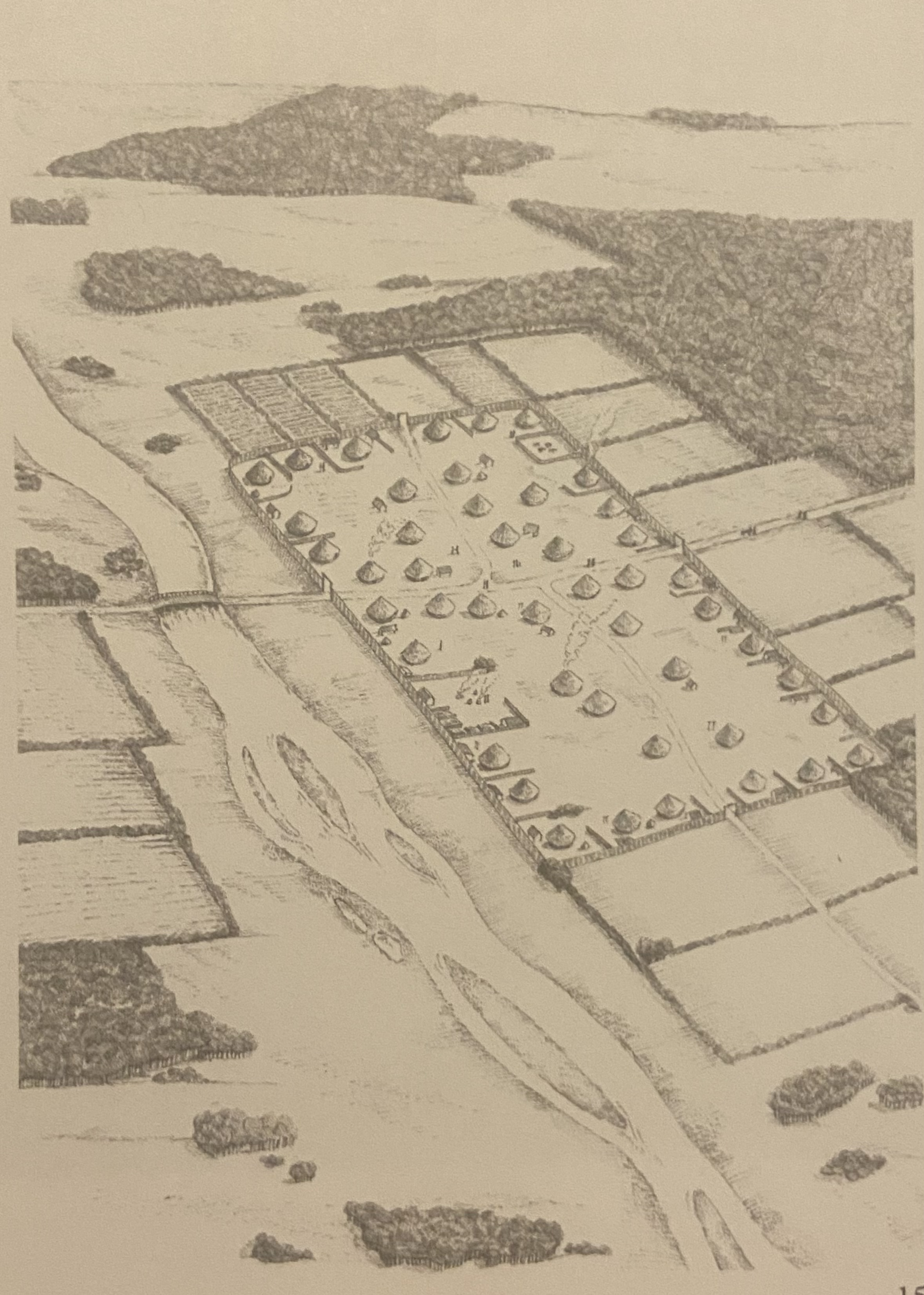
Iron Age Oppidum on the site of modern Leicester depicted from the south

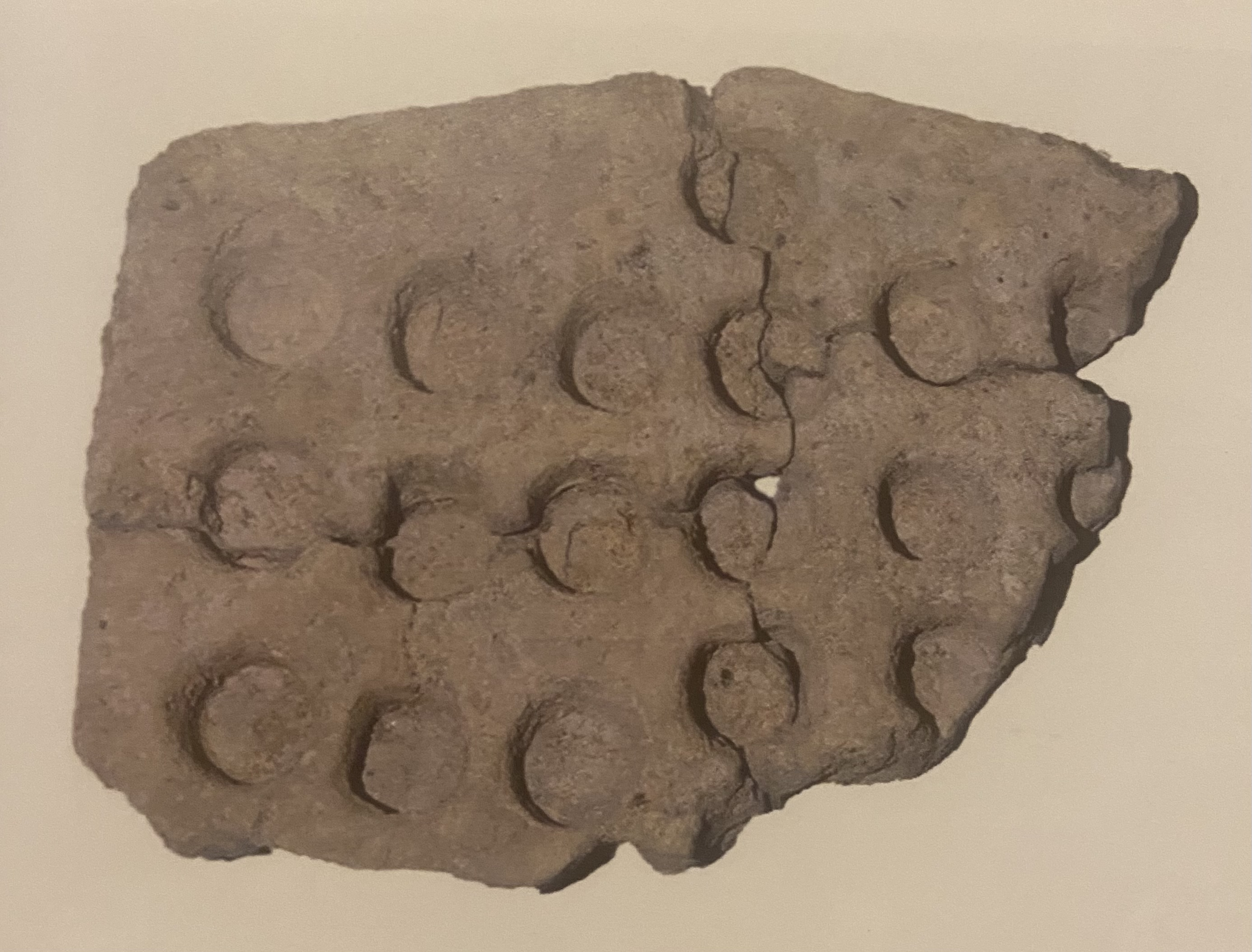
Clay coin mint discovered at Leicester

- c. 750 BC – Legendary foundation by King Leir according to Geoffrey of Monmouth's work Historia Regum Britanniae. This origin myth dates to the 12th cent and is based on Lier's name. There are no archaeological remains of a settlement on the eastern bank of the Soar to support the legend.
- c. 200 BC — Hill forts present at Ratby, Beacon Hill, Burrough Hill, and Breedon on the Hill.
- c. 100–50 BC – the Corieltauvi Tribe develop an oppidum on the eastern bank of the River Soar.
  - The settlement had the northernmost Iron Age coin mint yet discovered in Europe.

== Roman period ==
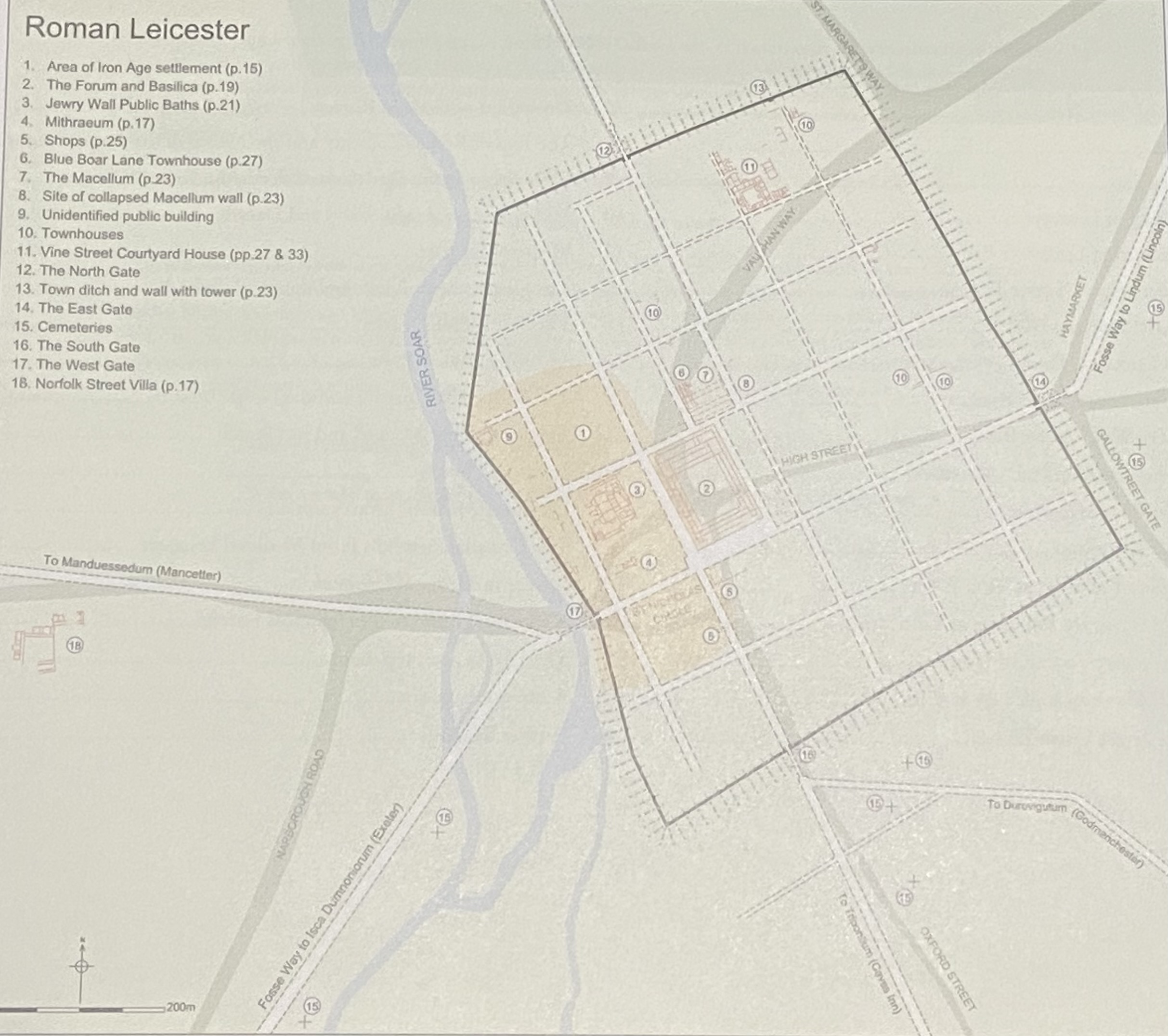
Map of Ratae Corieltavorum

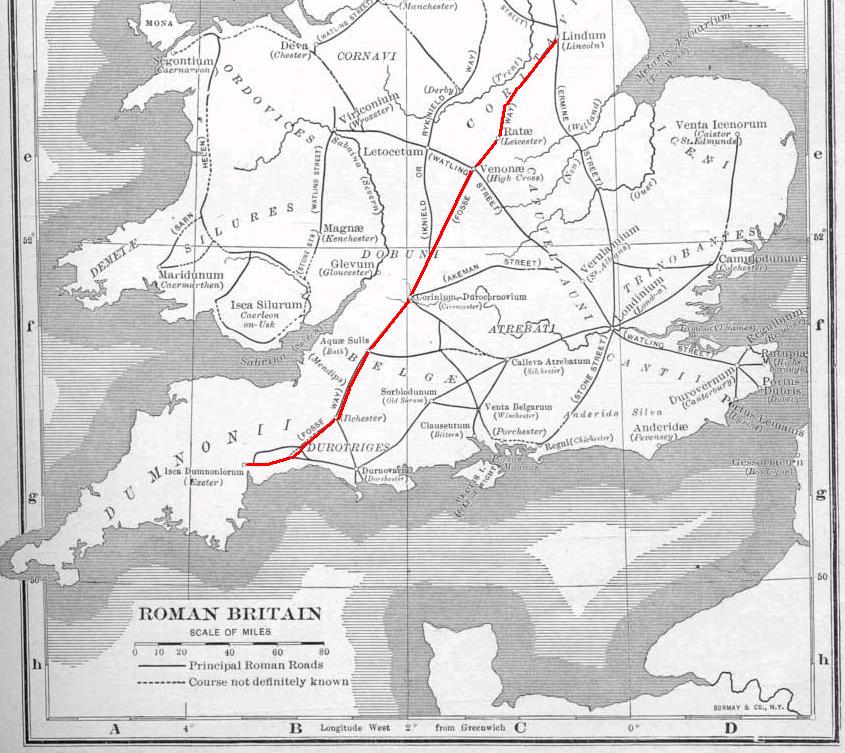
The route of the Fosse Way

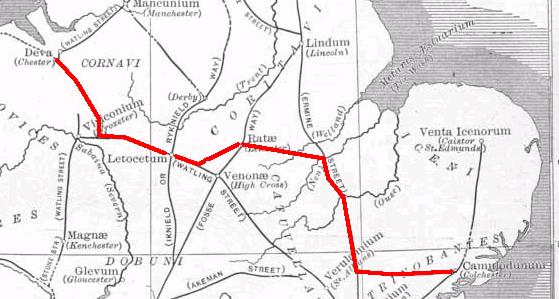
The route of the Via Devana

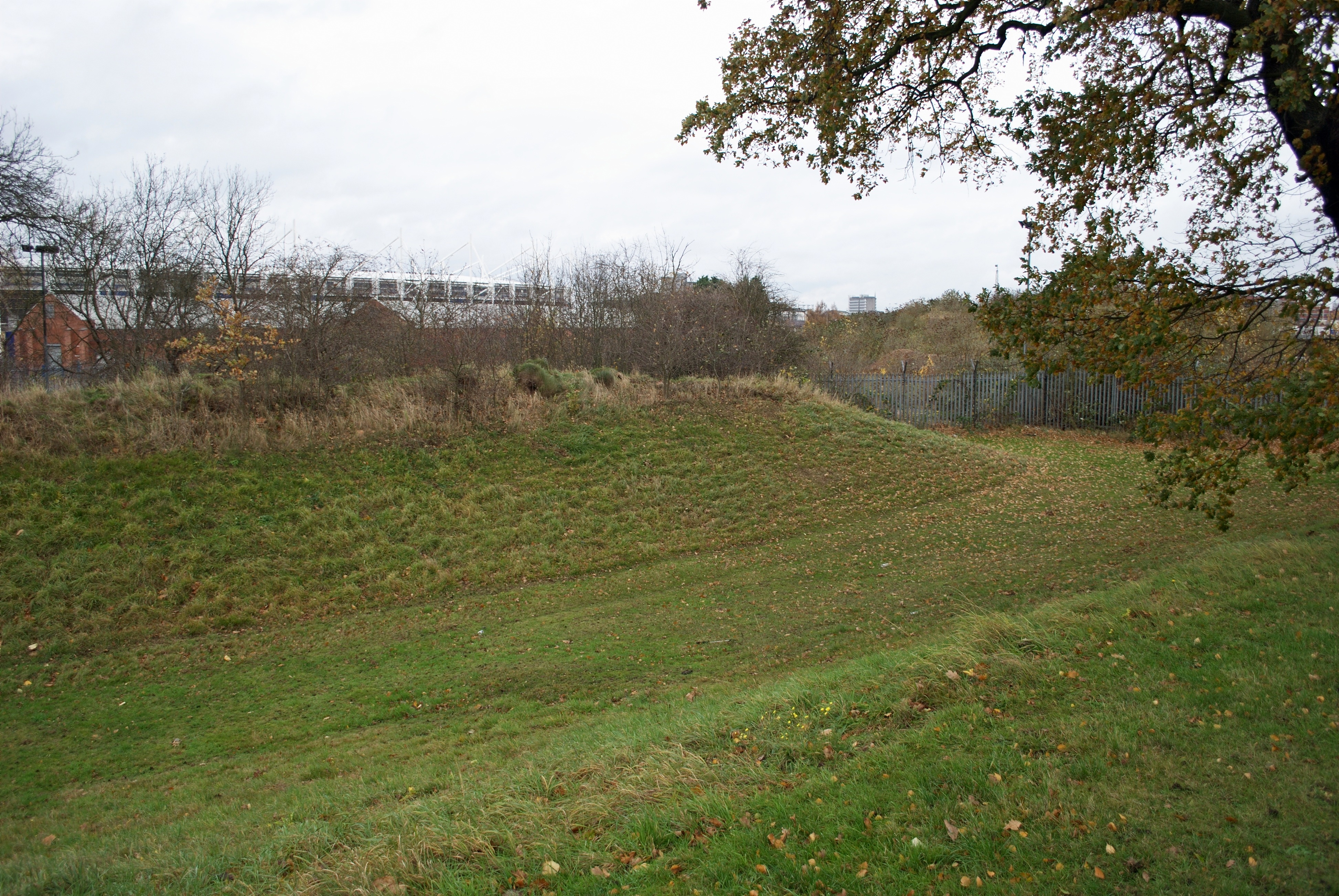
The Raw Dykes

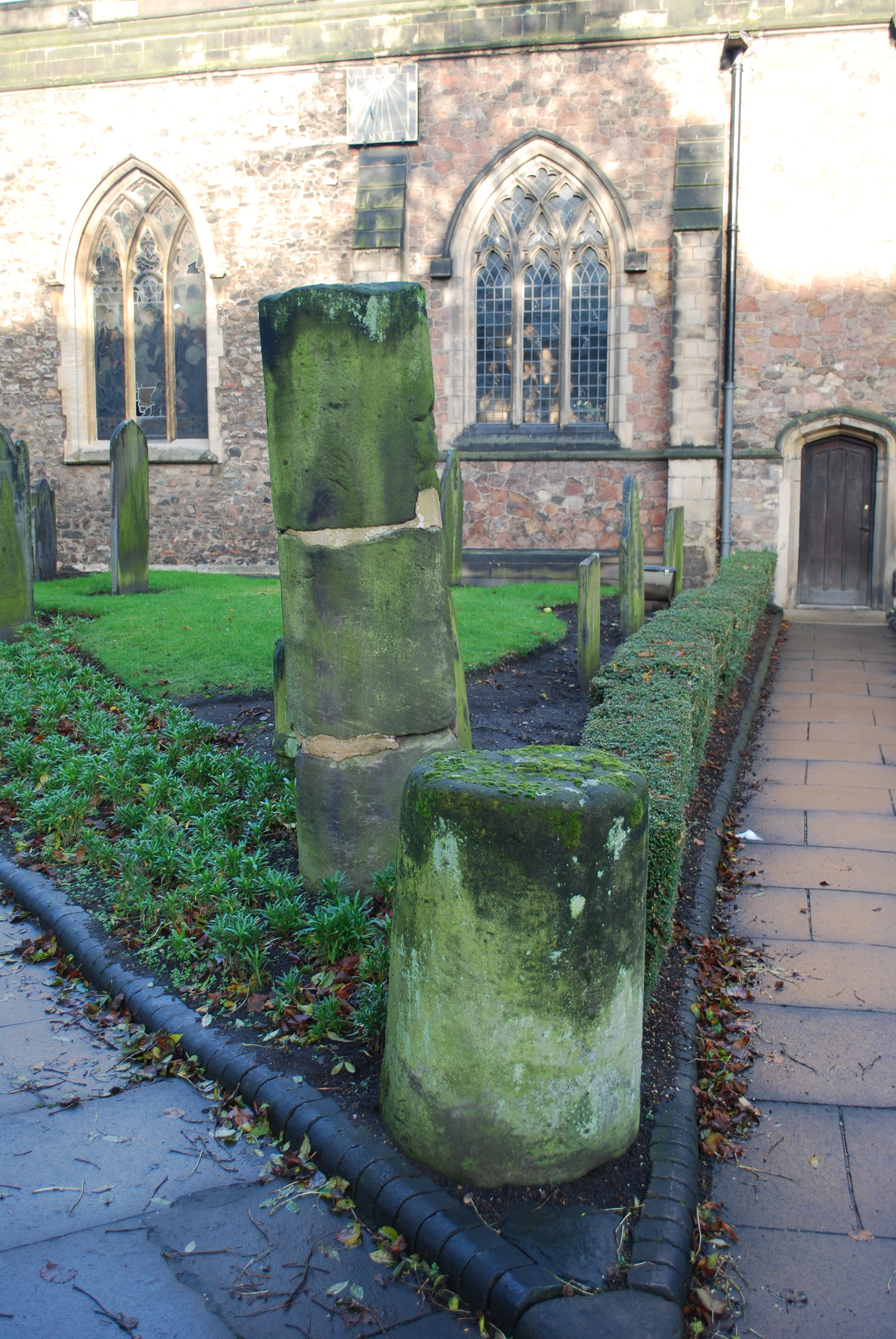
Remains of columns from Ratae's Roman Forum in St Nicholas churchyard

=== 1st century CE (AD) ===
- 44–46 – Roman Conquest of the area by Legio XIV Gemina under Aulus Plautius.
- c. 48–60 – The Corieltauvi become allied with Rome (approx. date):
  - Tribespeople were made Civitas stipendaria of the Roman Empire.
  - The gradually Romanising settlement of Ratae Corieltauvorum (meaning Ramparts of the Corieltauvi) was recognised as the Corieltauvi's Civitas Capital. The plural conjugation of the name Ratae might have either referred to the different sided ramparts of a single oppidum or to the ramparts of several oppida surrounding the main one excavated east of the River Soar.
- c. 48 – The Fosse Way was constructed just to the north of the original Iron Age oppidum, perhaps initially as a defensive ditch. The northern most boundary of the first wave of Romano-British occupied territories, it came to be a major route of transportation connecting Lincoln to the north east and Cirencester, Bath, and Exeter to the south west. It was also came to act as the Decumanus Maximus (principal street running east to west) of the city of Ratae. Outside the city walls the Fosse way is the road northeast to Belgrave, Syston, and Melton (today's A46), and southwest to Coventry (today's B4455 and A429) until the mid 20th century. In the 18th and 19th the areas around the Fosse Way had been developed while the straight road was preserved as today's:
  - Narborough Road,
  - Belgrave Gate
  - Belgrave Road (the Golden Mile),
  - and Melton Road.
- c. 51 — Watling Street constructed about 12 miles south of the city connecting Canterbury, London, and St Albans in the south east with Wroxeter in the north west, later extending to Chester. This road followed the route of today's A5 and marks the border between Leicestershire and Warwickshire.
- c. 70 – The Via Devana is gradually constructed connecting Ratae to the Roman capital Colchester in the south east and Chester in the north west vier Watling Street. This road eventually constituted the southern section of Ratae's divided Cardo Maximus (principal street running north to south) connecting what is still Southgates with the old Forum (roughly today's Jubilee Square) vier Vaughan Way before joining the Fosse way in the western half of the Decumanus Maximus, exiting vier the former West Gates, and continuing towards Mancetter where it met Watling Street. To the south east it passed through Medbourne to Godmanchester. The route survives today as
  - Gartree Road (the B582 passing through the Strettons),
  - Evington Footway,
  - New Walk,
  - and Glenfield Road (possibly).
- c. 75–99 – A drainage ditch, most likely with a defensive rampart of some kind, was dug around an area enclosing the original Iron Age oppidum. The north to south ditches measured about 805 metres and from east to west 670 metres enclosing 53 hectares (130 acres). These boundaries will mark the site of the 3rd century stone walls and the boroughs boundaries with very few changes until the 19th century. Within the boundaries of the outer ditch a gridded network of streets (cardines, decumani, and insulae) were laid out, including the split Cardo Maximus and the continuous Decumanus Maximius.
  - The route the Cardo Maximus followed is now:
    - South Gates;
    - The short footpath continuous with Wyggeston's House as far as Applegate (the route of the Decumanus, i.e. the Fosse Way);
    - The route of the present Highcross Street over Vaughn Way as far as Sanvey Gate and Soar Lane.
  - The Decumanus Maximius, following the route of the 48 AD Fosse Way, is now:
    - East Gates opposite the Haymarket and Belgrave Gate;
    - Silver Street;
    - Guildhall lane past Wyggeston's House and Jubilee Square;
    - beneath St Nicolas Circle to the lost west gate around St Augustine's Road.
  - The Raw Dykes were likely constructed during this stage of development.

=== 2nd century ===
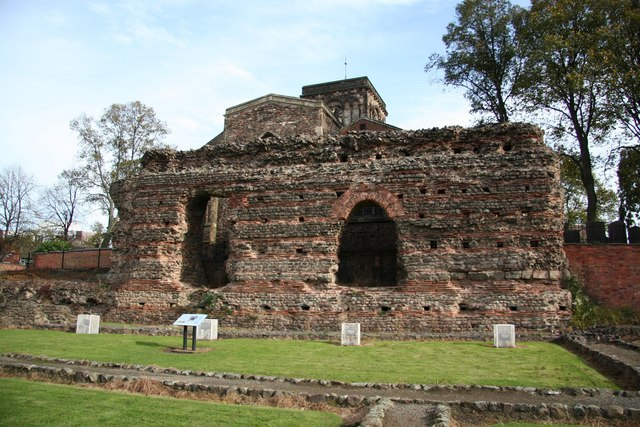
Jewry Wall, the only substantial free standing survival of Ratae

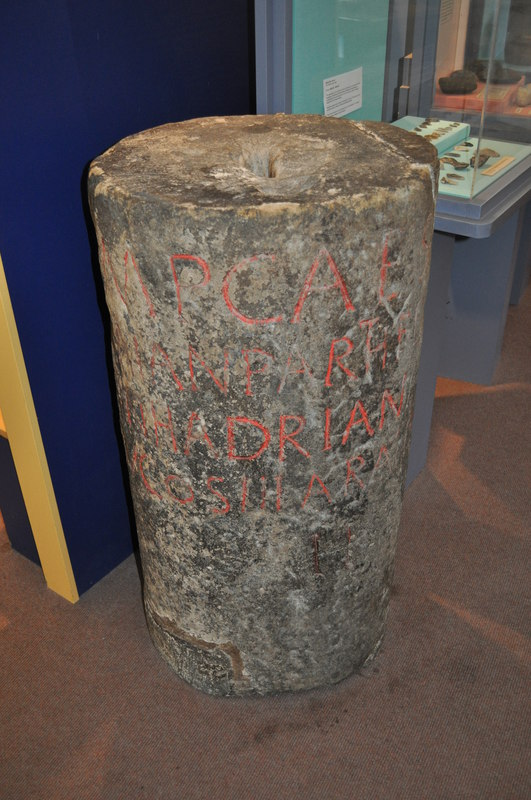
The Thurmaston Milestone in Jewry Wall Museum

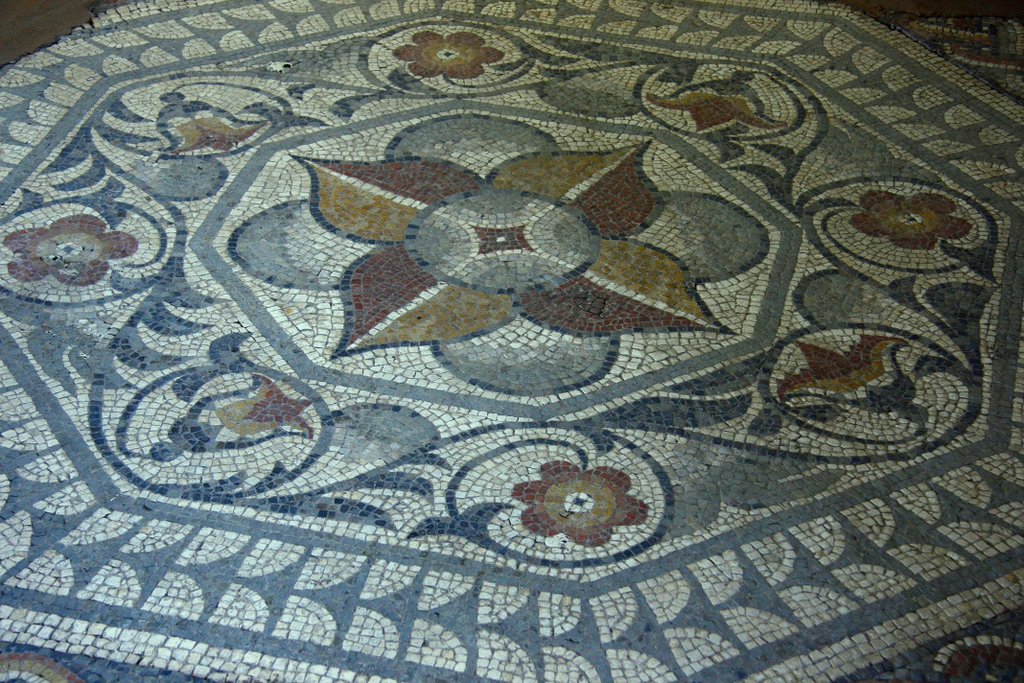
Part of one of the Blackfriars Pavements

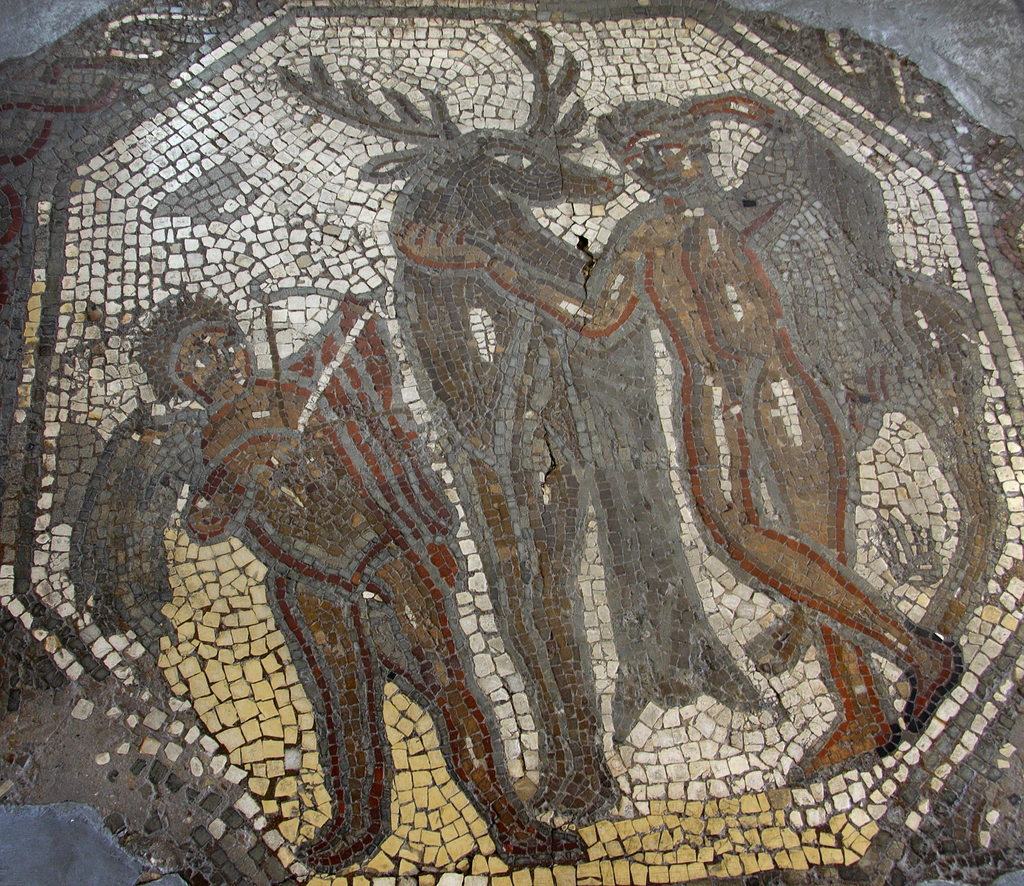
Mosaic of Cyparissus

- 120 – the Emperor Hadrian visited Ratae.
  - The Thurmaston Milestone was erected, inscribed with Hadrians name.
- c. 130–200 – Ratae developed into well established Municipium:
  - The Forum and Basilica complex were constructed on the north side of the Fosse Way between what is presently Highcross Street and Vaughan Way. The site is now Jubilee Square.
  - Thermae (public bath house) constructed. Ruins preserved in the courtyard of Jewry Wall Museum.
  - Jewry Wall constructed, the wall of a communal Palaestra or Gymnasium constructed on the eastern side of the bath complex, the archways are likely the surviving entry between the exercise hall and the baths.
  - The Mithraeum, a temple to the deity Mithra, was constructed on what is now St Nicholas Circle.
  - The "Cyparissus Pavement" laid (approx. date).
  - The four "Blackfriars Pavements" laid (approx. date).
  - The "Peacock Pavement" laid (approx. date).

=== 3rd century ===
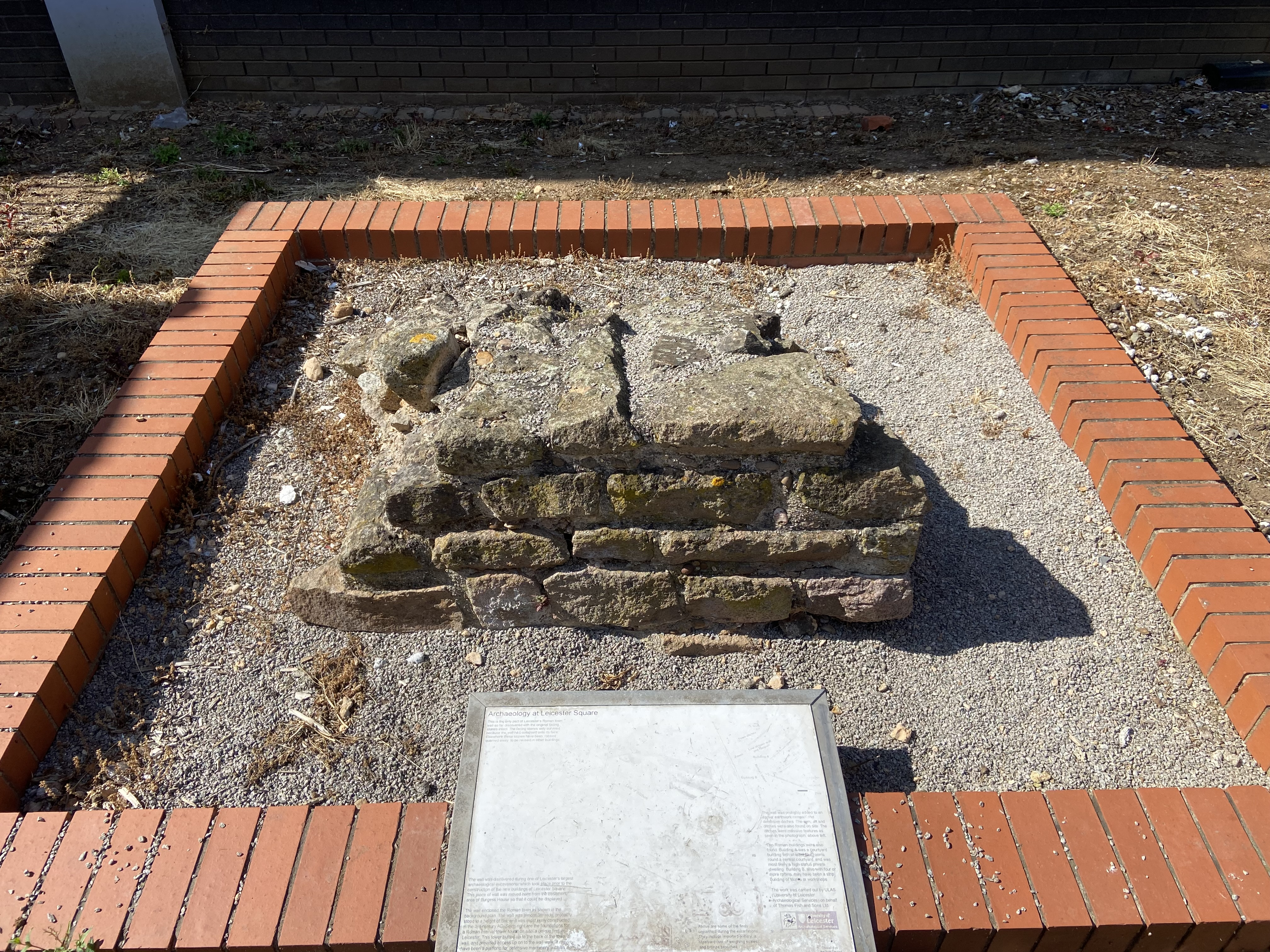
Remains of Ratae's old northern defensive wall on Junior Street

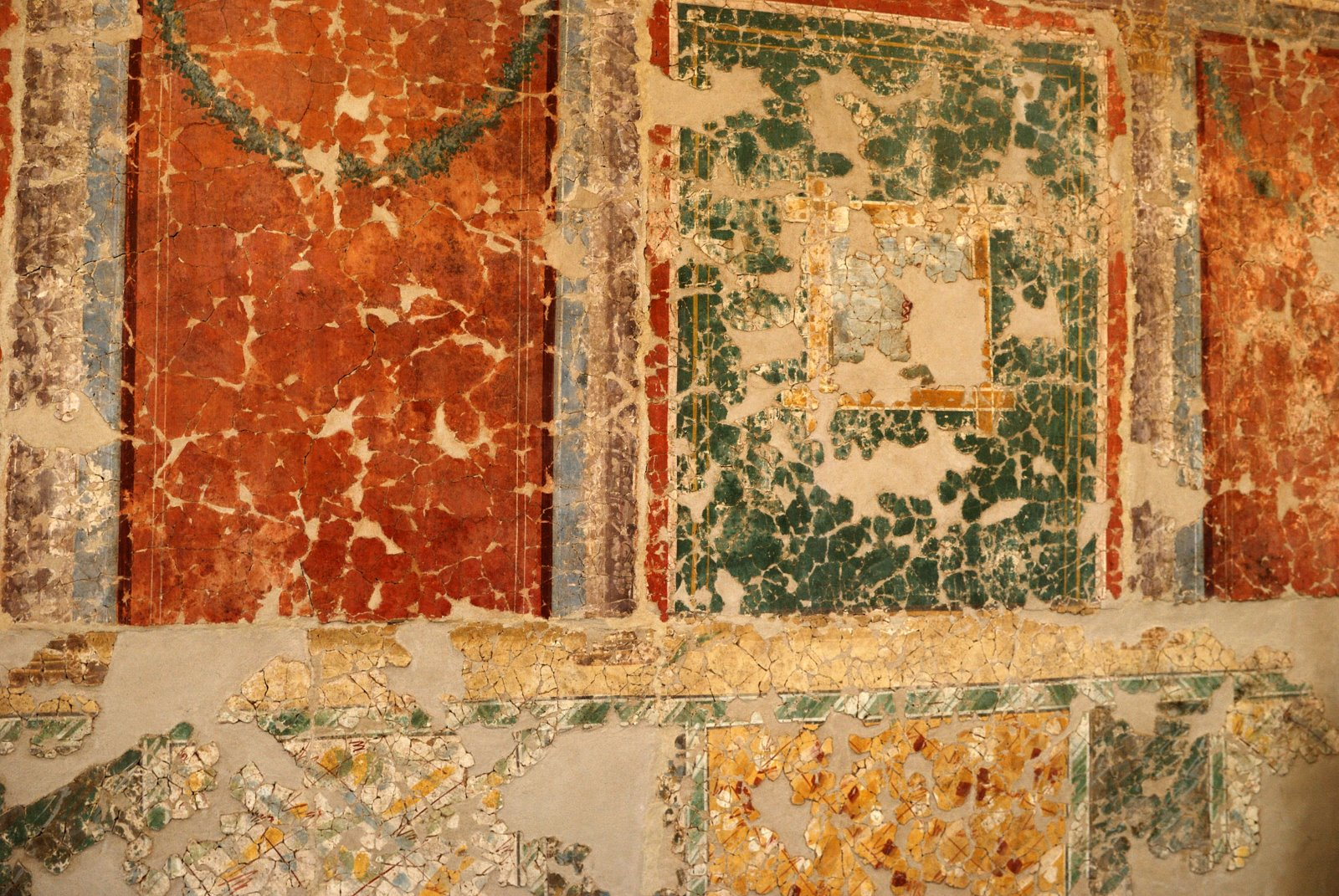
The Norfolk Street Wall Paintings

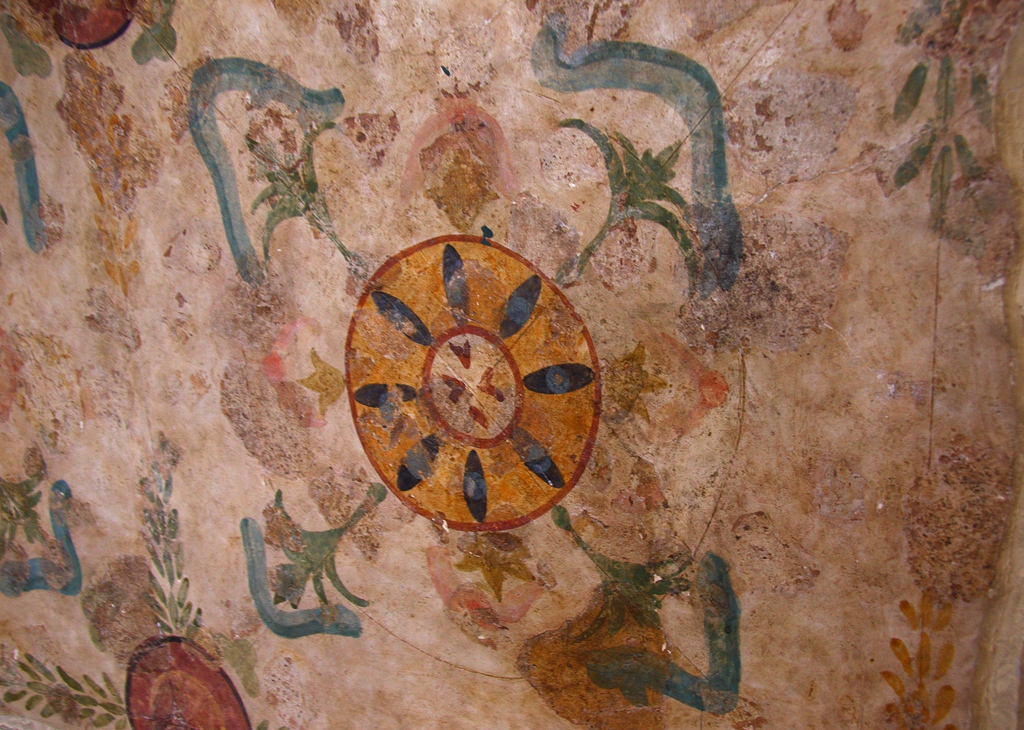
Detail from a Roman wall painting found in Leicester

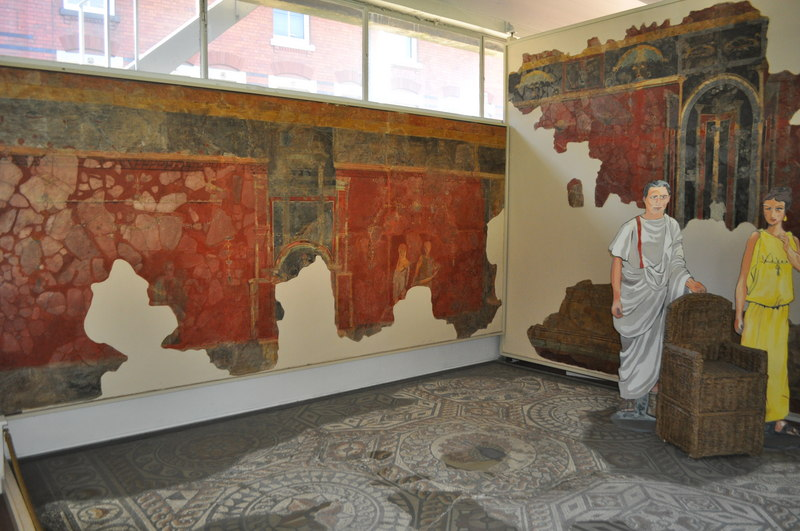
Roman wall paintings from Ratae and the Peacock Pavement

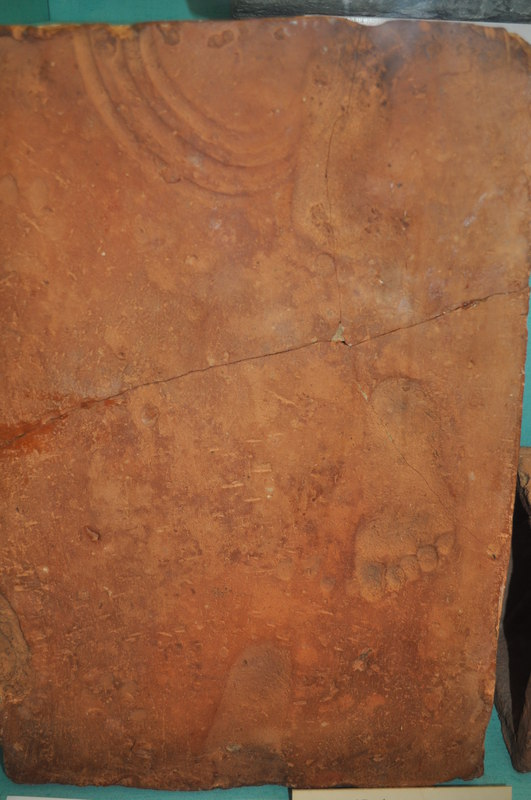
Roman tile from Ratae showing babies foot print

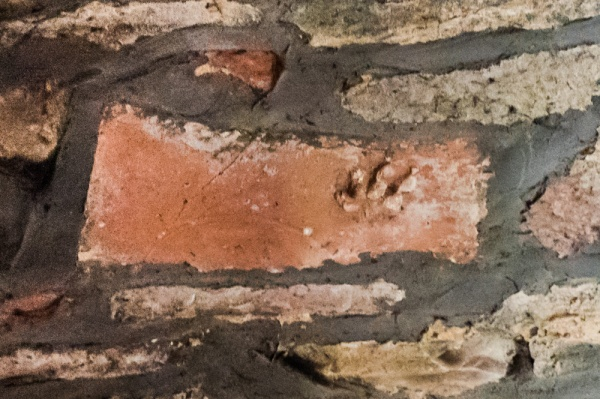
Roman tile from Ratae showing a dogs paw print. Encased in the nave wall of St Nicholas Church

- c. 208 – Emperor Septimius Severus likely visited Ratae during his journey to Hadrians Wall for the Caledonian Campaign.
- c. 220 – Civic buildings expand:
  - Large Macellum (indoor market hall) constructed immediately to the north of the Forum, around the site of the Medieval Blue Boar Inn in between today's Highcross Street, Vaughan Way, and Jubilee Square.
  - Semi circular Theatrum constructed adjacent to the north wall of the Macellum (today under Vaughan Way).
  - A Septisolium shrine was probably constructed around this time according surviving written testimony and some possible archaeological evidence. Inspired by the Roman Septisolium, although on a far smaller scale, it was devoted to the seven planetary deities (Saturn, Sol, Luna, Mars, Mercury, Jupiter, and Venus).
- c. 270 — City walls constructed in stone along the route of the earlier ditches (see entry for c. 80–99 AD above). Stone defensive structures remain until the 16th century and surviving stones can be seen reused in the wall between St Mary de Castro churchyard and the gardens of the Newarke Houses Museum.
  - The entrance roads and tracks along the walls extern have almost all survived as thoroughfares in the modern city. Working round the boundary, to and from the focal point of the Victorian Haymarket Memorial Clock Tower, and starting from East Gates these are:
    - Gallowtree Gate,
    - Horsefair Street,
    - Millstone Lane,
    - past Southgates and Vaughan way,
    - The Newarke, particularly the south wall of the 11th century Leicester Castle,
    - Castle Gardens,
    - St Nicholas Circle,
    - Bath Lane,
    - Soar Lane,
    - past Northgate and Highcross Streets,
    - Sanvey Gate,
    - and Church Gate.
  - The walls had four major gateways of which no visible remains survive. Three of them have been preserved in the names of the streets. They were:
    - South Gate – today commemorated in the street name Southgates, they stood roughly where Millstone Lane meets Vaughan Way. Two roads branched from here; the Via Devana to Medbourne and Godmanchester, and an unnamed road to the local settlement of Tripontium on Watling Street (now the Caves Inn near Lutterworth). The Newarke Street Cemetery grew up in between the two forks in the road.
    - East Gate – today East Gates, it stood roughly between Cheapside and Gallowtree Gate. This was the eastern entrance of the Fosse Way (Belgrave Gate and Melton Road) into the city and the road to Lincoln. In the Middle Ages the two tracks following the east wall became Church Gate to the north leading up to St Margaret's and Gallowtree Gate to the south leading up to the gallows where the track met the Via Divana at the top of St Mary's Hill (opposite the Victoria Park gates on London Road).
    - North Gate – today the crossroads of Highcross Street, Northgate Street, Sanvey Gate, and Soar Lane. In the Middle Ages the road to Leicester Abbey and a procession route between St Martins Church (the cathedral) and St Margaret's Church (Sanvey Gate being an Anglo Saxon distortion of the Latin Sacra Via or Holy Way).
    - West Gate – today where St Augustine's Road meets St Nicholas Circle. The onward route of both the Fosse Way (Narborough Road) to Bath and Exeter and the Via Devana (possibly Glenfield Road).

=== 4th century ===
- 300 – roughly the time the provinces of Britain were reorganised. Ratae fell into the province of Flavia Caesariensis, its capital being at Lincoln.
- 360 – major fire destroyed the public baths and many other buildings never to be rebuilt.
- c. 375 — Antonine Itinerary records Ratae on a postal route between London and Lincoln.

=== 5th century ===
- 406–420 — End of Roman occupation beginning around 406 with the departure of many unpaid centurions and the rise of Constantine III.

== Anglo-Saxon period ==
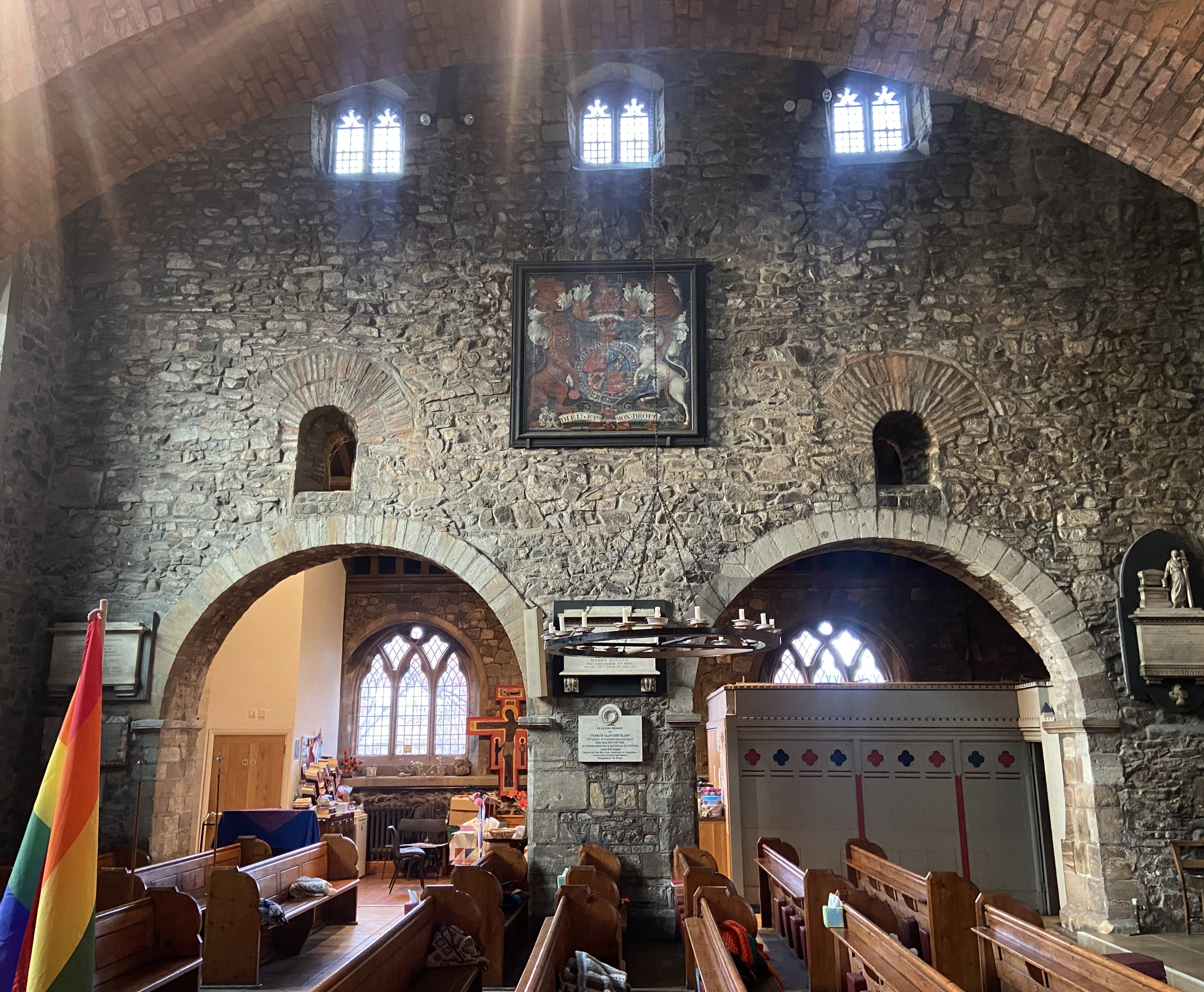
North wall of the nave of St Nicholas Church. Constructed c. 870

=== 6th century ===
- c. 515 — Icel, King of the Angles, led his tribe across the North Sea to settle in the Trent and Soar Valleys. In time this came to include a small settlement on the edge of the old Roman city of Ratae, near Southgates.

=== 7th century ===
- 653 — Saint Cedd undertook a mission to the Mercian Middle Angles with three companions, Adda, Betti, and Diuma. The mission was instigated by the baptism of Prince Peada, son of the famous warrior Penda King of Mercia, prior to his marriage to Elfleda daughter of Oswiu. This marked the beginning of the conversion of the territories around the Tame, Trent, and Soar Valleys to Christianity.
- 655 — Diuma appointed first Bishop of the Mercians. Leicester's early church was initially ministered from Lichfield.
- 669 — Theodore of Tarsus, Archbishop of Canterbury, appointed Saint Chad Bishop of the Mercians.
- 679 — Cuthwine was installed as the first Bishop of Leicester, separating Leicester from the See of Lichfield. Part of wider reforms by Archbishop Theodore and King Ethelred of Mercia.
  - Possible foundation date of the first church on the site of St Margaret's.

=== 8th century ===
- 792 - Bishop Unwona of Leicester accompanies King Offa of Mercia (of Offa's Dyke fame) on pilgrimage to Rome.

=== Early 9th century (800-870's) ===
- 803 — Earliest Saxon written record of the town, referred to as Legorensis Caester.
- 810 – King Kenulf, father of the famous Saint Kenelm, purportedly issued the foundation charter of Crowland Abbey at Leicester. Ceolwulf, brother of Kenulph, Wulfred, Archbishop of Canterbury, and Unwona, Bishop of Leicester, were apparently signatory witnesses. The source of this claim is the unreliable Chronicle of Crowland Abbey and cannot be accurate since Unwona died in the first years of the 9th century and had been succeeded in the See of Leicester by Wernbeorht by 803. However, it has been taken as evidence for the presence of the Mercian royal household at Leicester during the period.
- 840 – According to local tradition Saint Wigstan, a young prince of Mercia, was martyred at Wistow just south of the city on the Kalends of June (1 June).
- c. 870 – The nave of St Nicholas' Church dates to about this time (next to Jewry Wall, approx. date).

== Viking Period ==
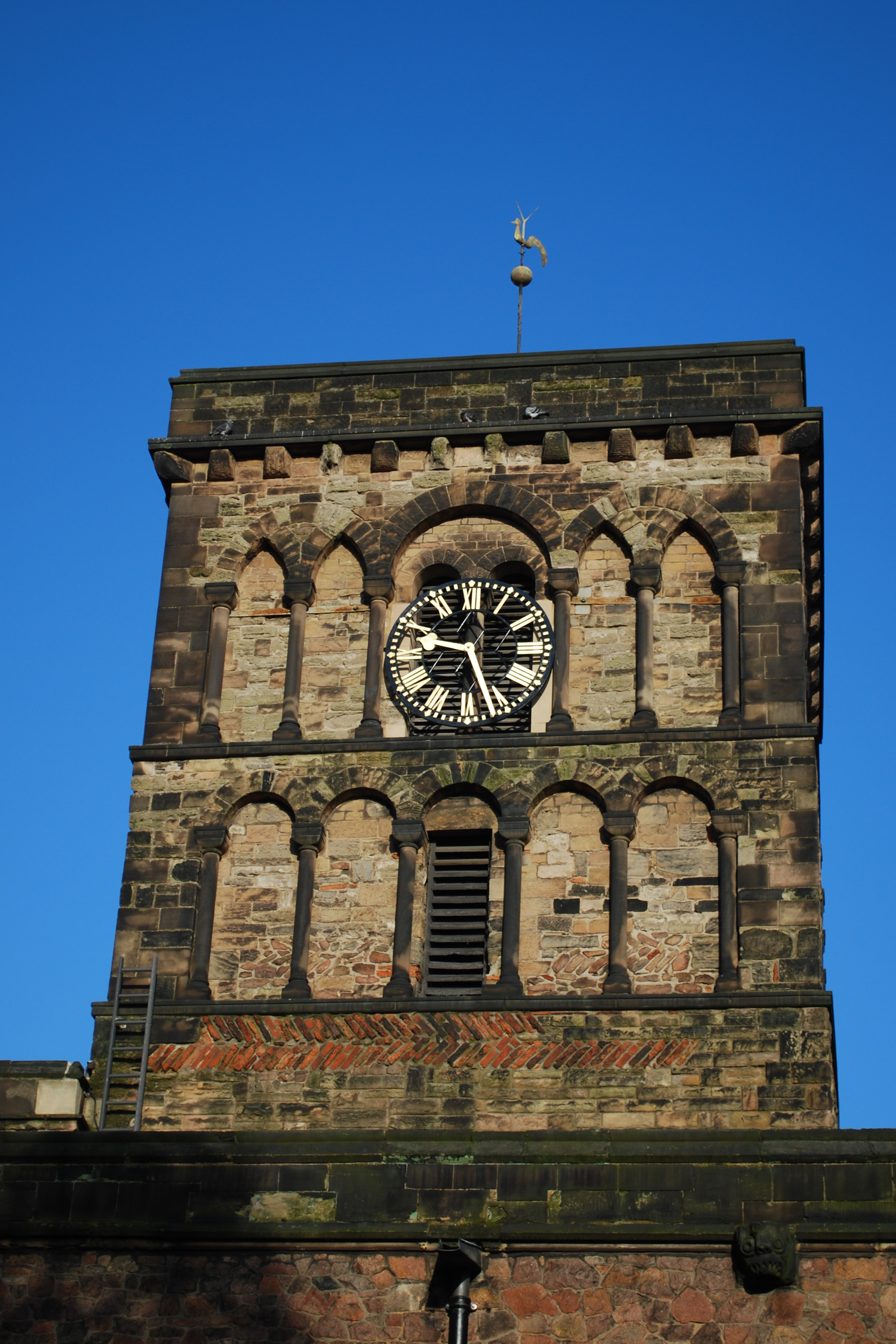
St Nicholas tower. The lower arcade was constructed sometime during the 900s after the Danes converted. The upper arcade is 11th cent. Norman

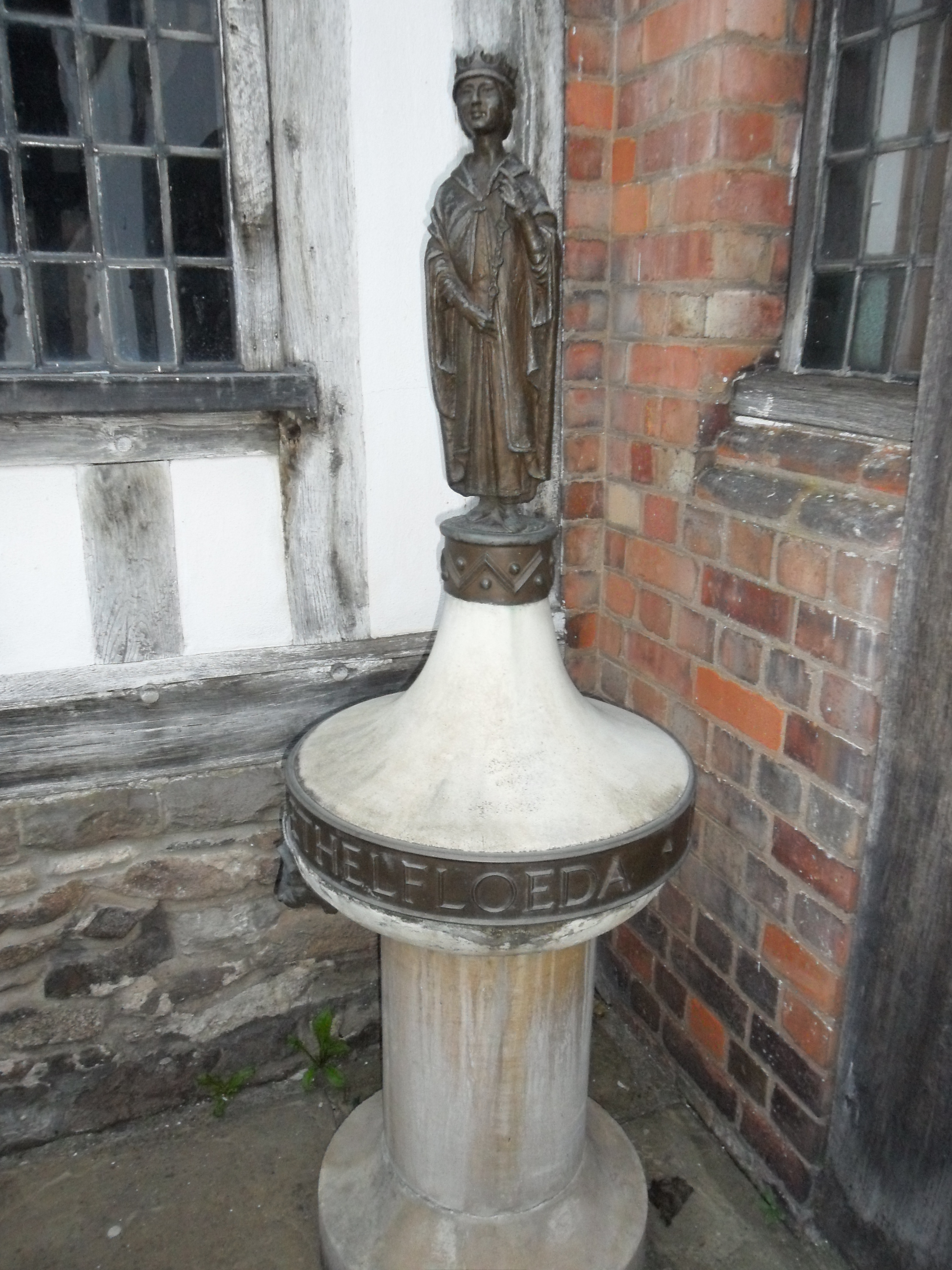
Memorial of Lady Ethelfleda in Leicester Guildhall courtyard

=== Late 9th Century (870-899) ===
- 874 – Leicester ceased to be a diocesan seat when Ceobred, the last of the ancient Bishops of Leicester, fled the invading Great Heathen Army (the Vikings). He settled at Dorchester where his office was united with the bishoprics of Dorchester and Lindsey. His eventual Norman successor Remigius de Fécamp moved the ancient amalgamated see to Lincoln in 1072 where the office became known as the Bishopric of Lincoln.
- 878 – The Viking Danish dominance in Leicester and the rest of the Danelaw was formally recognised by the Anglo Saxons in the Treaty of Wedmore, an agreement between Alfred the Great and Guthrum. Leicester and it's nearest neighbouring towns in Viking Mercia came to be known as the Five Boroughs of the Danelaw.

=== 10th century ===
- 918 – The city's Viking defenders surrender without a fight to Ethelfleda, Lady of the Mercians, and Edward the Elder, the children of Alfred the Great.
  - Towns defensive walls repaired.
  - St Mary's Church founded by Ethelfleda and Edward, the site of today's St Mary de Castro.
- c. 940-943 — Edmund I, son of Edward the Elder, and his Anglo Saxon forces besieged one King Olaf (either Olaf Guthfrithson or Olaf Sihtricson) and his Viking forces at Leicester. The year of the siege and treaty is unclear leading to a confusion about the characters involved. Olaf's court resident in Leicester at the time included Wulfstan (Archbishop of York 931-956). According to the Anglo Saxon Chronicle, the Viking forces were overwhelmed, with King Olaf and Archbishop Wulfstan escaping under cover of night. Other sources suggest the battle ended in stalemate.
  - In the aftermath a peace treaty was brokered between the two warring parties by Archbishop Wulfstan and, according to some sources, the Archbishop of Canterbury, either Wulfhelm (archbishop 926-941) or Saint Odo (archbishop from 941-958) with terms largely favourable to Edmund.
  - The treaty involved the Baptism of King Olaf with King Edmund as godfather, perhaps only a symbolic affirmation of the treaty as was common at the time, since the presence of Wulfstan in Olaf’s court suggests he was already a Christian.
  - The treaty formally recognised Olaf's rule over the Danelaw north of Watling Street (still the border of Leicestershire and Warwickshire) but in a dependency upon the Anglo Saxon Kings of England.
  - Some sources suggest the treaty stipulated that whichever of the two monarchs should outlive the other would inherit full authority over the Danelaw. When Edmund outlived King Olaf the Danelaw theoretically reverted to him.
- 971 — Bishops of Leicester in exile at Dorchester and Lindsey merged to form one bishopric.

=== Early 11th century ===
- 1013 – Sweyn Forkbeard invades East Mercia and receives the submission of the Five Boroughs. According to some sources this included a visit to Leicester. He was accompanied by one Olaf Haraldsson, now known as Saint Olaf, later King of Norway and a major figure in the story of Scandinavia's conversion to Christianity. The account is not based on any contemporary reference to a specific visit to Leicester but represent later conjecture based on references in the Peterborough Chronicle and the Legendary Saga of St. Olaf.
- 1015 – Edmund Ironside and his army seized Leicester following the murder of the brothers Sigeferth and Morcar, the thegns ruling the Five Boroughs of the Danelaw and received the Borough's submission.
- 1016 – Cnut retook Leicester part of the 1016 invasion of England.
  - Ironside again sacked Leicester during his counter campaign with Uhtred, Earl of Northumbria.
- c. 1042 – Under Edward the Confessor the borough paid £30 15s. annually plus honey, and its burgesses were obliged to send twelve men in the royal army and four horses in naval expeditions.

== Late 11th century ==
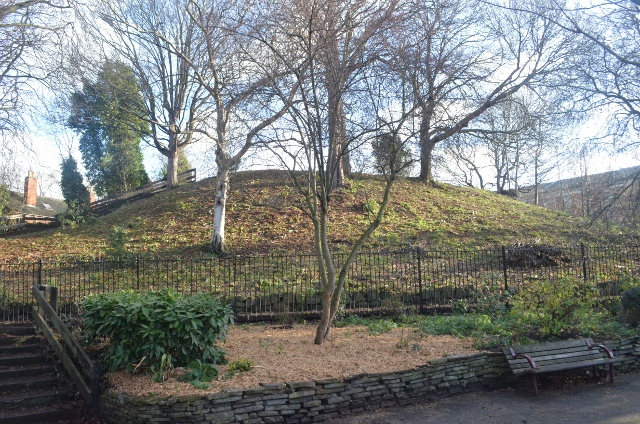
Motte of Leicester Castle constructed by the Normans

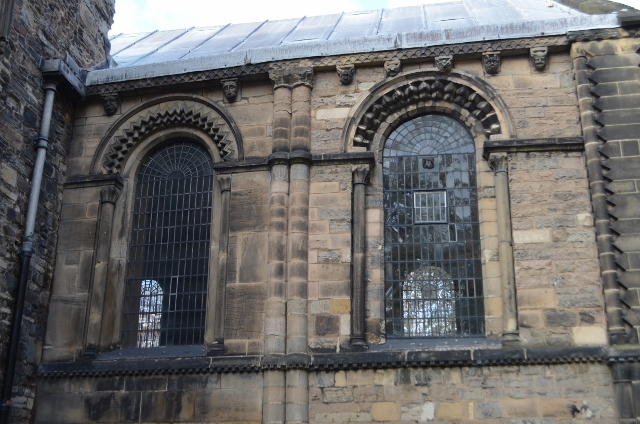
Norman stonework on St Mary de Castro.

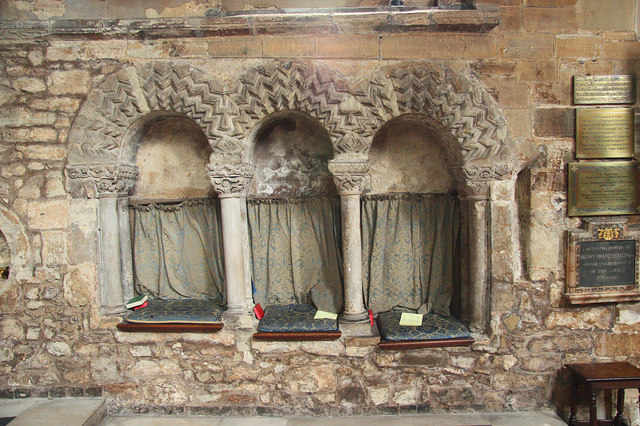
Norman Sedelia in St Mary de Castro

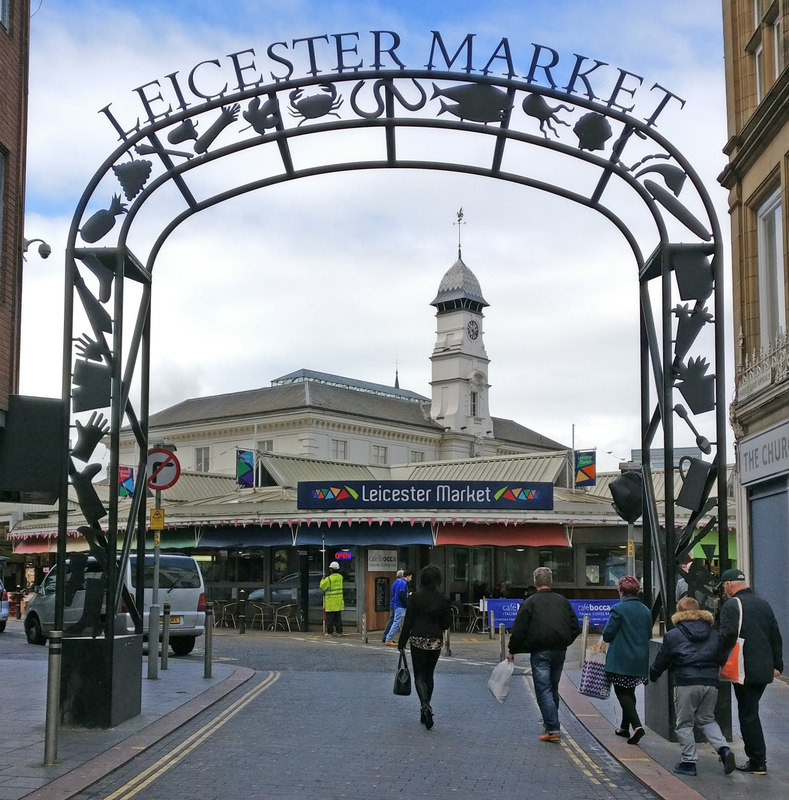
Leicester Market active since the Doomsday Survey of 1087, not necessarily on its present site which is first clearly recorded in 1298

- c. 1070 – The Norman Conquerors reached the city.
  - Hugh de Grandmesnil was granted the lands encompassing the town of Leicester and made first Sheriff of Leicestershire.
  - Motte and Bailey structure of Leicester Castle was begun.
  - St Mary's, now part of the castle Bailey, was reconstructed (including nave and west wall still standing).
- 1072 — The ancient bishopric of Dorchester, Leicester and Lindsey in exile, was moved to Lincoln under the new Norman bishop Remigius de Fécamp. Leicester and Leicestershires churches became part of the Diocese of Lincoln until 1837. During this period the Cathedral church of the town was Lincoln Cathedral.
- 1086 – The Domesday Survey report on the town of Ledecestre (Leicester):
  - The north to south walls of the town measured about 805 metres, from east to west 670 metres, the walls enclosing 53 hectares (130 acres).
  - 322 households.
    - 190 owned by Hugh de Grandmesnil
    - 39 in the possession of William the Conqueror and the Crown.
    - 93 in other hands.
  - The Bishops Fee estate outside the north and east walls of the town (including the suburbs of Gallowtree Gate, Humberstone Gate, and Belgrave Gate) held by the Bishop of Lincoln.
  - An estimated population of 1,278. (Note: This figure was the result of later estimates based on households.)
  - The town was a Free Borough outside the jurisdiction of any of the Leicestershire Hundreds and operated along principles of pre-conquest Danish law.
    - There were 65 Burgesses or Freemen, the ancestor of the current Guild of Leicester Freemen and the established core of the towns Burgher class.
    - The town was governed by a Portmanmoot of 24 Jurats elected from among the Burgesses (the ancestor of the 1589 Corporation & the modern City Council).
  - Leicester Market (known as the Saturday Shambles) was active.
  - The walled town had several churches of which 5 survive:
    - St Nicholas Church, the old Anglo Saxon Minster dating back to the 6th or 7th century constructed in the shell of the old Roman Gymnasium;
    - St Mary de Castro in the precincts of Leicester Castle;
    - All Saints on Highcross Street, the northern section of the old Roman city's split Cardo Maximus, the first church reached on entering the North Gate;
    - St Margaret's Church, just outside the north eastern corner of the walls at the crossroads of Sanvey Gate and Church Gate;
    - & St Martin's Church, constructed on Fosse Way, the city's old Decumanus Maximus, roughly midway between the East and West Gates;
  - And three churches which do not:
    - St Clement's Church, later the Blackfriars Church in the northwest corner of the town;
    - St Michael's Church, in the northeast corner of the town around what is today Vaughan Way, Burgess Street, and East Bond Street;
    - & St Peter's Church, near what is now Free School Lane, its stones surviving in the structure of the Free School.
  - Leicester Castle was completed.
- 1092 – First recorded existence of the Archdeaconry of Leicester. Title held by Ranulph appointed by Bishop Remigius.
- 1098 — Hugh de Grandmesnil died and Ivo de Grandmesnil inherits his Leicester territory and titles:
  - Hugh died at Leicester Castle on 22 February. His remains were preserved in salt and conveyed to his ancestral tomb at the Abbey of St. Evroult.
  - His sons Robert and Ivo inherited his lands and titles, Robert the lands in Normandy and Ivo the titles in Leicester and Leicestershire.

== 12th century ==
The Cinquefoil of the House of Beaumont, the emblem of the first Earls and the modern city

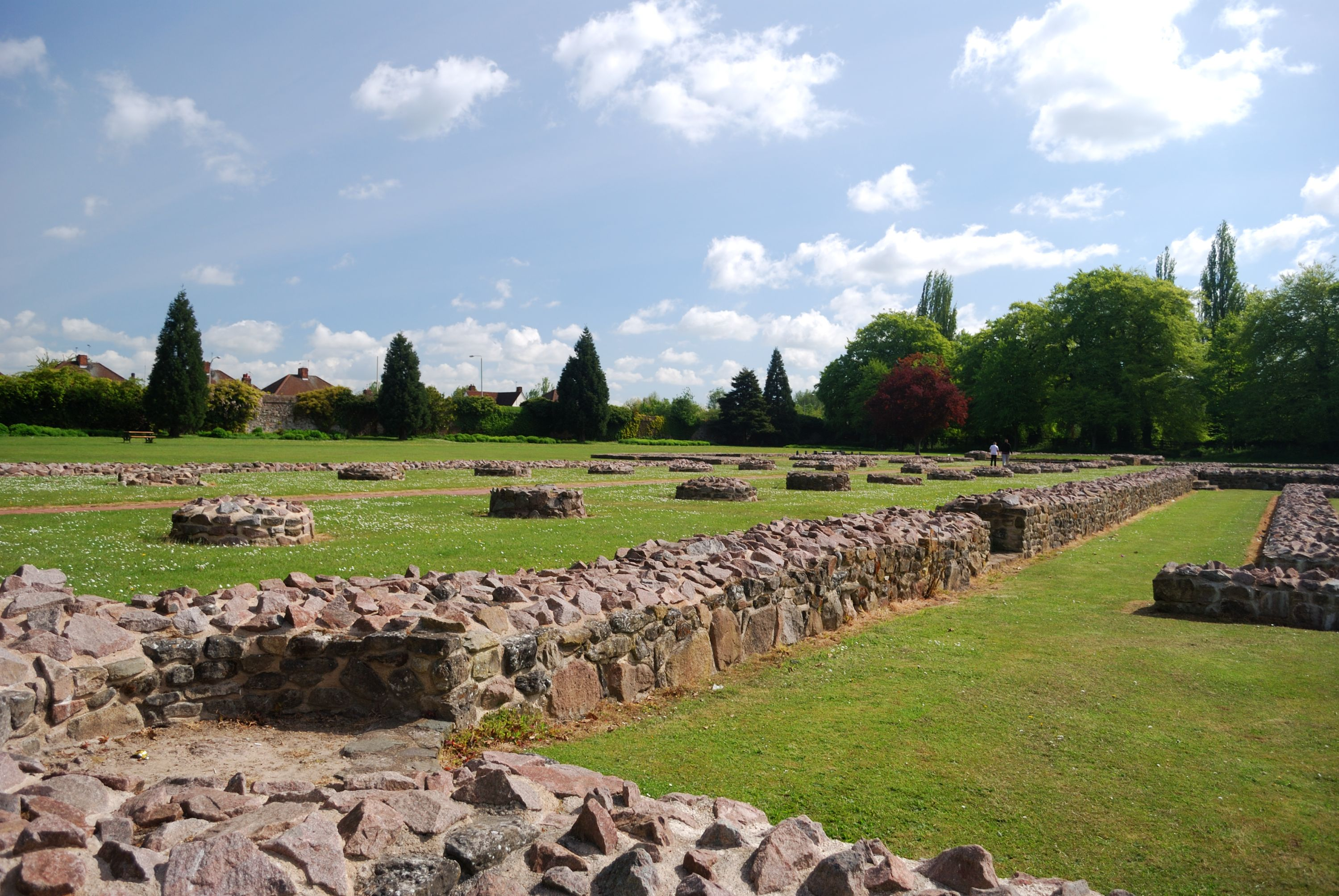
Leicester Abbey established by Robert le Bossu, the second of the Beaumont Earls

- 1100-1102 — Ivo de Grandmesnil, who according to Orderic Vitalis was the "first to introduce the horrors of private war into (post-conquest) England", and a number of other barons rebel against Henry I in favour of Robert Curthose.
  - c. 1101 - Ivo leads an attack on the properties of the king and other nobles in the town of Leicester and receives a heavy fine.
  - 1102 - Ivo de Grandmesnil leases his Leicester territory and titles to Robert de Beaumont, Count of Meulan and counsellor of King Henry, for a period of 15 years in return for money to pay his fine and go on crusade to the Holy Lands. Ivo dies en route leaving the freehold of his estates to his children and their use in the hands of Robert de Beaumont.
- 1107 — Robert de Beaumont formally made Earl of Leicester, the first of that title. His possession of the castle and the old Roman town was confirmed by King Henry I against the Grantmesnil interest.
  - College of Priests established to serve St Mary de Castro and the castle's residents by the 1st Earl. All town parishes were placed under its control apart from St Margaret's.
  - Beaumont confirmed the rights and privileges of the Portmanmoot and its Burgesses.
- 1118 — Robert le Bossu, younger son of Robert de Beaumont, inherits the Earldom of Leicester. The County of Meulan and the other titles of Beaumont detach from the Earldom of Leicester at this point.
- 1143 – Leicester Abbey was founded by Robert le Bossu for the canons previously resident at St Mary de Castro. All town parishes pass to its control including the college at St Mary de Castro while the Bishop of Lincoln continued to retain St Margaret's alone.
- 1168 — Robert le Bossu is buried at Leicester Abbey following his death in Northamptonshire.
- 1173 – Robert Blanchemains, 3rd Earl of Leicester became a principal rebel in the Revolt of 1173–1174 against Henry II.
  - Leicester was besieged beginning in April by the royal army, at least 410 archers and more than 300 knights. Records survive of over 100 carpenters paid to construct siege machines. On 28 July the town was stormed from two directions, a break in the walls on Church Gate and another one near St Clement's Church and the River Soar. The houses were burned, the old Romano-Saxon and Norman walls demolished, and the burghers exiled to wander as outlaws. The castle alone held out. The town took many centuries to recover and large sections of the districts worst effected were still orchards and vegetable gardens until the 18th century.
- 1174 - second round of attacks on Leicester, this time to take the castle. Keep destroyed.

== 13th century ==
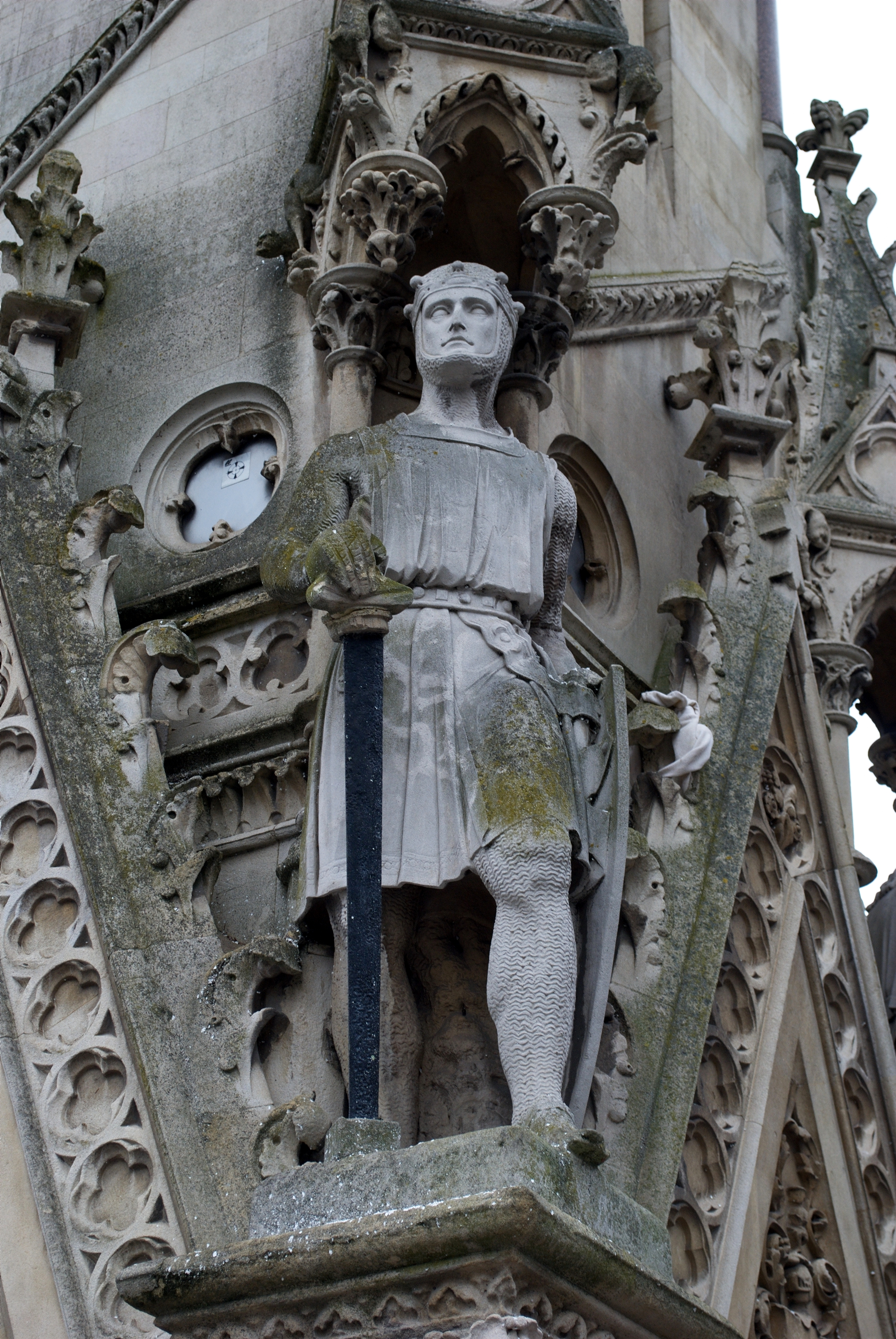
Statue of Simon de Montfort, 6th Earl of Leicester on the Haymarket Memorial Clock Tower

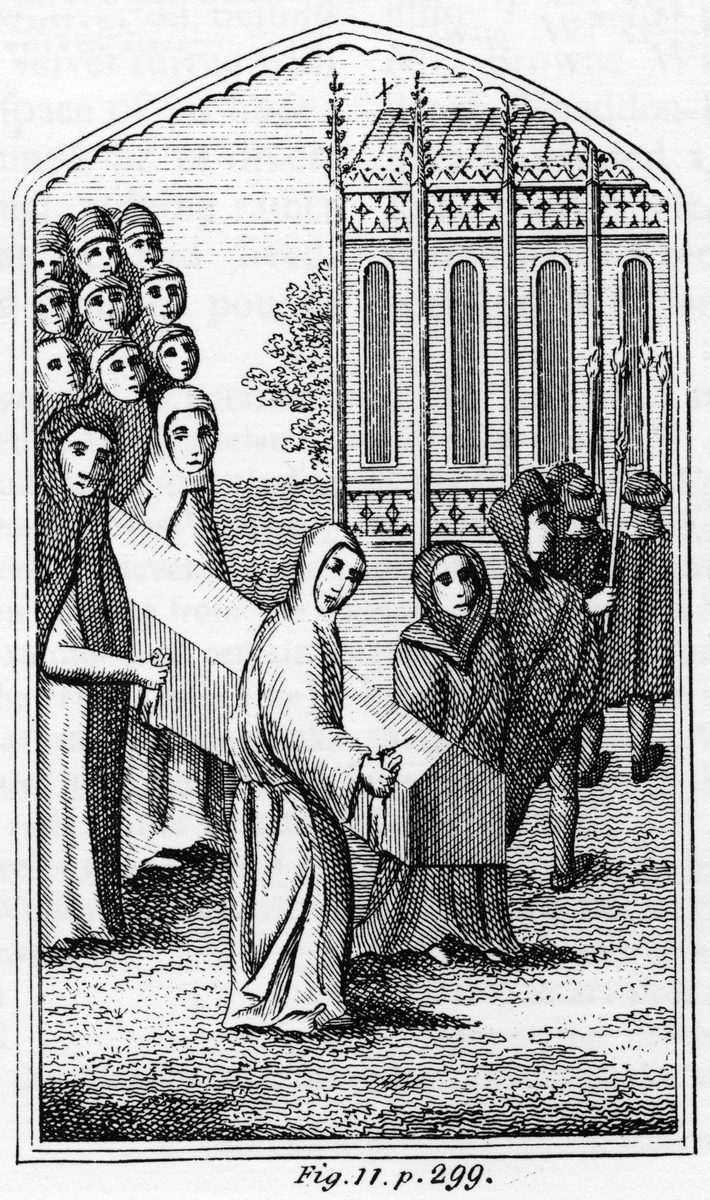
An image of a medieval funeral procession in Leicester involving Friars from the four great mendicant orders the Leicester Greyfriars, as well as the Leicester Blackfriars, the Leicester Austin Friars, the Whitefriars (not actually present in Leicester), and a group of lay mourners. The church depicted is the now demolished St Sepulchre outside the southern wall of old Leicester (now Leicester Royal Infirmary).

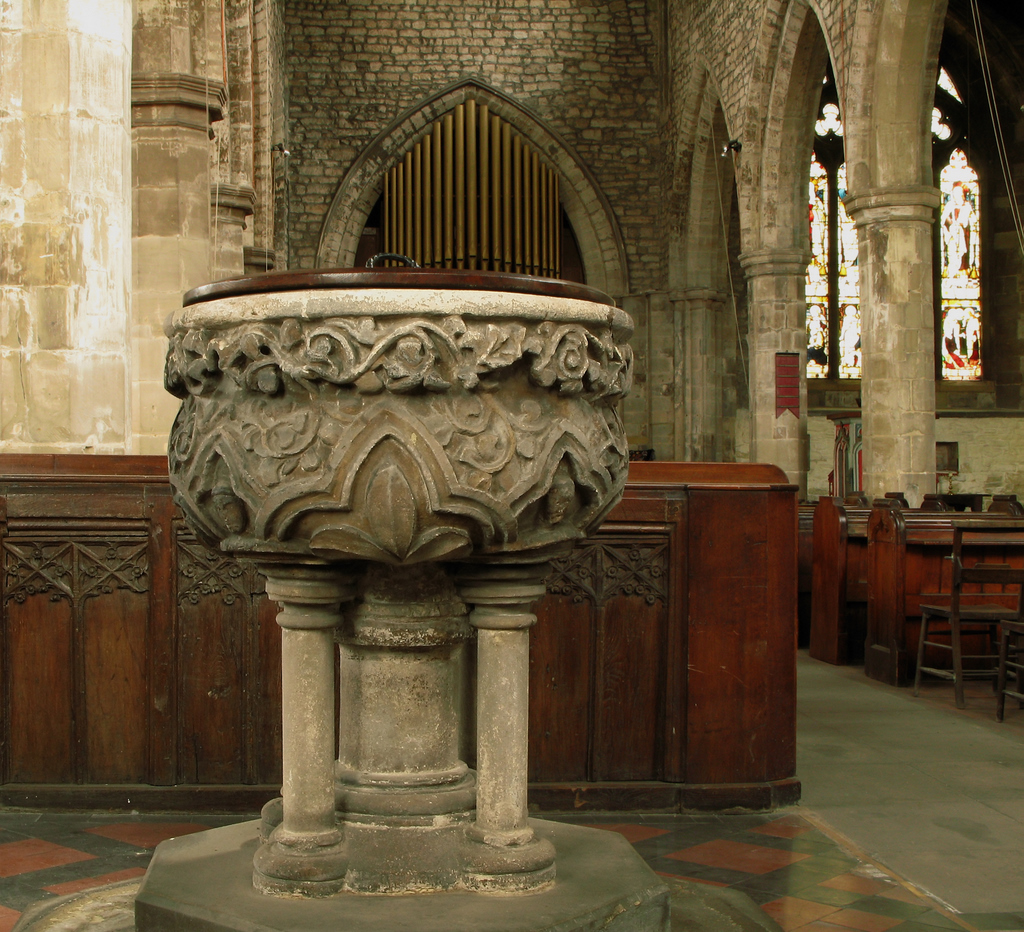
The sumptuously carved 13th cent font in All Saints.

- 1204 — Simon de Montfort, a French nobleman engaged in the Albigensian Crusade, was granted the Earldom of Leicester vacant since 1190. The 5th Earl never visited the borough and collected its rents through a Reeve.
- 1209 — First term of the mayoralty of William fitz Leveric, the first recorded Mayor of Leicester.
- 1228 – Leicester fair active.
- 1229 — Robert Grosseteste appointed Archdeacon of Leicester (famous scholastic philosopher and theologian, later Bishop of Lincoln).
- c. 1230 – The Order of Friars Minor (Franciscans or Greyfriars) established St Mary Magdalene's Friary (Leicester Greyfriars) just inside the towns southern wall east of Southgates, between what became Southgates, Friar Lane, Grey Friars, and St Martins. They were the first of mendicant orders to establish themselves in the town.
- 1231 — Expulsion of the Jews of Leicester. The 6th Earl of Leicester Simon de Montfort expelled the Jewish community to beyond the town walls, the first of such official pogroms preceding the national Edict of Expulsion in 1290.
- c. 1247 – The Order of Friars Preachers (Dominicans or Blackfriars) established St Clement's Priory (Leicester Blackfriars) in the north west corner of the old town walls taking St Clement's parish church as their priory church. The site was between Soar Lane and Great Central Street and was commemorated after the reformation in names such as St Sundays Bridge (St Sunday being an English nickname for St Dominic), Friars Preachers Lane which was the name of Great Central Street, Friars Causeway, Friars Mill, and the district of the city known as Blackfriars.
- c. 1254 — The Order of Friars Hermits of St Augustine (Austinfriars) established St Katherine's Priory (Leicester Austinfriars) north west of West Bridge on Bede Island. The site is now on the right hand side of St Augustine's Road.
- 1265 — Edmund Crouchback granted the earldom, castle, and city of Leicester on 26 October after the death of Simon de Montfort at the Battle of Evesham earlier that year.
- 1267 – Earldoms of Leicester and Lancaster united into one when Crouchback was made Earl of Lancaster.
- 1269 – Leicester assessed as 13th richest borough in the Kingdom of England.
- 1294 — Ralph Norman and Robert de Scarnford are elected by the burghers of Leicester as their representatives to the Parliament of England. This is the first record of the Leicester Constituency which survived as a seat with two members in the English and subsequent Great British and UK Parliaments until 1918.
- 1298 — Leicester Market first recorded as taking place regularly at its present site.

== 14th century ==
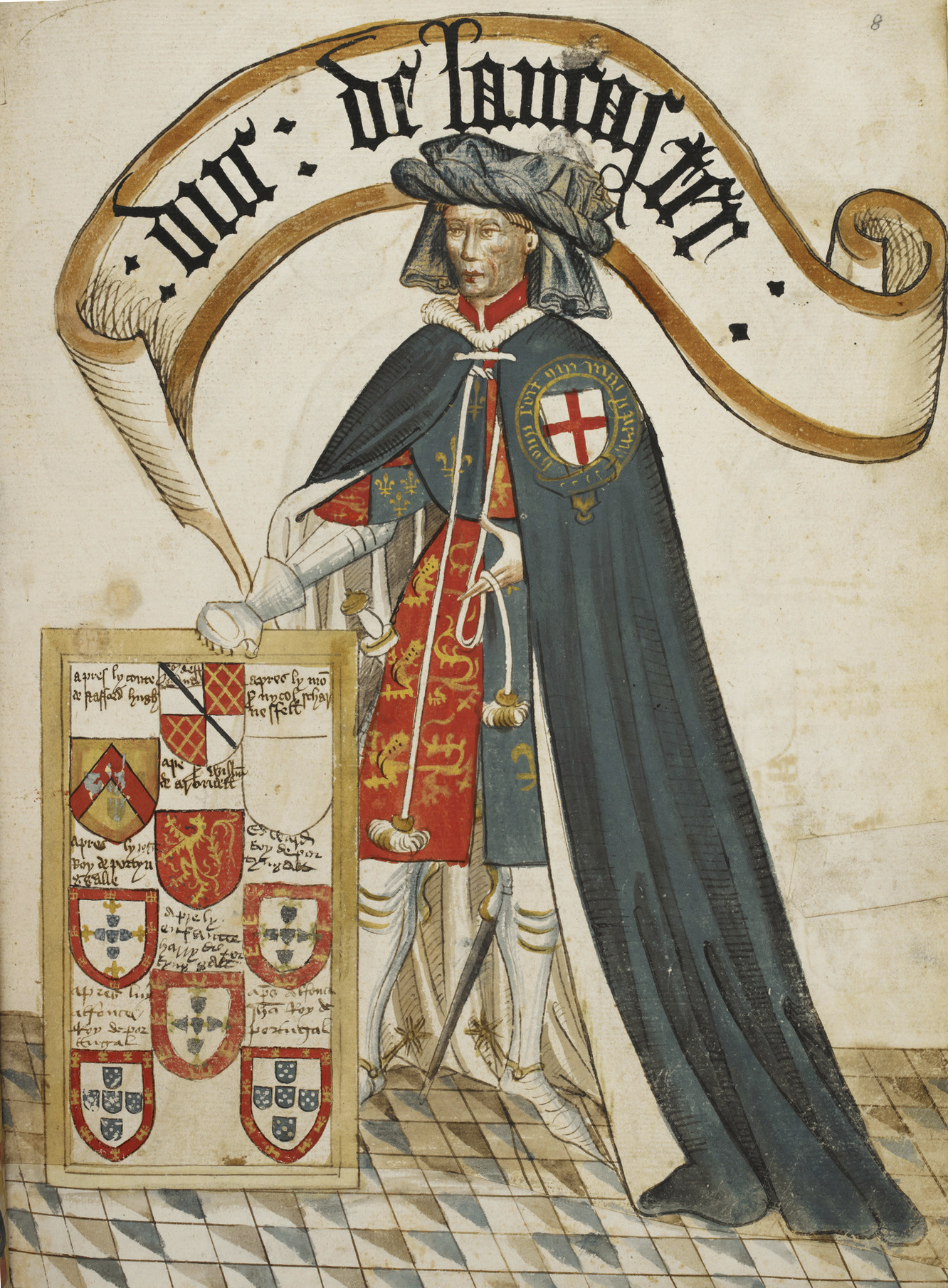
Henry of Grosmont who died at Leicester Castle on 23 March 1361

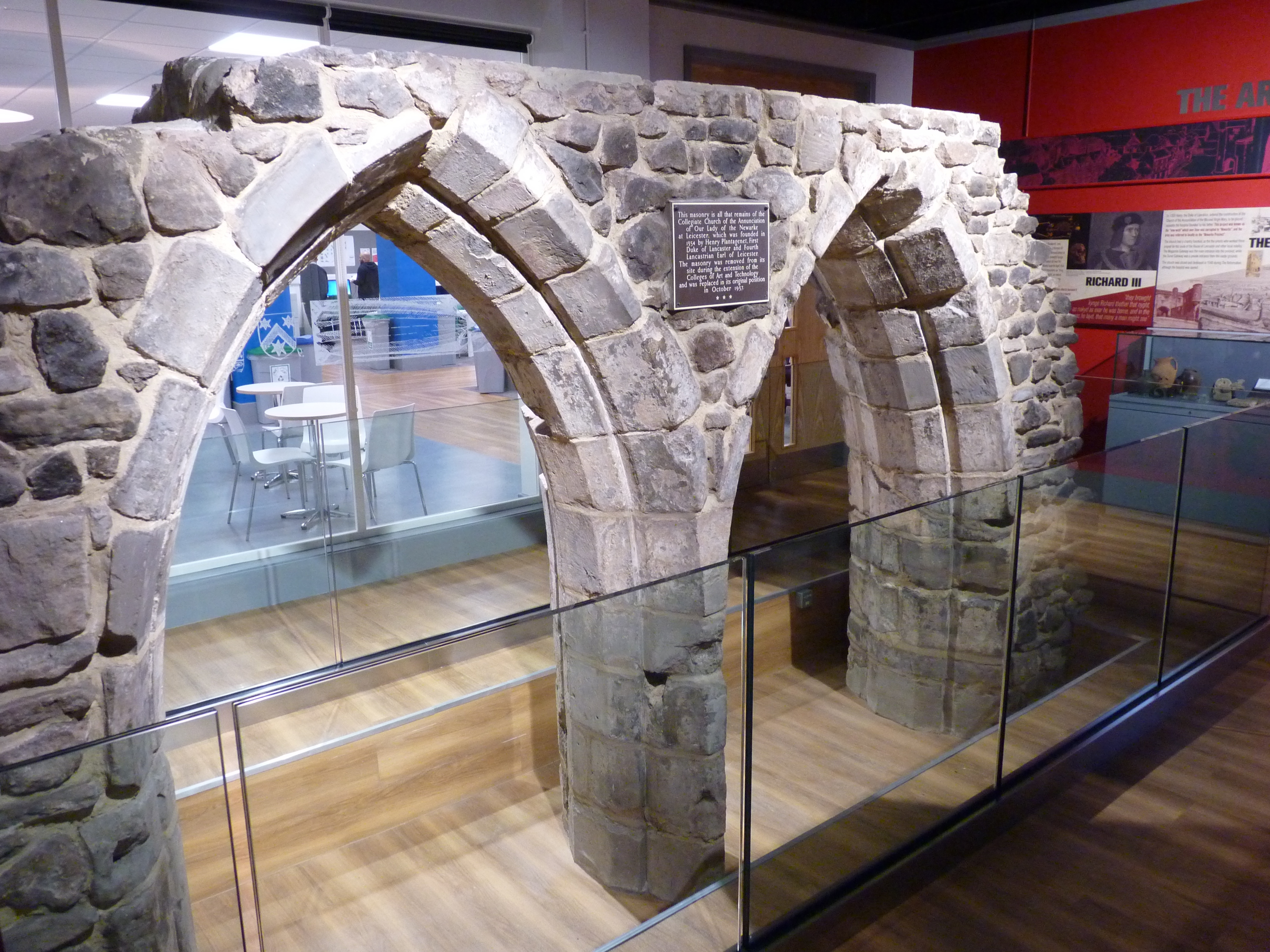
Ruins of the Chapel of Our Lady of the Newark, the spiritual hub of the Newarke, a chantry and hospital complex established by Henry Grosmont in 1353

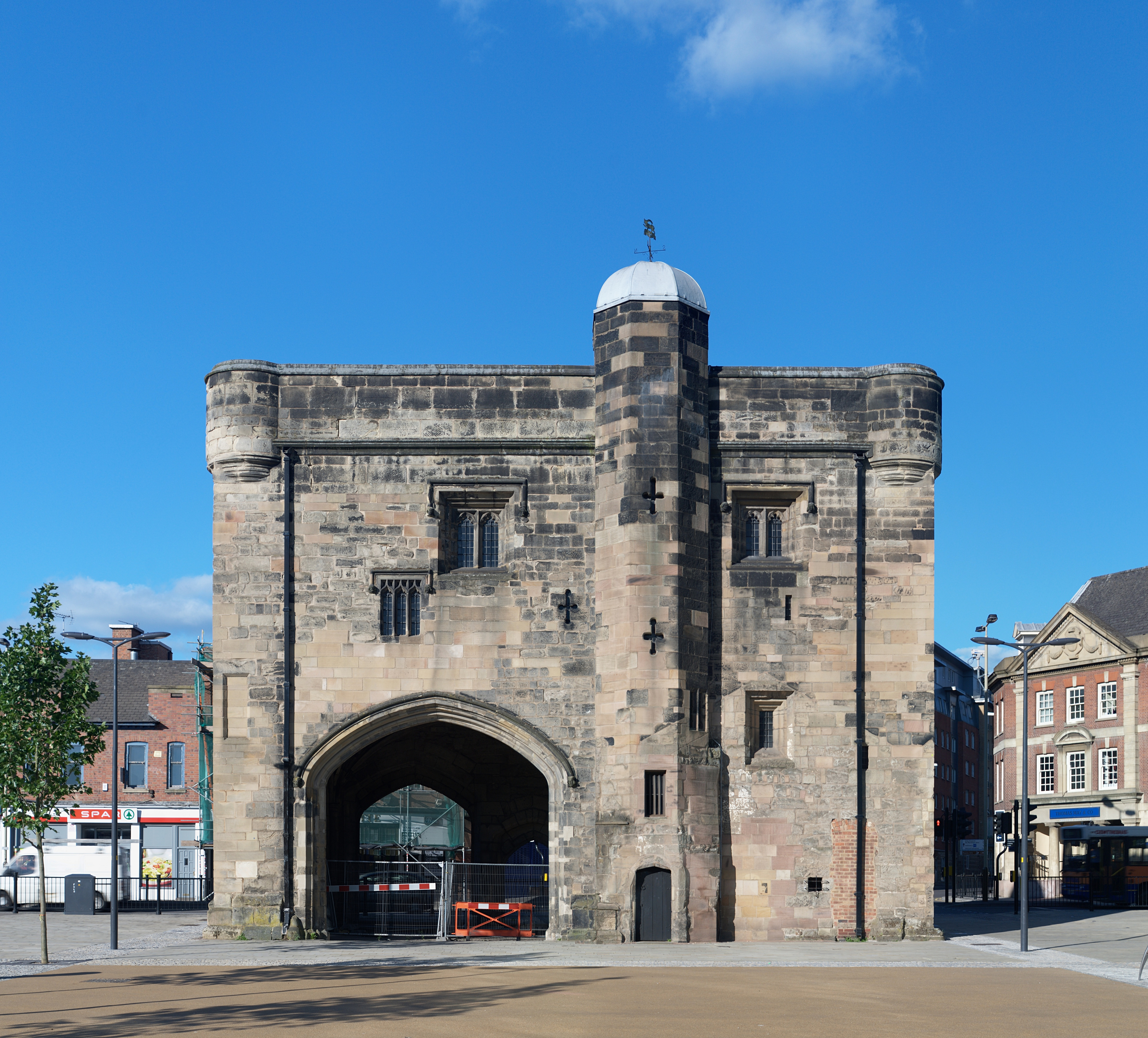
Magazine Gateway, part of the Newarke complex established by Henry Grosmont, constructed c. 1400

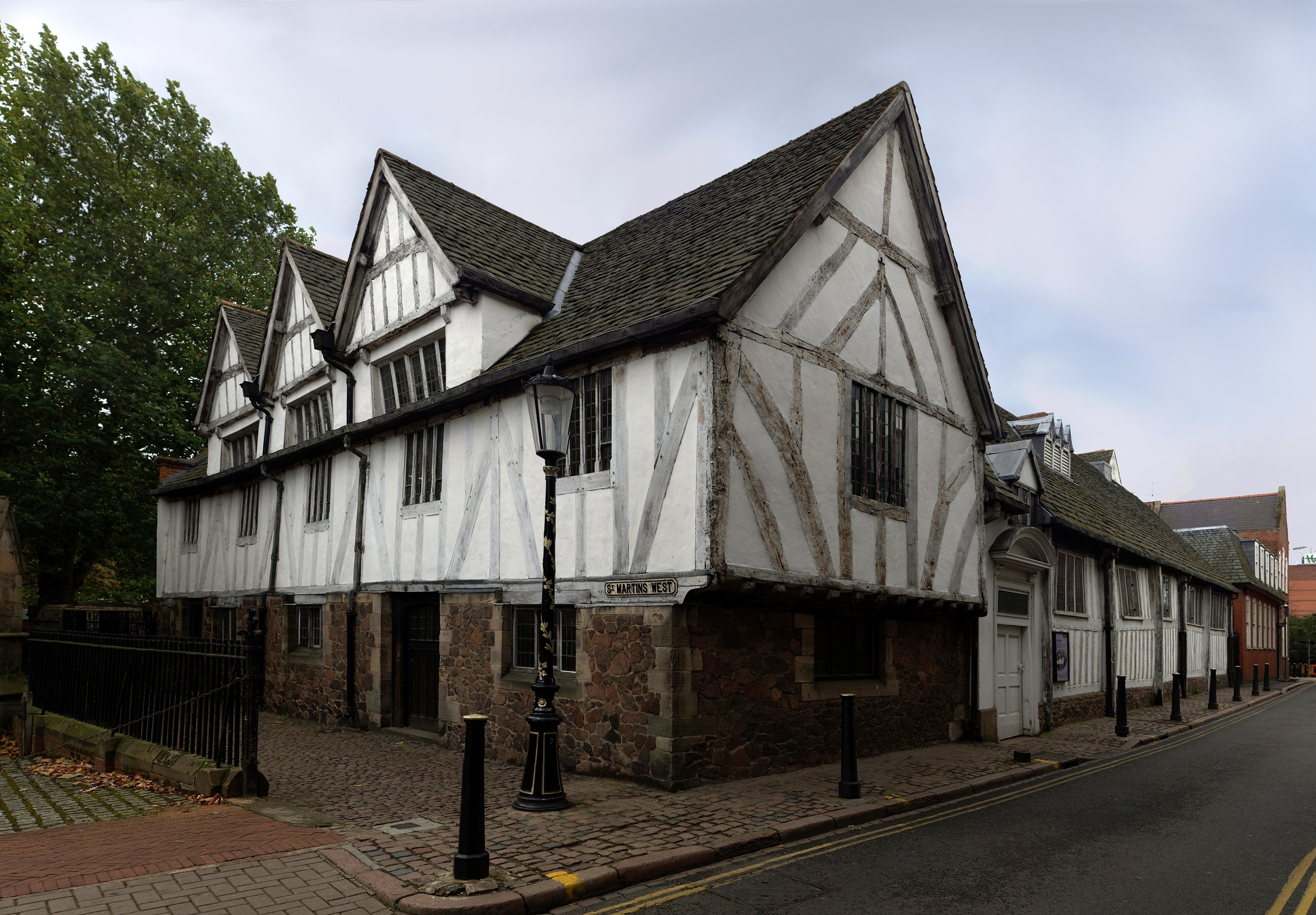
Leicester Guildhall constructed by the Corpus Christi Guild of St Martin's parish c. 1390

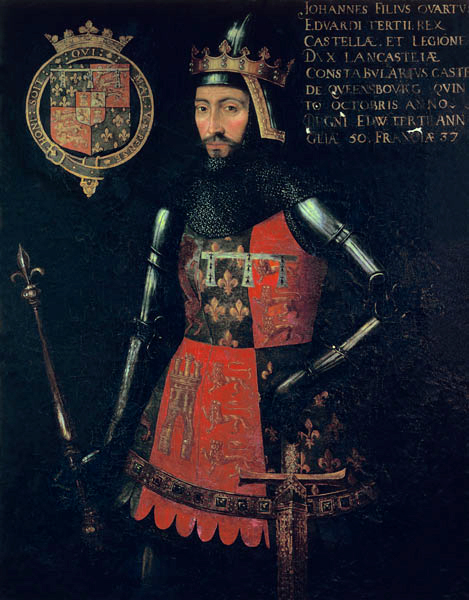
John of Gaunt, Duke of Lancaster and Earl of Leicester, the preeminent supporter of John Wycliffe and the early Lollards who died at Leicester Castle on 3 February 1399

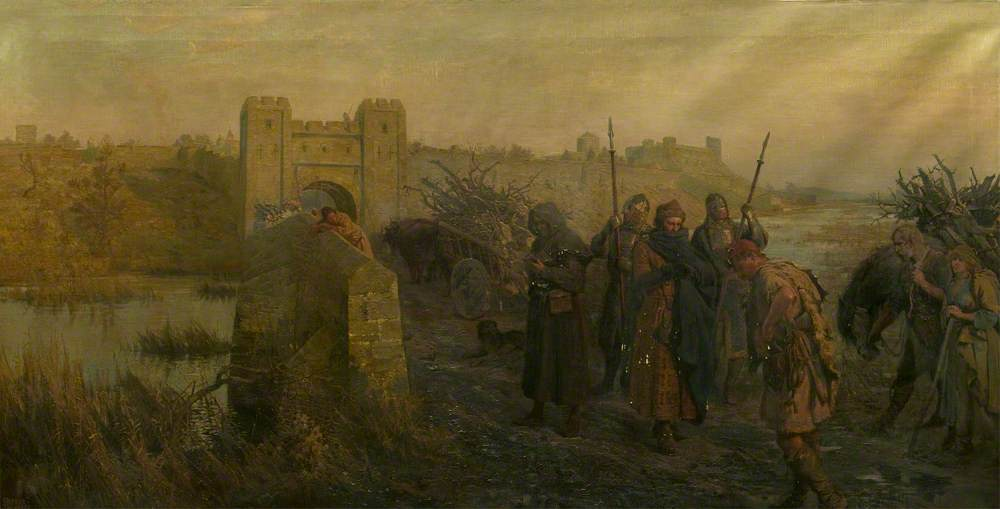
The Old Woodgate, Leicester by Henry Reynolds Steer

- 1300 – King Edward I stayed at Leicester Castle.
- 1307 – King Edward II granted a fair for 17 days after Trinity Sunday.
- 1310 – King Edward II stayed at the castle and again in 1311.
- 1318 – The Parliament of England met at Leicester for the first time on 12 April. The 18th Parliament of the reign of Edward II, it was a "parliament" in a technical sense because the king was not present. The Archbishop of Canterbury, five Bishops, three Earls, and 28 barons attended. No representatives of the Commons were present.
- 1330 – Trinity Hospital was founded south of the castle walls.
- 1350 - Leicester's Guild of Corpus Christi constituted.
- 1353 – The Newarke enclosure is constructed around Trinity Hospital and a college of priests is established to serve the new Church of the Annunciation of Our Lady. The foundation is established and endowed by Henry of Grosmont, 1st Duke of Lancaster.
- 1360 – Philippa of Lancaster born at Leicester Castle, daughter of John of Gaunt and Blanche of Lancaster, later Queen of Portugal, the spouse of King João I founder of the House of Aviz.
- 1361 — Henry of Grosmont died at Leicester Castle. Buried in the Newarke Chantry.
- 1366 — Geoffrey Chaucer and Philippa Roet married, according to popular local tradition, at St Mary de Castro.
- 1377 – Leicester assessed as 17th richest borough in the Kingdom of England.
- 1382 — First notable Lollard activity in the city.
  - An informal devotional society had developed at St John's Chapel on Belgrave Gate in St Margaret's Parish around William Smith and Richard Waytestathe.
  - A local hermit called William Swinderby living in Leicester Forest had begun preaching against the mendicant orders and church property possibly with the encouragement of Philip Repyngdon, then a young canon of Leicester Abbey, who had come into contact with the ideas of John Wycliffe while studying in Oxford.
  - On Palm Sunday 1382 (falling on 23 March) William Swinderby preached a notable sermon in the presence of John Stafford, the Mayor of Leicester, and many burghers. It spread Lollardy so effectively among the people of the borough that Leicester chronicler Henry Knighton remarked every second man had become a Lollard.
- 1389
  - On 11 July William Swinderby was tried under John Bokyngham, Bishop of Lincoln after an accusation from three mendicants; Friar Frisby, a Franciscan from Greyfriars, Friar Hincely, an Augustinian from St Katherine's Priory, and Thomas Blaxton, a Dominican from St Clement's Priory. He recanted and was sentenced to an extensive public penance requiring he preach sermons proclaiming his recantation in St Margaret's, St Martin's and St Mary de Castro as well as at St Dionysius, Market Harborough and St Mary's Melton Mowbray.
  - The Archbishop of Canterbury William Courtenay undertook an inquisition in the Borough of Leicester conducted at Leicester Abbey in October and November 1389.
    - The burghers Roger Dexter, Nicholas Taylor, Richard Wagstaff, Michael Scrivener, William Smith, John Henry, William Parchmeanar, and Roger Goldsmith also summonsed for inquisition but failed to appear. This led to a solemn ceremony of excommunication taking place on All Souls Day (Nov 2nd 1389) headed by the Archbishop of Canterbury at the Abbey and repeated by the clergy in all the towns parish churches. All parishioners of the town were placed under interdict, i.e. prevented from participating in the sacraments such that masses were prohibited in Leicester's churches, until the culprits were produced.
    - Following the interdict, Matilda, anchoress immured at St Peter's church, had her enclosure violated to answer the charge of heresy. She was required to undertake forty days of penance before returning to her cell.
    - By 17 November the accused heretics had all been discovered and recanted. Roger Dexter's wife Alice protested and maintained her earlier conviction. As a result, she and her husband were required to undertake a humiliating but mild series of public penances, carrying crosses, kissing the earth and reciting prayers.
- 1390 – Corpus Christi Guildhall constructed (approx. date).
- 1394 — Constance of Castile, Duchess of Lancaster, daughter of Peter King of Castile and second wife of John of Gaunt, died at the castle on 24 March.
- 1399
  - John of Gaunt died at Leicester Castle on 3 February in the presence of his long term mistress and 3rd wife Katherine Swynford.
  - Henry Bolingbroke, Gaunt's son, overthrew Richard II and became King Henry IV on 30 September. The properties of the Duchy of Lancaster, including Leicester Castle and its estates, were assumed into the properties of the English Crown.
  - St Mary de Castro became one of the Chapels Royal. The parish retains some of these legal privileges and royal dignities today, such as the use of red cassocks.

== 15th century ==
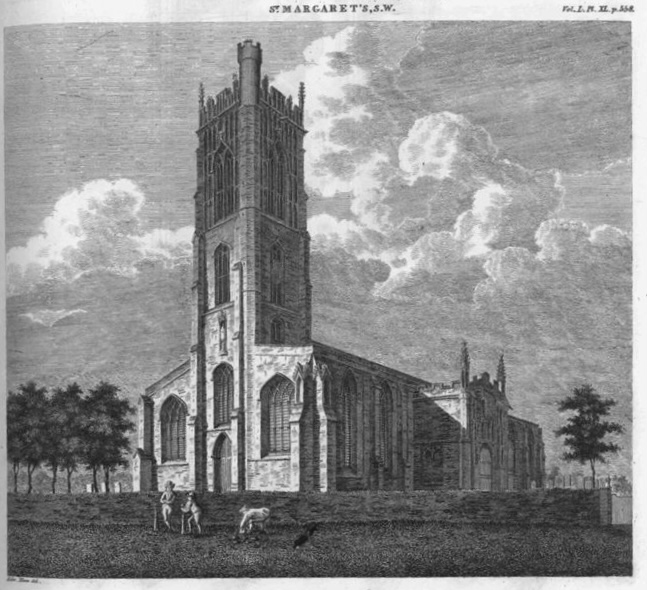
The splendid perpendicular tower of St Margaret's constructed c. 1444 and paid for by the “smoke farthing” tax, a tax on chimneys within the parish

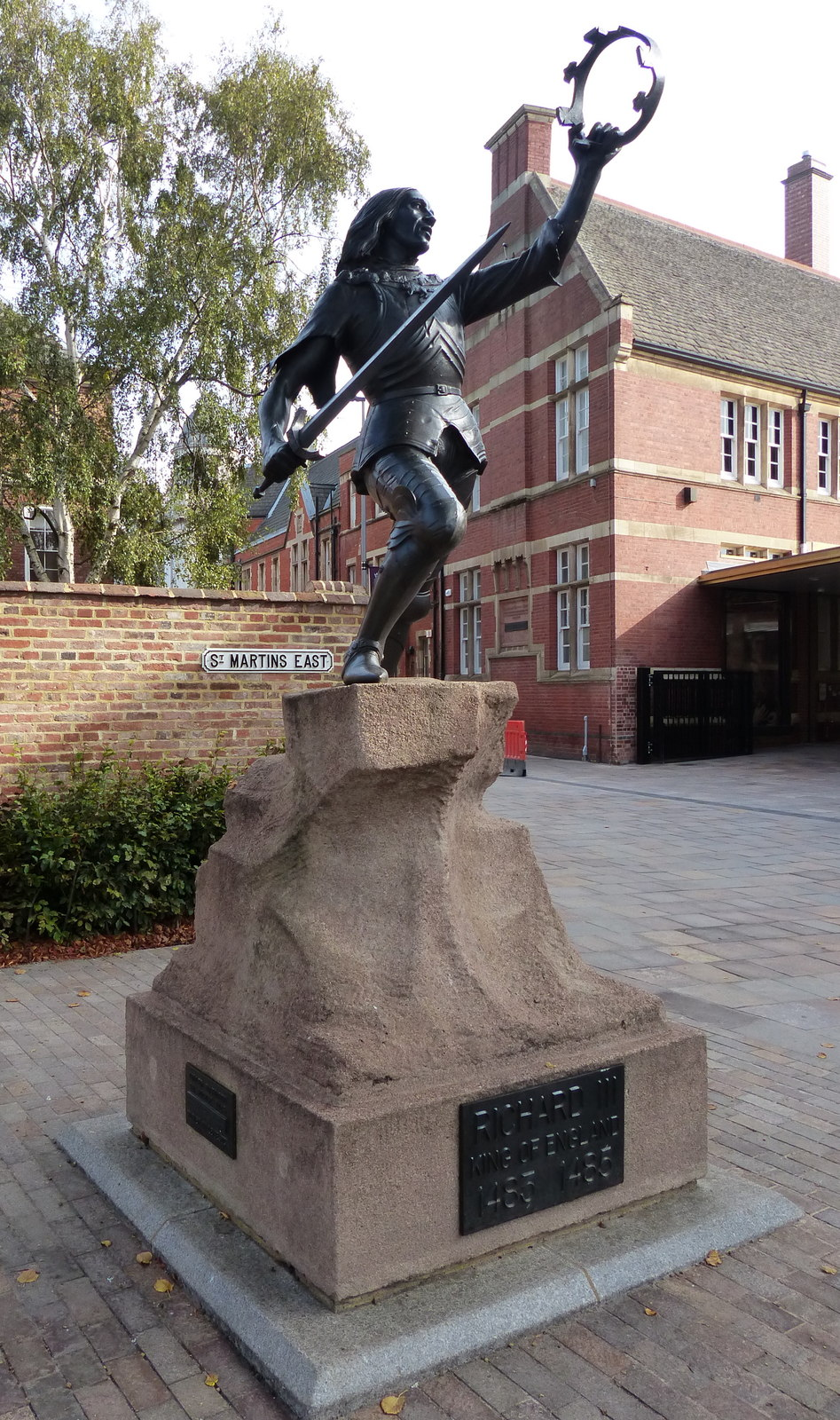
Statue of Richard III in Leicester. He spent 19 and 20 August 1485 in Leicester, before riding to the Battle of Bosworth Field and his death on 22 August

- 1405 – Philip Repyngdon, repentant Lollard and Abbot of Leicester, made Bishop of Lincoln.
- 1414
  - In early January a militia of Leicester Lollards went to join the Oldcastle Revolt. On defeat of the rebellion all of them were executed by being hanged by the neck and suspended in fire on 10 January 1414.
  - Parliament of England met at Leicester for the Second Parliament of the reign of Henry V. Known as the Fire and Faggot Parliament it met in Greyfriars Friary between 30 April and 29 May and is most notable for passing the Suppression of Heresy Act 1414.
- 1416 - commissions to investigate Lollardy were active in Leicester and the county for a second time.
- 1419 – Margery Kempe (pilgrim, travel writer, and first English autobiographer) made a pilgrimage to the Newarke and Leicester Abbey, was accused of Lollardy by the Mayor of Leicester (most likely William Pacy, possibly Thomas Walgrave), tried in All Saints Church, and acquitted by the Abbot of Leicester Richard Rothley.
- 1425–1427 – The English royal court was in residence at Leicester Castle:
  - The child King Henry VI stayed at the castle during which time he was knighted and underwent his coming of age ceremonies. He took his bath and vigil the night before in St Mary de Castro.
- 1426 – The Parliament of Bats was held in the Great Hall of the castle.
- c. 1444 – Most of St Margaret's Church was rebuilt, including the West Tower.
- 1450 – Parliament of England met at Leicester, 18th Parliament of the reign of Henry VI. Was adjourned because of Jack Cade's Rebellion.
- 1485 – Richard III spent the night before he died in Leicester and was buried in the Greyfriars Church following his death:
  - stayed in Leicester for his last two nights, 19-20 August, before riding to the Battle of Bosworth Field on the 21st. He stayed at the Blue Boar Inn on what is today Highcross Street.
  - Richard's body was afterwards brought back to Leicester through the West Gates and buried by the Franciscans in their Church on 25 August.
- c. 1485 - Hugh Aston, musician, composer, Mayor, and MP, is born in the city around the year 1485.

== 16th century ==
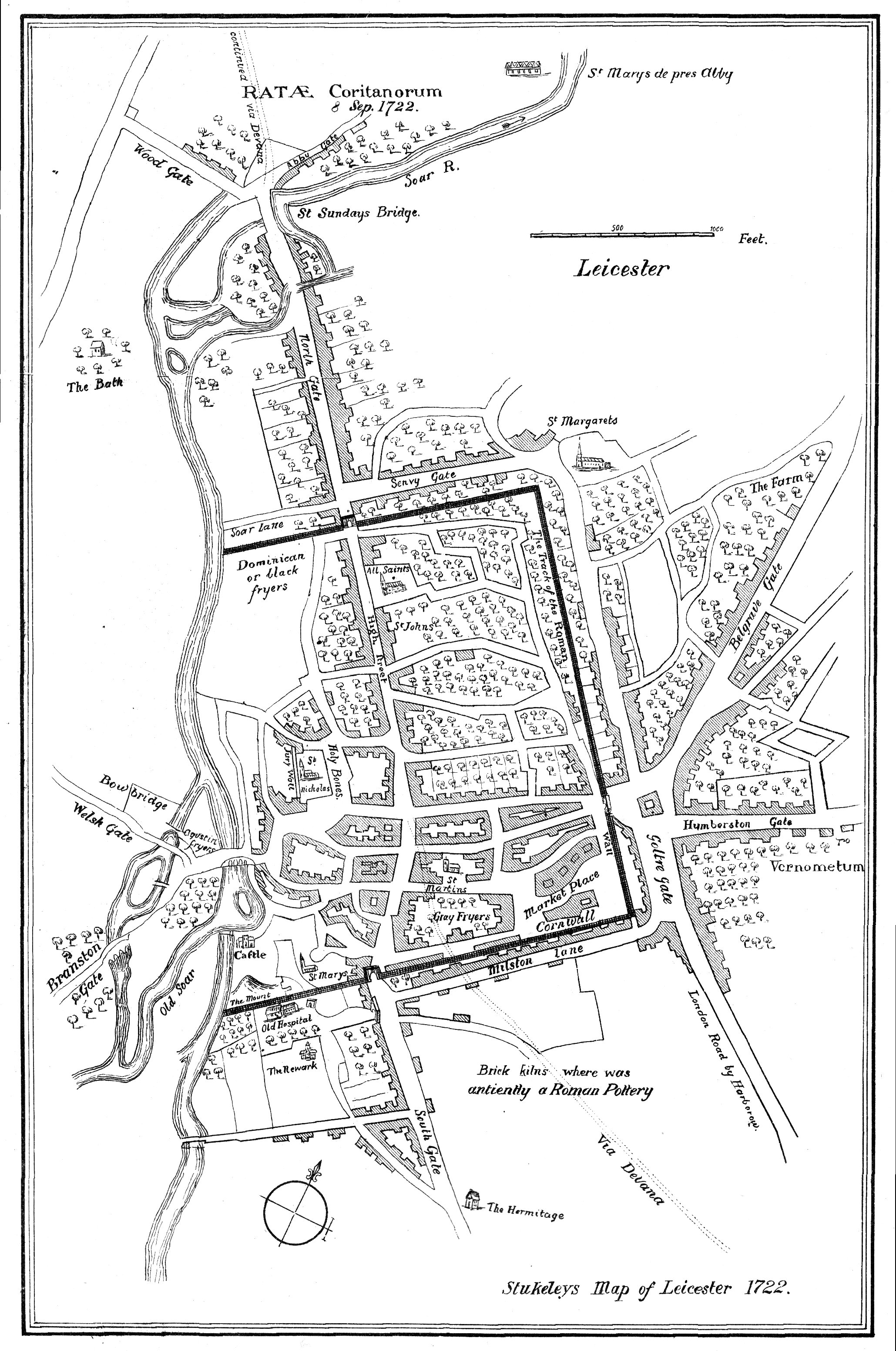
The Borough of Leicester at the end of the Middle Ages with its town wall clearly marked

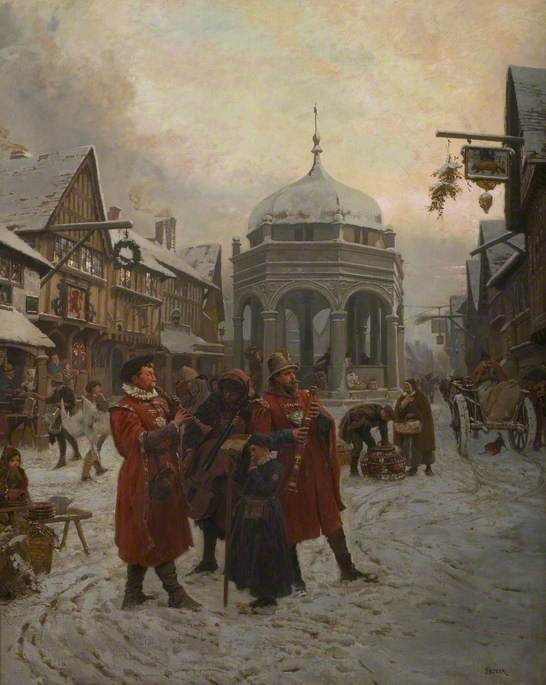
Christmas Eve, Highcross Market, Leicester by Henry Reynolds Steer

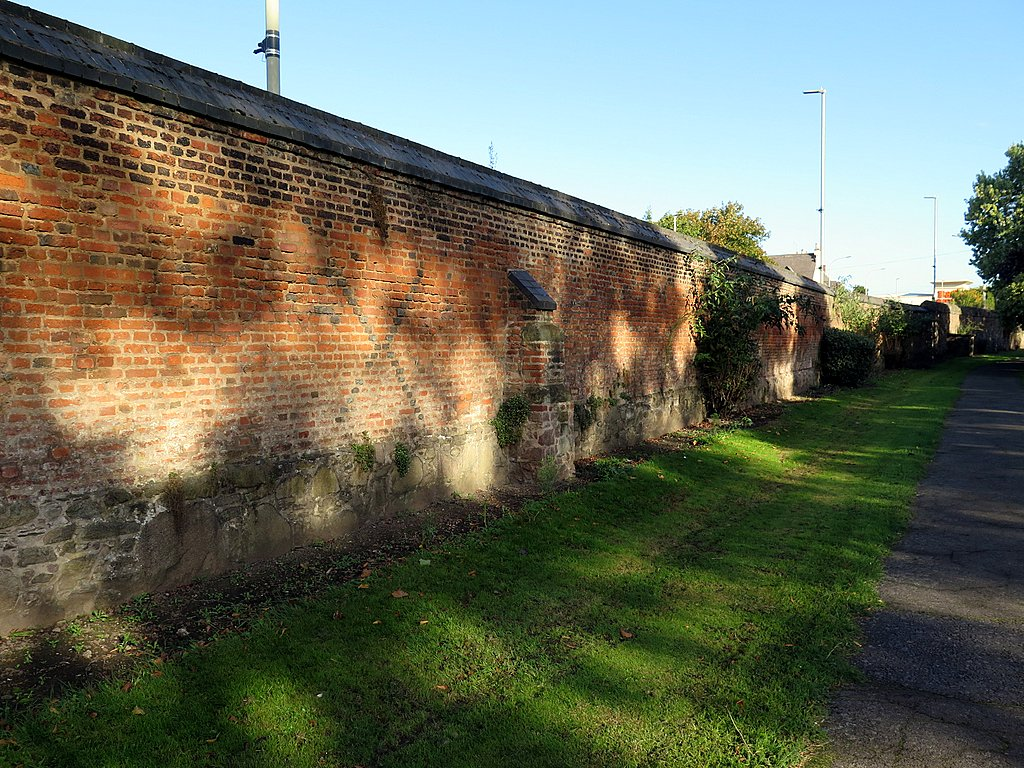
Leicester Abbey Eastern Wall constructed c. 1500

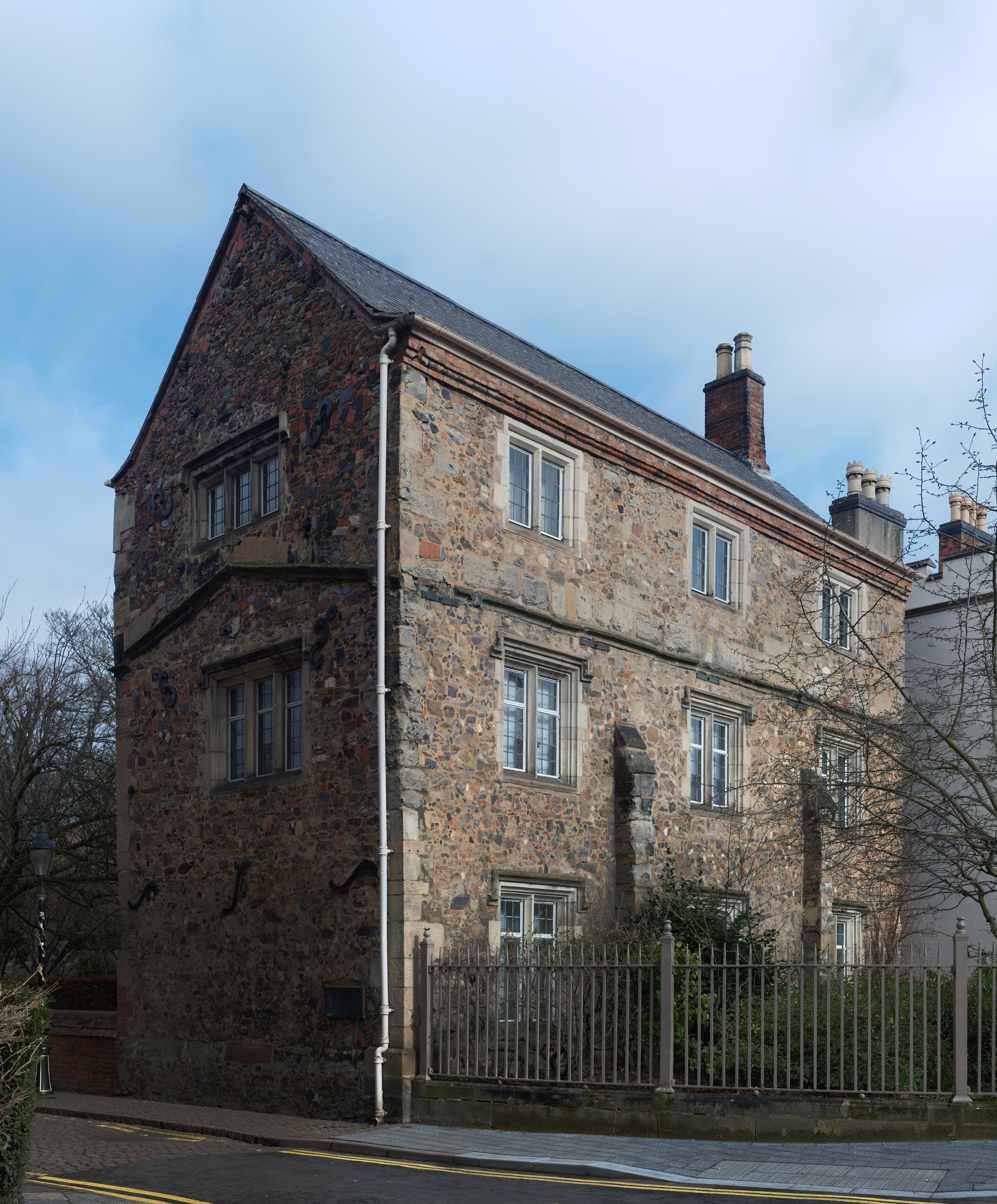
Wyggeston's Chantry House constructed c. 1511

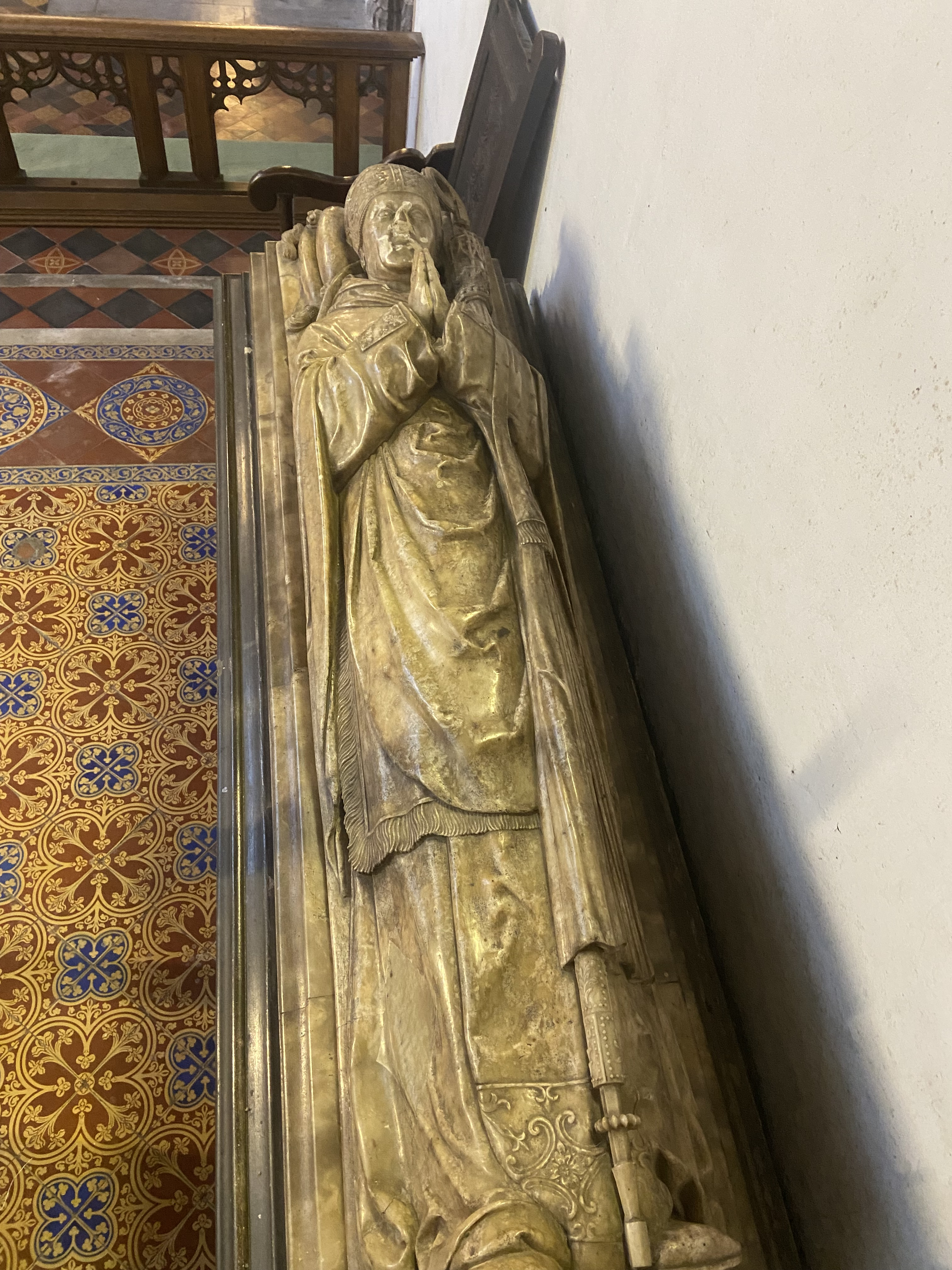
Tomb effigy of Bishop John Penny in the chancel of St Margaret's. Carved from alabaster c. 1520

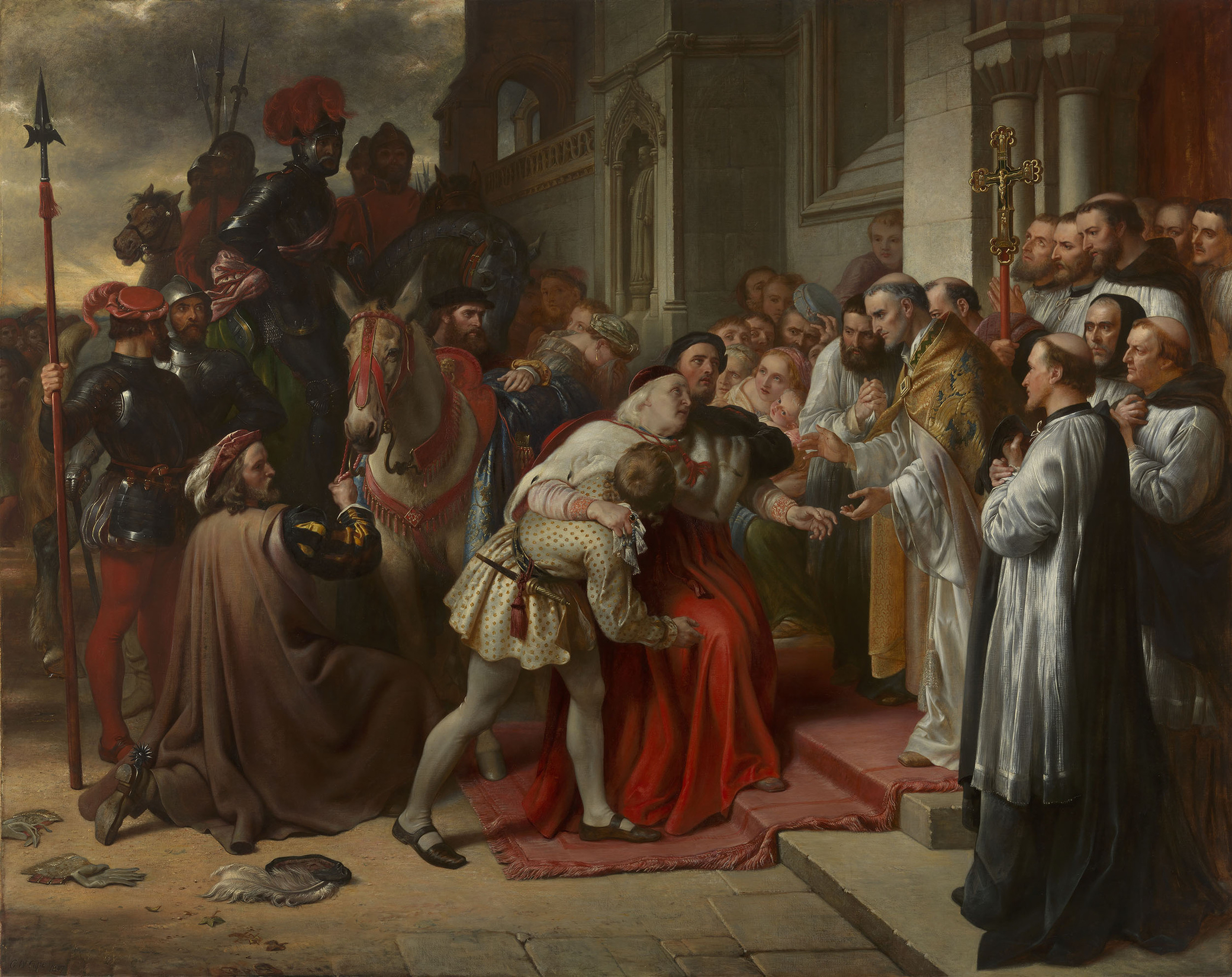
Cardinal Wolsey at the Gate of Leicester Abbey by Charles West Cope. A depiction of Wolsey's arrival at Leicester Abbey in late 1529 suffering from dysentery and forsaken by his former supporter, Henry VIII

- c. 1500 - Leicester Abbey Eastern Wall constructed.
- 1504 - John Penny, Abbot of Leicester made Bishop of Bangor.
- c. 1511
  - Henry VIII visits the town as part of a royal progress.
  - Wigston's Chantry House was built in the Newarke.
- 1513 – Wyggeston Hospital founded.
- 1520 - Bishop John Penny buried in St Margaret's Church, Leicester.
- 1530 – Cardinal Thomas Wolsey died at Leicester Abbey on 29 November.
- 1534 – The Henrician Reformation begins and the parish churches of the city, county, and wider Diocese of Lincoln formally ceased to be Roman Catholic due the First Act of Supremacy and the secession of the Church of England from Papal authority.
- 1536 – John Leland visited Leicester and recorded its ancient monuments and churches in his Itinerary.
- 1538 – All monastic houses in the city are suddenly closed in October and November as part of the Dissolution of the Monasteries. The three mendicant houses all surrendered on the same day, 10 November:
  - Leicester Abbey,
  - the Greyfriars,
  - the Austin Friars,
  - & the Blackfriars.
- 1547-1549 — The various effects of the Edwardian Reformation are felt in the borough following the death of Henry VIII and the succession of his young son Edward VI:
  - 1548 - Churchwarden accounts at St Martins record the destruction or sale of most vestments, tabernacles, iconography, the rood loft statues and other traditional adornments on 20 March due to the Sacrament Act passed December the previous year.
  - 1548 - The Guild of Corpus Christi and all other parish Guilds were dissolved.
  - 1549 - The Book of Common Prayer was imposed on the parishes of the borough by the Act of Uniformity in place of the old Latin Use of Sarum. Accounts record its purchase.
  - Records for nails and chains to secure the new English Bible to lecterns are to be found in church accounts of 1549.
- 1550 – The Free Grammar School was established by this year using money left by William Wyggeston (ancestor of Wyggeston Grammar School for Boys and the current Wyggeston and Queen Elizabeth I College).
- 1553-5 - The borough's churches are subject to the various effects of the Marian Restoration of Roman Catholicism:
  - 1553 - First Statute of Repeal ended all of Edward's religious reforms and the borough's parishes reverted to the Sarum Rite and ancient custom.
  - 1554-1557 - St Martin's and St Margaret's parish rolls both record the gradual repurchase and restoration of ritual vestments and items at this time and payments for the repainting of roof screens and walls.
  - 1554 - See of Rome Act overturned Henry VIII's returning the parishes of Leicester to full communion with the Pope.
- 1556 - Thomas Moor (also spelled More) was burned for heresy at Leicester on 26 June.
- 1558 – The Second Act of Supremacy and the Act of Uniformity, the first parts of the Elizabethan Settlement, brought Leicester's parishes into schism with the Pope and returned them to state Protestantism.
  - The English Prayer Book and Bible were restored.
  - The restored ritual imagery and objects were again removed and sold.
- 1589 – Elizabeth I issues a Royal Charter establishing the Corporation of Leicester as a replacement for the Moot of Burgesses. It was granted the privilege of sharing the motto "Semper Eadem" with the monarch.
- 1595 – Skeffington House was built in the Newarke (approximate date).
- 1599, November – a recusant Roman Catholic, possibly a missionary priest, called Mr Barlow (perhaps one of the recusant Barlow family of Barlow Hall) was arrested by order of the mayor. On his person they found numerous catholic books, a pyx containing Communion wafers, and a bottle of holy water. When asked, he was prepared to swear an oath of allegiance to Elizabeth I as head of the Church of England, and was therefore released shortly after.

== 17th century ==
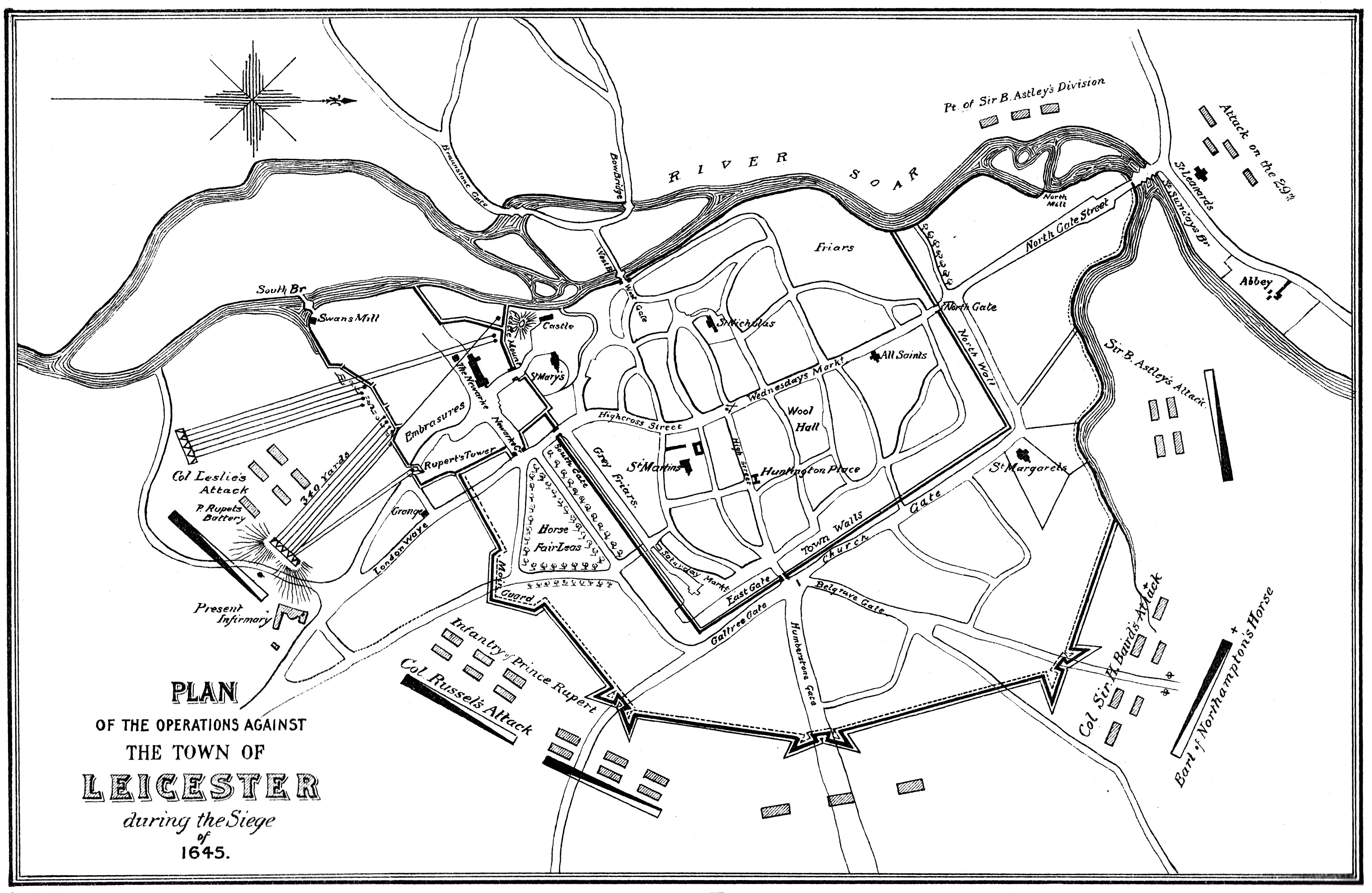
Map of the 1645 Siege of Leicester.

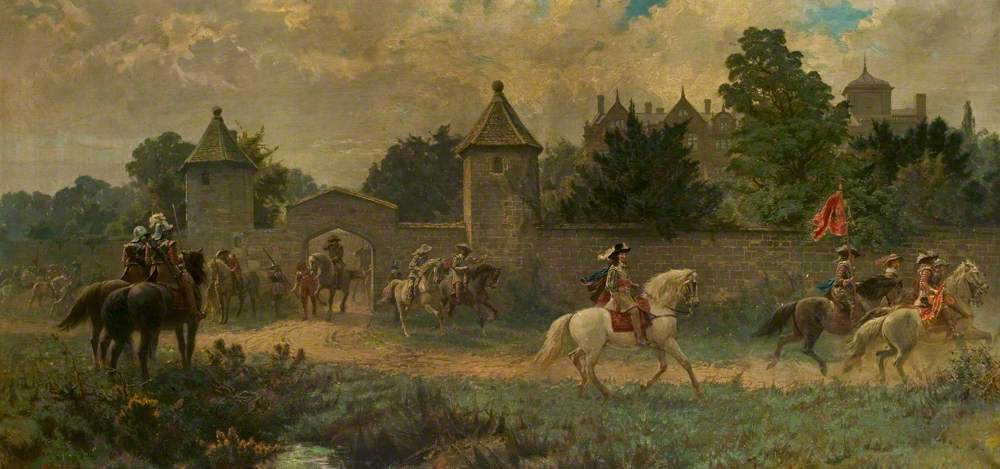
Charles I leaving Cavendish House by Henry Reynolds Steer. A depiction of Charles I's journey to relieve Oxford following his defeat of Leicester in May 1645

- 1603 – Anne of Denmark and her son Prince Henry stay in William Skipworth's house in Leicester on 23 June. Princess Elizabeth also stayed in the town, at the house of a Mr Pilkington.
- 1604 – Prince Charles and Alexander Seton lodged in Skipwith's house at Leicester on their way to London on 15 and 16 August.
- 1606 — Shakespeare's Company performed in Leicester Guildhall with William Shakespeare possibly among them.
- 1607 — Curfew imposed on the borough in May to prevent spread of the Midland Revolt, an anti enclosure rebellion beginning in Northamptonshire.
- 1616 — Leicester Boy Trials. Leicester Assizes conducted famous witch trial instigated by a 13-year-old boy who accused 15 women in Husbands Bosworth. Nine of the accused were hanged, one died in prison, and five were released on the order of King James I during his visit to the city that summer. The incident was the inspiration for Ben Jonson's play The Devil Is an Ass.
- 1627–1628 – The Leicester anti enclosure and disafforestation riots, a series of spring riots in both years in protest of Sir Miles Fleetwood's enclosure, division, and deforestation of Leicester Forest on the orders of King Charles I.
- 1642 – Charles I passed through Leicester before raising his standard at Nottingham.
- 1645 – The Siege of Leicester during the English Civil War.
- 1646 — the Newarke, in Royalist hands since the Siege, was stormed by Parliamentarian forces on 7 May. Festivities broke out among the burghers.
- 1647
  - Charles I spent the night of 13 February at the Angel Inn in Leicester on the journey to Holdenby following his capture by Parliament. In spite his status as a prisoner the Churchwarden of St Martins records the city paid for church bells to be rung to welcome him.
  - Directory for Public Worship adopted for use in the Church of England by the Puritan Rump Parliament. Most of Leicester's parishes adopted it with the exception of St Nicholas which continued to use the Royalist Common Prayer Book. The Diocese of Lincoln was also replaced with a Presbyterian structure.
- 1662 — Act of Uniformity returned the boroughs parishes to the revised rites of the pre Civil War Prayer Book. This led to the Great Ejection of Puritan clergy from parishes in Leicester and across the country which affected both St Martin's and St Margaret's.
- 1680
  - Knitting frames for hosiery were introduced about this time.
  - Leicester's Quakers constructed their first meeting house. It was built on the extra parochial land of the dissolved St Clement's Priory near Soar Lane and the Northgates end of Highcross Street, the modern area of Blackfriars.

== 18th century ==
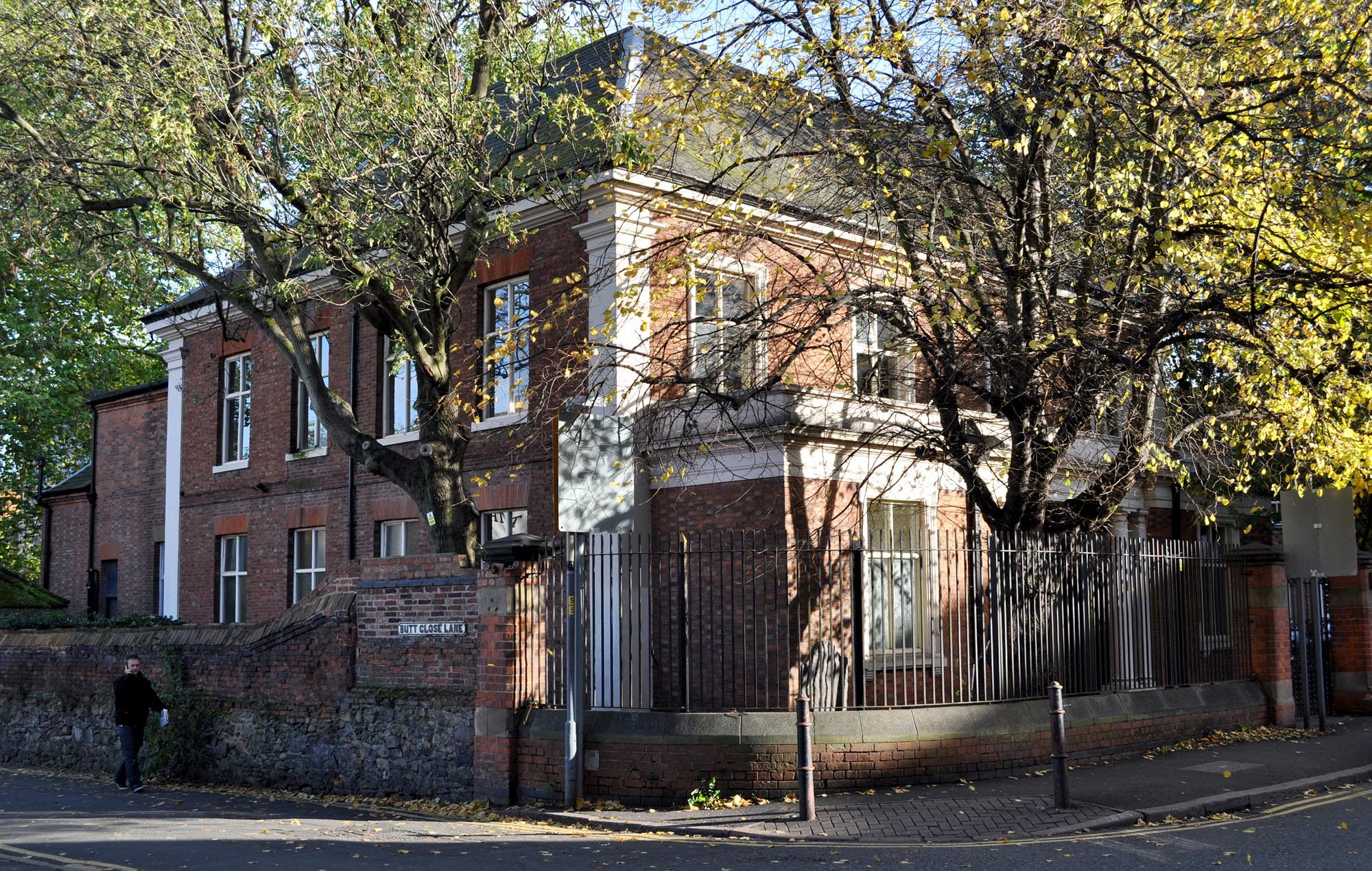
Leicester Unitarian Great Meeting House opened in 1708. John Wesley preached here in 1753.

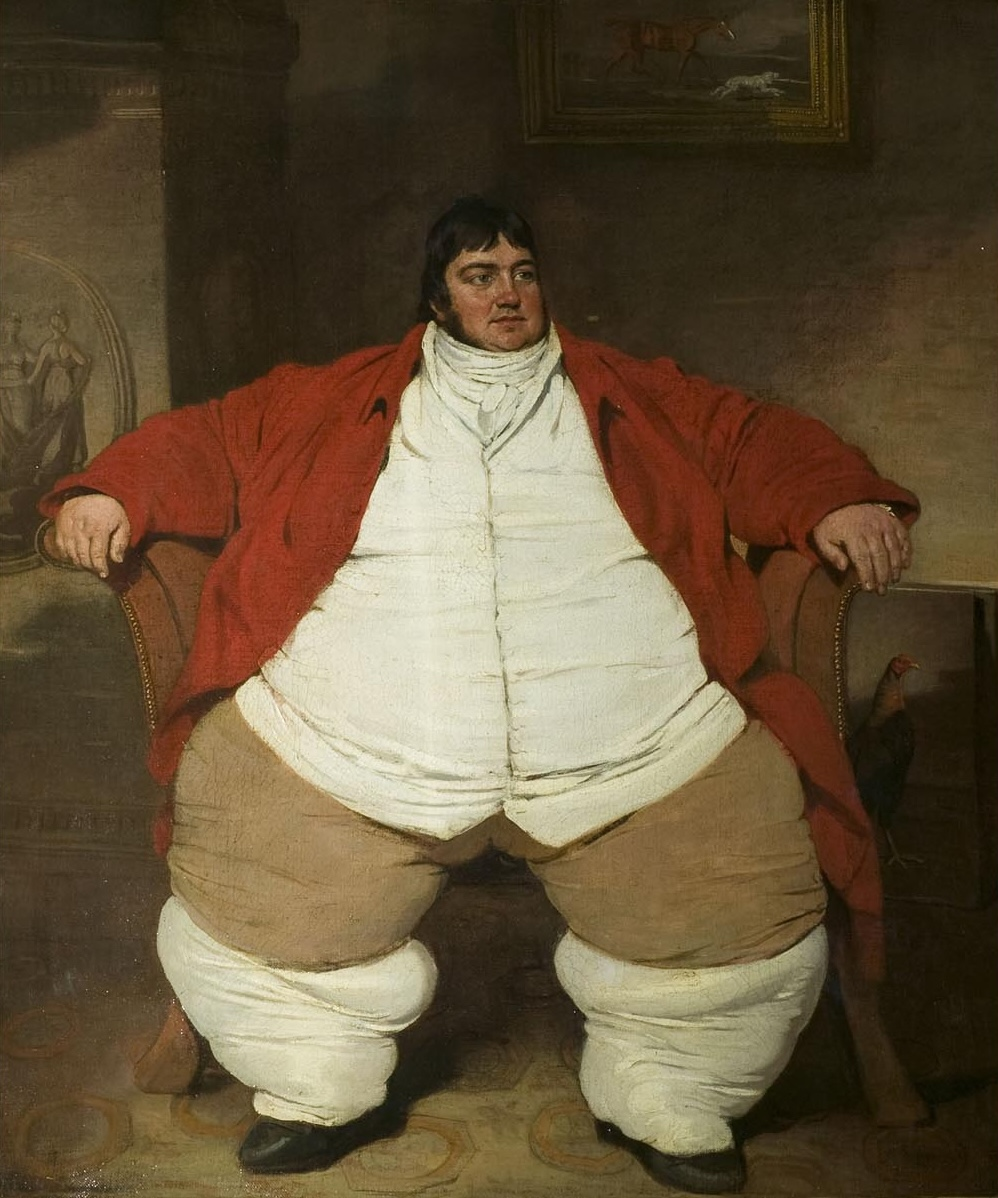
Daniel Lambert, Leicester's largest son, born in the borough in 1770.

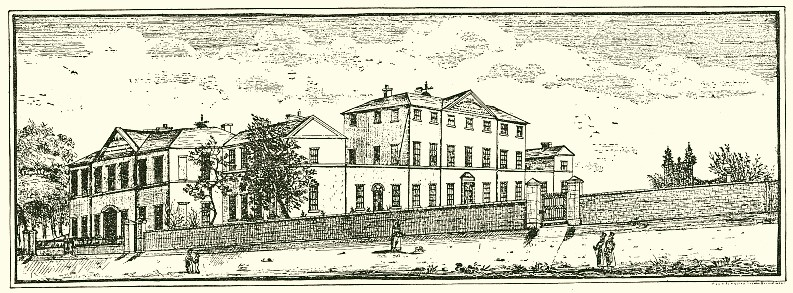
Leicester Royal Infirmary opened in 1771.

- 1708 — Great Meeting House constructed for the towns Protestant Dissenters on the corner of East Bond Street and Butt Close Lane. Today Leicester Unitarian Chapel.
- 1717 – Last English witch trial conducted by Leicester Assizes. The two accused women, both of Wigston, were acquitted by the jury who disregarded the testimony of 25 witnesses.
- 1751 – Leicester Journal newspaper began publication.
- 1753 — John Wesley, father of the Methodist movement, made the first of about a dozen visits to Leicester. He stayed and preached at the Great Meeting House on Butt Close Lane.
- 1760 – Leicester's last recorded accusation of witchcraft. Two elderly ladies of Glenn Magna accused one another of witchcraft and were subjected to the ducking stool, which one passed and the other failed. Other accusations followed. The only court proceedings to arise were fines for rioting as the crime of witchcraft was removed from the statute books.
- 1770 – Daniel Lambert was born in Leicester
- 1771 – Leicester Royal Infirmary opened.
- 1773 – The High Cross in High Street was removed.
- 1785 – The Greencoat School was established with money left by Alderman Gabriel Newton .
- 1789 — William Carey became minister of Leicesters Particular Baptist congregation. He is regarded as a key founding figure in the global Protestant missionary movement, widely known as Father of modern missions.
- 1792 – Leicester Chronicle newspaper began publication.
- 1794 – The corporation sanctioned several fairs.

== 19th century ==
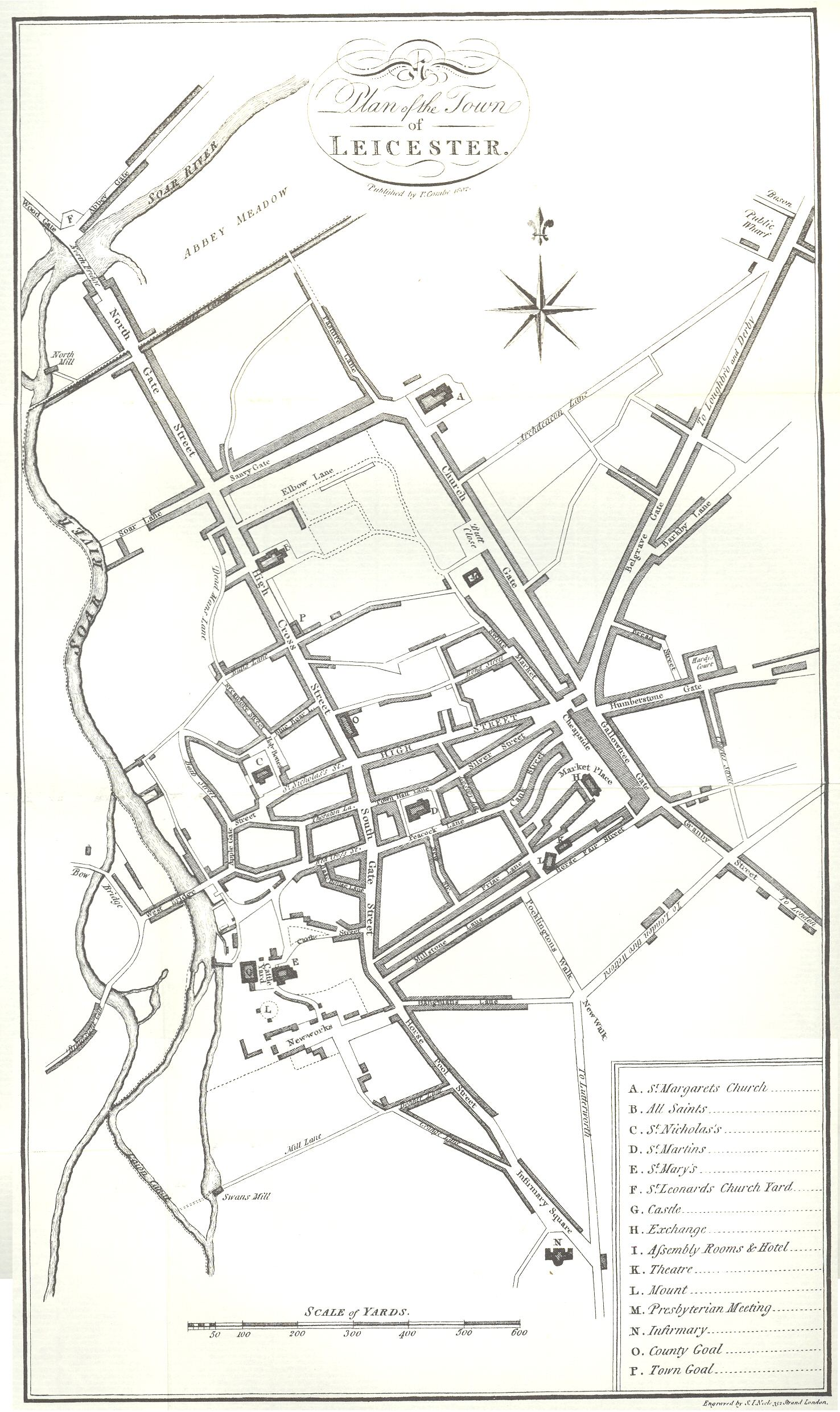
Map of Leicester in 1804

=== 1800s – 1810s ===
- 1800
  - The City Rooms were opened.
  - Leicester Medical Book Society founded.
- 1801 – Population: 17,005.
- 1804 – The common lands around the ancient city, including South Fields, North Fields, and High Fields, were controversially enclosed.
- 1806 – Racecourse established.
- 1816 – James Towle, notable Luddite, was executed in the city on 20 November. Two more Luddites were executed the following year.
- 1817 – Leicester Savings Bank established.

=== 1820s ===
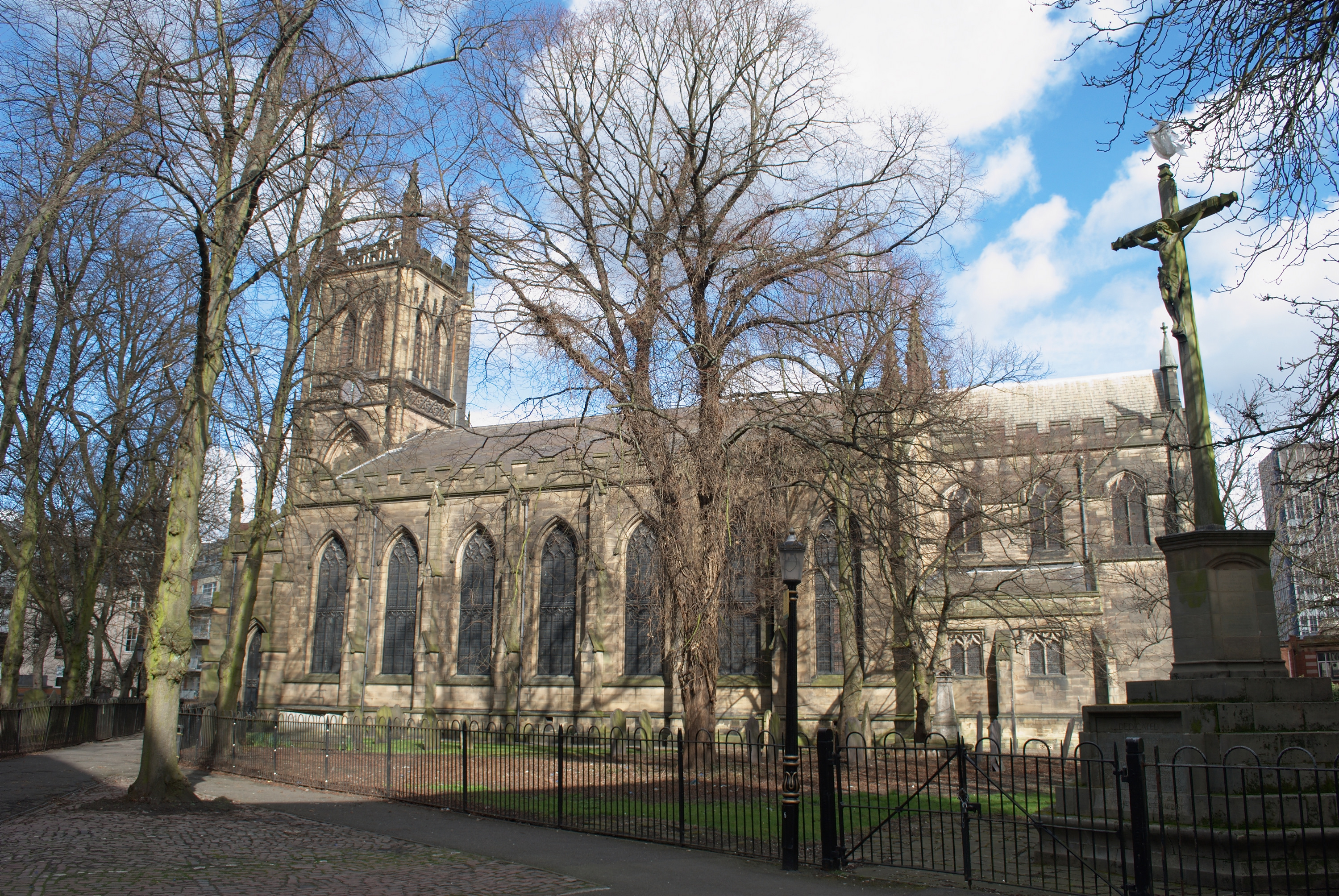
St. George the Martyr, first parish church constructed in Leicester since the reformation

- 1821 – Leicester Gas Company was established.
- 1825 – Wharf Street Cricket Ground opened, home to the Leicestershire County Cricket Club.
- 1827 – St George parish church, constructed to serve the new suburb built in South Fields, completed.
- 1828 – The new Leicester Prison opened on Welford Road.

=== 1830s ===
- 1832 — Leicester and Swannington Railway began operating.
- 1833 — Leicester Corporation refused to hand over records to Royal commissioners tasked by Earl Grey, the Prime Minister, with investigating municipal corruption.
- 1835 – Leicester Literary and Philosophical Society founded.
- 1836
  - Leicester Borough Police Force was established.
  - The Theatre Royal opened in Horsefair Street.
- 1837 – Leicester's Church of England parishes transferred from the control of Lincoln Diocese to the Diocese of Peterborough during a redrawing of diocesan boundaries. Peterborough Cathedral became Leicester's Cathedral Church and remained so until the establishment of the Diocese of Leicester in 1926 and the elevation of St Martin's Church, Leicester to cathedral status in 1927.
- 1838
  - Union Workhouse built.
  - Holy Trinity Parish Church first constructed.
- 1839 – Christ Church Bow Street, a chapel of ease to St Margaret's, was consecrated by Bishop John Kaye on 28 June.

=== 1840s ===
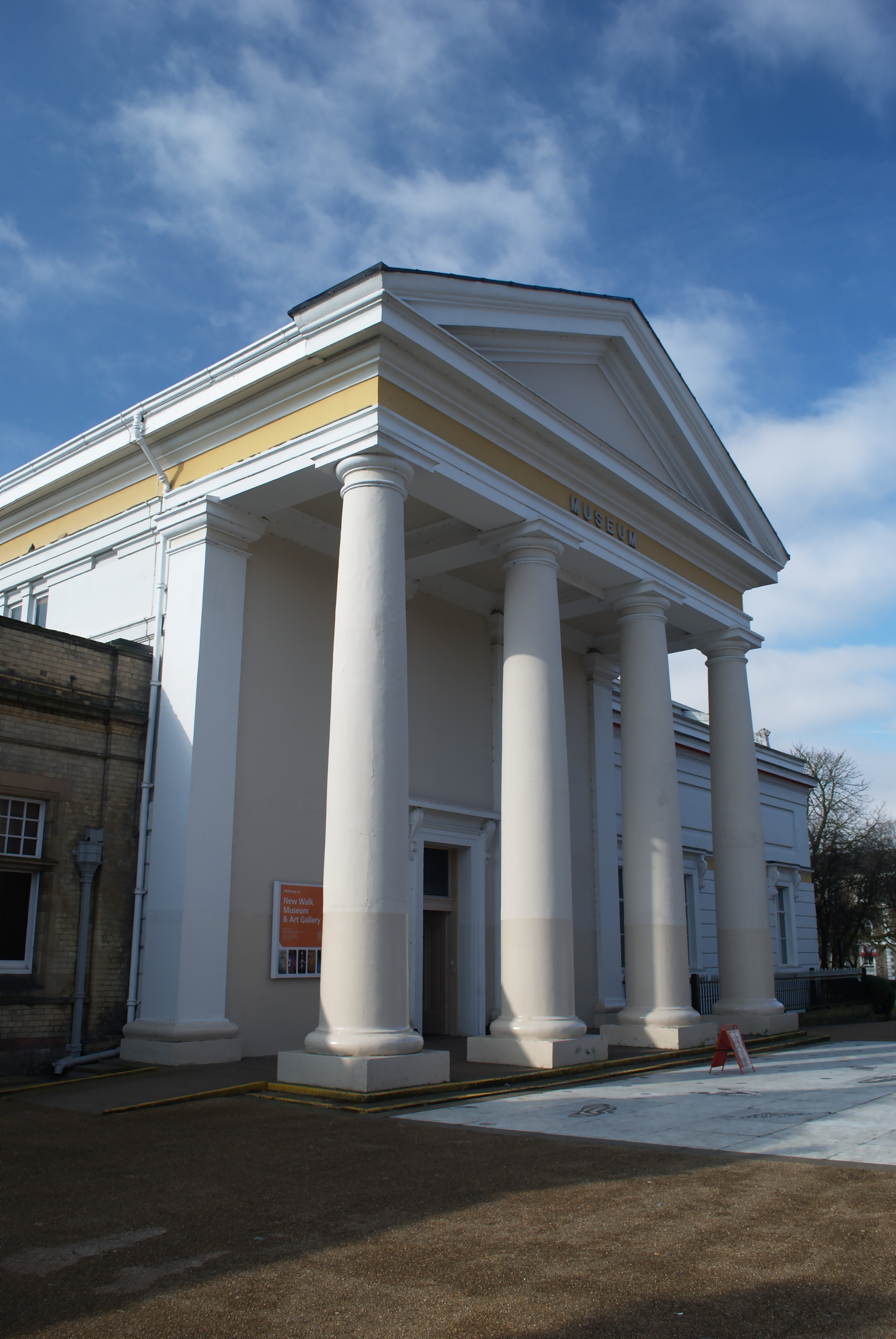
New Walk Museum & Art Gallery, opened in 1849

- 1840 – The Midland Counties Railway from Derby to Rugby opened the Campbell Street Station in Leicester.
- 1845 – Particular Baptist Chapel opened.
- 1849
  - Chamber of Commerce established.
  - Leicester Museum & Art Gallery opened.

=== 1850s ===
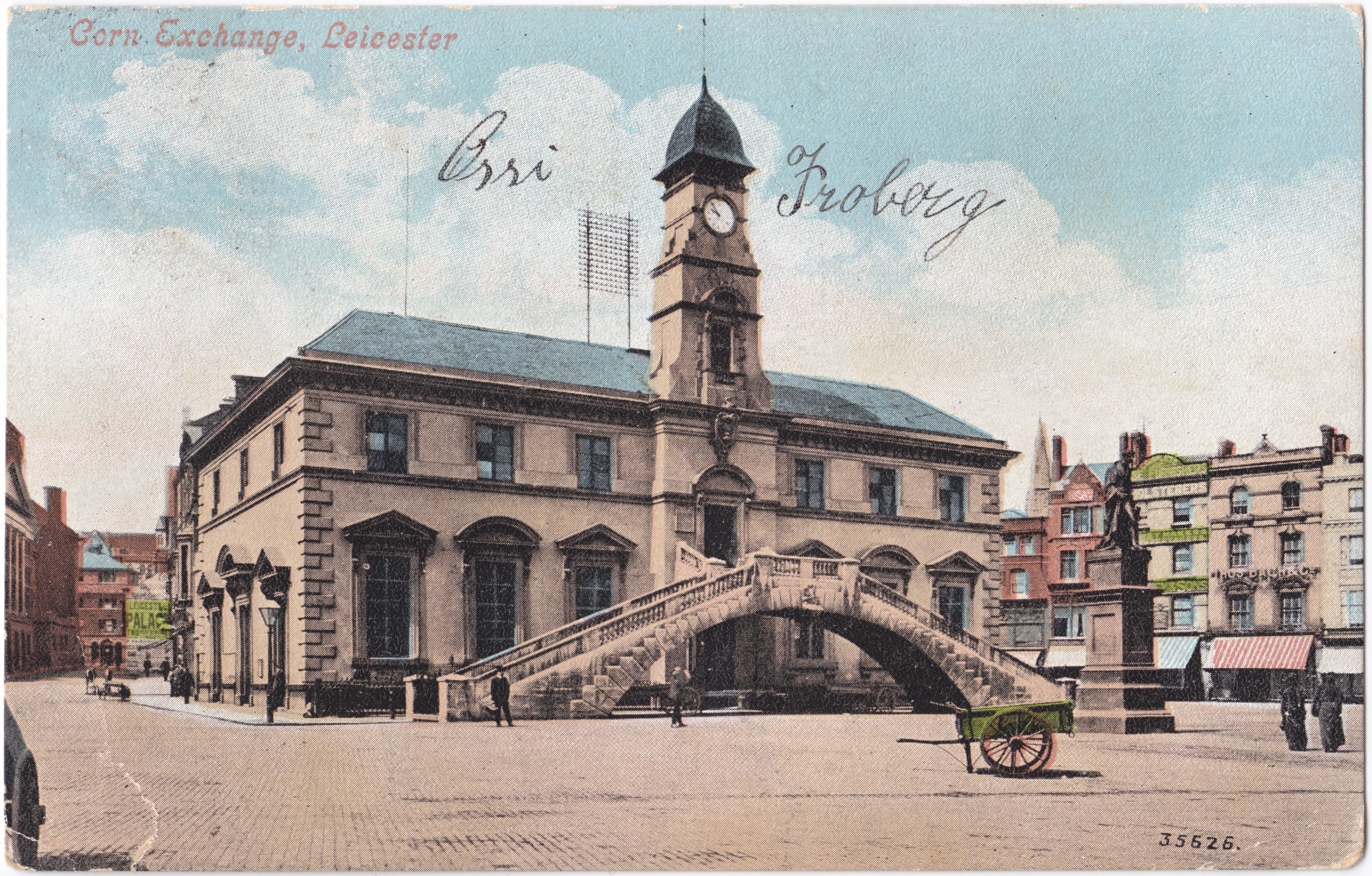
The Corn exchange opened in 1855, pictured in 1906

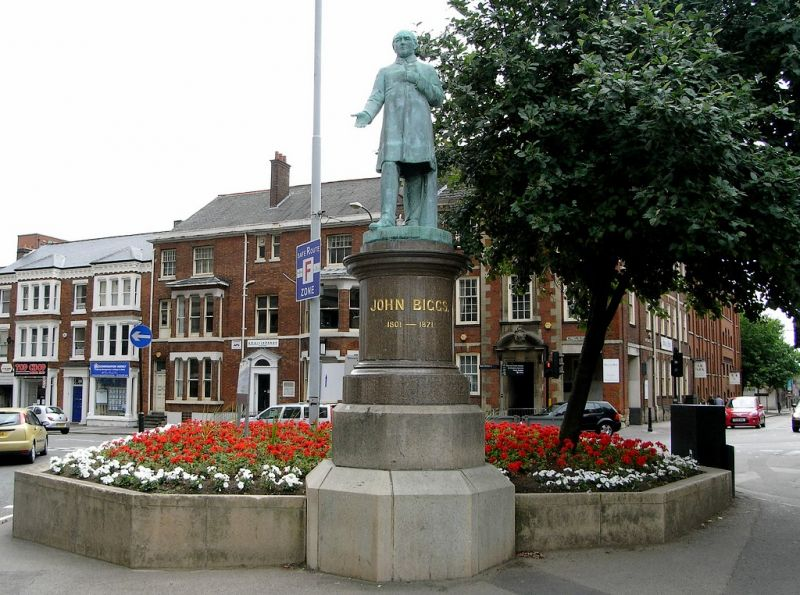
Statue of John Biggs, elected Leicester MP in 1857, in Welford Place

- 1851
  - A pumping station was built near the River Soar under the Leicester Sewerage Act.
  - Leicester Secular Society first established, the first Freethought Secular Society in the world.
- 1853
  - Rowe's Circulating Library in business.
  - Leicester gained its first piped water supply
- 1855 — Leicester Corn Exchange constructed in Leicester Market.
- 1857
  - John Biggs, local hosiery manufacturer and radical liberal, was elected MP for the borough. He is commemorated with a statue in Welford Place.
  - Hitchin-Leicester railway began operating.
  - Leicester Guardian newspaper began publication.
- 1858 — Henry Norman, later journalist, Liberal MP, and Baronet, was born in the borough on 19 September.

=== 1860s ===
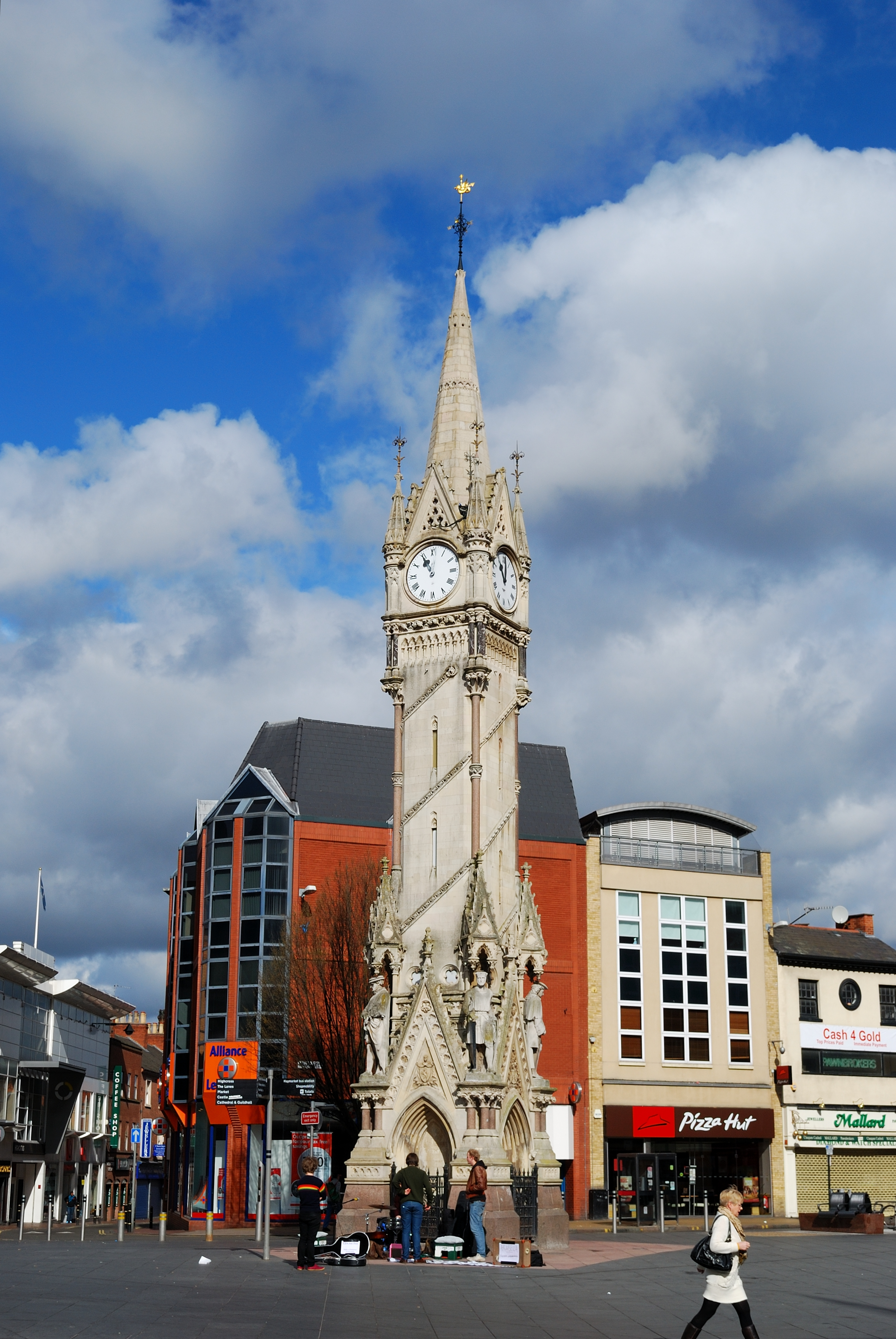
Haymarket Memorial Clock Tower erected in 1868

- 1861 – Population: 68,056.
- 1862 – Joseph Merrick, the "Elephant Man", was born in Leicester on 5 August.
- 1863 – The Old Bow Bridge was demolished and replaced with an iron bridge.
- 1864
  - South Leicestershire Railway (Hinckley-Leicester) began operating.
  - Leicester balloon riot.
- 1866
  - Leicester's first working men's club opened.
  - The Collegiate School for Girls opened.
- 1867
  - Major restoration work to St Martin's Church begun in 1860 was completed; the tower and spire having been dismantled and rebuilt.
  - Leicester Secular Society refounded.
- 1868
  - Haymarket Memorial Clock Tower erected depicting four historic heroes of the city: Simon de Montfort, Thomas White, William Wyggeston and Gabriel Newton.
  - St Luke's Church on the corner of Humberstone Road and Bell Lane consecrated by William Connor Magee, the Lord Bishop of Peterborough between 1868 and 1891.

=== 1870s ===
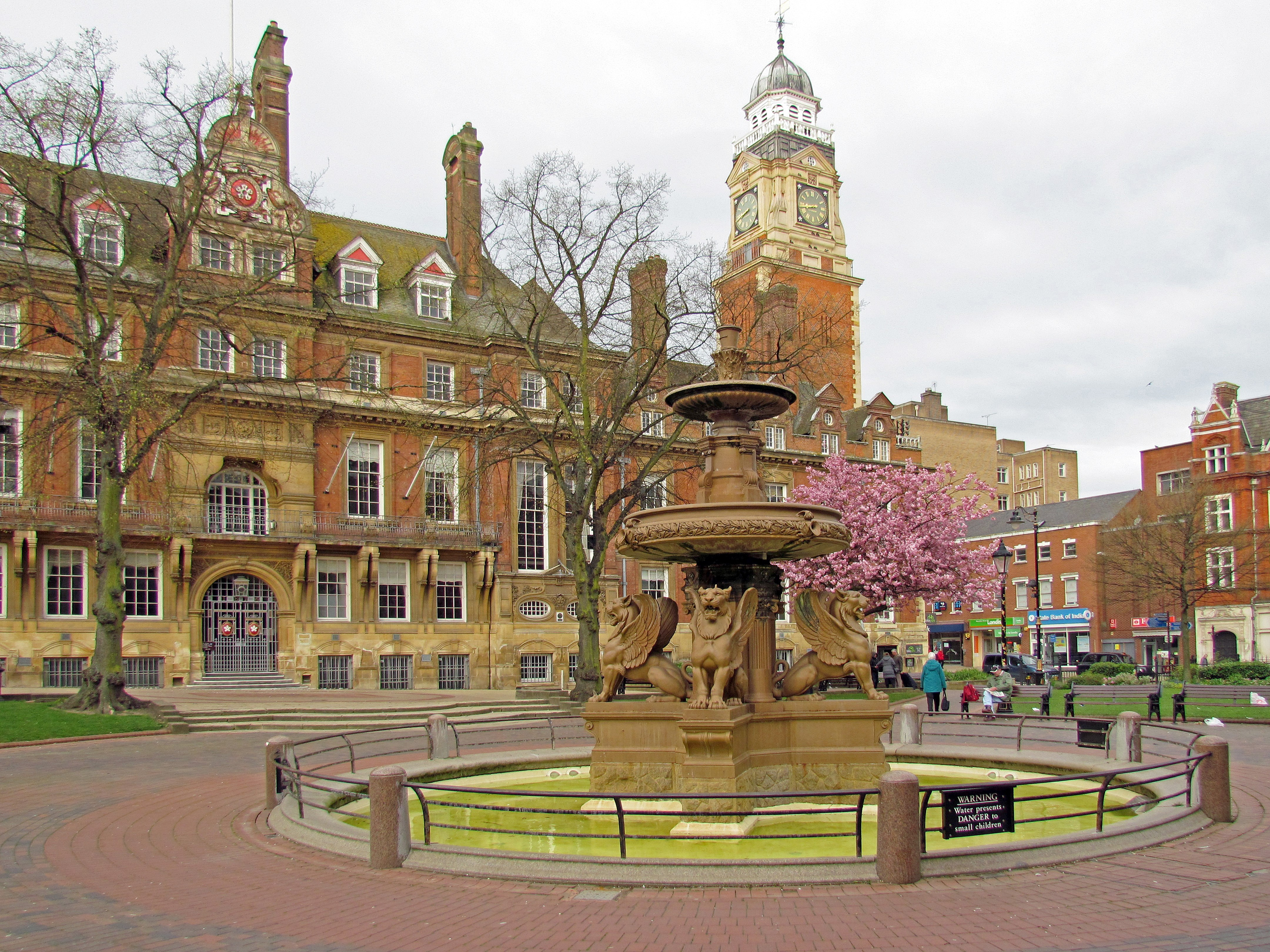
Leicester Town Hall constructed 1876

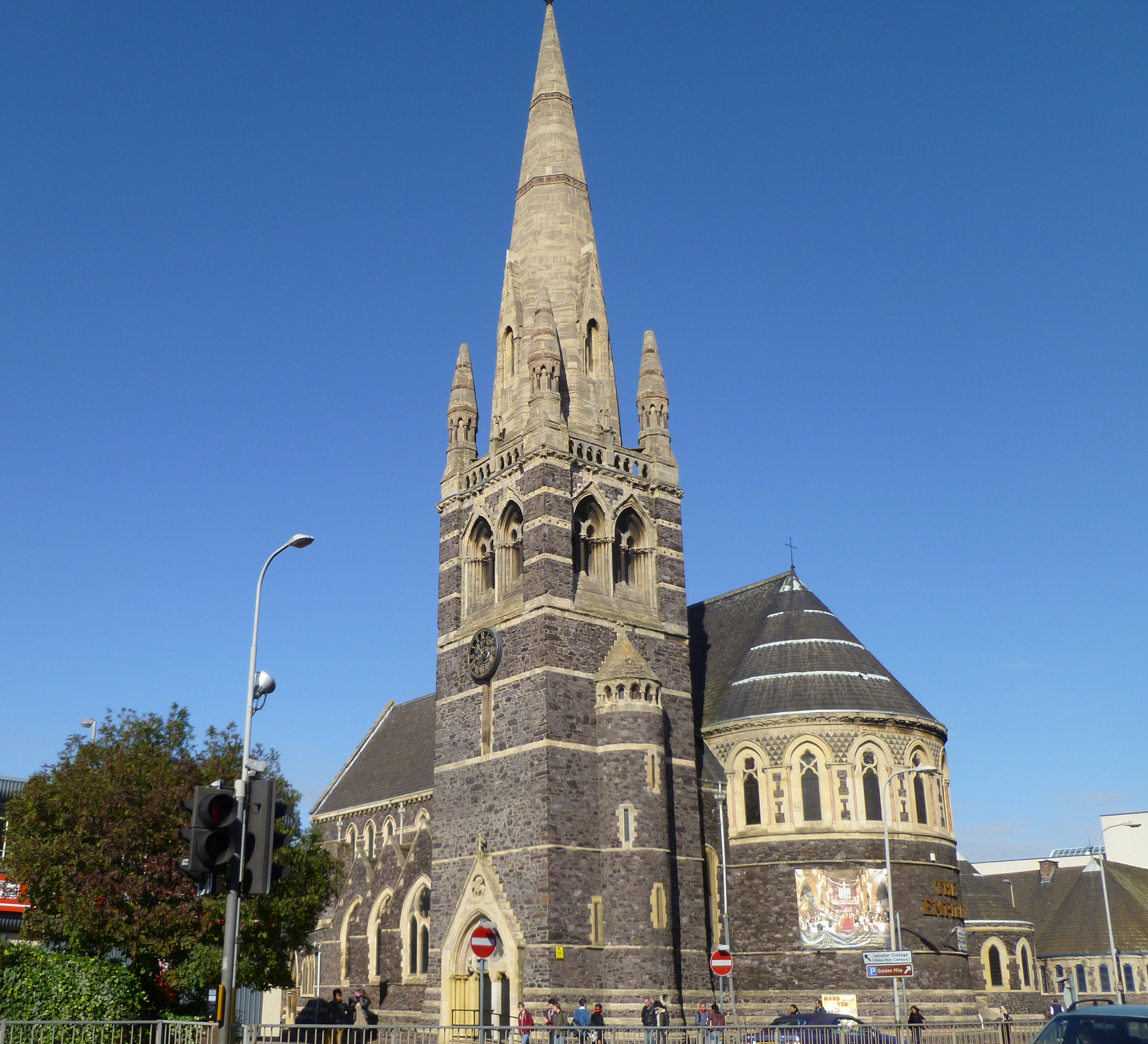
St Mark's, Belgrave Road consecrated in 1872

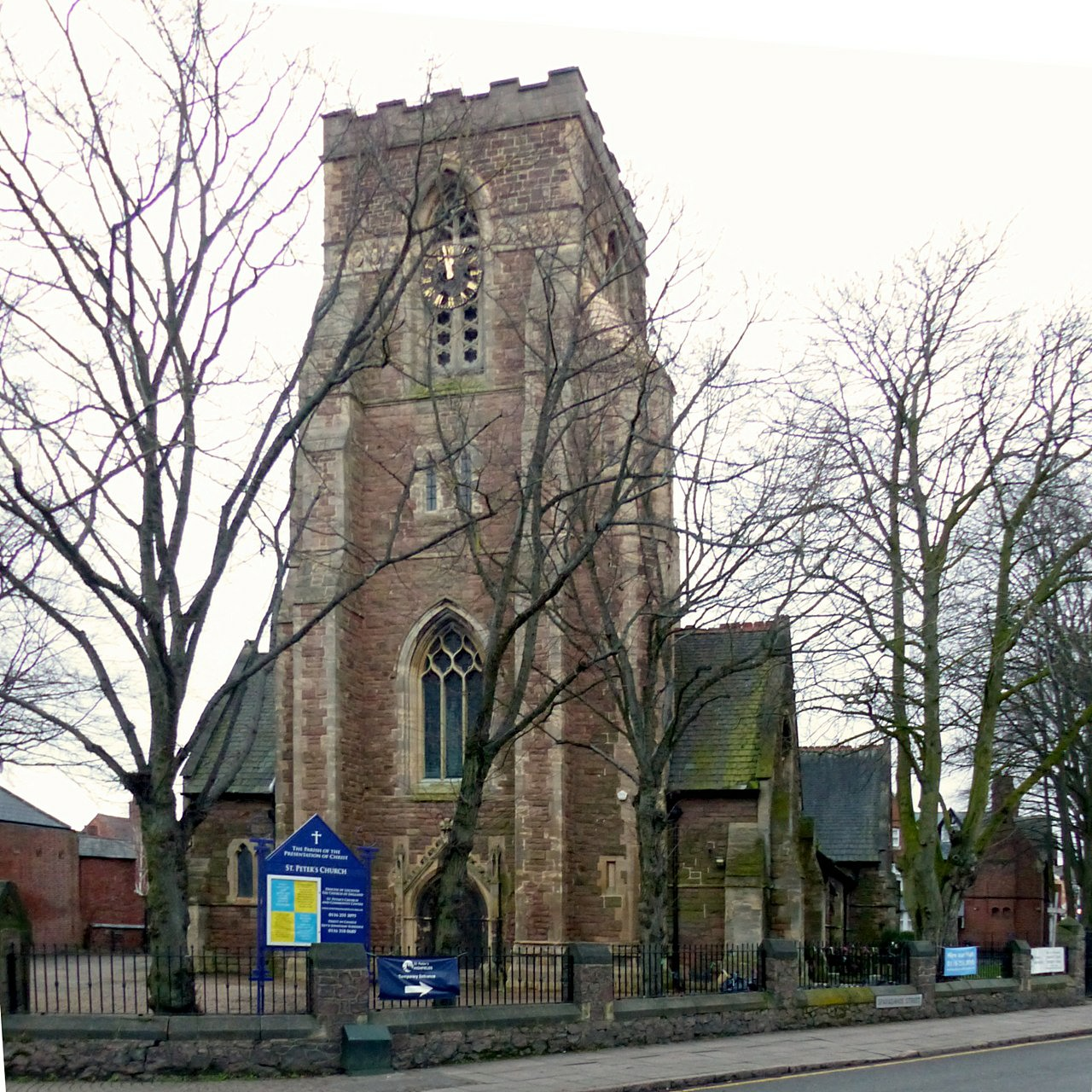
St. Peter's Highfields constructed and consecrated in the early 1870s

- 1870 – Leicester School of Art founded (ancestor of the Leicester Polytechnic College and today's De Montfort University).
- 1871
  - Population: 95,084.
  - The statue of Robert Hall, notable Leicestrian Baptist Minister, was unveiled in De Montfort Square, New Walk.
  - The Free Library opened in Wellington Street.
- 1872
  - Leicester Borough Fire Brigade was established.
  - St Mark's Parish Church, Belgrave consecrated by Bishop Magee.
- 1874
  - Leicester's first horse-drawn tram service began operating, from the Clock Tower to Belgrave.
  - Leicester Mercury newspaper began publication.
  - 16 April – St. Peter's Parish Church, Highfields consecrated by Bishop Magee.
- 1875 – Trams begin operating from the town centre to Victoria Park and Humberstone.
- 1876
  - Leicester Town Hall was built.
  - Leicester Co-operative Hosiery Manufacturing Society organised.
- 1877
  - The Wyggeston Hospital School opened.
  - Skating rink opened in Rutland Street.
  - Leicester Bicycling Club active (approximate date).
  - The Opera House opened in Silver Street.
  - St Saviour's Parish Church consecrated by Bishop Magee.
  - Prebend Street Friends Meeting House opened, and the Leicester Quakers leave the old Blackfriars Northgates Meeting House.
- 1878 –
  - Leicestershire County Cricket Club's new ground at Grace Road opened.
  - Leicestershire Lawn Tennis Club Established.
- 1879 – The first municipal swimming baths open in Bath Lane.

=== 1880s ===
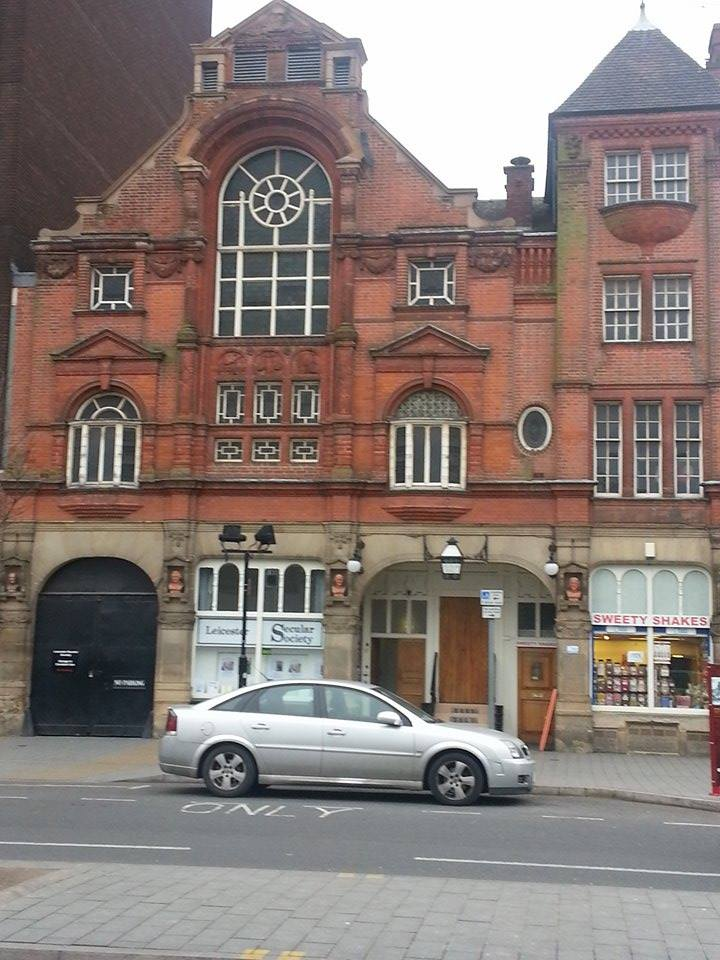
Leicester Secular Hall constructed in 1801

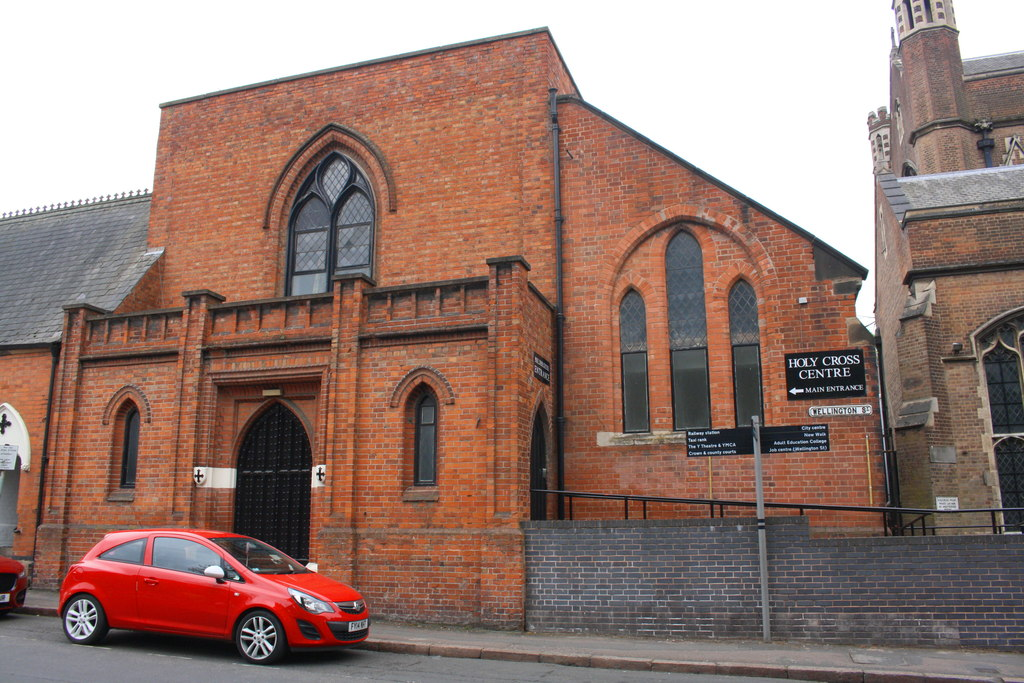
Holy Cross Priory, the structure of the old church is now used as the parish hall

- 1880 – Leicester Tigers Rugby Union Football Club was founded
- 1881
  - Population: 122,351.
  - Leicester Secular Hall built by the Secular Society on Humberstone Gate.
- 1882
  - Victoria Park and Abbey Park open.
  - Holy Cross Priory was established on land between New Walk & Wellington Street. First Roman Catholic church to be consecrated in the city since the reformation & a refoundation for the Blackfriars after the dissolution of St Clement's Priory in 1538.
- 1884 – Leicester Fosse football club formed.
- 1885 – Leicester and Leicestershire Photographic Society founded.
- 1886 – Spinney Hill Park opened.
- 1889
  - Leicester became a County borough per Local Government Act 1888.
  - Leicester Branch of the Socialist League organised.

=== 1890s ===
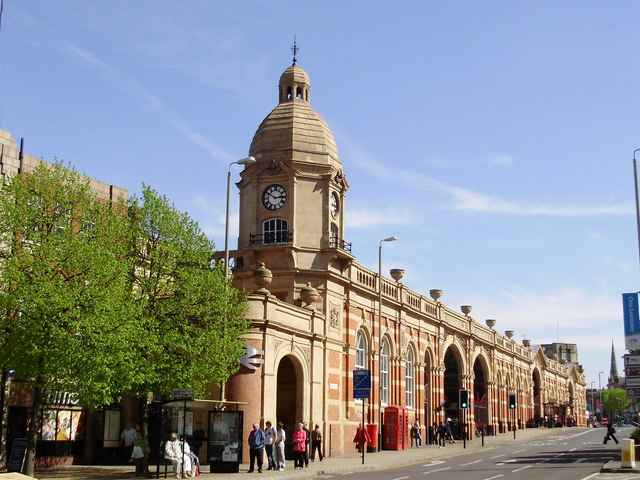
Leicester Railway Station rebuilt 1892–4

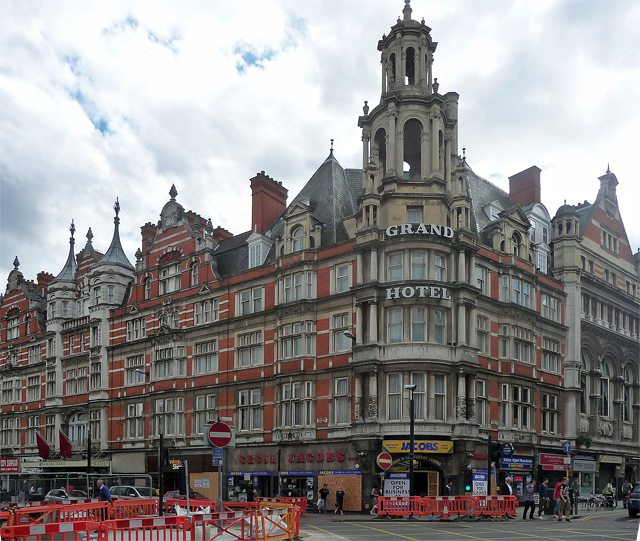
Grand Hotel constructed in 1898

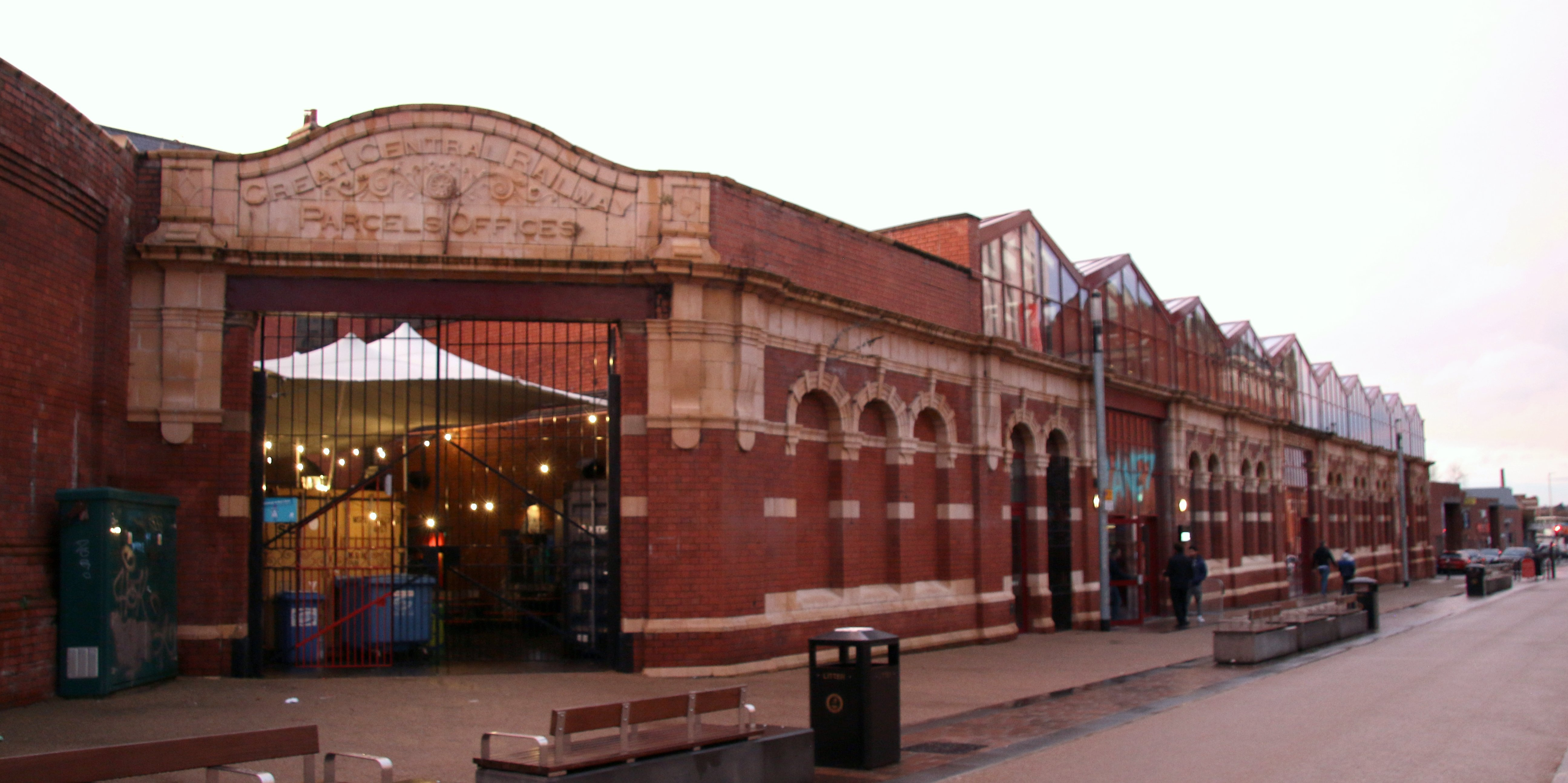
Leicester Great Central railway station opened 1899

- 1890
  - St Margaret's and All Saints united into a single parish by Letters Patent dated 8 July.
  - Church of the Martyrs on Westcotes Drive was consecrated by Bishop Magee.
- 1891
  - Population: 174,624.
  - Filbert Street stadium opened.
  - Abbey Pumping Station in operation.
  - The Borough of Leicester was greatly enlarged by the Leicester Extension Act, with the addition of Aylestone, Belgrave, Knighton, Newfoundpool and parts of Braunstone, Evington and Humberstone.
- 1892
  - Leicester Tigers moved to their new home at Welford Road Stadium
  - London Road Station, previously Campbell Street Station, was reconstructed.
  - Belgrave became part of Leicester
- 1894 – Leicester Fosse joined the Football League.
- 1896
  - Leicester Corporation purchased Gilroes and began laying out a cemetery there.
  - All of the civil parishes within the Borough of Leicester were merged into a single parish.
- 1898 – The Grand Hotel was built in Granby Street.
- 1899
  - British United Shoe Machinery was established in Belgrave Road.
  - Leicester Central railway station opened. (closed 1969)

== 20th century ==
=== 1900s ===
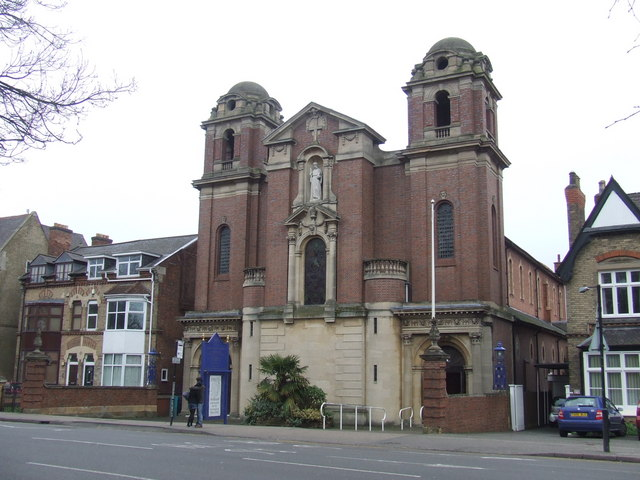
St James the Greater, consecrated in 1901

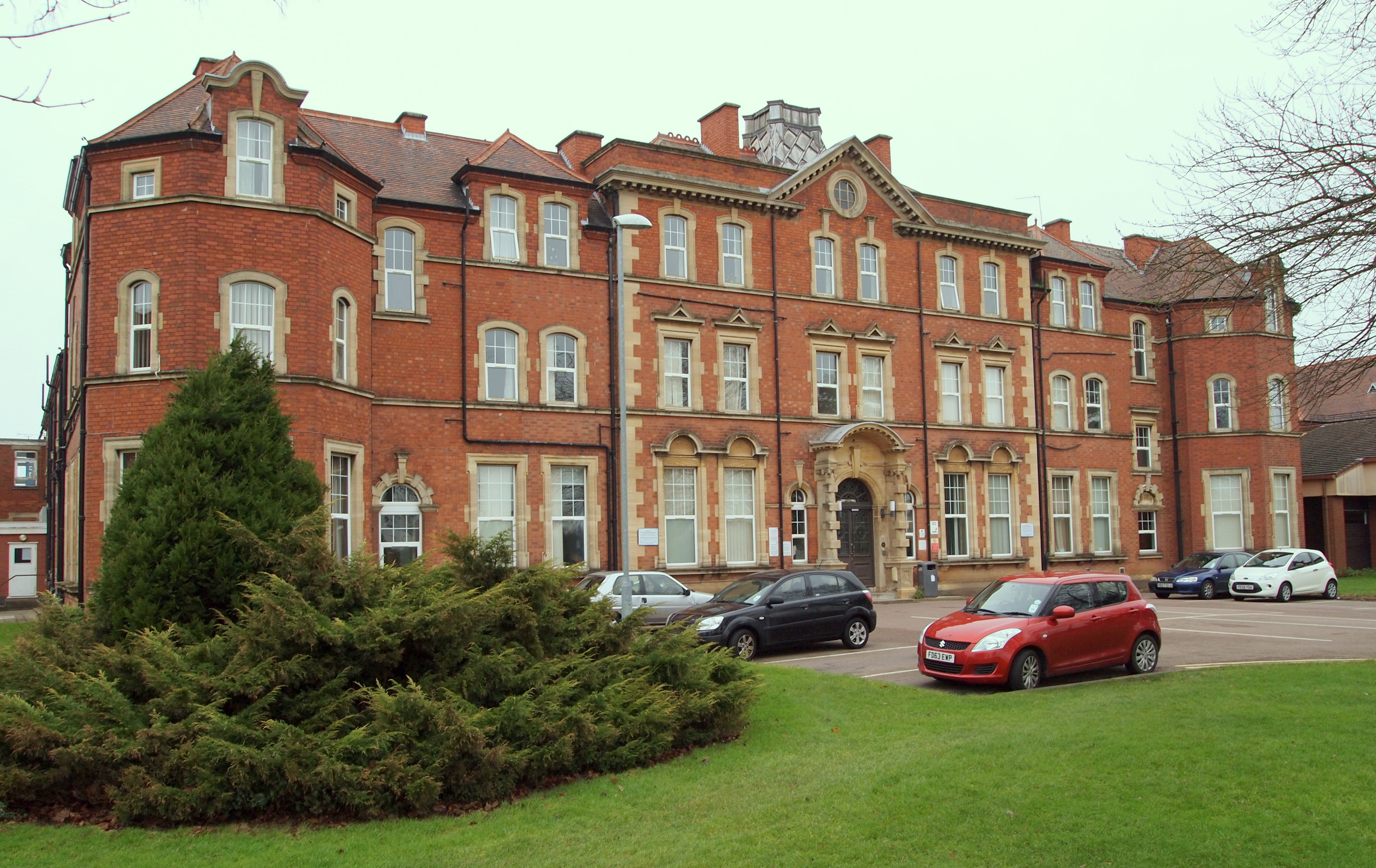
Leicester General Hospital opened in 1905

- 1901
  - Population: 211,579.
  - St James the Greater Parish Church was consecrated by Edward Carr Glyn, 25 July.
- 1904 – The conversion of Leicester's horse-drawn trams to electric trams was completed.
- 1905 – Leicester General Hospital opened.
- 1906 – Future Prime Minister James Ramsay MacDonald was elected as one of the two MPs for Leicester.

=== 1910s ===
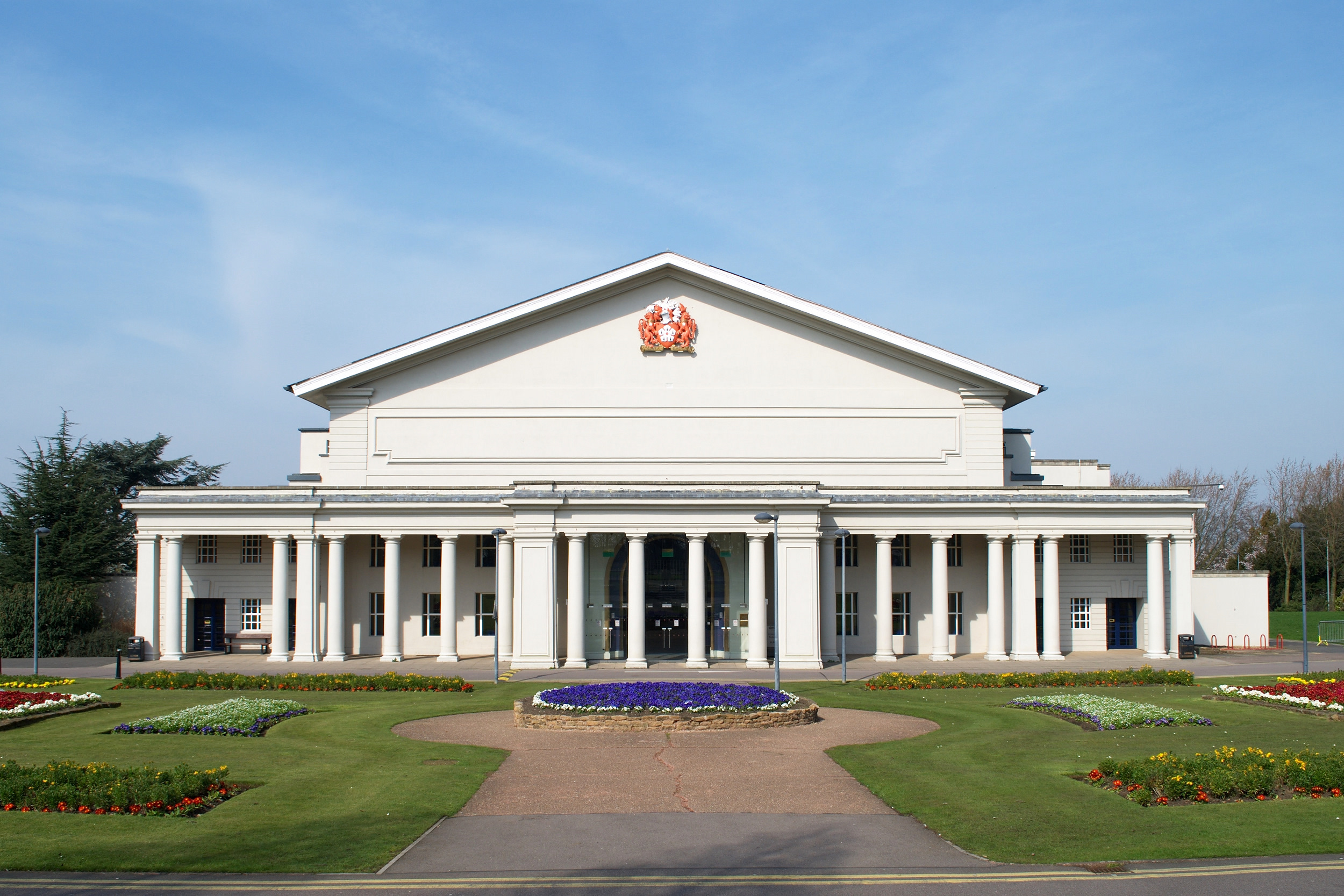
De Montfort Hall, opened in 1913

- 1911 — ‘Great Fire of Leicester’ - Church of St. George the Martyr & surrounding factories (today's Cultural Quarter) gutted by fire on 5 October, and subsequently rebuilt.
- 1913 – De Montfort Hall opened.
- 1918–1919 – the Spanish Influenza epidemic killed approximately 1600 people in Leicester.
- 1919
  - King George V and Queen Mary made a state visit the city on 10 June.
  - Leicester granted city status in the aftermath of the Royal visit in June. It was seen as a restoration of the historic city status held during Roman times.

=== 1920s ===
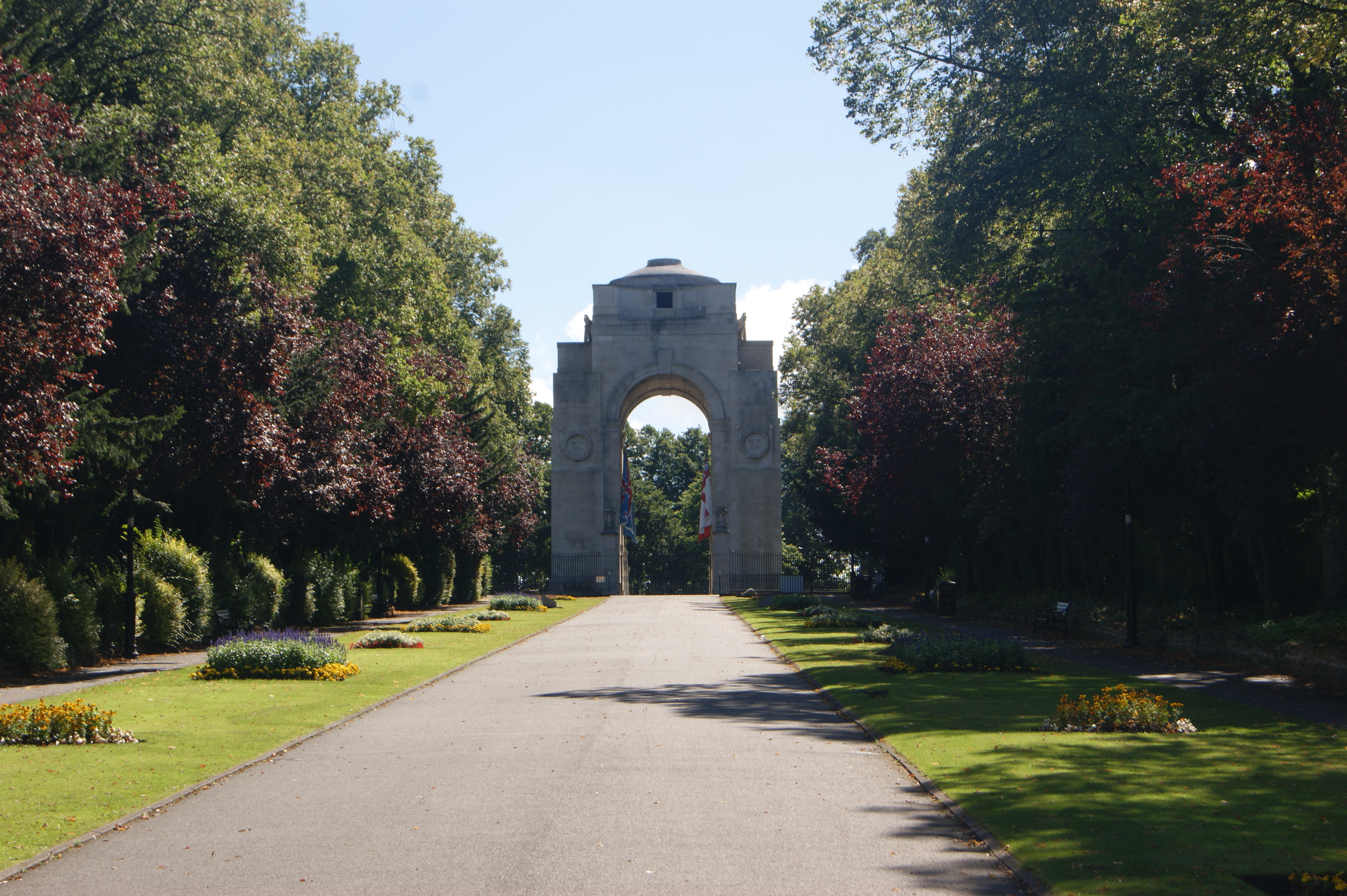
Arch of Remembrance, unveiled on 4 July 1925

- 1920 – The City Boys School opened.
- 1921
  - Population: 234,000.
  - The University College of Leicester was established.
- 1923 – In the General Election, Winston Churchill was the Liberal candidate in Leicester West and lost.
- 1925
  - Arch of Remembrance on Victoria Park completed. Designed by Edward Lutyens in memory of the sons of Leicester who died in the Great War. Unveiled by two local war widows, Mrs Elizabeth Butler and Mrs Annie Glover, in front of 30,000 people on 4 July.
  - Braunstone Frith was absorbed into the city of Leicester.
- 1926 – The Diocese of Leicester was established and the city's churches were allocated to it instead of the Diocese of Peterborough.
  - Dr. Cyril Bardsley was appointed the first Bishop of Leicester since the year 870.
- 1927 — St Martin's Church became Leicester Cathedral, the first church in the city with Cathedral status since the 8th or 9th century.

=== 1930s ===
- 1932 – The Little Theatre opened in Dover Street.
  - Charles Street reopened in June
  - Belgrave Gate was widened
- 1933
  - Joe Orton, noted satirical playwright, was born in the city on 1 January.
  - Leicester City Police Headquarters, designed by G. Noel Hill and A.T. Gooseman, opened in Charles Street.
- 1935
  - Humberstone, Knighton, New Parks and Beaumont Leys were absorbed into the city of Leicester.
  - Oswald Mosley and the Blackshirts (British Union of Fascists) held several demonstrations in the Market Place and Victoria Park and were heckled by members of the city's labour movement.
- 1936
  - The city boundaries were further extended to include most of Evington
  - Odeon Cinema opened.
  - The Jarrow Marchers arrived in Leicester on Thursday 23 October from Loughborough and continued on the next day to Market Harborough.

=== 1940s ===
- 1940 – Leicester suffered its worst air raid of World War II on the night of 19 November.
- 1946 – King George VI and Queen Elizabeth made a state visit to Leicester on 30 October. The visit was part of a tour marking the end of World War II.
- 1947 — University of Leicester Botanic Garden opened.

=== 1950s ===
- 1950 – St Luke's Church Humberstone Road demolished.
- 1955 – New Friends Meeting House opened on Queens Road. Prebend Street Meeting House closes permanently the following year.
- 1958
  - Buddy Holly and the Crickets performed live at De Montfort Hall on 6 March, perhaps the city's first Rock n Roll performance.
  - Queen Elizabeth II visited the city on 9 May, the first of her visited to the city as monarch.
  - Christ Church on Bow Street were demolished along with its parish school.
  - The construction of Vaughan Way and Burleys Way began in July 1958.
- 1959
  - Andrew Bailey, Chief Cashier (2004–2011) and later Governor (2020–present) of the Bank of England, was born in the city on 30 March.
  - Vaughan Way and Burleys Way were opened in May 1959.

=== 1960s ===
- 1960 — Gary Lineker, noted football player and commentator, was born in the city on 30 November.
- 1962 – Jewry Wall Museum built.
- 1963 – The Beatles performed live at De Montfort Hall for the first time.
- 1966
  - St Luke's Church Stocking Farm was consecrated 29 April, a replacement to the lost Humberstone Street St Luke's.
  - Southgates Underpass and St Nicholas Circle started in August 1966.
  - The City of Leicester Polytechnic was established.
- 1968 - Southgates Underpass and St Nicholas Circle opened on 2 May
  - St Margaret's Way construction began in November 1968, in former Lower Church Gate.
- 1969 – The Museum of the Royal Leicestershire Regiment opened in the Magazine Gateway.

=== 1970s ===
- 1970
  - University of Leicester's Attenborough Building constructed.
  - St Margaret's Way and Belgrave Circle were constructed; they were opened on Saturday 2 May.
- 1972 – Abbey Pumping Station museum opened.
- 1973
  - Haymarket Shopping Centre in business.
  - Leicester Theatre Trust formed.
  - Belgrave Flyover construction started in January
- 1974 – Leicester City Council established according to Local Government Act 1972.
- 1975 - St Matthews Way, Burleys Flyover, roundabout and Waterloo Way construction started January 1975
- 1979 — Leicester Chronicle ceased publication after 187 years.

=== 1980s ===
- 1980 — Leicester Royal Infirmary extension opened by Queen Elizabeth II and Prince Philip on 14 March.
- 1985 – St Margaret's Bus Station re-opened with new buildings.

=== 1990s ===
- 1992 – The Leicester Polytechnic became De Montfort University.
- 1993 – Queen Elizabeth II visited the city on 9 December.
- 1997
  - Leicester City Council became unitary authority per 1990s UK local government reform.
  - Leicester Bike Park opened.

== 21st century ==
=== 2000s ===
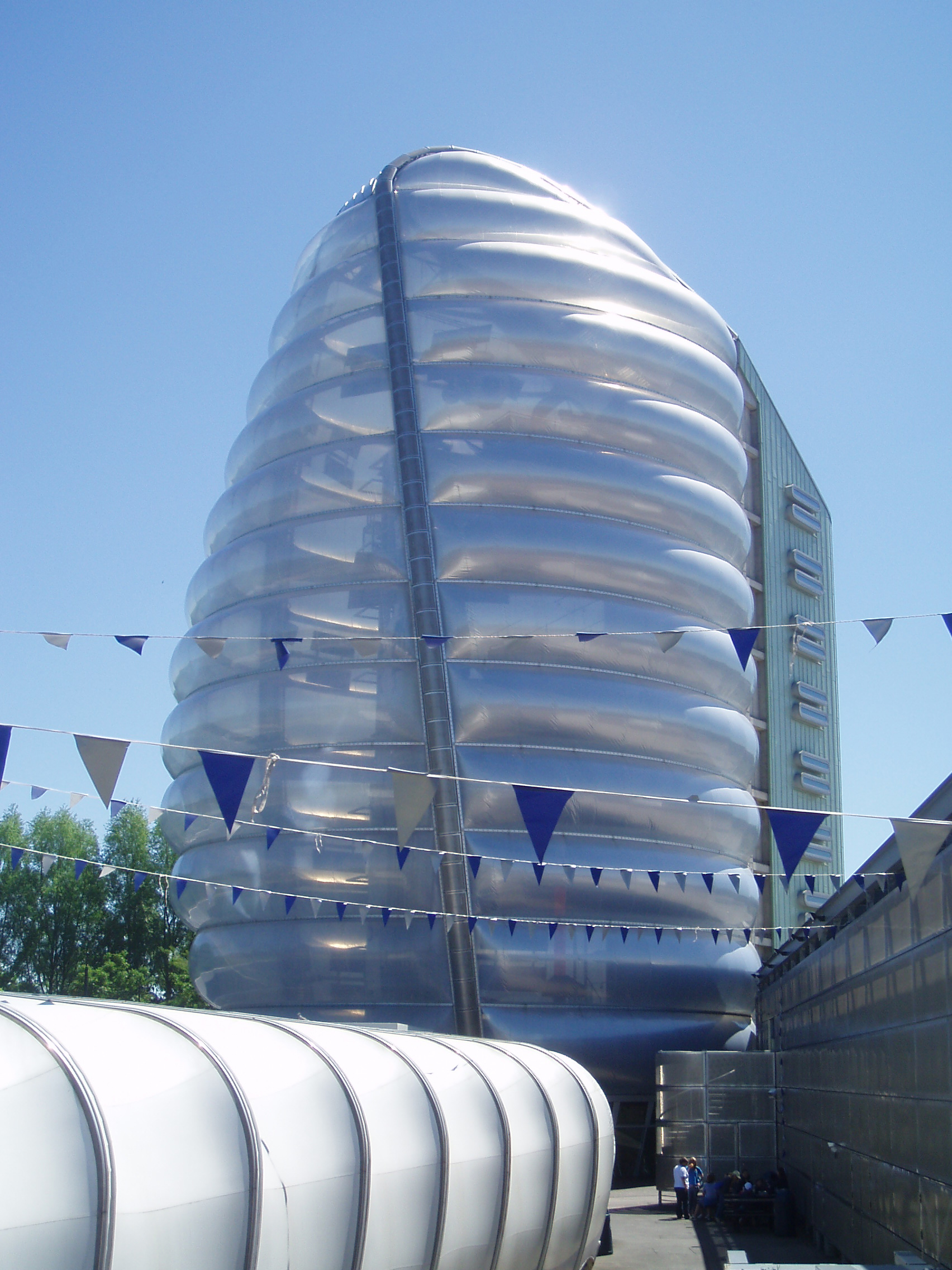
National Space Centre, opened 1 August 2002.

- 2002
  - National Space Centre opened by the Queen on 1 August.
  - Filbert Street Stadium closes after 110 years of serving Leicester City.
  - New Leicester City Stadium opened.
- 2005 — Peepul Arts Centre opened.
- 2007 – Statue of St Margaret of Antioch relocated from Corah Works to the front of St Margaret's Church.
- 2008
  - Leicester Statue of Liberty re-erected at the foot of Upperton Road.
  - Curve theatre opened by the Queen on 4 December.

=== 2010s ===
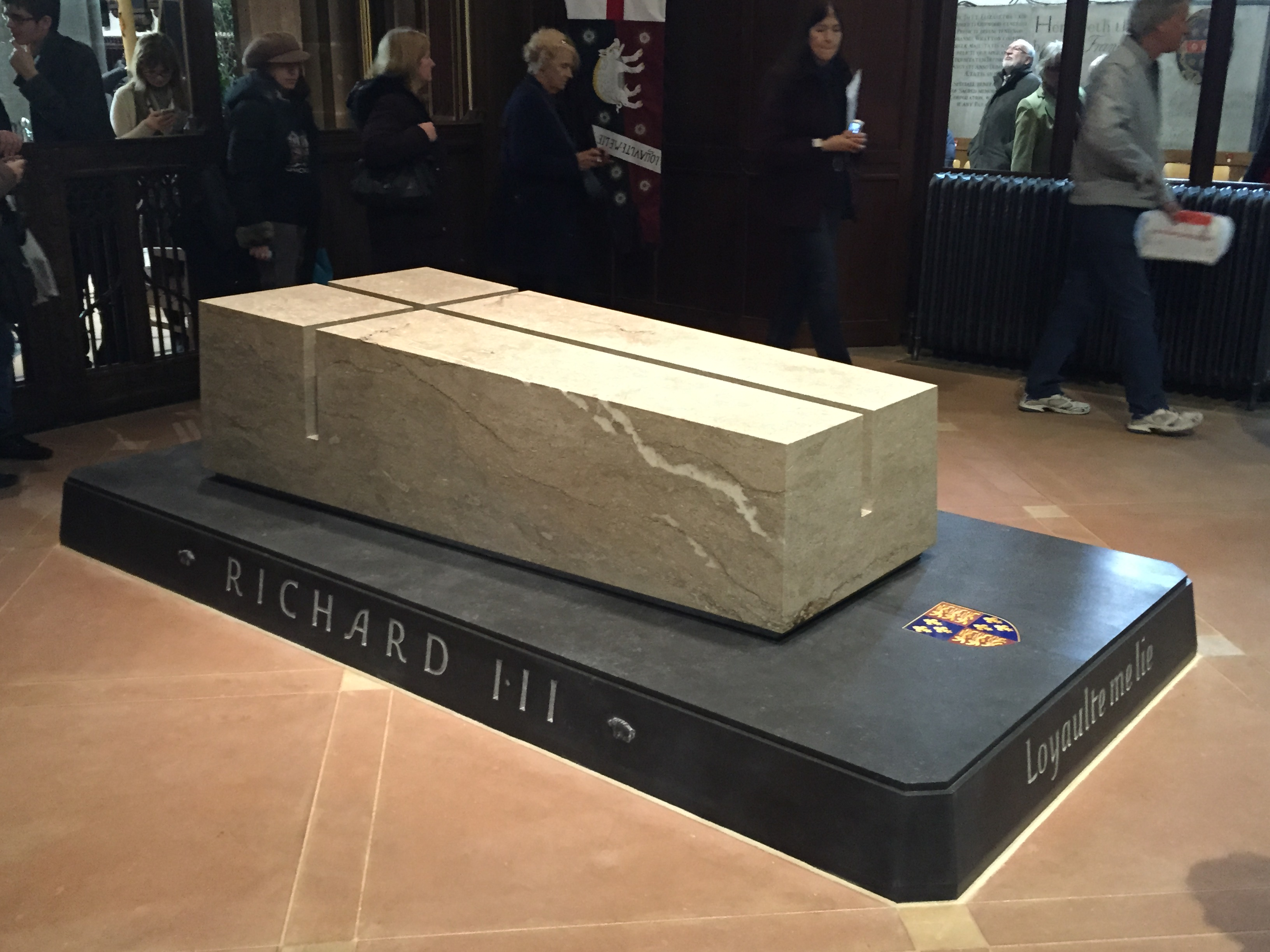
The new tomb of Richard III, erected over his reburial site in Leicester Cathedral

- 2010
  - 25 September - Leicester City Council unanimously votes to ban a proposed far right demonstration in the city planned for 9 October.
  - 4 October - Theresa May, then Home Secretary, issues a ban on all protests in Leicester city centre for Friday 9 October, discouraging would-be protesters with promises of hefty fines and prison sentences.
  - 10 October - around 2000 protesters from the far right English Defence League and associated groups gathered from across England and rioted in the lower part of Humberstone Gate outside the Secular Hall. A counter demonstration of around 1000 locals, involving key citizens such as the council leader Peter Soulsby and the Bishop of Leicester Tim Stevens, was held in the upper part of Humberstone Gate outside the Haymarket Shopping Centre. The counter protest was also joined by around 600 protesters from Unite Against Fascism. The protest had been delayed from 9 October to avoid the Home Secretary's ban. It resulted Leicestershire Constabulary's largest policing operation in 25 years and 13 arrests.
- 2011 – Institution of a new elected City Mayor (as distinct from the ancient office of Lord Mayor). The first mayoral election was held on 5 May (see 2011 Leicester Mayoral Election.
- 2012:
  - Queen Elizabeth II, the Duke of Edinburgh, and the Duchess of Cambridge visit Leicester during the Queen's Diamond Jubilee tour of Britain.
  - The remains of King Richard III were discovered beneath a car park on the site of the former Greyfriars chapel.
- 2015 — Reinterment of Richard III in Leicester Cathedral (26 March).
- 2016 — Leicester City won the 2015–16 Premier League on 2 May as their first league title, having been 5000-to-1 outsiders at the start of the season. Large civic festivities followed and the team subsequently won the BBC Sports Personality Team of the Year Award.

=== 2020s ===
- 2020–2022 – The COVID-19 pandemic. Between 13 March 2020 and 19 December 2022 the city reported 128,123 cases of the virus and the lives of 1,171 of its citizens were lost to it. The city was one of Britain's worst affected and was subject to an additional hundred days of lockdown.
- 2020 – New St Margaret's Bus Station building completed in November and opened 31 December.
- 2022 – The 2022 Leicester unrest. A notable summer outbreak of ethno-religious tension between members of the city's Hindu and Muslim communities.
- 2024 – Tension between a Far Right protest and an Anti Racist protest around East Gates and the Haymarket Memorial Clock Tower and other instances of unrest, 6 August (part of the 2024 United Kingdom riots).

== See also ==
- History of Leicester
- History of Leicestershire
- Timelines of other cities in East Midlands: Derby, Lincoln, Nottingham
