= New Walk (disambiguation) =

New Walk may refer to:

- New Walk, York a promenade beside the Ouse established in 1730
- New Walk, Leicester a thoroughfare in Leicester three-quarters of a mile long stretching from Welford Place to Granville Road, which has been pedestrianised since 1785
  - New Walk Museum and art gallery, on New Walk
  - New Walk, a poetry and arts magazine, published in Leicester
