= Leicester Austin Friars =

Dissolved priory of Augustinian Friars in Leicester, England (1254-1538)

Leicester Austin Priory
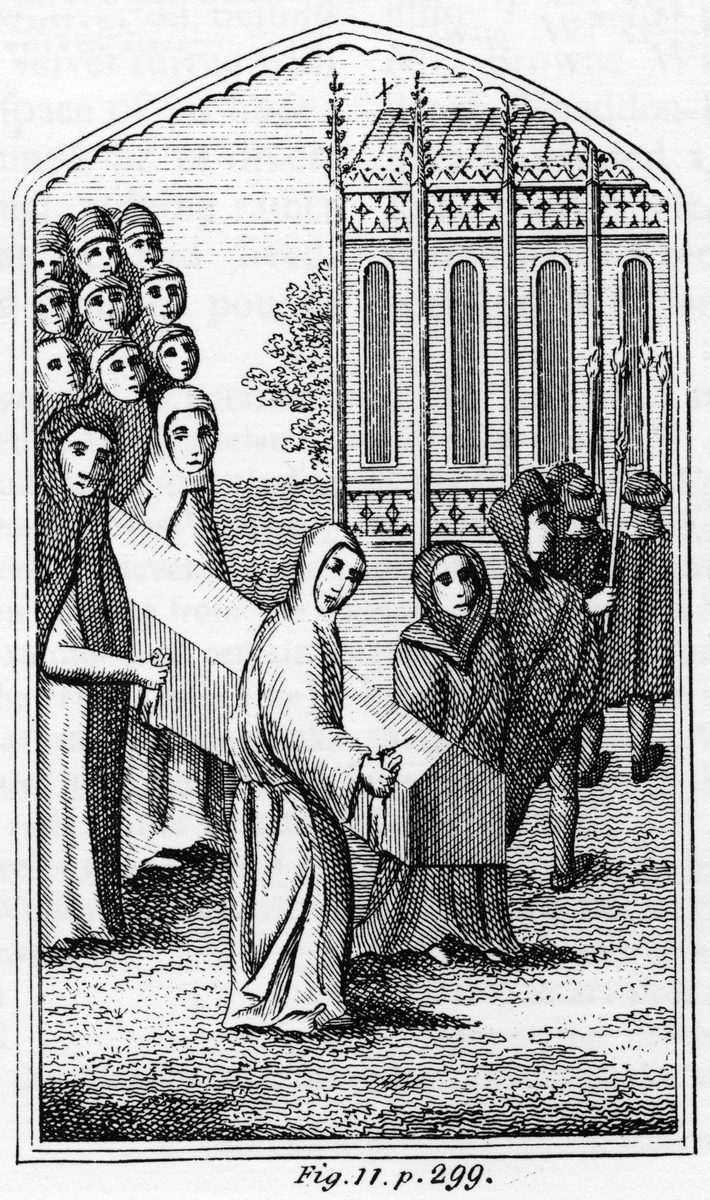
- An image of a medieval funeral procession in Leicester involving Friars from four different mendicant orders including the Austin Friars, as well as the Greyfriars, the Blackfriars, some Whitefriars (an order not present in Leicester), and a group of lay mourners. The church depicted is the now demolished St Sepulchre outside the southern wall of old Leicester (now Leicester Royal Infirmary).

- Location within Leicestershire

Monastery information
- Other name: St Katherine’s Priory
- Order: Order of Hermits of Saint Augustine
- Established: 1254
- Disestablished: November 10th, 1538
- Dedication: St Katherine
- Diocese: Lincoln

People
- Important associated figures: Thomas, 2nd Earl of Lancaster

Site
- Coordinates: 52.633362°N 1.144428°W
- Visible remains: None

Map of central Leicester showing the location of the Austin Friars (marked in green) among the key sites of Leicester Old Town. The Roman and medieval walls are marked by the dotted line. The churches are marked in red, the monasteries in black, secular buildings in blue, and the one surviving Roman ruin in purple.

Leicester Austin Friars or St. Katherine’s Priory, Leicester is a former Priory of Augustinian Hermit Friars in Leicester, England.

== History ==
Leicester Austin Priory was founded in 1254 and dedicated to St Katherine of Alexandria. It was enlarged in 1304 by Thomas, 2nd Earl of Lancaster.

In 1372 a general chapter of the Order of Austin Hermit Friars was held at the priory. Around the same time (the late 14th-century) the community was home to a Friar Hermit named Thomas Ratcliffe, who was regarded as a renowned preacher.

The priory was surrendered for dissolution on November 10, 1538. The priory does not appear to have been very large. At dissolution it was home to the Prior and three friars, and owned only the land it stood upon and a few small properties within the town. The annual income of the priory was listed as only £1.

The priory was unusual in having two cloisters.
