= Holy Cross Priory, Leicester =

Dominican priory in Leicester, England

Priory of the Holy Cross
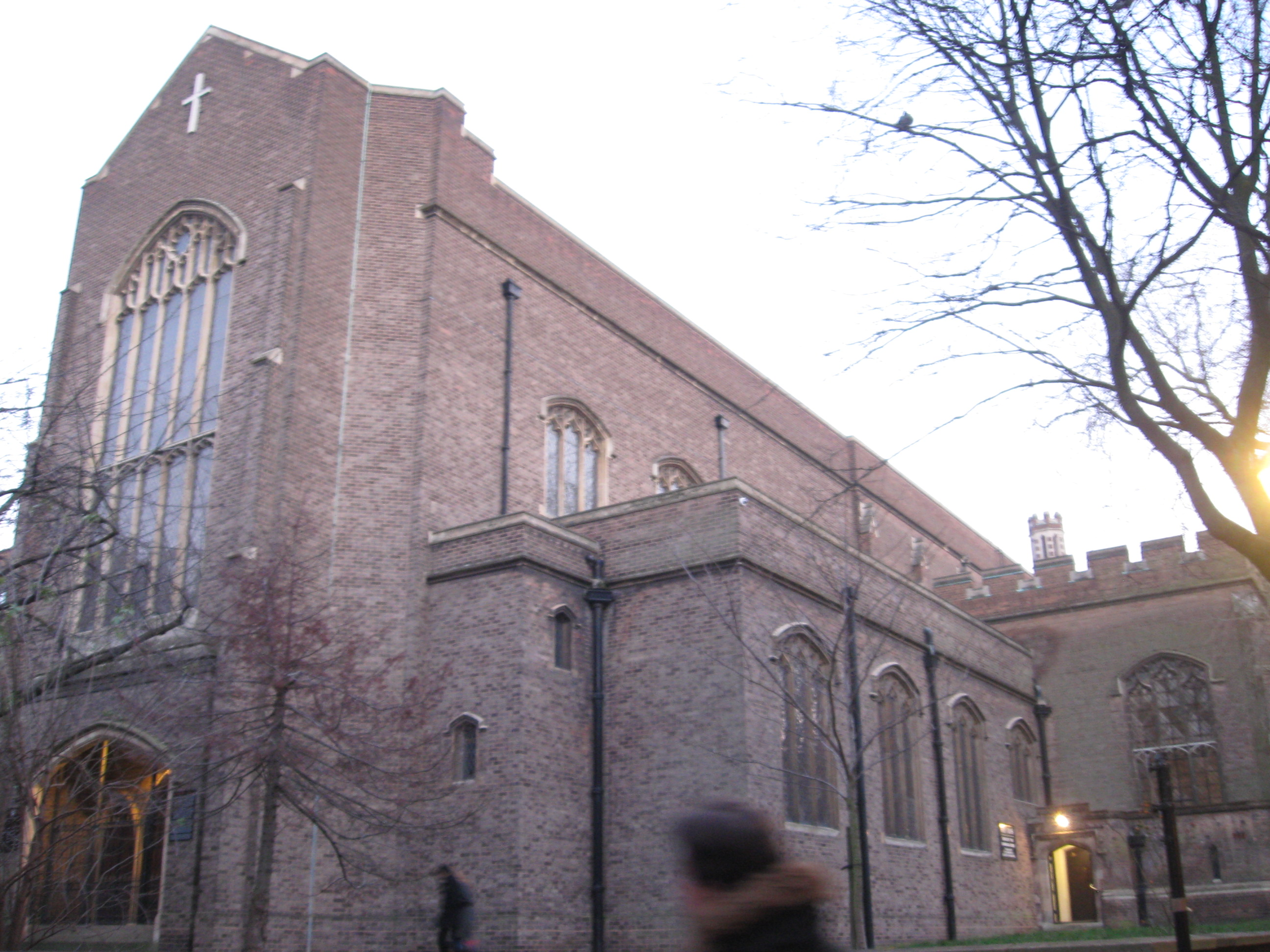
- Exterior of the Priory Church

- Location within Leicestershire

Monastery information
- Order: Dominican Order
- Established: 1882
- Dedication: The Holy Cross
- Diocese: Nottingham

People
- Prior: Fr Richard Ounsworth O.P.

Site
- Location: Leicester, England
- Coordinates: 52.630648°N 1.130251°W

Holy Cross Priory is a Roman Catholic parish church and priory of the Order of Preachers (also called Blackfriars or Dominican Friars) on New Walk, in Leicester, England.

== History ==
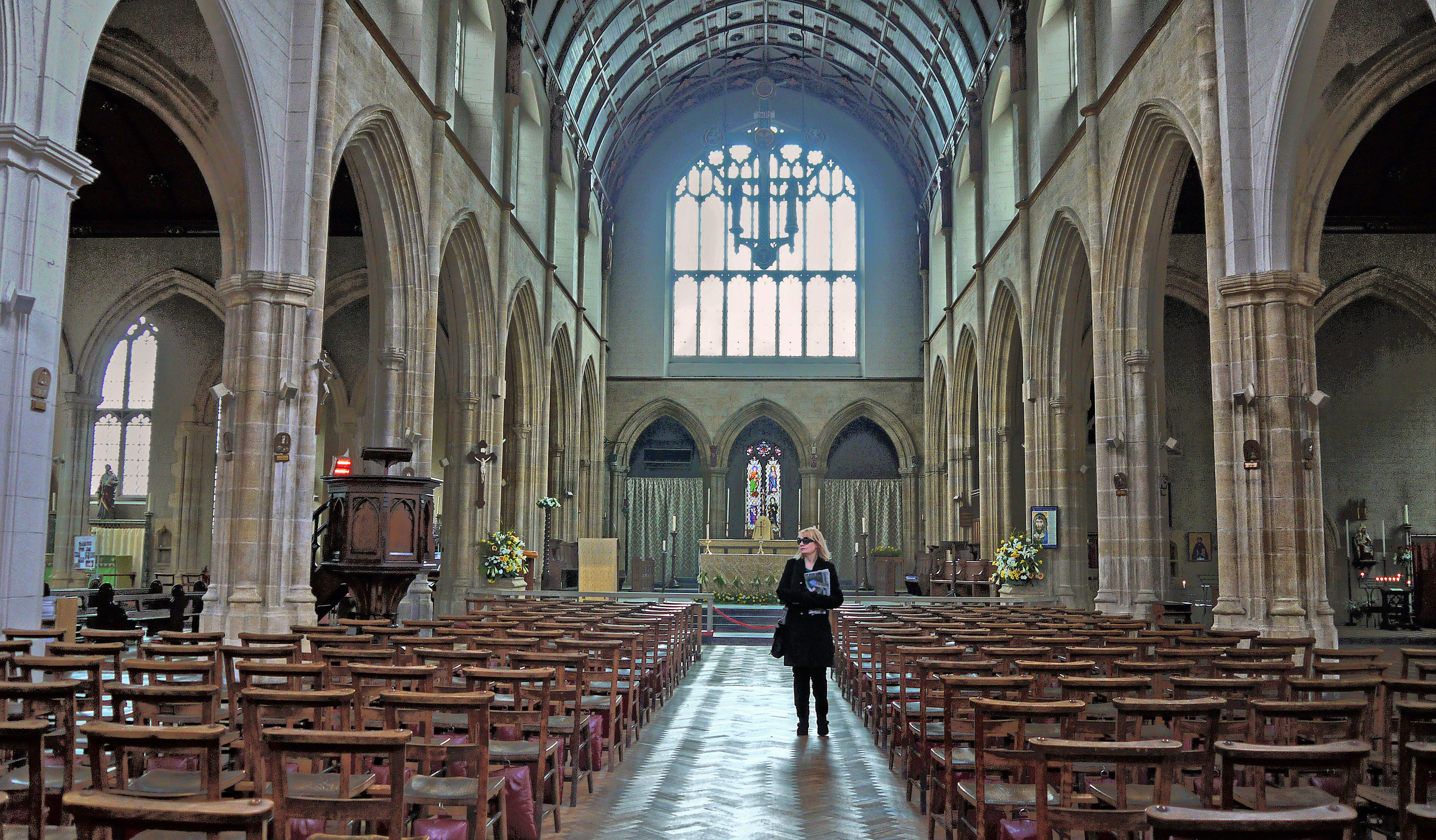
Interior

The Dominicans first came to Leicester in 1247 establishing a priory at St Clements Church in the north western corner of the old city walls (see Blackfriars, Leicester) sometime in the reign of Henry III. This house was dissolved by Henry VIII in 1538. The order was then absent from the city for more than 280 years.

The friars initially returned to Leicester in 1819 but the current priory was not established until 1882. By 1929, the church had proved too small and Friar Vincent McNabb O.P. began to raise money for a new church. The choir and transepts of the church was completed by 1931, and the High Altar was consecrated. The church was finally completed and formally consecrated in 1958.

The priory has had two church organs. The first were built by J Porritt & Son of Leicester in 1861. It was moved to the south side of the choir when the first part of the new church opened in 1931. The organ was, however, too small and difficult to play, and so a new organ was bought. The replacement came from St Mary's Church in Preston, Lancashire, and was built by William Ebenezer Richardson in 1880.

The friars preach in the village of Woodhouse, at the University of Leicester, De Montfort University and Leicester Royal Infirmary and teach at Blackfriars, Oxford.
