= Contemplata aliis tradere =

Contemplata aliis tradere is a Latin phrase which translates into English as "to hand down to others the fruits of contemplation." Derived from the Summa Theologiae of Saint Thomas Aquinas, OP, the phrase is often used to express the distinct Dominican theory of Christian vocation, and for that reason, it became a motto of the Dominican Order.

== Original text ==
In his Summa Theologiae, begun in 1265 (circa 50 years after Saint Dominic founded the Dominican Order), St. Thomas Aquinas wrote that "Vita contemplativa simpliciter est melior quam activa quae occupatur circa corporales actus, sed vita activa secundum quam aliquis praedicando et docendo contemplata aliis tradit, est perfectior quam vita quae solum contemplatur, quia talis vita praesupponit abundantiam contemplationis. Et ideo Christus talem vitam elegit" (Summa Theologiae, III, Q. 40, A. 1, Ad 2). A translation is: "the contemplative life is, absolutely speaking, more perfect than the active life, because the latter is taken up with bodily actions: yet that form of active life in which a man, by preaching and teaching, delivers to others the fruits of his contemplation, is more perfect than the life that stops at contemplation, because such a life is built on an abundance of contemplation, and consequently such was the life chosen by Christ." The literal expression comes from his treatment of the contemplative and active lives in the Second Part of the Summa Theologiae, where he states that, "just as it is better to enlighten than merely to shine, so is it better to give to others the fruits of one's contemplation (contemplata aliis tradere) than merely to contemplate (contemplari)." (Summa Theologiae, II-II Q. 188, A. 6)

== Dominican spirituality ==
The phrase came to express the essence of the vocation and spirituality of the Dominicans, and is a principal motto of the Order. Since the foundation of the Order in 1216 by Saint Dominic and under his direct inspiration, the Dominicans dedicated themselves to the meditation and study of Sacred Scripture while having the explicit objective of serving in apostolic ministry, which for them is the fruit of their contemplative life.
