= Charles J. Billson =

British writer and lawyer (1858–1932)

Charles James Billson (1858–1932) was an English translator, lawyer, and collector of folklore.

Billson was born in Leicester, graduated from Oxford University, and died in Heathfield in Sussex. He is buried in All Saints Church yard.

His works include a translation of Virgil's Aeneid, and a noted paper on the Easter Hare. He began a correspondence with Herman Melville, after requesting a reading list from the author, and introduced him to works by the then obscure poet James Thomson. Billson forwarded his correspondence to Melville's biographers.

Charles J. Billson was President (1893–94) of the Leicester Literary and Philosophical Society.

His publications included:-

- (1895) County Folk-Lore - Leicestershire and Rutland, London, Folk Lore Society
- (1920) Mediaeval Leicester, Edgar Backus, Leicester
- (1924) Leicester Memoirs, Edgar Backus, Leicester
