= New Walk, Leicester =

Promenade in Leicester, England

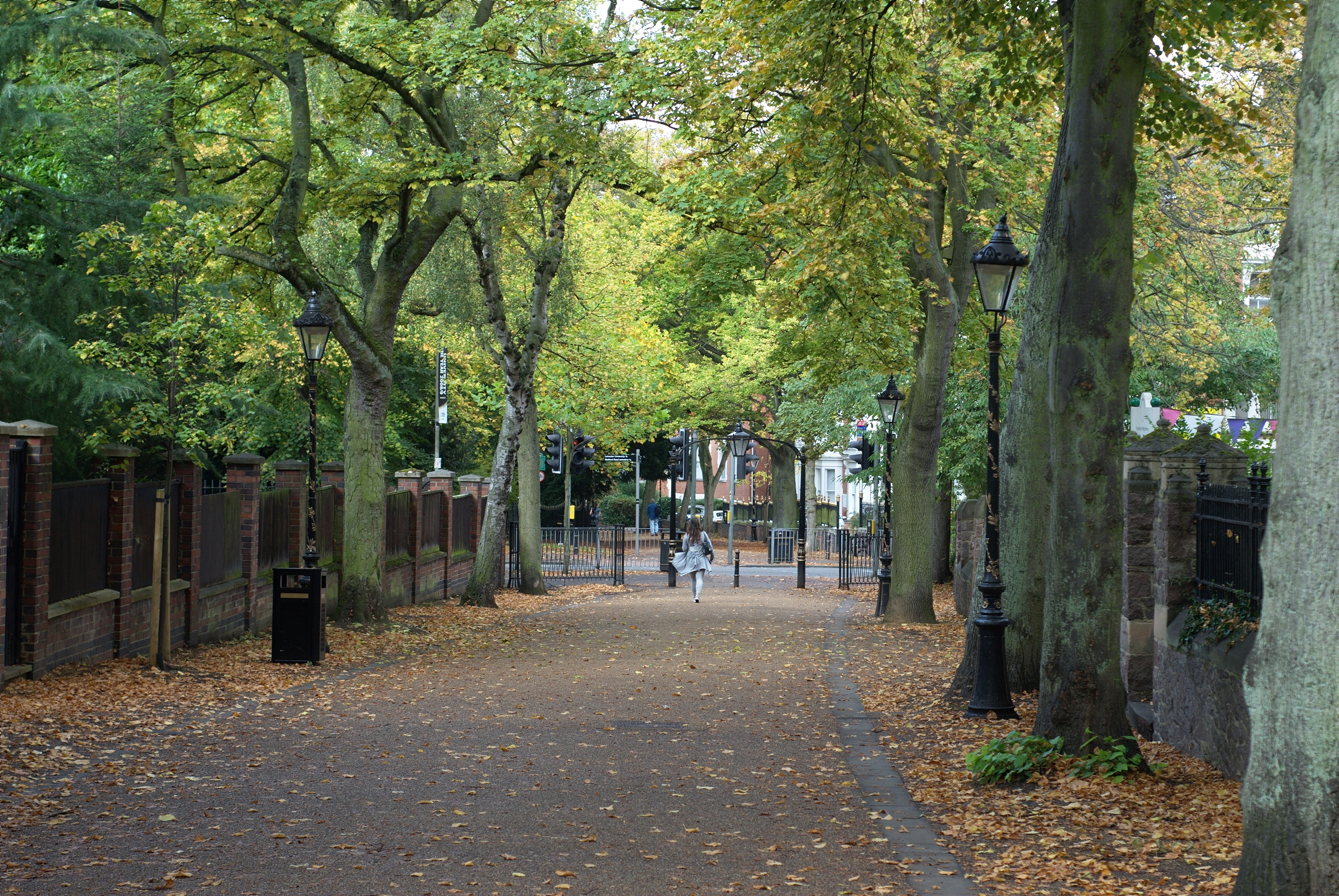
A view of a portion of New Walk

New Walk is a promenade in the city of Leicester which connects the areas around Victoria Park (including Stoneygate, Evington, and Clarendon Park) to the city centre. The promenade is a rare surviving example of a Georgian promenade. The walk is just under a mile long. There are many interesting buildings along its route, including Holy Cross Priory, Leicester Museum & Art Gallery, and towards its upper end, a notable group of houses by the architect Stockdale Harrison.

== History ==
In May 1785, the Corporation of Leicester launched a public subscription to defray the estimated cost of £240 to complete a public walk to St. Mary's Field (now Victoria Park), which at that time was a racecourse and general recreation ground. Work to stake out the route began immediately. It was to be 10 yards wide, more than a mile long and planted on each side with elms. It is believed that an ancient Roman trackway called the Via Devana predated the promenade and that this trackway formed the basis for the route. Although 'the new walk' immediately became popular, the trees that lined the walk were regularly attacked: trees were severely damaged in 1786 and 1787, in 1778 eighty young trees were destroyed, and 'a large number of trees' were destroyed in 1793. Despite offers of 20 guineas reward, the culprits were never found.

Although officially named Queen's Walk in honour of Queen Charlotte, it continued to be known locally as 'the new walk' – the name that was officially adopted later, at an unknown date.

Houses were built alongside New Walk for the first time in the 1820s. The houses were built at a distance, set by the corporation, of 'no less than 10 yards' from the path. New Walk was shortened slightly when Granville Road was built across its upper end.

From the first, New Walk was solely for the use of pedestrians; no carts or carriages were allowed. The route remains pedestrianised and is not open to vehicles of any kind. A number of controversies regarding the use of the promenade by cyclists have arisen in recent years.
