= Thurmaston Milestone =

The Thurmaston milestone is a complete surviving miliarium originally erected on the Fosse Way two miles north of Ratae Corieltauvorum (Roman Leicester), Thurmaston in Leicestershire, now kept at the Jewry Wall Museum. It has been described as:

"next to the Jewry Wall and it’s neighbouring mosaic pavements, the most important relic of the Roman period in Leicester.

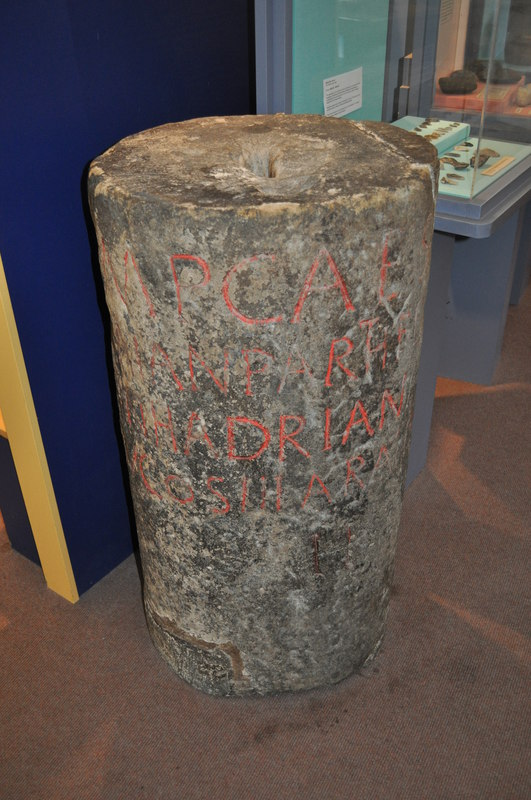
The Thurmaston Milestone in Jewry Wall Museum

Carved out of local limestone, it bears an inscription in honour of the Emperor Hadrian and was probably erected either in preparation for or in commemoration of his visit to Britain in 120 AD. In the Middle Ages it served as the parish boundary marker between Thurmaston and Belgrave. Rediscovered in 1771 it was erected in 1783 as part of an obelisk on Belgrave Gate in what is now Leicester City Centre where it became a noted monument of the east suburb of Leicester. It was later installed in New Walk Museum in 1844 and later in the Jewry Wall Museum.

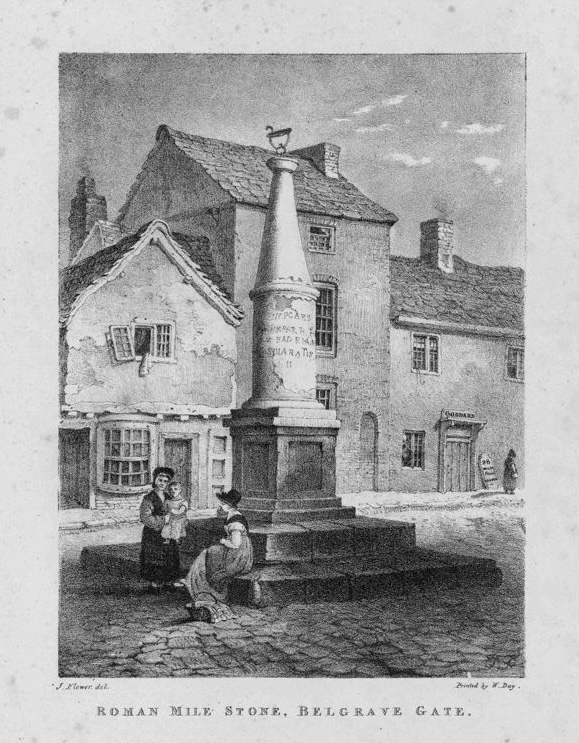
The Thurmaston Milestone on Belgrave Gate in 1826, an engraving from a painting by John Flower

The inscription reads as follows.

IMPERATOR CAESAR, DIVI TRAJANI PARTHICI FILIUS DIVUS, TRAJANUS HADRIANUS AUGUSTUS, POTESTATE IV. CONSULATU III. A RATIS II.

Which in English translates to:

Hadrian Trajan Augustus, Emperor and Caesar, the son of the most illustrious Trajan Parthicus, in the 4th year of his reign and his third consulate. From Ratae (Leicester) 2 miles.

== See also ==
- Jewry Wall
- Ratae Corieltauvorum
