= Leicester Vaughan College =

Higher education college in Leicester, England

Coordinates: 52.634944°N 1.141759°W

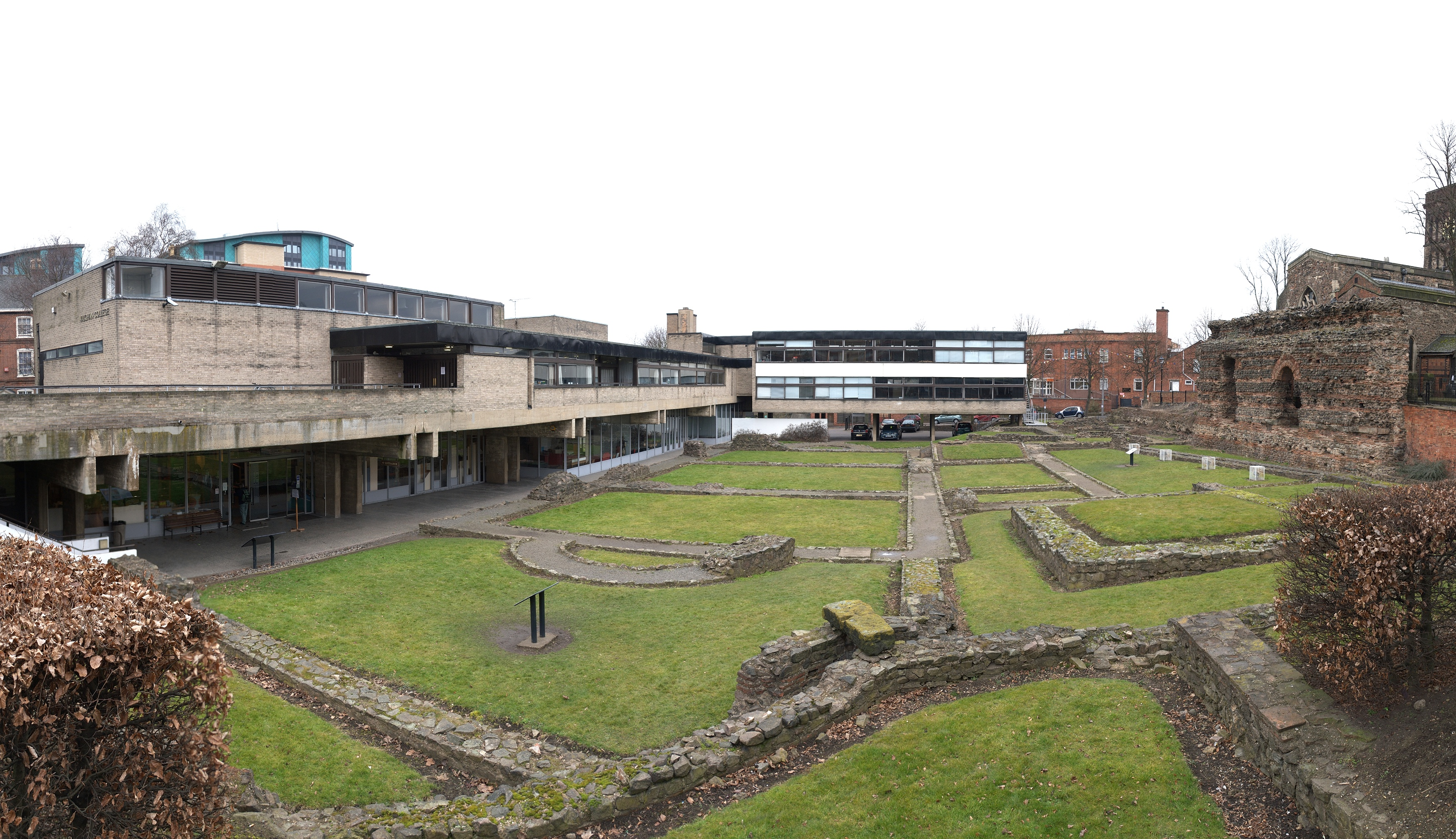
The former Vaughan College (left) looks out over the Roman bath-house foundations and Jewry Wall, Leicester

Leicester Vaughan College (LVC) is an independent higher education college in Leicester, England. It is the successor to Vaughan College, originally founded by Revd David Vaughan in 1862 to provide education for under-educated men. It rapidly became a facility for broader adult education and self-improvement for men and women of the town. After 45 years using two town centre schools, in 1908 it moved into its own premises on Great Central Street. Merging with University College, Leicester in 1929, it offered more undergraduate level adult education, including many part-time certificate courses and later a degree course. In 1962, with the demolition of its building, a new purpose-built college building was opened, integrated with Jewry Wall Museum and an archaeological site on St Nicholas Circle. In 2013 the university announced plans to close the city centre site, and move the teaching to its main campus, a move which lasted until 2016 when plans were announced for shutting the department altogether. In 2017 staff in the Vaughan Centre re-established the College as an independent co-operative community benefit society, renaming it Leicester Vaughan College.

== Beginnings ==
On 21 March 1862 a meeting was held at St Martin's Boys' School, Friar Lane, to discuss opening a reading room and library for men in the parish. A committee of management was formed, chaired by Revd David Vaughan with 6 further members. Even at this stage, there was a hope that a Working Men's College would result, to 'remedy the deficiencies of elementary education in adulthood' of the many framework knitters living and working in Leicester. From September 1862 it was called the 'Working Men's Institute, with Library, Reading Room and Classes'. Classes in a variety of subjects were offered, based in the St Martin's Infant School in Union Street. From the following year one-off lectures also featured, on such topics as 'America' and 'Co-operation'. As the popularity of lectures, musical evenings and social events grew, larger venues such as the Temperance Hall were regularly used. Other ways of improving the lot of working people were developed, including a Sick Benefit Society, and a Provident Society, to encourage regular saving, as well as a 'Samaritan Fund' for those too poor to pay the modest subscriptions.

Six years after its inception, the name was changed to "Working Men's College and Institute", to show its "humble, yet earnest, endeavour to improve the working classes of the town, intellectually and morally". From 1880 women aged 17 and upwards were also provided with classes, based in the Friar Lane school, and included reading, writing, arithmetic, spelling, needlework, cutting out, domestic economy, geography, English grammar and composition. Within four years the women had to move to the County School on Great Central Street, to provide more space. By 1912, fifty years after it was founded, the women outnumbered the men, with an enrolment of 1,189 compared to 899 men.

== The Vaughan Working Men's College ==
In 1905 David Vaughan died aged 80. Age and ill-health had required him to step back from the college, but for 43 years he had been central to its life and character. Also in 1905, St Martin's Churchwardens sold the Union Street school buildings, giving the college two years to find a new home. The Board of Education agreed to provide a new building on Great Central Street, and in tribute to the work of both David Vaughan and his wife, Margaret, it was named the Vaughan Working Men's College. In 1908 a branch of the Workers' Educational Association (WEA) was established in Leicester, and by 1914 the two organisations were in active partnership, which continued in various forms thereafter. An inspection report of 1917-18 found shortcomings, which arose from falling enrolment, due in some measure to the success of the day-schools over previous years. The solution, they suggested, was to focus on "higher education of the liberal humanistic type for working people in Leicester". In 1921 Leicester University College was founded, and from the outset the usefulness of Vaughan College as a "preparatory institution" was apparent. Plans to utilise the Great Central Street building as the headquarters of the University extramural department progressed. The need for grant-funded investment required the University to be the responsible body, and in 1929 Vaughan Working Men's College ceased to be an independent body, and was taken over by the University College, forming one part of the Department of Adult Education.

== University College ==
The transfer to a department of Leicester's fledgling University College brought a shift in activities, as well as the winding up of the former committee. The name "Vaughan College" indicated both a link with the past, and a move away from its working class focus. Much of the 'traditional' teaching was taken on by an Adult Evening Institute set up by Leicestershire Education Authority, which still used the Great Central Street premises, while the College focused on higher level courses. The founding of a Students' Union and the Vaughan Society in 1931 expanded the social and sporting activities along with lectures, discussions, music, drama and a cinema.

During and after World War II, demand for classes meant every available room was in use for teaching. The situation was eased in 1949 when the Evening Institute moved out to the "Pork Pie Chapel" on Belvoir Street. Prof. A. J. Allaway was appointed Head of Adult Education in 1945, tasked with moving the Vaughan College courses to university undergraduate level throughout. As part of this process, the WEA found that the expanded role they had taken on within Vaughan College during the 1940s was severely curtailed by the early 1950s. They continued to offer WEA courses within the College, but were limited to two classrooms per evening, and to classes with a "clear social reference", while the College would expand their Extramural Certificate courses and professional refresher courses.

== Jewry Wall site ==
In 1954 the administration of the University's Department of Adult Education was moved from Vaughan College to the main University building. The post of Warden of Vaughan College was created to provide oversight of Vaughan College itself. P.A.W. Collins was the first holder of the post which was phased out 54 years later in an administrative re-organisation of 2008. In 1957 the University was granted its own charter. Also in the mid-1950s a major road scheme, which was to become "Vaughan Way" required the demolition of the Vaughan College building. The question of where to move to was in large measure answered by Alderman Charles Keene, a University Pro-Vice Chancellor who was also on the City Council's Town Planning and Museums committees. He suggested a new building close to the old Great Central Street site, which could incorporate both the college and a new museum, alongside the Roman archaeological site at Jewry Wall. Designed by Trevor Dannatt, work began in 1959 and was completed in 1962. The lower floor, housing the Jewry Wall Museum, with Roman mosaics and other artifacts from Roman Leicester along with Iron Age and post-Roman displays, is at the same level as the Roman bath-house foundations, well below street level. Vaughan College occupied the upper floor of the long L-shaped building of cream-coloured brick and concrete, with impressive views of the Jewry Wall Roman remains and St Nicholas Church. 100 years after its foundation, the college had a modern, purpose built building, and a staff team providing full-time, day release and part-time courses.

Also in 1962, Denis Rice became Warden, and would remain so for the next 22 years. An innovation from 1964 was the use of the common area for art exhibitions. Local artists could exhibit for free, in return for donating a picture, selected by the Warden, which joined an expanding Vaughan College permanent collection. By 1984 some 200 art works had been acquired in this way. In 1968 Prof. H. A. Jones succeeded Prof. Allaway, and in 1970 a widened subject range with a strong arts emphasis, plus social sciences, religion, local studies and geology. 91 different tutors were used that year, drawn from 24 different university departments.

== Lifelong Learning ==
By the 1980s Vaughan College was, like many adult education institutions, having difficulties with funding and recruitment. The introduction in 1989 of a BA in Humanities provided he opportunity for part-time students, primarily being taught at evening classes, to obtain a University of Leicester degree. Instigated by Dr Robert Colls of the University's Department of Adult Education, it remains the only "purpose-built" part-time degree course at the University. The 1990s saw more students (5,000 were enrolled during 1989-90) but difficulties of integrating with both the Department of Adult Education and the wider University meant on-going restructuring, and in 2000 the Department was replaced by the Leicester Institute of Lifelong Learning (LILL). Closer integration with the main university facilities was one of the outcomes of this change. The Vaughan College library received a £75,000 grant from the Higher Education Funding Council for England to update its facilities and stock, and integrate it with the university library systems.

In September 2012 the university held an event to celebrate 150 years of Vaughan College. This included the launch of Cynthia Brown's book, A Blessing to the Town: 150 years of Vaughan College, Leicester, and a talk by Professor Rob Colls on Why is Vaughan College Important?, featuring ex-students describing the positive impact it had on their lives.

In June 2013 the University of Leicester announced that it had decided to close the city centre building, and move the adult education teaching to the main University site, alongside all the other university teaching. In June 2016 the University announced that the Vaughan Centre for Lifelong Learning was being considered for closure, with no new adult education recruitment for its courses.

The former Vaughan College building was sold to Leicester City Council by 2016, and plans were announced in March 2016 to expand the Jewry Wall Museum to include the upper floors, improve the access arrangements, expand the displays on Roman Leicester, and carry out additional archaeological works on the Roman remains themselves.

== Leicester Vaughan College ==
Leicester Vaughan College (LVC) is an independent higher education college set up as a co-operative community benefit society to continue the work of the former Vaughan College. It aims to provide university-level education dedicated to the needs of part-time learners and to those wanting a "second chance" to study. It currently has a non-accredited programme of courses, an Open Research Forum, and is working towards offering fully accredited degrees in various forms of counselling and in arts, humanities and social sciences. The new Vaughan College operates out of Leicester Adult Education College on Belvoir Street and is registered with the FCA as Community Benefit Society No. 7622.
