= Belvoir Street Chapel =

Hansom Hall
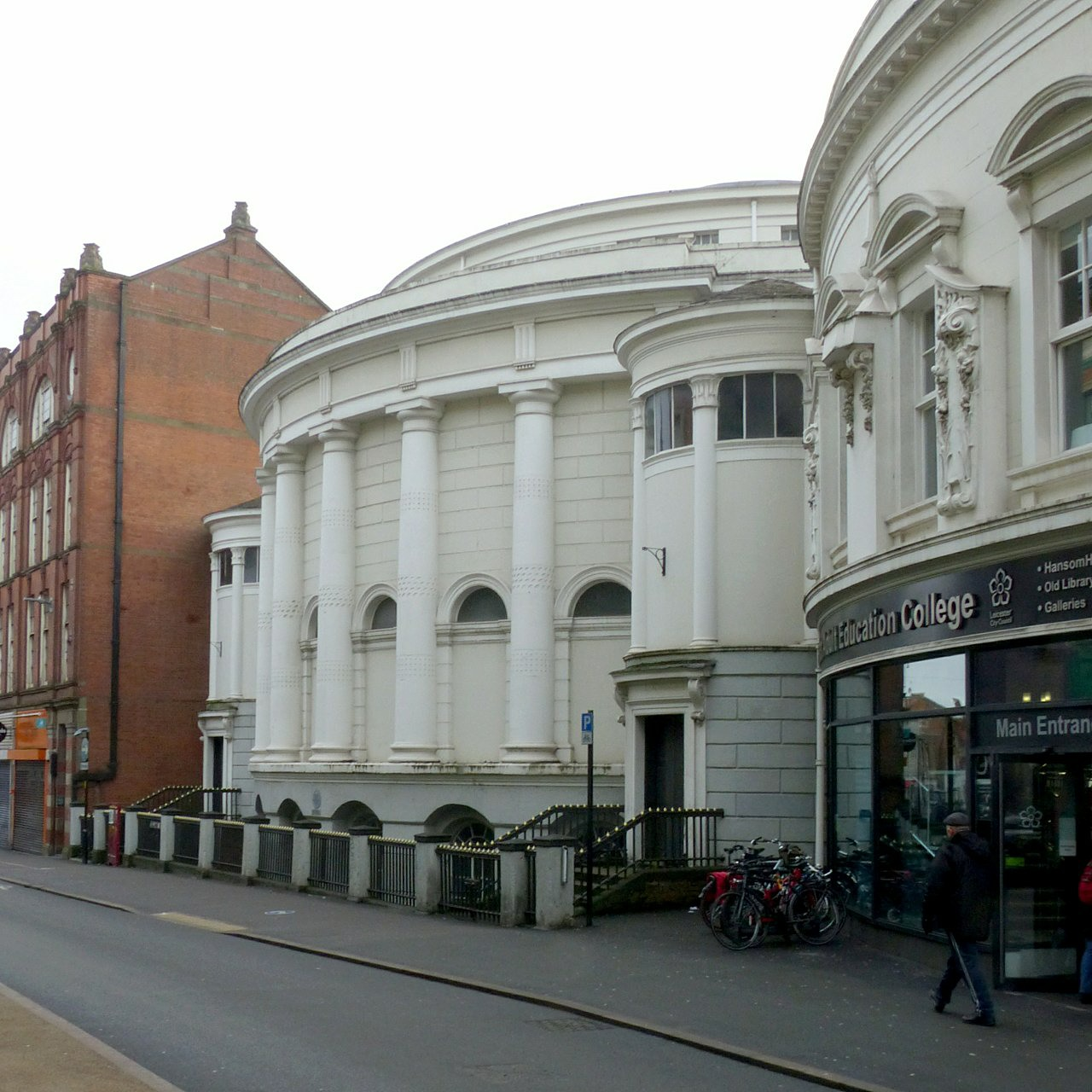
- Hansom Hall
- 52°37′56″N 1°07′56″W@
- Location: Leicester, England, UK

History
- Former name: Belvoir Street Chapel
- Status: adaptive reuse

Architecture
- Heritage designation: Grade II listed
- Designated: 5 January 1950
- Architect: Joseph Hansom
- Completed: 1845

The Belvoir Street Chapel, also known as the Pork Pie Chapel, and renamed Hansom Hall, was a Baptist church in Leicester, England.

Leicester in the 19th century was known as the ‘Metropolis of Dissent’ with a large number of non-conformist chapels and churches. There have been numerous places of worship of various denominations, including the Baptists. Numerous chapels were built from the 17th century, many in the 19th century.

The chapel on Belvoir Street in Leicester City Centre was designed by Joseph Hansom and built in 1845. It was sometimes called the 'Pork Pie Chapel' on account of its resemblance to a pork pie. It became a Grade II listed building (1361372) on 5 January 1950. The building was sold in 1947 after the congregation had united with that of the Charles Street Chapel. Renamed for its architect, it is used for adult education as part of the Leicester Vaughan College.

== See also ==
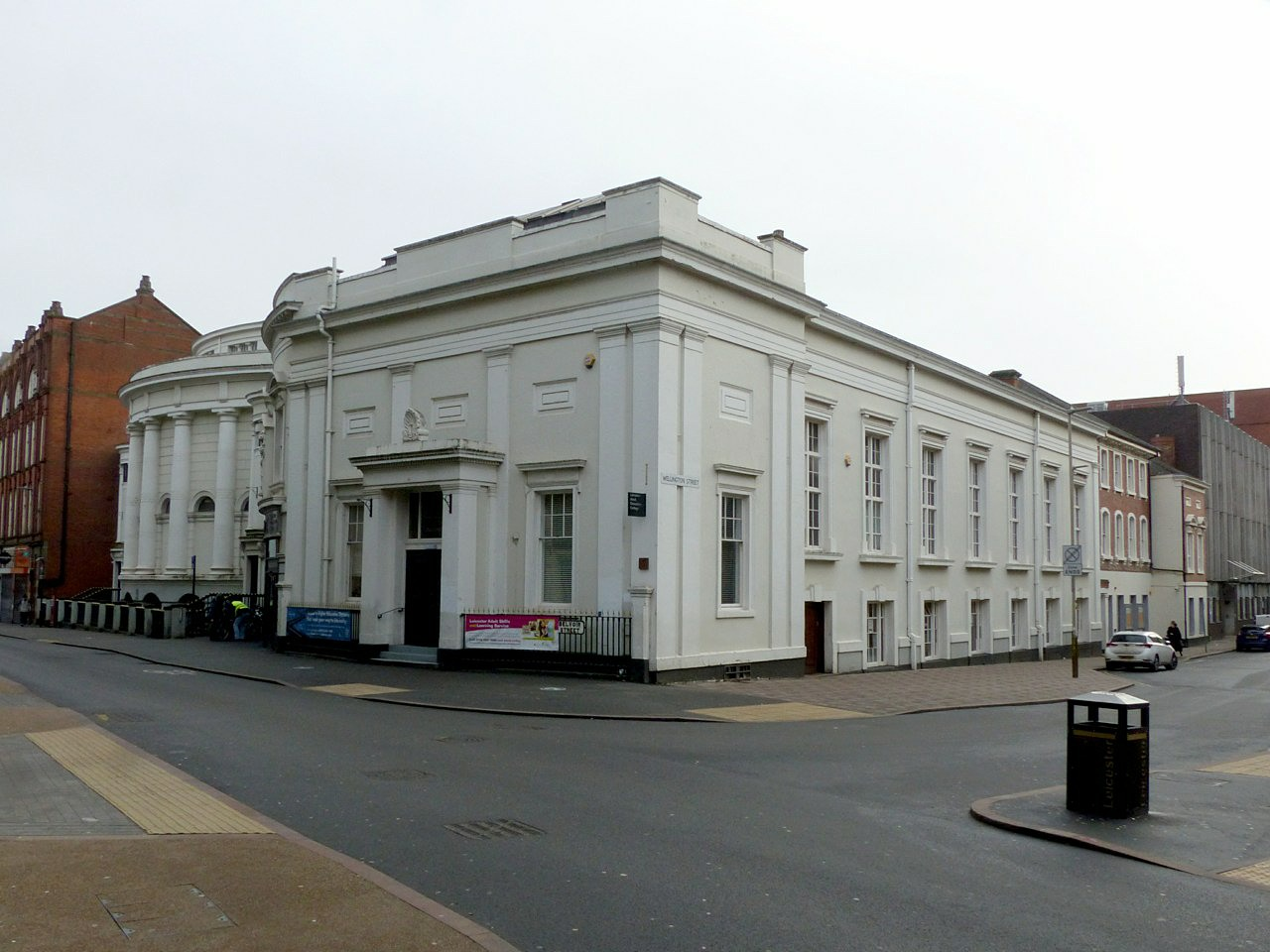
Hansom Hall and former library are part of college

- List of Baptist churches in England
