= Central Baptist Church, Leicester =

Central Baptist Church
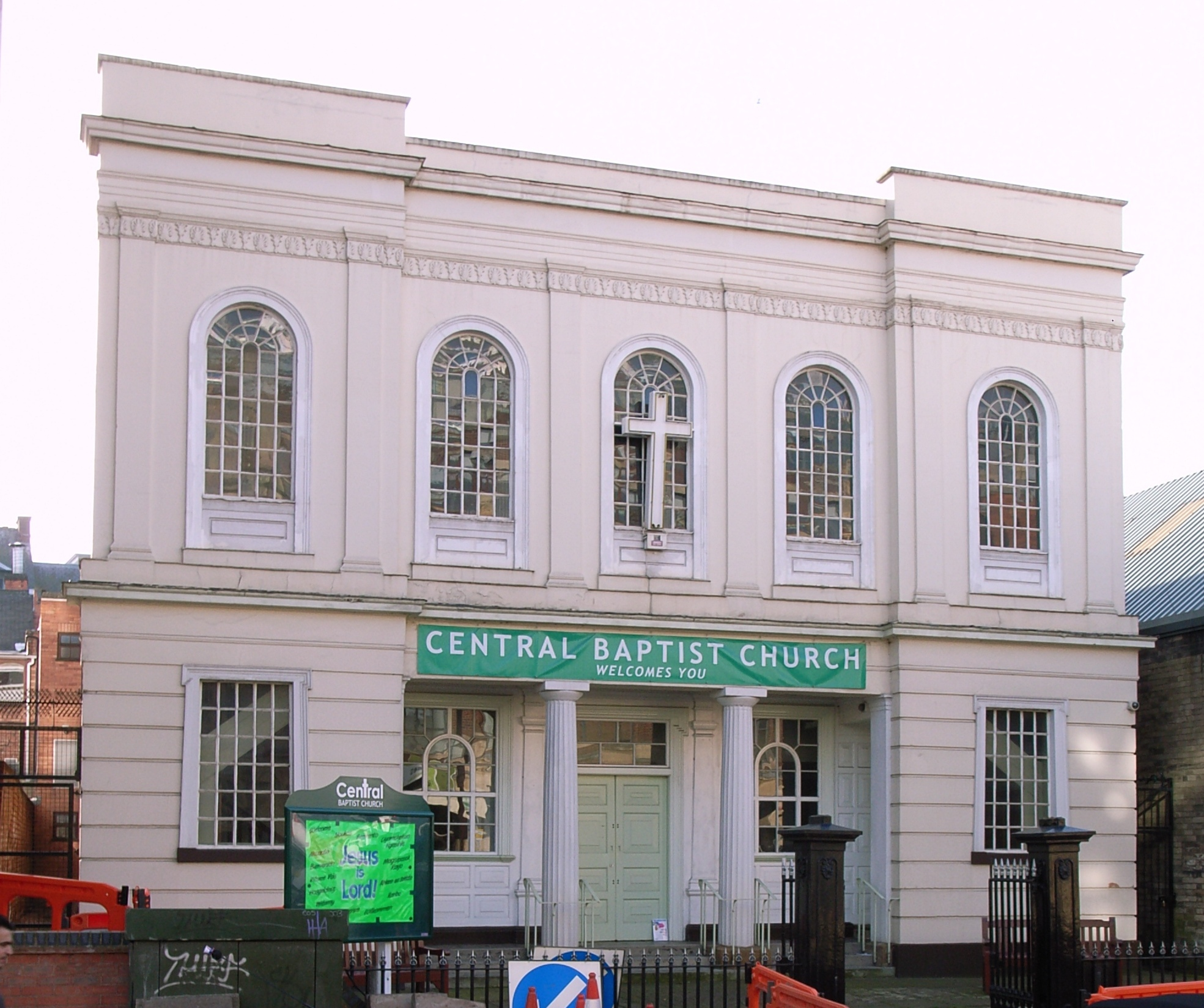
- Central Baptist Church
- 52.633482°N 1.128474°W
- Location: Leicester, England, UK
- Denomination: Baptist
- Website: www.cbleicester.org.uk

History
- Status: open

Architecture
- Heritage designation: Grade II listed
- Designated: 1973
- Architect: William Flynt
- Completed: 1832

The Central Baptist Church, also known as the Charles Street Baptist Chapel, is a Baptist church on Charles Street in Leicester, Leicestershire, England, UK. It is affiliated with the Baptist Union of Great Britain.

Leicester in the 19th century was known as the ‘Metropolis of Dissent’ with a large number of non-conformist chapels and churches. There have been numerous places of worship of various denominations, including the Baptists. Numerous chapels were built since the 17th century, many in the 19th century.

The Charles Street Baptist Chapel was designed by William Flynt, a leading local architect, and constructed in 1830. The congregation of the Belvoir Street Chapel united with that of Charles Street in the 1940s and became known as the United Baptist Church. It was designated a Grade II listed building (1074071) in 1973. It was named the Central Baptist Church in 1983 and is the last surviving of several Baptist churches in Leicester City Centre.

The building also houses the William Carey Museum, dedicated to William Carey, who was instrumental in the formation of the Baptist Missionary Society.

== See also ==
- List of Baptist churches in England
