= David James Vaughan =

English cleric and social reformer

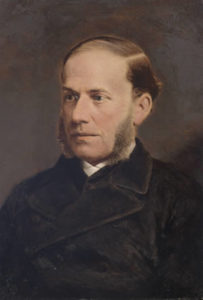
- Born: 2 August 1825; Leicester
- Died: 30 July 1905 (aged 79); Leicester
- Occupations: Cleric and social reformer

David James Vaughan (2 August 1825 – 30 July 1905) was an English cleric and social reformer.

== Biography ==
Vaughan was an honorary canon of Peterborough, and social reformer. He was born at St. Martin's vicarage, Leicester, on 2 August 1825, was sixth and youngest son of Edward Thomas Vaughan, fellow of Trinity College, Cambridge, and vicar of St. Martin's, Leicester, by his second wife Agnes, daughter of John Pares of The Newarke, Leicester. Charles John Vaughan, master of the Temple, and General Sir John Luther Vaughan, G.C.B., were elder brothers. James Vaughan, a physician of Leicester and one of the founders of the Leicester Infirmary, was his grandfather, and his uncles included Sir Henry (who took the name of Halford), physician; Sir John Vaughan, baron of the exchequer and father of Henry Halford Vaughan; and Sir Charles Richard Vaughan, diplomatist.

David James was educated first at the Leicester Collegiate School, under William Hepworth Thompson, afterwards Master of Trinity College, Cambridge, and in August 1840 he went to Rugby, first under Arnold and then under Tait. In 1844 he won a scholarship at Trinity College, Cambridge, and next year the Bell university scholarship, along with John Llewelyn Davies. In 1847 he was Browne medallist for Latin ode and epigrams; and in 1847 and 1848 he obtained the members' prize for a Latin essay. In 1848 he was bracketed fifth classic with his friend Llewelyn Davies, and he was twenty-fourth senior optime. He graduated B.A. in 1848, proceeded M.A. in 1851, and was a fellow of Trinity College from 1850 to 1858.

Vaughan, Davies, and Brooke Foss Westcott, all fellows of Trinity, formed at Cambridge a lifelong friendship. The three were amongst the earliest members of the Cambridge Philological Society. In 1852 Vaughan and Llewelyn Davies brought out together a translation of Plato's 'Republic,' with introduction, analysis, and notes. Davies undertook the first five books, and Vaughan the last five, each author submitting to the other his work for correction or amendment. The analysis was the work of Vaughan, whilst Davies was responsible for the introduction. In 1858 a second edition was issued, and in 1860 a new edition, without the introduction, in the 'Golden Treasury' series. This was stereotyped, and has since been frequently reprinted. An edition de luxe in two quarto volumes appeared in 1898. The translators sold their copyright for 60l. (information from J. L. Davies). The translation is exact and scholarly. Despite the superiority of Jowett's translation in respect alike of English style and of the presentation of Plato's general conceptions, Davies and Vaughan's rendering excels Jowett's in philological insight, and indicates with far greater fidelity the construction of difficult passages.

In 1853 Vaughan was ordained deacon, and began his pastoral work in Leicester, living on his fellowship, and serving as honorary curate, first to his eldest brother at St. Martin's, and then at St. John's church. In 1854 he was ordained priest, and in 1856 he succeeded his friend Llewelyn Davies as incumbent of St. Mark's, Whitechapel. In 1860 he was appointed vicar of St. Martin's, Leicester, and master of Wyggeston's Hospital. The living was then in the gift of the crown, and had been held by his father and two of his brothers continuously since 1802, save for a short interval of twelve years. In the case of each of the three sons the appointment was made at the urgent request of the parishioners. Vaughan refused all subsequent offers of preferment, including a residentiary canonry at Peterborough and the lucrative living of Battersea, which Earl Spencer offered him in 1872. He accepted an honorary canonry of Peterborough in 1872, and he was rural dean of Leicester from 1875 to 1884 and from 1888 to 1891. In June 1894 he was made hon. D.D. of Durham University.

In early life Vaughan was influenced by the liberal theology of John Macleod Campbell, and while in London he, like his friend Llewelyn Davies, came under the influence of Frederick Denison Maurice. Maurice's example as social and educational reformer largely moulded his career. His teaching on the atonement and inspiration was at the outset called in question, but Vaughan soon concentrated his interests in social questions, to which he brought a broad public spirit and sympathy. His efforts to elevate the working classes by means of education were no less earnest and successful than those of Maurice and his colleagues in London. In 1862 he started in Leicester, on the lines of the Working Men's College founded by Maurice in London in 1854, a working men's reading-room and institute in one of the parish schools. He arranged for classes and lectures, and the numbers attending them grew steadily, the teachers being all volunteers. In 1868 there were four hundred adults under instruction, and the name of the institute was changed to 'college' as being in Vaughan's words 'not only a school of sound learning, but also a home for Christian intercourse and brotherly love.' At one time the Leicester Working Men's College was educating 2300 students. In addition to Sunday morning and evening classes, night classes, and advanced classes, there were established a provident society, sick benefit society, and book club. Some of the students became leading manufacturers in Leicester, and several have filled the office of mayor.

On Sunday afternoons, Vaughan gave in St. Martin's church addresses on social and industrial as well as religious themes to working men, including members of the great friendly societies in Leicester, and students of the college. The first was delivered on 13 February 1870, on 'The Christian Aspect and Use of Politics.' Some of his Sunday afternoon addresses were published in 1894 as 'Questions of the Day.'

Vaughan was chairman of the first Leicester school board in 1871, and exercised a moderating influence over stormy deliberations. During an epidemic of small-pox in 1871, he constantly visited the patients in the improvised hospital, and from that time to near the end of his life he regularly ministered to the staff and patients of the borough isolation hospital. In 1893 failing health compelled him to resign his parish, and he retired to the Wyggeston Hospital on the outskirts of the town. He continued to act as chairman of the Institution of District Nurses, president of the Working Men's College, and honorary chaplain to the isolation hospital. He died at the master's house at Wyggeston's Hospital on 30 July 1905, and was buried at the Welford Road cemetery, Leicester. He married, on 11 January 1859, Margaret, daughter of John Greg of Escowbeck, Lancaster; she died on 21 February 1911 and was buried beside her husband.

To commemorate Vaughan's work at St. Martin's, as well as that of his father and two brothers, all former vicars, a new south porch was erected at St. Martin's church in 1896–7 at the cost of 3000l. After his death, a new Vaughan Working Men's College, situate in Great Central Street and Holy Bones, Leicester, was erected as a memorial to him at the cost of 8000l. The building was formally opened by Sir Oliver Lodge on 12 Oct. 1908.

Besides the works already mentioned, Vaughan published:

- 'Sermons preached in St. John's Church, Leicester,' 1856.
- 'Three Sermons on the Atonement,' 1859.
- 'Christian Evidences and the Bible,' 1864; 2nd edit. 1865.
- 'Thoughts on the Irish Church Question,' 1868.
- 'Sermons on the Resurrection,' 1869.
- 'The Present Trial of Faith,' 1878.
