= Jewry Wall Museum =

Museum in Leicester, England

Coordinates: 52.634944°N 1.141759°W

The Jewry Wall Museum is a museum in Leicester in the East Midlands of England. It was built in the 1960s, facing the Jewry Wall ruins in a building formerly shared with Vaughan College. It houses artefacts from Iron Age, Roman, and medieval Leicester, notably the Cyparissus Pavement, the Blackfriars Pavement, the Norfolk Street Wall Paintings, and the Thurmaston Milestone. With the ending of Vaughan College's use of the building in 2013, the whole site was acquired by the city council, and expansion and improvement plans were put in place. The museum re-opened in July 2025.

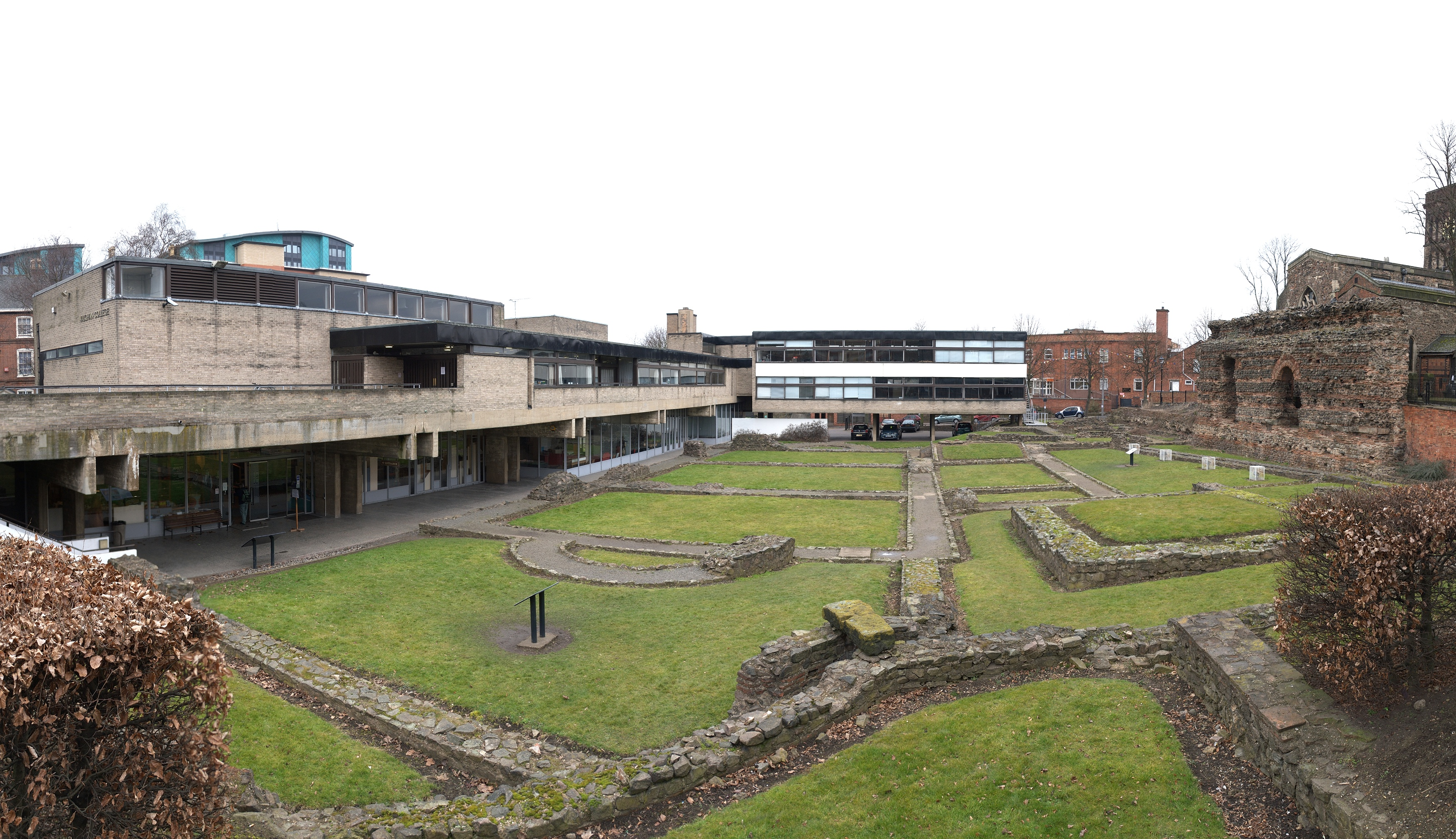
View of the Jewry Wall site showing the Jewry Wall Museum on the left

== Jewry Wall site ==
The area west of the Jewry Wall was excavated by Kathleen Kenyon between 1936 and 1939, resulting in a set of bath house foundations a considerable depth below street level. When post-war reconstruction got underway, what became Vaughan Way required the destruction of the old Vaughan Working Men's College, and the outcome was that the area alongside the Roman foundations was used for a new building which combined both the Adult learning college and a new museum to house Leicester's growing collection of Roman and medieval archaeological finds.

== The building ==
The building, completed in 1962 (64 years ago), is Grade II listed and until 2013 the museum was located below Vaughan College, part of Leicester University's Institute for Lifelong-Learning. Construction began in 1960 and finished two years later; the building was designed by Trevor Dannatt.

== The museum ==
The museum is run by Leicester City Council.

In 2004, as part of a scheme of cost-cutting on the part of Leicester City Council, it was proposed that the opening hours at the Jewry Wall Museum would be reduced. An interest group was created in response, and the Friends of Jewry Wall Museum have been actively promoting the museum since. Regardless of this, Leicester City Council reduced the museum's opening times to save money. Councillor John Mugglestone rationalised the decision at the time, saying: "At Jewry Wall, we have more curators than visitors".

The museum was threatened again in 2011, when Leicester City Council announced plans to close the museum (along with two others in the city) to save money. This decision was overturned following a motion by the City Council's backbench Labour Councillors, led by former Labour Council leader Ross Willmott.

The University of Leicester had been the owner of the building, with the museum holding a secure long-term tenancy of the ground floor, In 2013 the University announced that it was no longer to use the building for its lifelong learning activities and put it up for sale.

In March 2016 Leicester City Council was able to buy the building, and began a process of improvements and expansion of the Museum, which could be spread over both floors and improve access and visibility of both the museum and Roman ruins.

London-based architects, Levitate, designed and implemented a series of interventions to expand the museum, acting as lead design and conservation architect, obtaining planning, Scheduled Ancient Monument and Listed Building Consents for the works. This included a new accessible walkway situated within the Scheduled Ancient Monument creating level access to the museum and old college sections, and undertook internal adaptations to introduce a new circular visitor route. Work also included sensitive conservation works to the buildings listed fabric to preserve its special significance and ensure its retention.

The museum closed to the public in 2017, and in 2021, work began on major renovations and improvements to the museum. The Covid-19 pandemic and problems with the building caused repeated delays.

The museum reopened in July 2025, with a refreshed design, multimedia exhibitions, and fully immersive experiences. The quantity of Roman material has expanded greatly in recent years as developers have been required to carry out full archaeological works while redeveloping sites across the city. The conservation and refurbishment works are noted as a case study in sensitive adaptation of post-war public architecture and been acknowledged for its valuable regeneration, winning Procon’s large non-residential award 2025, being finalist for Procon’s regeneration award 2025, and shortlisted for CN Awards Project of the Year under £20m 2026 and RICS East Midlands Heritage Award 2026.

== Notable holdings ==
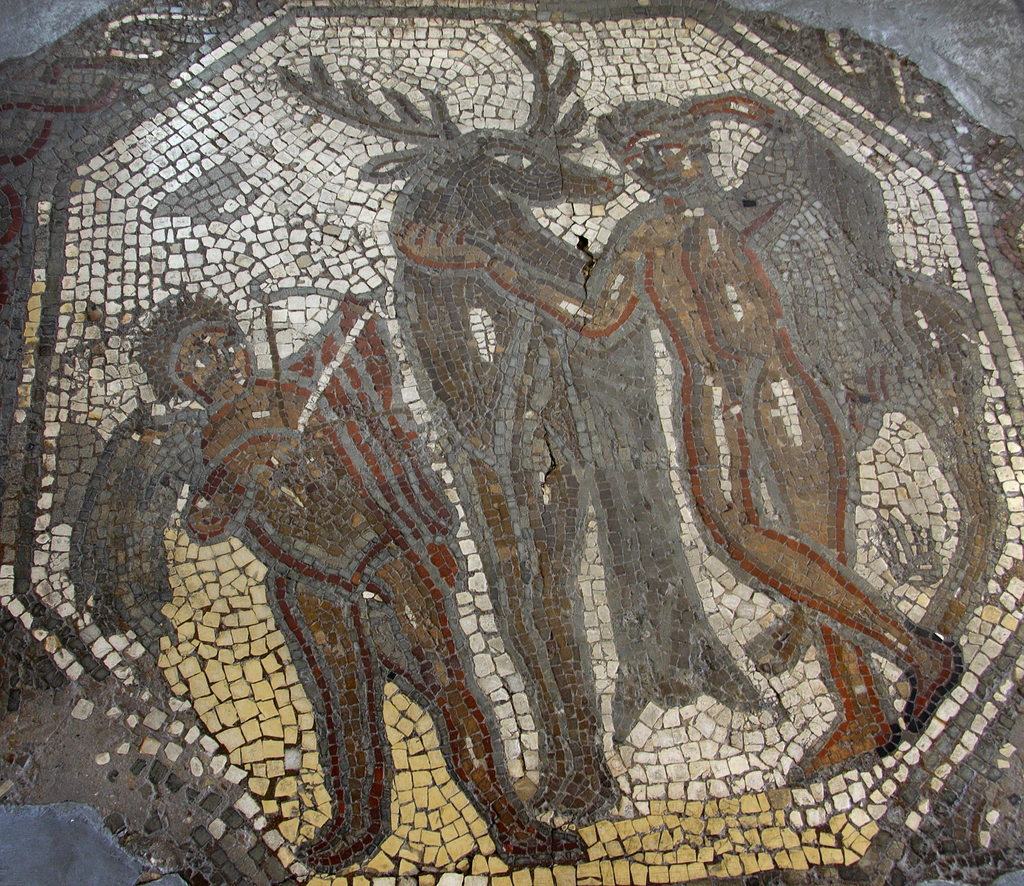
Mosaic of Cyparissus

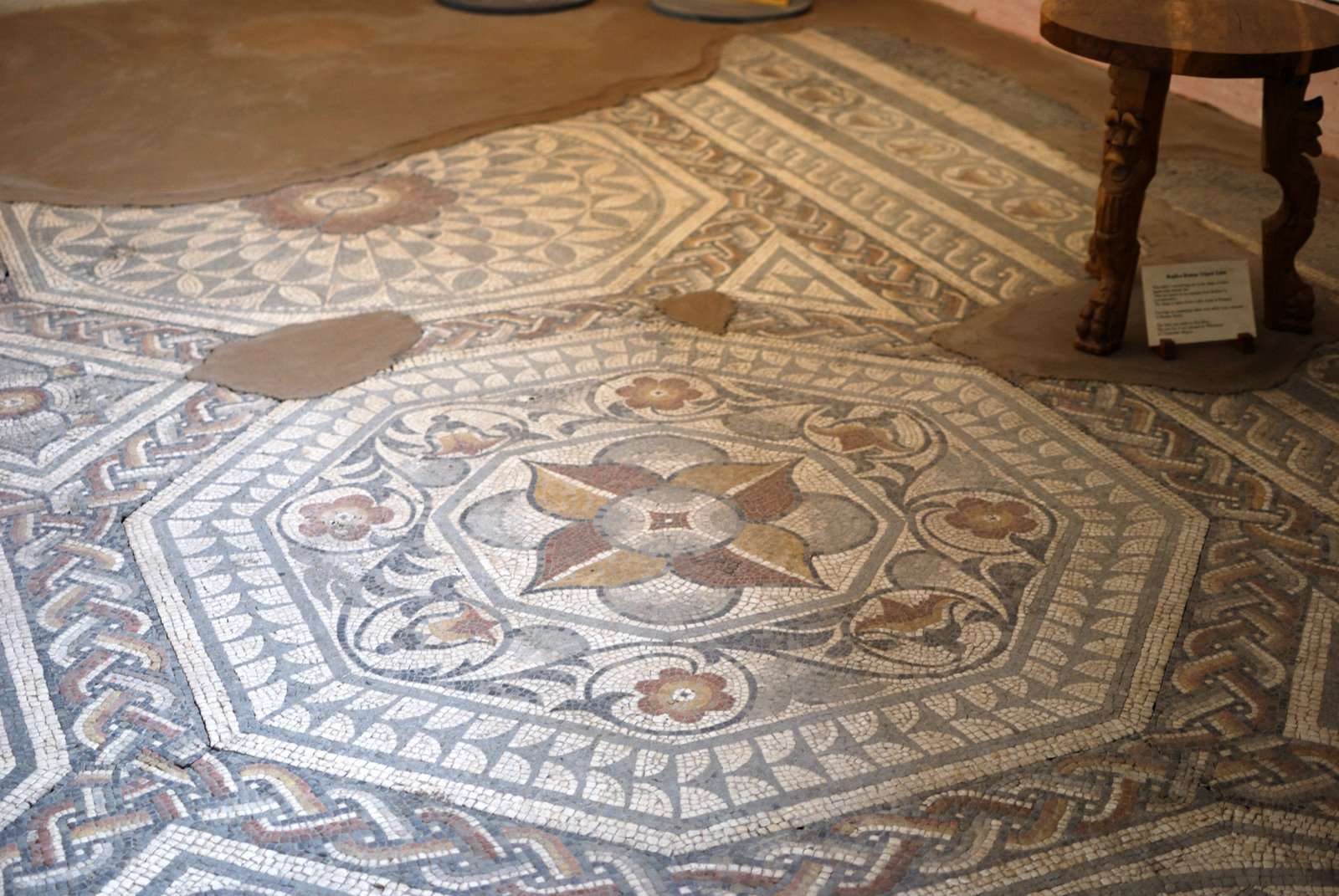
The Blackfriars Roman Pavement

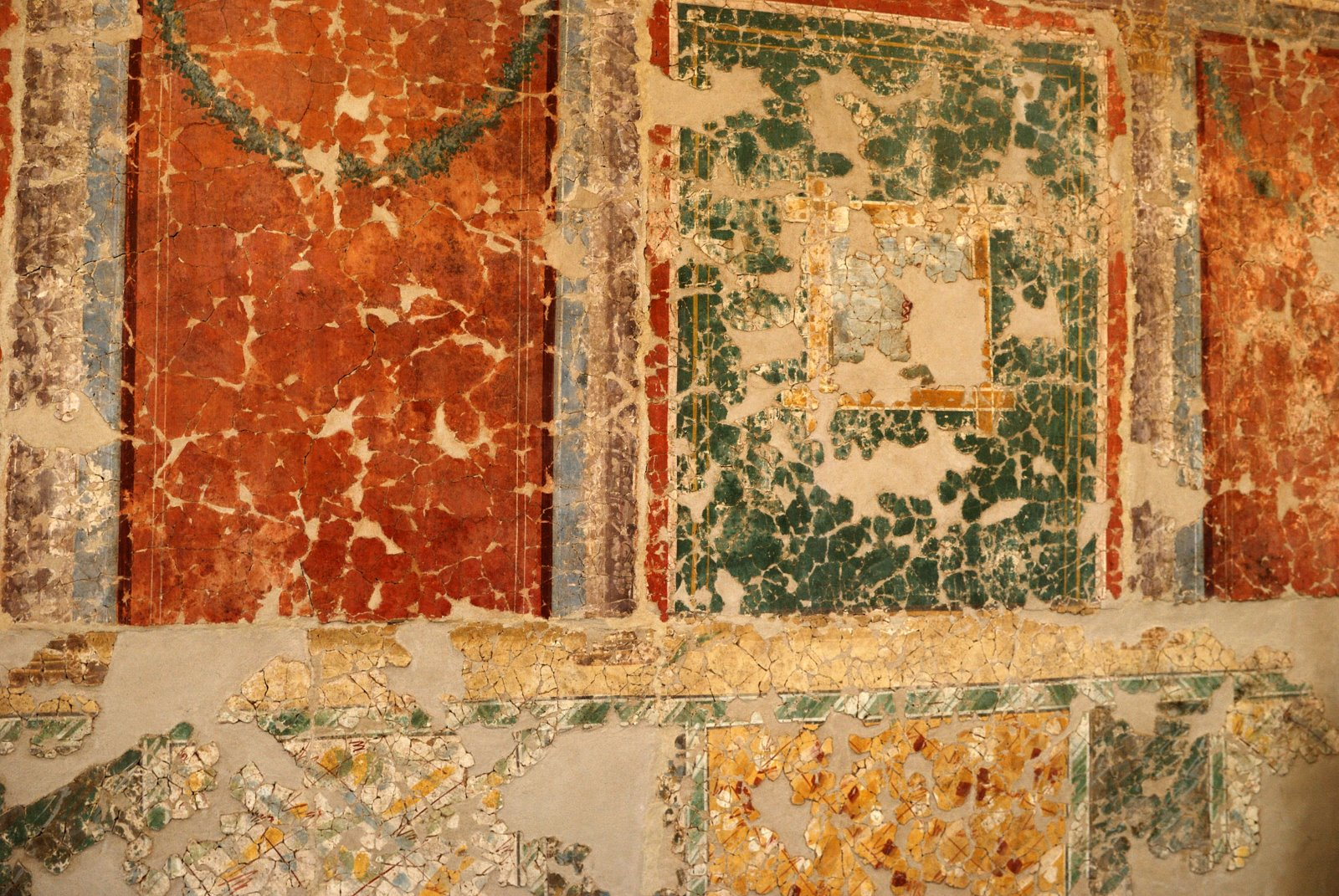
The Norfolk Street Roman Wall Paintings

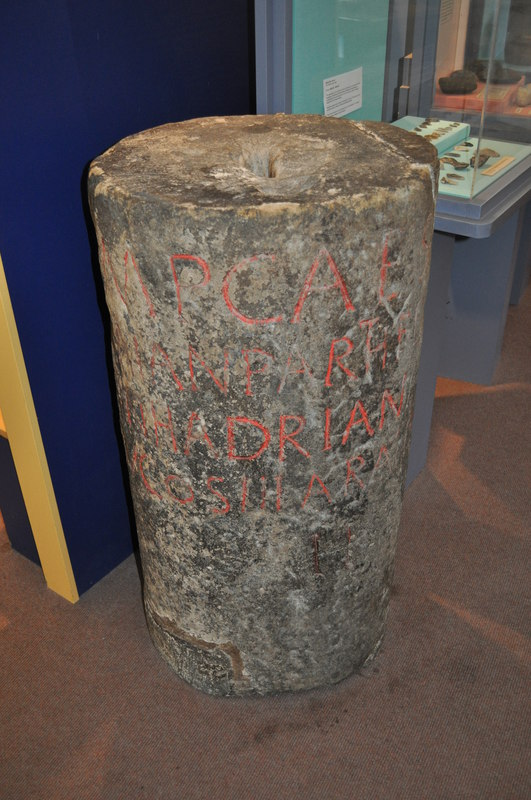
The Thurmaston Milestone

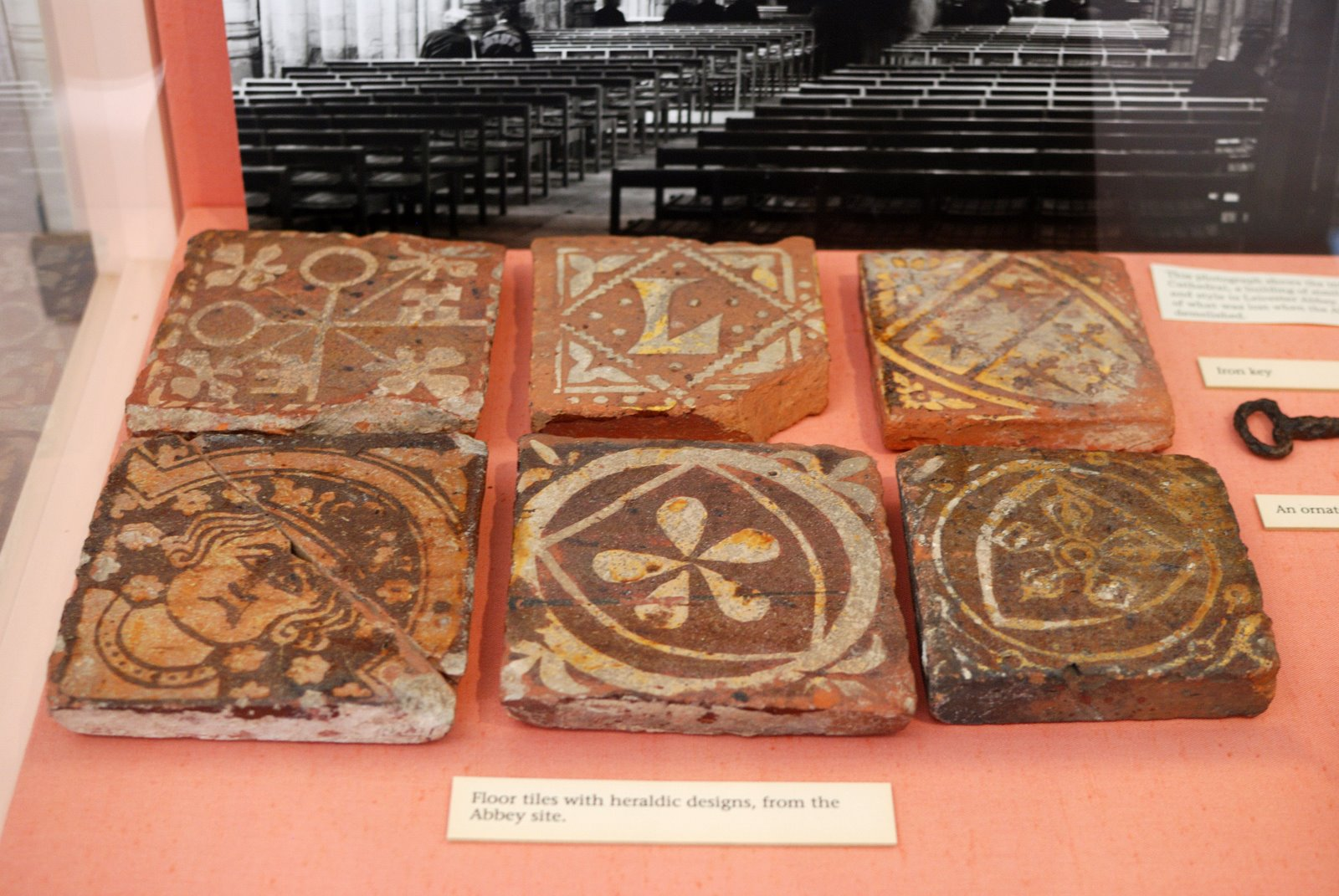
Tiles from Leicester Abbey
