= Jewry Wall =

Ruined wall in Leicester, England

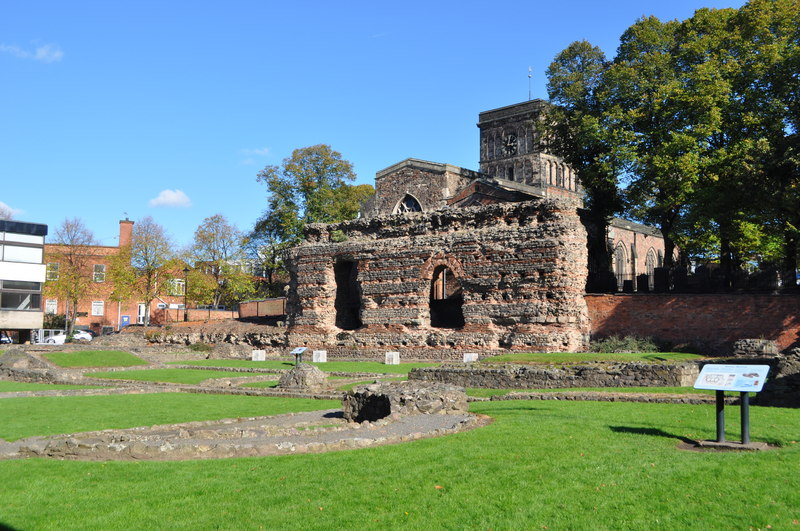
- The wall with St Nicholas' Church in the background

- Location within the East Midlands Location within the United Kingdom Location within Europe
- 52°38′5.71″N 1°8′29.13″W
- Type: Roman
- Periods: Iron Age and Roman Empire
- Location: Leicester, England

Listed Building – Grade I
- Official name: Jewry Wall, St Nicholas Circle
- Designated: 5 January 1950
- Reference no.: 1074773

Map of central Leicester showing the location of the Jewry Wall (marked in green) among the key sites of Leicester Old Town. The Roman and medieval walls are marked by the dotted line. The churches are marked in red, the dissolved religious houses in black, and secular sites in blue.

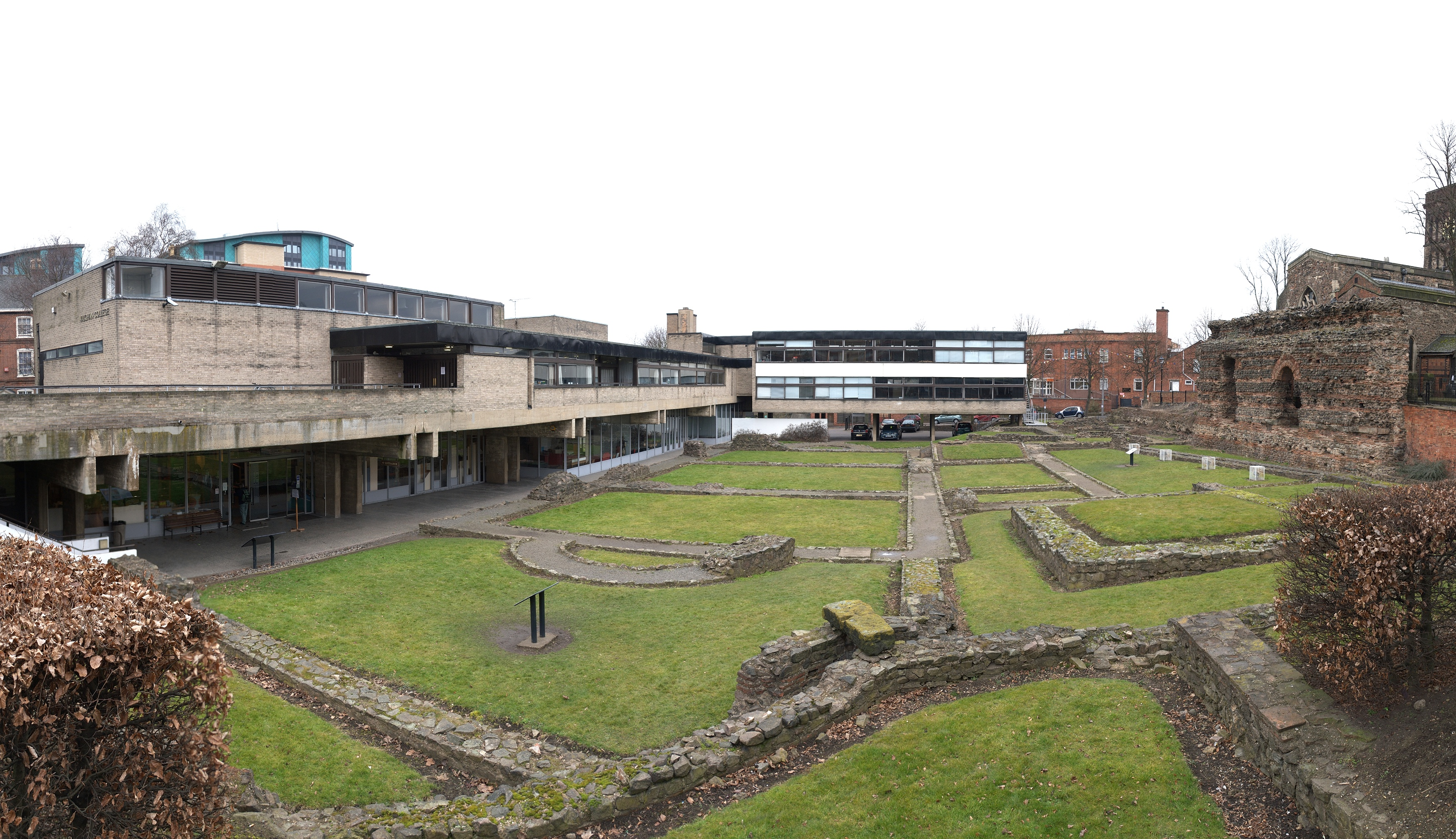
The foundations of the Roman baths. The Jewry Wall is visible on the extreme right of the photo, and Jewry Wall Museum on the left.

The Jewry Wall is a substantial ruined wall of 2nd-century Roman masonry, with two large archways, in Leicester, England. It stands alongside St Nicholas' Circle and St Nicholas' Church. It formed the west wall of a public building in Ratae Corieltauvorum (Roman Leicester), alongside public baths, the foundations of which were excavated in the 1930s and are also open to view. The wall gives its name to the adjacent Jewry Wall Museum.

== Etymology ==
The origin of the name of the wall (first recorded c. 1665) is debated. It is unlikely to relate to Leicester's medieval Jewish community, which was never large and was expelled from the town by Simon de Montfort in 1231. One theory that has achieved widespread currency is that the name bears some relation to the 24 "jurats" (meaning "sworn men", and roughly equivalent to aldermen) of early medieval Leicester, the senior members of the Corporation, who were said to have met, as a "jury", in the town churchyard—possibly that of St Nicholas. However, it seems more likely that the name derives from a broader folk belief attributing mysterious ruins of unknown origin to Jews. Such attributions are found at a number of other sites elsewhere in England and other parts of Europe.

== Description ==
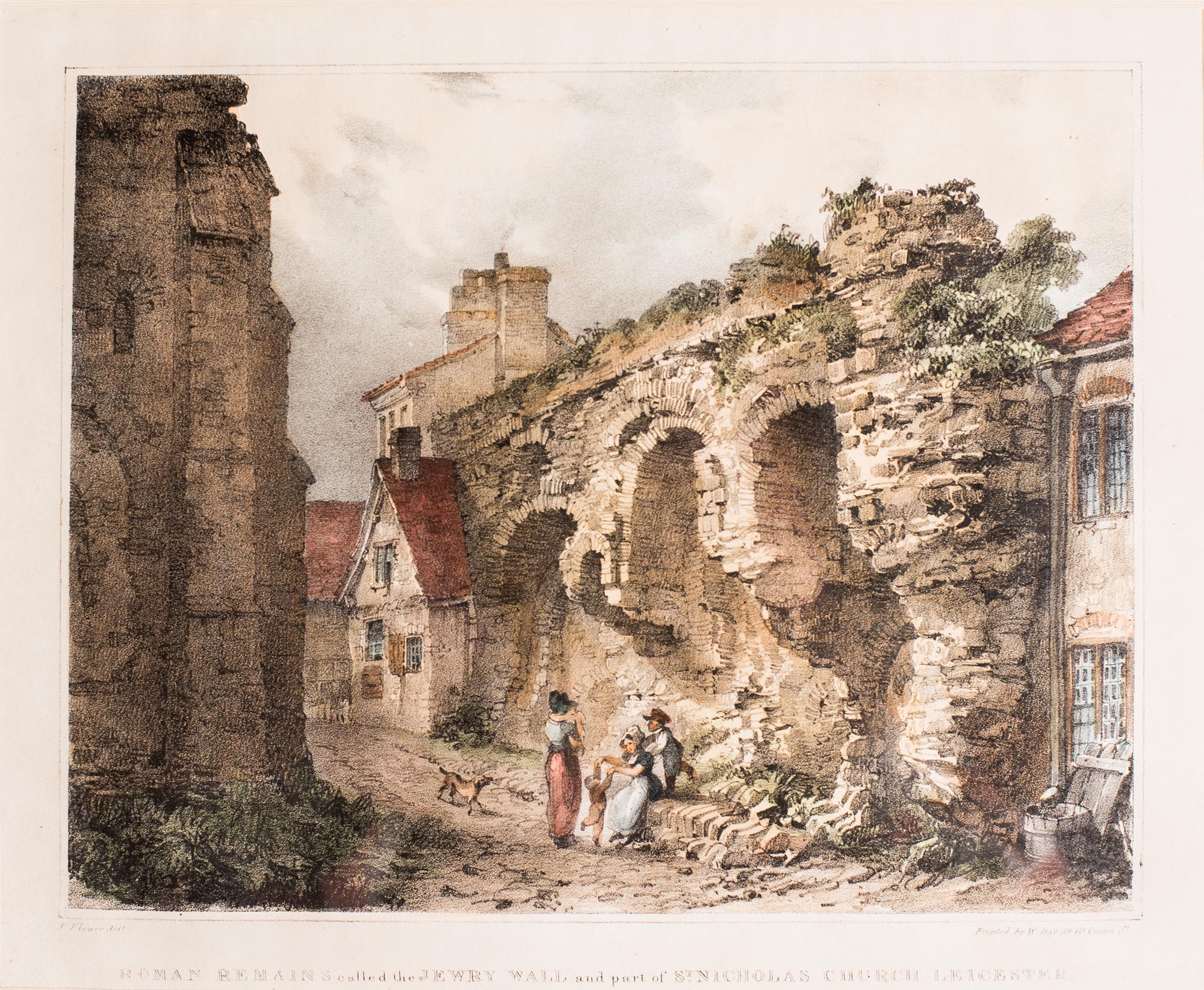
The eastern facade of Jewry Wall. An 1826 lithograph of a painting by the Leicester artist John Flower

The wall is an impressive example of standing Roman masonry. It dates to approximately 125–130 AD. It measures 23 m (75 ft) long, 8 m (26 ft) high and 2.5 m (8.2 ft) thick. It is among the largest pieces of surviving civil Roman architecture in Britain, and is comparable to the "Old Work" at Wroxeter. The structure comprises alternate bands of Roman brick and coursed masonry, of local granite, limestone and sandstone. In the centre of the wall are two large arched openings about 3 m (9.8 ft) wide and 4 m (13 ft) high, and there are further arched alcoves on the eastern side.

The wall lies immediately to the west of St Nicholas' Church, which includes in its late Saxon and early medieval fabric much reused Roman brick and masonry.

The remains of the Roman town's public baths, immediately west of the wall, were excavated in four seasons from 1936 to 1939 by Kathleen Kenyon. The wall and some of the foundations of the baths are now laid out to public view. They are adjoined by a 1960s building housing the Jewry Wall Museum (and formerly Vaughan College), which stands on the remainder of the baths site (including the site of the three furnaces). The museum contains excellent examples of Roman mosaics, painted wall plaster and other Roman and Iron Age artefacts from sites around Leicester.

The wall was taken into state care in 1920 and is now the responsibility of English Heritage. The wall itself is a Grade I listed building; its wider site, including the adjacent remains of the baths and St Nicholas' Church, forms a scheduled monument.

== Function and context ==
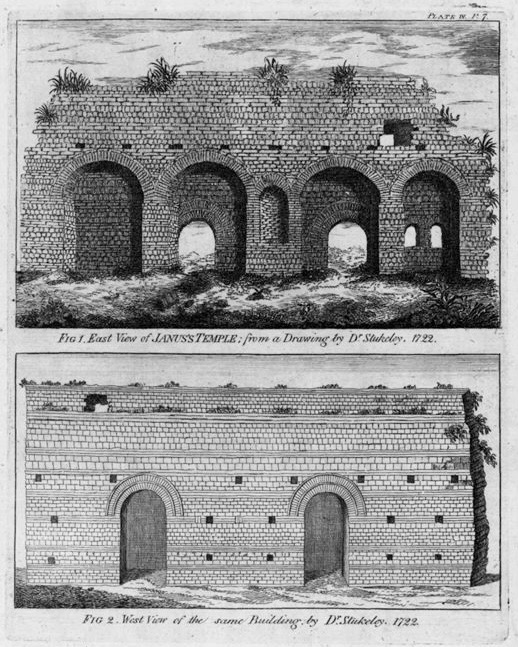
William Stukeley's 1722 drawing of the east and west elevations of Jewry Wall

The wall appears to have formed the long western side of a large rectangular basilica-like structure. The precise character and function of this building has been a matter of much debate. 18th- and early 19th-century antiquaries tended to identify it as a Roman or British temple, sometimes said to have been dedicated to the god Janus. The ruin was also occasionally identified as "part of a bath". For much of the 19th century it was widely believed to have been a town gate, though this was suggested by neither its structure nor its location. This interpretation still appeared as fact in the generally authoritative Victoria County History as late as 1907. The prevailing view in the early 20th century was that the ruin was part of the town basilica.

When she began her excavations in the late 1930s, Kenyon initially thought the overall site was that of the town forum (of which the basilica would have formed a part). Although she modified her views when she uncovered the remains of the baths, she continued to believe that the area had originally been laid out as the forum, with the Jewry Wall the west wall of the basilica, but argued that in a second phase of building, only about 20 years later, the site had been converted to public baths. This interpretation was abandoned when, in a series of excavations undertaken between 1961 and 1972, the true remains of the forum were firmly identified a block further east (Insula XXII). The Jewry Wall was then identified as the wall of the palaestra (gymnasium) of the baths complex, and this continues to be the most commonly accepted view, given in the official scheduled monument descriptions and in the interpretive material on site.

There are still a number of unanswered questions, however, and the issue remains open.

== Jewry Wall Museum ==
The Jewry Wall Museum faces the Jewry Wall ruins, and houses artefacts from Iron Age, Roman, and medieval Leicester. The building is Grade II listed. The museum is run by Leicester City Council.

After being closed from 2017 for renovations costing nearly £17 million, the museum reopened in July 2025, with a refreshed design, multimedia exhibitions, and fully immersive experiences.

== In popular culture ==
The Jewry Wall features as the "Old Bathhouse" in the 2020 video game Assassin's Creed Valhalla. It is in the town of Ledecestre, the form of the name of Leicester that appears in the Domesday Book of 1086.

== See also ==
- Ratae Corieltauvorum
- Roman Britain
- Roman client kingdoms in Britain
- Governors of Roman Britain
- Romano-British culture
- Sub-Roman Britain
- Roman sites in Great Britain
- End of Roman rule in Britain
- History of the British Isles
- Britannia (disambiguation)
- Newport Arch

== Bibliography ==
- Anon. (n.d.), The Jewry Wall and Bath Complex, Leicester City Council: pdf available at "Jewry Wall: Description of the Monuments". Leicester City Council. Archived from the original on 14 January 2015.
- Harris, Oliver (2008). "Jews, jurats and the Jewry Wall: a name in context" (PDF). Transactions of the Leicestershire Archaeological and Historical Society. 82: 113–33.
- Hebditch, Max; Mellor, Jean (1972). "The Forum and Basilica of Roman Leicester". Britannia. 4: 1–83. doi:10.2307/525857. JSTOR 525857. S2CID 162310076.
- Kenyon, Kathleen M. (1948). Excavations at the Jewry Wall Site, Leicester. Society of Antiquaries of London Research Report. Vol. 15. Oxford.
- Mitchell, Steve (2009). "Correspondence" (PDF). Transactions of the Leicestershire Archaeological and Historical Society. 83: 335.
