= Blackheath Quaker Meeting House =

Quaker meeting house in London

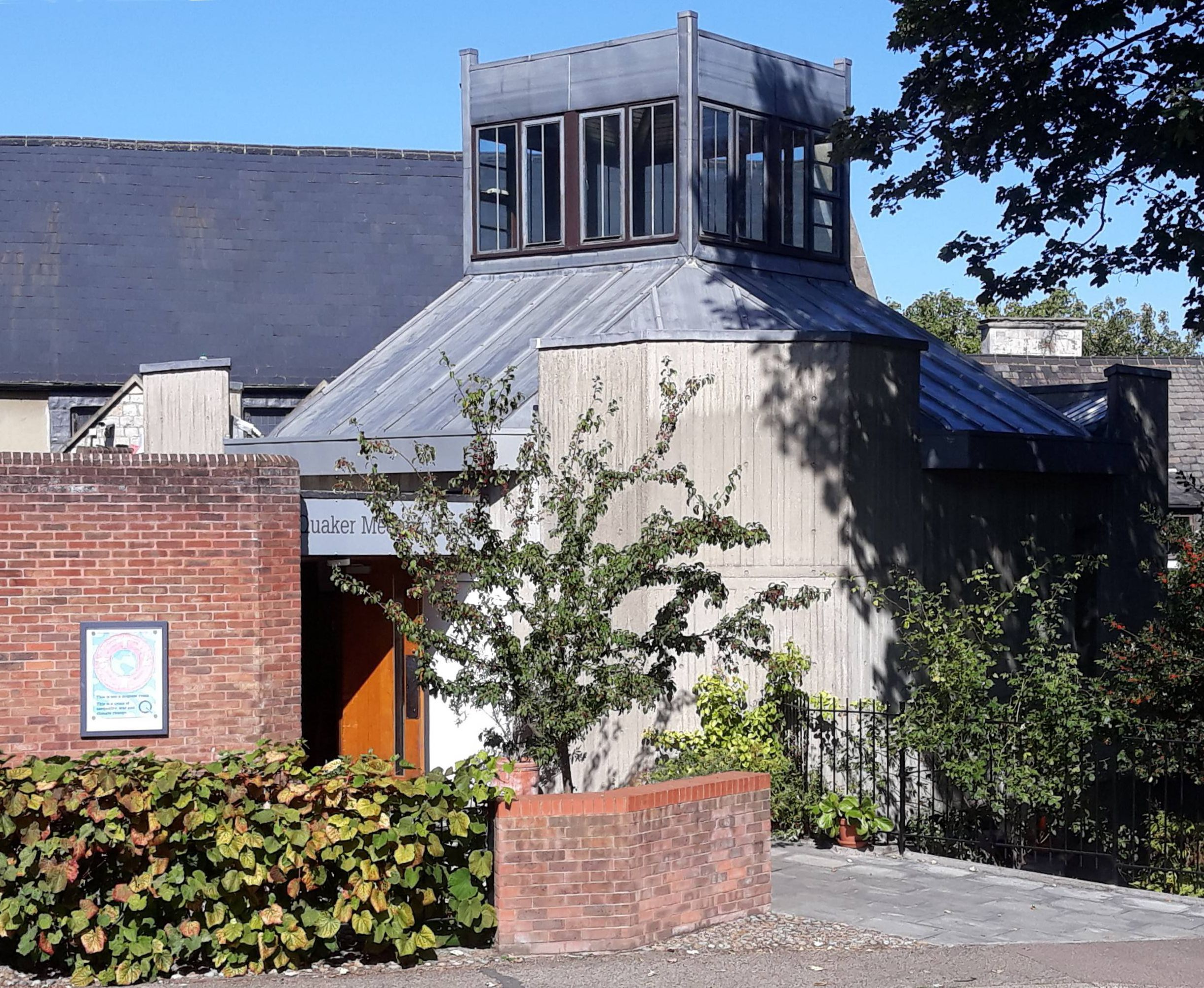
- The meeting house from the south

- Location within Greater London Blackheath Quaker Meeting House (London Borough of Lewisham)

Religion
- Affiliation: Religious Society of Friends
- Ecclesiastical or organisational status: Meeting House
- Status: Active

Location
- Location: Lawn Terrace, Blackheath, London SE3 9LL, United Kingdom
- Coordinates: 51.465063°N 0.006968°E

Architecture
- Architect: Trevor Dannatt
- Style: Brutalist/Modernist
- General contractor: R. Mansell
- Groundbreaking: 1971
- Completed: 1972
- Construction cost: £37,842

Specifications
- Direction of façade: South
- Capacity: 100
- Materials: board-marked concrete, stock bricks, blockwork
- Listed Building – Grade II
- Official name: Blackheath Quaker Meeting House with cobbled area of forecourt
- Designated: 8 May 2019
- Reference no.: 1462016

Website
- www.blackheathquakers.org.uk

Blackheath Quaker Meeting House is a Grade II listed building in the London Borough of Lewisham. It has been the home of Blackheath Quaker Meeting since 1972, and is also used by many community groups. Designed by Trevor Dannatt, it is believed to be the only Quaker Meeting House in Britain built in the concrete Brutalist style. In the survey of Quaker meeting houses conducted by the Architectural History Practice for Historic England and Quakers in Britain it was described as a "Brutalist jewel" and "of exceptional aesthetic value".

== History ==
Quakers met at various places in south-east London from the late seventeenth century onwards, including Greenwich, Deptford and Woolwich. When the existing Meeting at Woolwich outgrew its meeting house in the 1960s, the Meeting moved to Blackheath, where most of its members lived, and the meeting house was sold in 1964. Initially the Meeting met in church buildings, latterly that of the Congregational Church in Independents Road, Blackheath.

Six Weeks Meeting (now London Quakers Property Trust), the managing trustee of London's Quaker meeting houses, purchased land in central Blackheath with a view to building a new meeting house, but the project did not proceed. The Congregationalists leased Quakers a small (0.044 ha) building plot at the end of Independents Road, next to their church hall. The brief for the new building—"a modern building to fit in with the forward-looking community around it"—was issued in 1967.

The meeting house was to contain some facilities intended for joint use with the Congregationalists. Shortly after the meeting house was completed, the Congregational church became redundant when the Congregational and Presbyterian churches merged at the national level to form the United Reformed Church, and the church and church hall buildings subsequently passed into other hands.

== Design and construction ==
The Congregationalists recommended the appointment of Trevor Dannatt, the architect who had been responsible for the remodelling of their church in 1957. Ted Happold of Ove Arup was the structural engineer. Dannatt (a Congregationalist) and Happold (a Quaker) had recently worked together on the new assembly hall (also Grade II listed) at Bootham School. The job architect was David Greenwood, also a Quaker.

Construction finally took place between September 1971 and September 1972, and the first Meeting for Worship in the new building was held in October 1972.

Parts of the building have since been renewed in the original idiom. A major refurbishment in 2013 paid particular attention to improved wheelchair access.

== Form ==
The building is on two levels: the main entrance is on Lawn Terrace, which runs parallel to Independents Road and at a higher level, and there is a lower entrance from Independents Road. It links to the former church hall, but access between the two buildings no longer exists. Viewed from the main road (Blackheath Village), the building forms "an arresting termination to the road [sc. Independents Road]".

The main structure enclosing the meeting room on the upper level is in board-marked concrete, square in plan with chamfered corners, supporting a pyramidal roof topped by a square lantern. Its relationship to the adjacent church hall recalls that of a chapter house with a cathedral—an impression reinforced by its octagonal shape, as seen in several English chapter houses. The structure is rotated by about 45 degrees in order to minimise interference with the light to the church hall. At the corners the concrete wall is extended upwards to form "turrets".

The structure has resemblances to Dannatt's Bootham School assembly hall: it rests on five concrete piers, and the walls function as beams supporting the floor. The trussed roof structure, with exposed timber compression struts and steel tension members carrying the lantern, is somewhat simpler, having been designed to be within the competence of a carpenter. The external covering is terne-coated stainless steel (originally zinc).

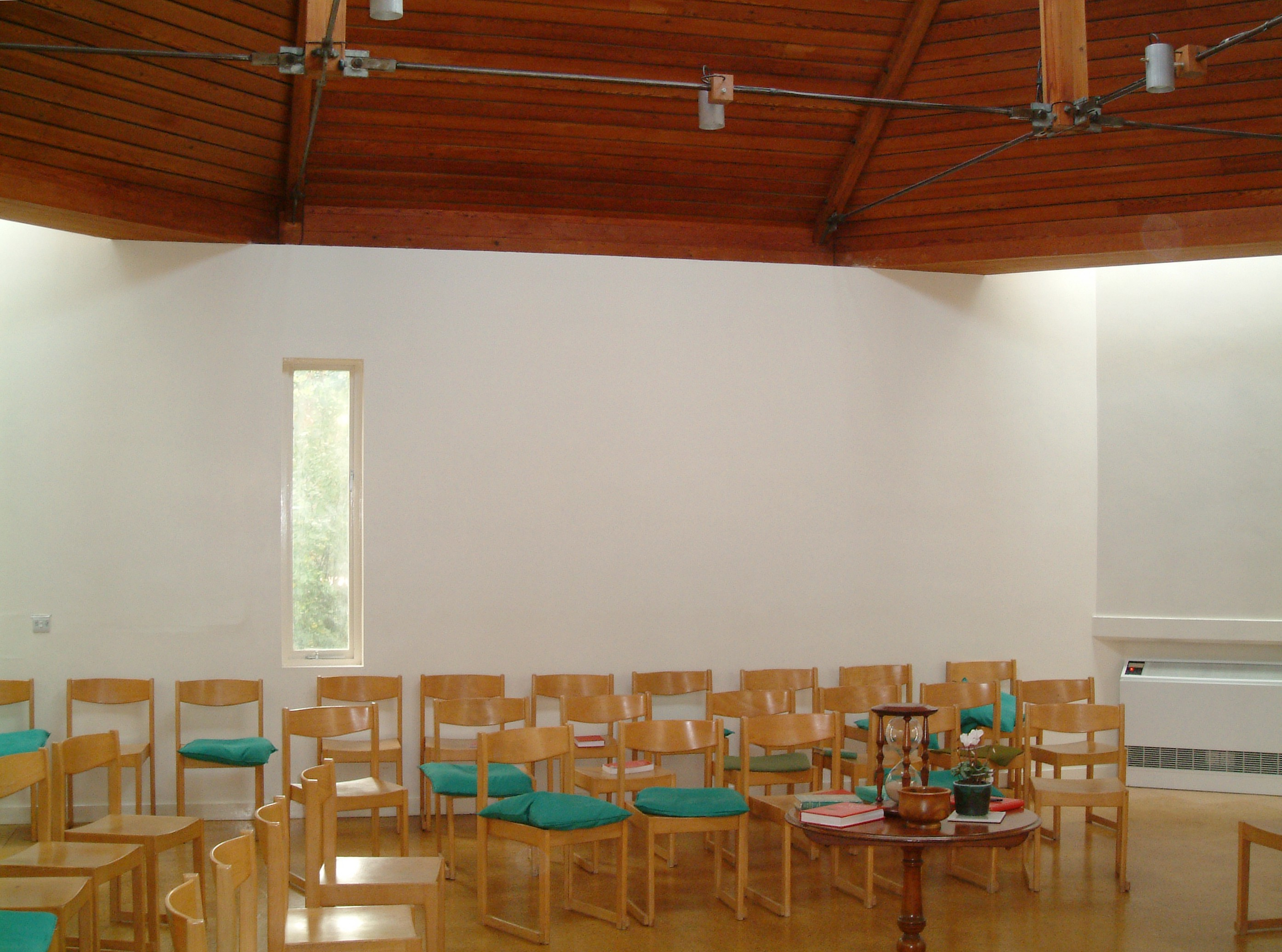
Interior of main meeting room

Internally, the meeting room is a near-square space 9 m × 9 m, intended to seat up to 100 in the usual chair arrangement. Here the non-structural inner leaf of the wall is in plastered blockwork. Installed on the advice of an acoustics consultant, a blockwork sub-wall prevents the space being perfectly square. The ceiling and lantern are lined with Kara Sea redwood, and the floor is cork tiles.

To the west of the meeting room, a large lobby and essential services (kitchen, toilet, storage) are enclosed by a cavity wall in stock brick and have a flat roof. The brick walls are mainly plastered, but the concrete of the main meeting room is also visible, and other walls are in blockwork or exposed brick. The route between the main entrance and the meeting room involves a turn of at least 180 degrees. (In plan, the meeting room and the lobby form a large letter Q.) The sense of progress along the route is emphasised by changes in the wall angles and progressively increasing ceiling heights—and, in the original colour scheme, by paint colours that changed gradually from dark grey to white. At the end of the route lies a soaring light-filled space extending more than 7.5 m upwards.

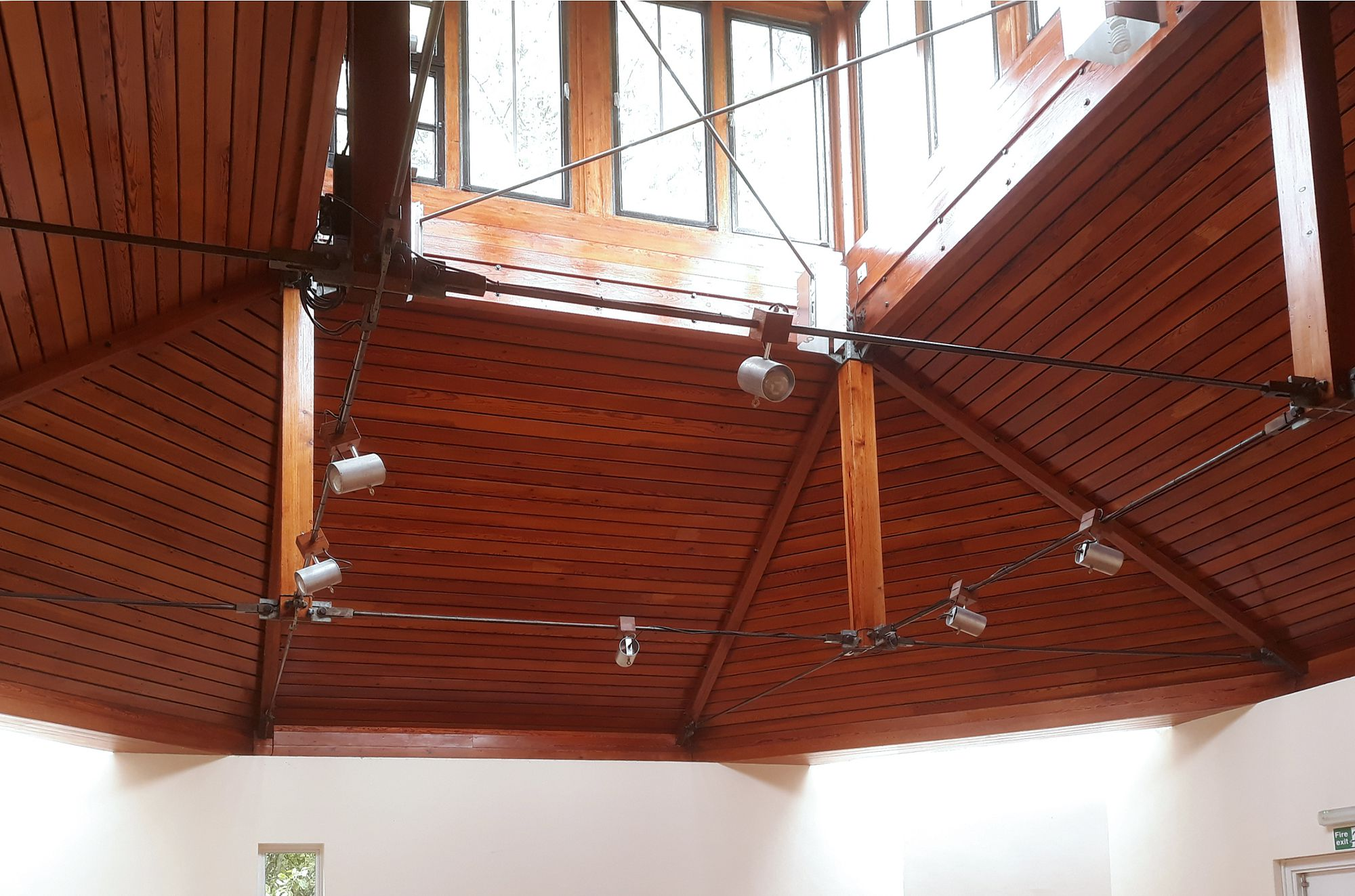
Ceiling, lantern and luminaires

The meeting room is lit principally by the lantern, with additional light supplied by skylights in each of the corner turrets. Otherwise the space has only a single window at low level, which "provides the visitor with a view of the street he has just come from – a means of reorientation after the spiral journey". Artificial light comes from four light fittings below the lantern and from fluorescent tubes in the four skylights. The special light fittings were designed by the architect, and echo the shape of the room; originally made from offcuts of the zinc roof covering, they have been reconstructed in stainless steel.

Seating mainly takes the form of separate wooden chairs, but some wooden benches from earlier meeting houses have been retained. Surface finishes in the building express the Quaker testimony of simplicity. The architect's inclusion of a Christian symbol is highly unusual in Quaker meeting houses.

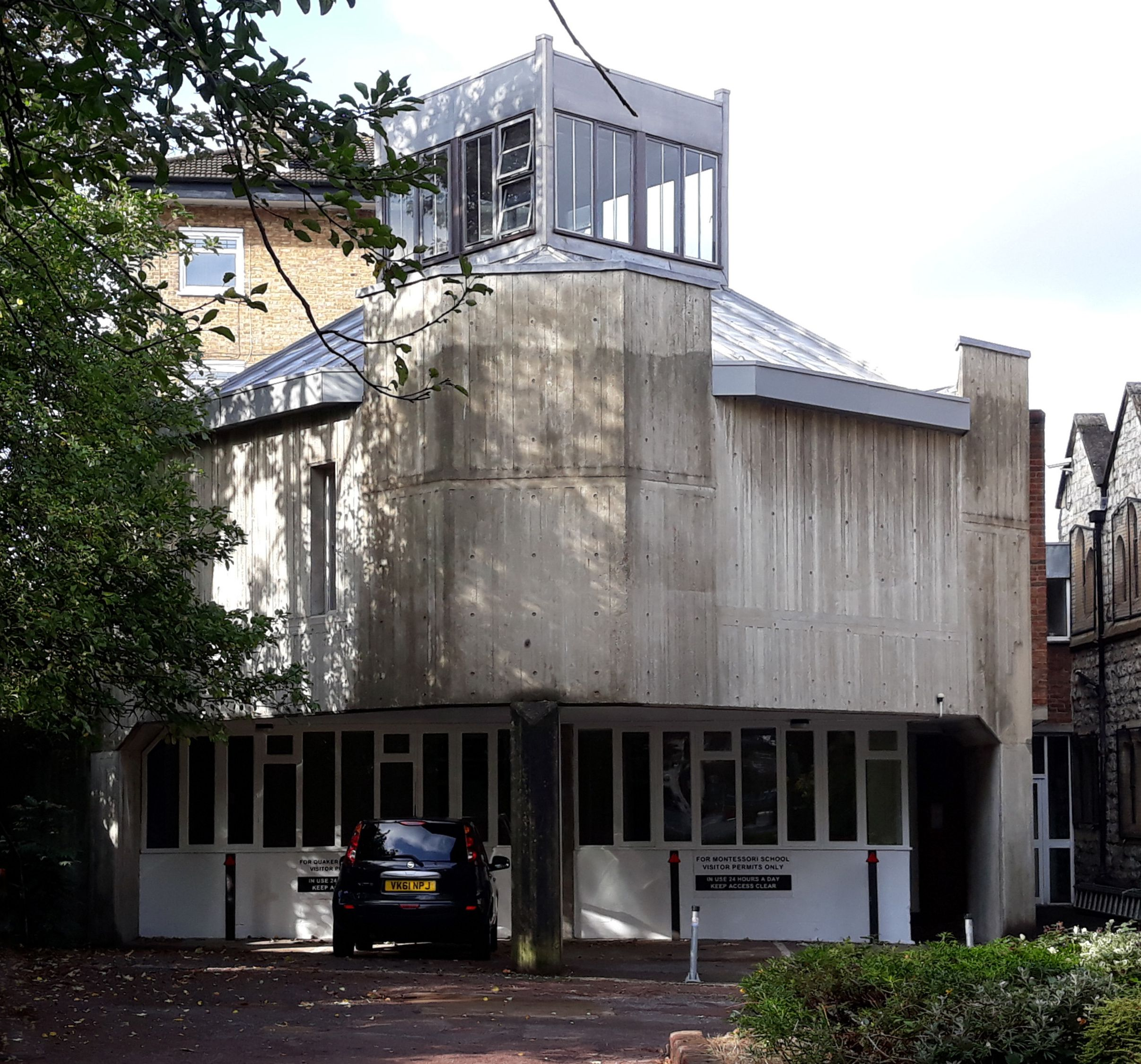
Eastern elevation seen from Independents Road

At the lower level a long "committee room" or classroom, opening off a lobby, can be divided into two unequal halves by a retractable screen. The lobby also gives access to toilets, kitchen and storage areas.

Parking spaces were provided within the curtilage to meet Local Authority requirements.

In front of the southern aspect, the cobbled area was originally separated from the Lawn Terrace pavement by wooden posts. In 2010 this area became a Peace Garden, with a separating wall, a seat, steel railings and new plantings.

== Awards ==
The building received a Civic Trust award in 1973 and a Concrete Society commendation in 1974. The Civic Trust citation refers to "a good neighbourly building where the architectural concept is enhanced by the quality of detailing and workmanship of the finished product".

In May 2019, together with several other Quaker meeting houses, the building was awarded Grade II listing by Historic England. The citation gave the following principal reasons for listing:

Architectural interest:

- as a major work by Trevor Dannatt, a distinguished post-war architect;
- for its original design, transforming an exceptionally difficult site; dramatic exterior and interior effects are combined with carefully-judged and subtle details creating an atmosphere of quietness and contemplation suited to Quaker worship.

Historic interest:

- as the home of the Blackheath Quaker Meeting, which has its origins in the late C17.

== See also ==
- List of Quaker meeting houses
- List of Brutalist structures
