= Trevor Dannatt =

British architect (1920–2021)

- Born: 15 January 1920
- Died: 16 February 2021 (aged 101)
- Occupation: architect
- Employer: Dannatt Johnson
- Notable work: British Embassy in Riyadh, Saudi Arabia, Conversion of Royal Naval College Greenwich
- Style: Modernist

Trevor Dannatt OBE (15 January 1920 – 16 February 2021) was a British architect.

== Career ==
He studied architecture at the Regent's Polytechnic. In 1943 he joined the practice of modernist architects Maxwell Fry and Jane Drew. In 1948 he joined the London County Council architects department, where he worked on the Royal Festival Hall. Peter Moro was his team leader. In 1952 he formed his own practice.

He was elected to the Royal Academy in 1983 and was awarded an OBE in the 2016 New Year Honours. He died in February 2021 at the age of 101.

National Life Stories conducted an oral history interview (C467/70) with Dannatt in 2001 for its Architects Lives' collection held by the British Library.

== Works ==
- Intercontinental Hotel and King Faisal Conference Hall, Riyadh Saudi Arabia
- Royal Festival Hall
- Laslett House, Cambridge
- Royal Botanic Gardens Kew, Victoria Gate building
- Blackheath Quaker Meeting House
- Vaughan College, Leicester
