= Ratae Corieltauvorum =

Former Roman town on the site of Leicester, England

Coordinates: 52.6349°N 1.1413°W

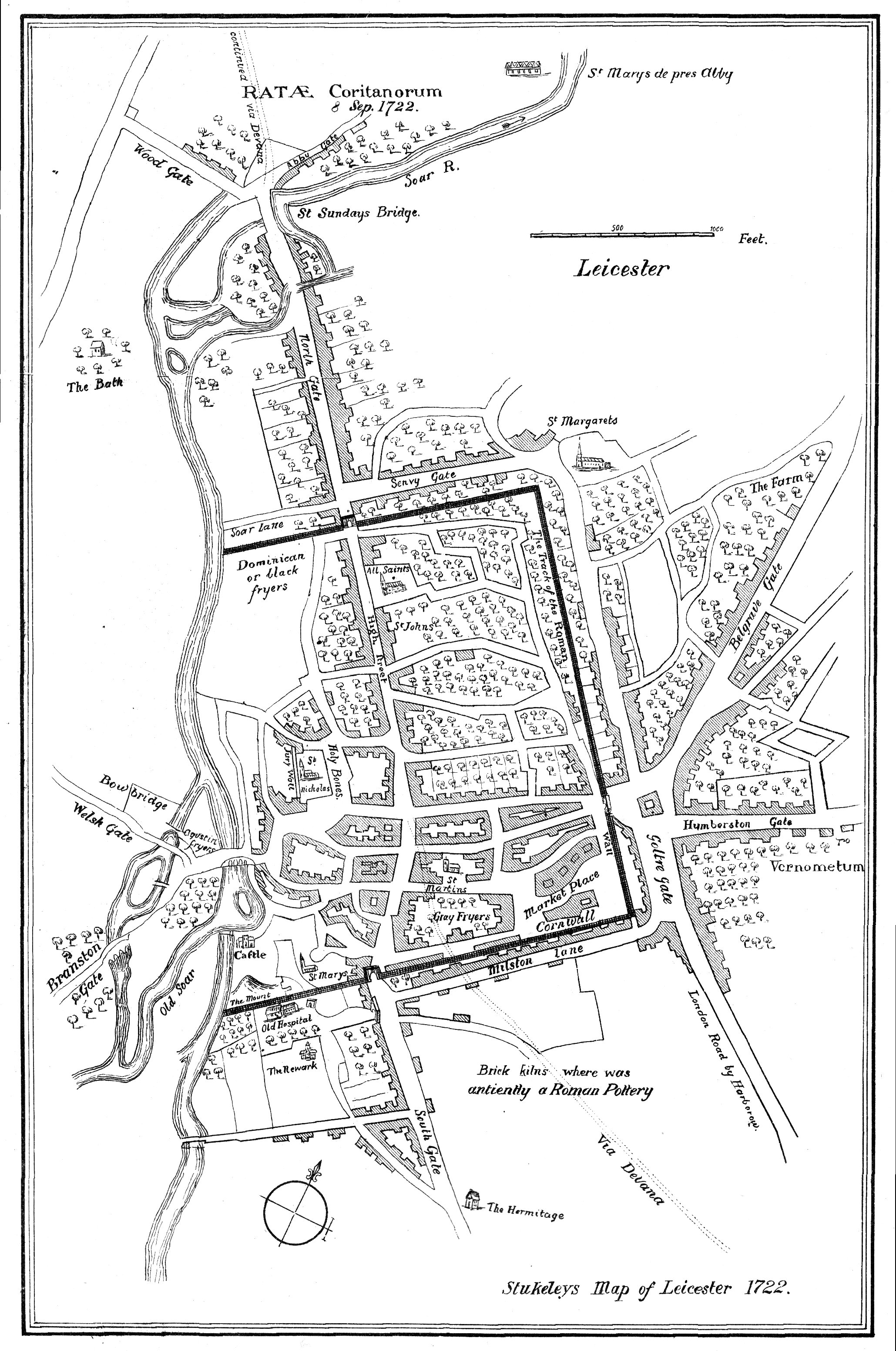
William Stukeley's 1722 map of Leicester, showing the boundaries of the old Roman city walls

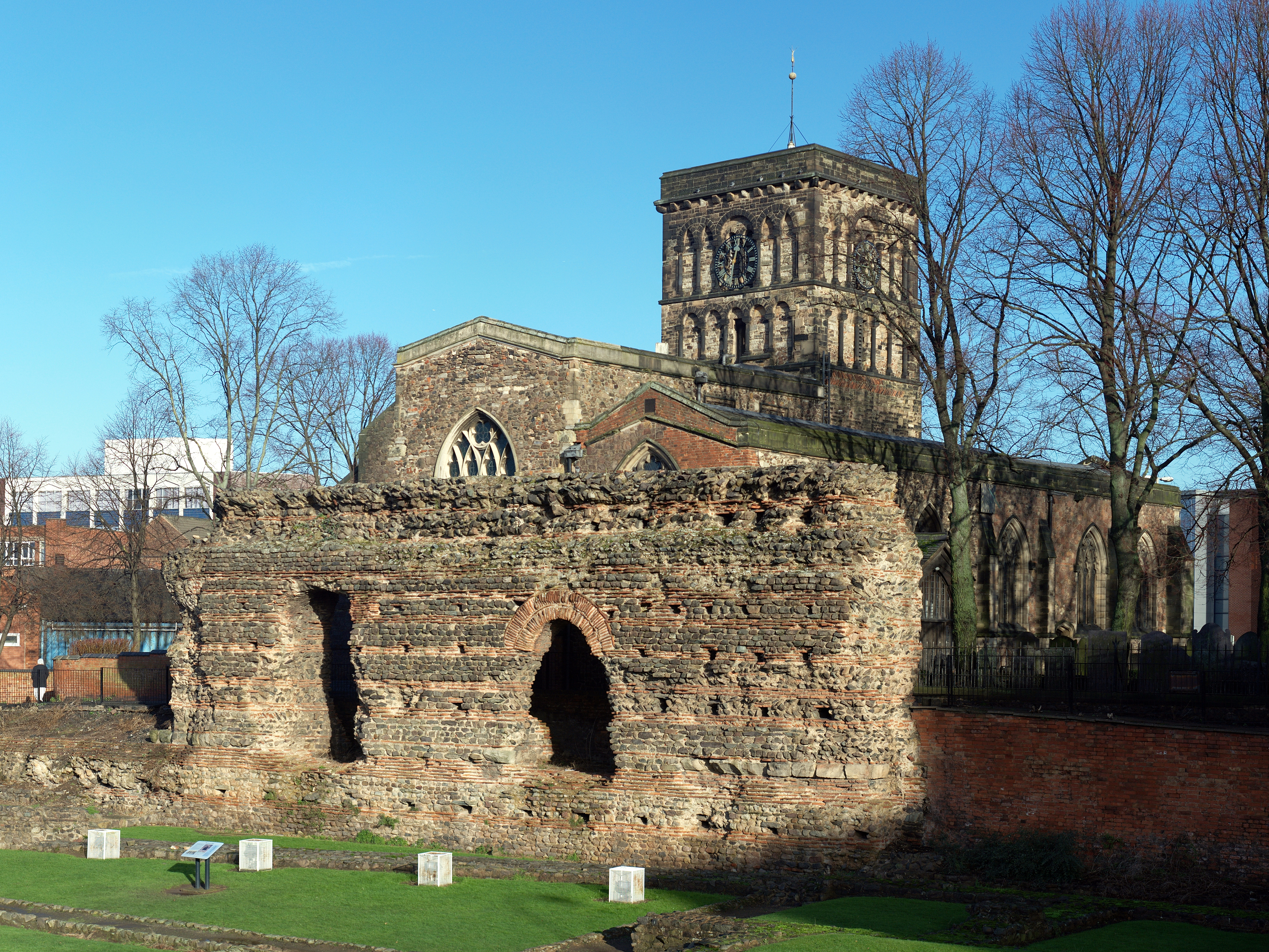
The Jewry Wall, remains of the Roman baths

Ratae Corieltauvorum or simply Ratae was a town in the Roman province of Britannia. Today it is known as Leicester, located in the English county of Leicestershire.

== Name ==
Ratae is a latinate form of the Brittonic word for "ramparts" (cf. Gaelic rath), suggesting the site was an Iron Age oppidum. This generic name was distinguished by "of the Corieltauvians", the name of the Celtic tribe whose capital it served as under the Romans.

The town was mistakenly known as Ratae Coritanorum in later records. However, an inscription recovered in 1983 showed that it was corrupt and "Corieltauvorum" was the proper form of the name.

== History ==
=== Prehistory ===
The native settlement encountered by the Romans at the site seems to have developed in the 2nd or 1st centuries BC. This area of the Soar was split into two channels: a main stream to the east and a narrower channel on the west, with a presumably marshy island between. The settlement seems to have controlled a ford across the larger channel.

=== Roman ===
==== Establishment ====
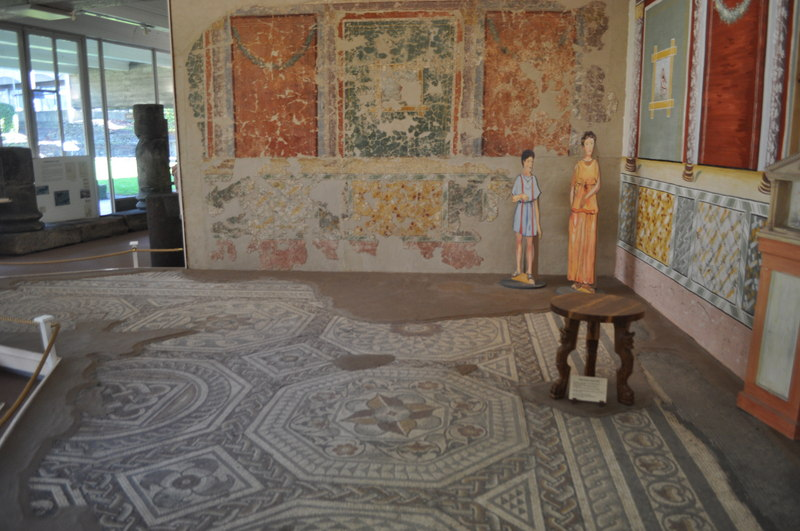
Blackfriars house reconstruction

After the Romans invaded Britain in the 1st century, they quickly established control over the southeast corner of the island, but for at least a couple of decades they did not advance north and west in an attempt to subdue the rest of the island. Two legionary fortresses were established; one at Isca (Exeter) in the southwest corner of the territory and the other at Lindum (Lincoln) in the northeast. A road, now known as the Fosse Way, was then established between the two to help control the border. The Fosse Way crossed the Soar close to the site of the British settlement. One of the enigmas of Ratae's early development was whether or not there was ever a garrison stationed in the vicinity. The location—at a river crossing on a strategic road near a native settlement—would have been an ideal place for a fort. As yet, however, there is minimal evidence of one: only a single V-shaped ditch with a drainage slot at the bottom, found on the island between the two river channels. This ditch is similar in form to a type of military ditch known as a punic ditch, with one side steeper than the other and a drainage slot at the bottom. Although the suggestion that a Roman fort was established between two arms of the Soar around AD 50 cannot be ruled out, there is no evidence yet discovered of an associated fort.

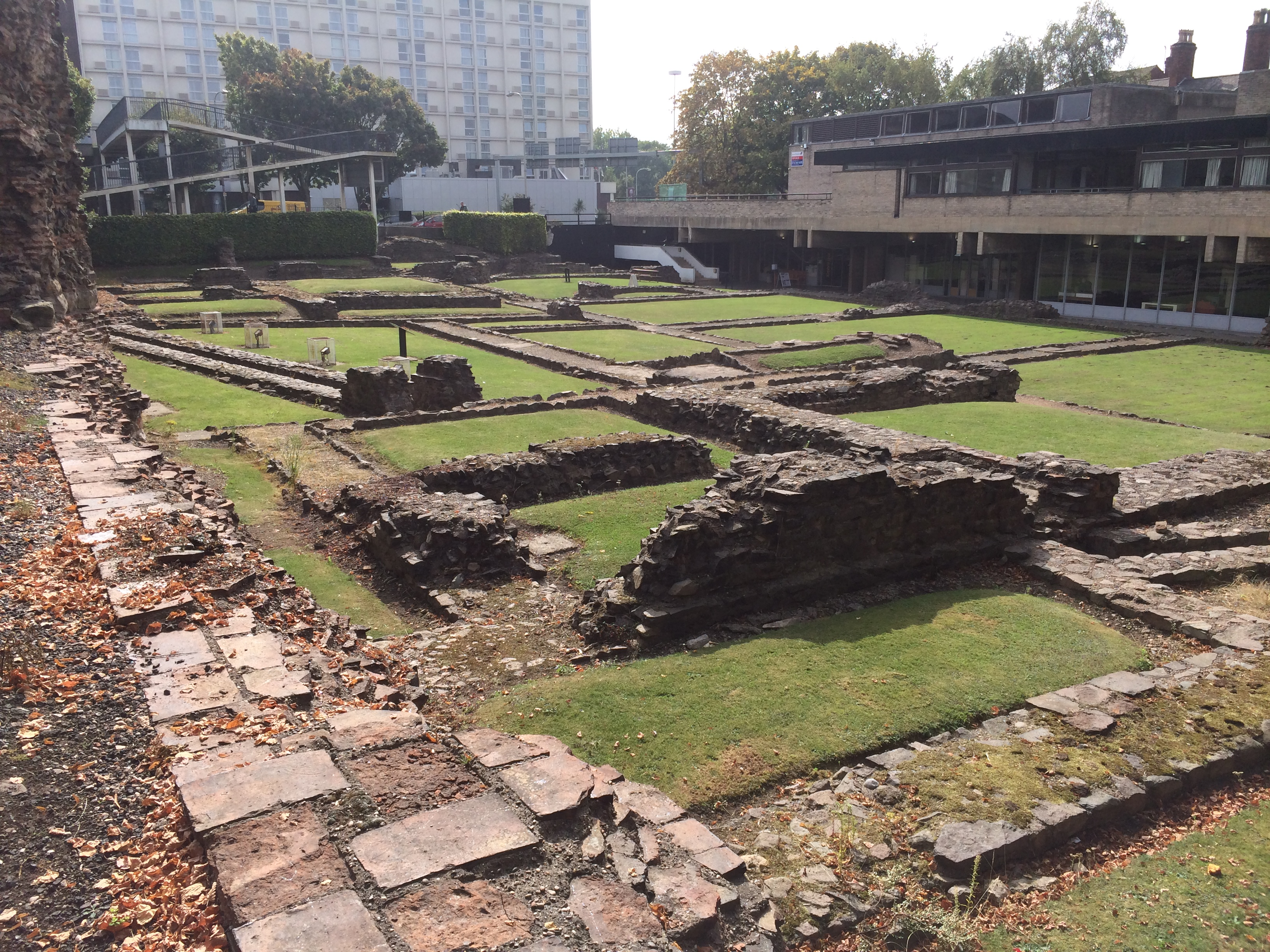
Remains of the Roman bath

==== Development ====
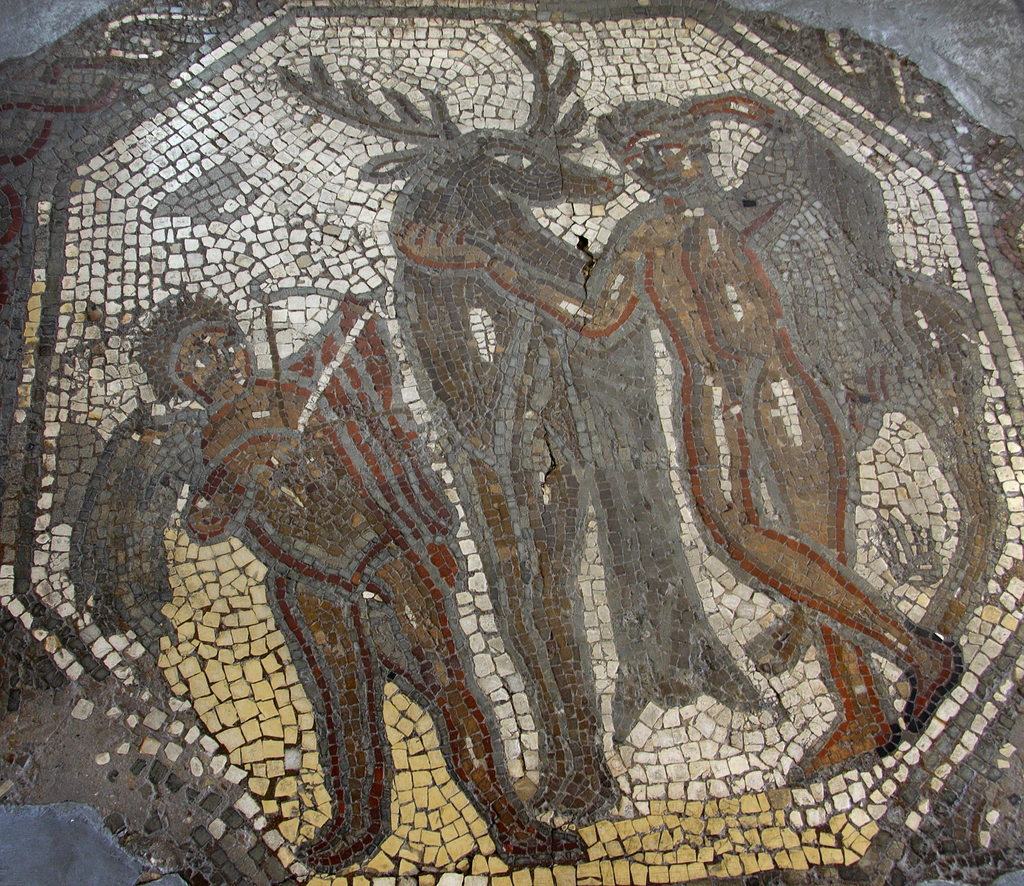
Mosaic of Cyparissus from High Cross street

Excavations starting in 2016 have revealed luxurious, highly decorated houses in central locations of the town. Painted wall plaster indicates that most of the rooms were decorated in a variety of colours and patterns and the houses also had sophisticated and colourful mosaic floors.

Earlier excavations indicated that instead of a forum, there was a simple open marketplace at the centre. However, in the early 2nd century, better-quality spacious stone houses were erected with central courtyards. A particularly fine excavated example had tesselated and mosaic floors, decorative plaster walls, and an elaborate frieze around its courtyard depicting theatrical masks, doves, pheasants, cupids, and flowers. It was not occupied for long, however, and part of it became a factory for the manufacture of horn objects. Other industries in the town included pottery production and metal and glass working. Eventually, the forum and basilica were built, though it did not fill the previous marketplace. Public baths soon followed, placed just to the west around the year 145. Fed by an aqueduct, they are of an unusual plan and had a large exercise room alongside. A second marketplace was laid out in the early 3rd century and a basilican market hall erected. Its offices had decoratively-painted plaster ceilings.

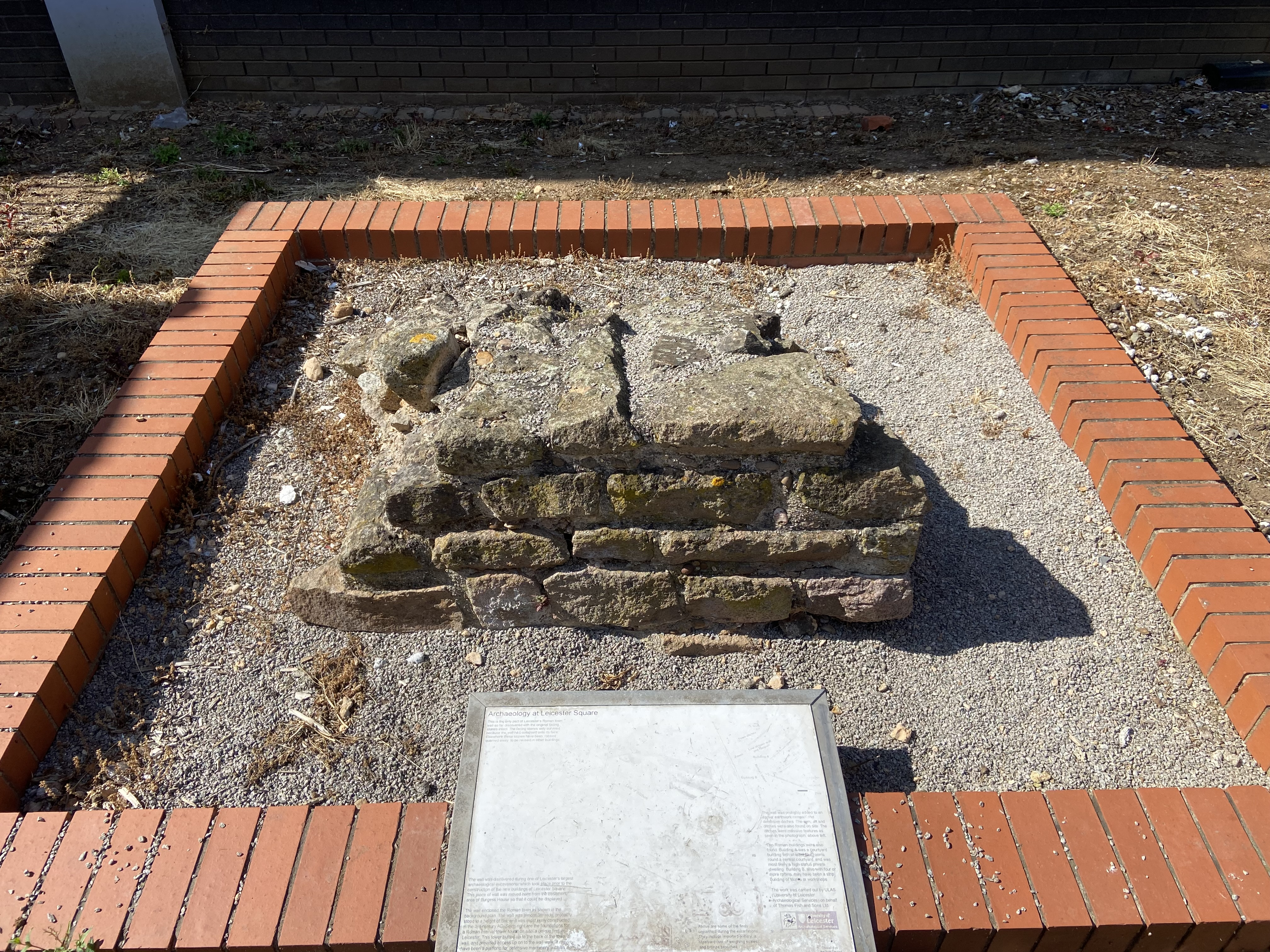
Remains of Ratae's old northern defensive wall on Junior Street.

A stone defensive circuit surrounded Ratae by the end of the 3rd century. There were four gateways with cemeteries outside each and a suburb to the north.

Only two suggested temples have been discovered in the town, one a possible Mithraeum.

=== Medieval ===
In the late 4th century, Ratae was occupied by a detachment of the Roman army and towers may have been added to the town walls. However, a serious fire spread through the town centre and the forum, basilica and market hall were never rebuilt. The settlement is generally identified as the Cair Lerion mentioned among the 28 cities of Britain by the later History of the Britons traditionally attributed to Nennius. Not much is known about it after the Roman withdrawal from Britain, but there was still a much reduced occupation of the town in the 5th and 6th centuries.

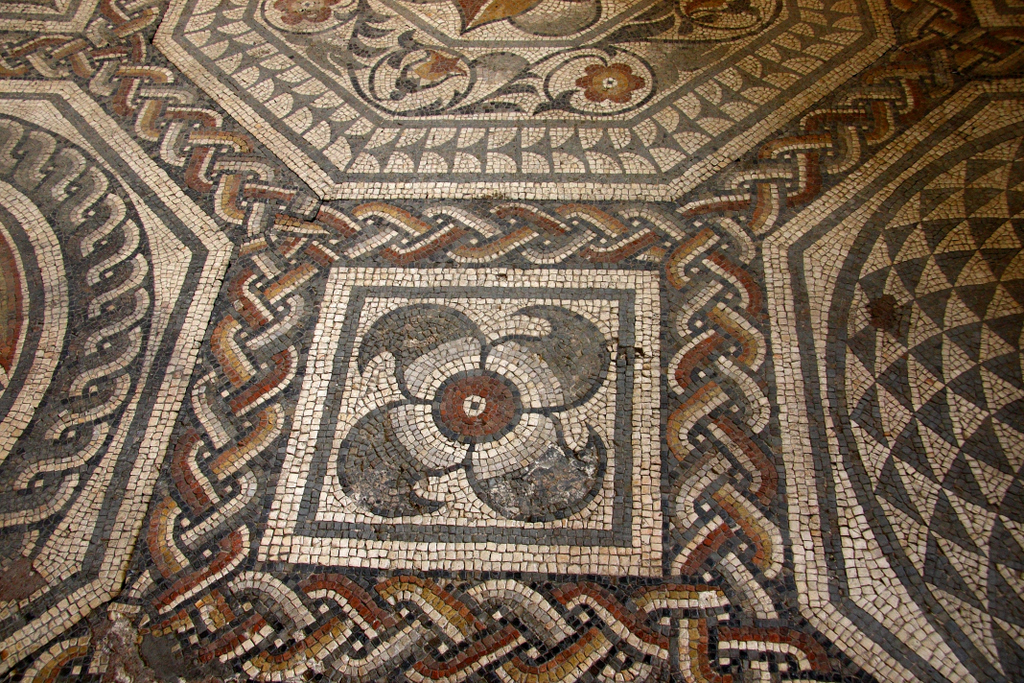
The Blackfriars Pavement, now installed at the Jewry Wall Museum

== Remains ==
The Roman name survives in the names of various clubs and societies based in the modern city of Leicester, such as Ratae Co-Operative Players (amateur dramatics) and Ratae Road Club (cycling). Physical remains include:

- The Jewry Wall, a large wall believed to have formed part of the public baths complex
- Raw Dykes, an earthwork thought to be the remains of an aqueduct
- St Nicholas' Church, which incorporates substantial re-used Roman building materials
- A large collection of artefacts from Ratae on display in the Jewry Wall Museum
- A small section of the old city walls on Junior Street.
