= John Flower (artist) =

English painter (1793–1861)

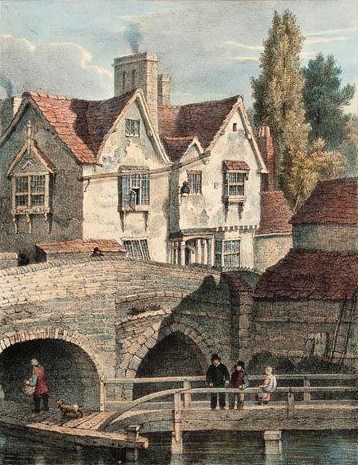
Old buildings on the West bridge, Leicester (1826)

John Flower (14 Oct 1793 – 29 Nov 1861) was an English landscape and architectural artist known to locals as "the Leicester artist".

Flower was born in Leicester, the son of John Flower, a wool comber, and his wife Mary, whose family had for generations owned the Castle Mill on the River Soar. The family became reduced in circumstances after the early death of his father and in 1806 he was apprenticed to a framework knitter, Benjamin Withers.

However, Flower's talent for drawing was noticed by a local doctor who gave him art lessons, and he was eventually taken under the wing of Mary Linwood (a local schoolmistress and celebrated seamstress) who arranged for him to study art in London with Peter de Wint for a year.

On returning to Leicester he became a professional art teacher and landscape artist. In 1813, he married Francis Clark - they had 3 children, but only one, Elizabeth (b. 10 Nov 1816), survived to adulthood. By 1819, he was a member of the Unitarian church. He lived at several addresses in Leicester, eventually moving, in 1851, to a substantial house in Upper Regent Street (now 100 and 102 Regent Road) designed by himself and architect Henry Goddard. He remained there for the rest of his life.

Flower died in 1861 at his home in Leicester. There is now a blue plaque on the wall commemorating his residency there. He is buried in Welford Road Cemetery.

== Work ==
Early in his career Flower drew and painted in Leicester and Leicestershire, but later worked further afield in neighbouring counties and north Wales. He worked in oils, watercolour, pencil and wash, and is mainly known for his landscapes and drawings of buildings. His art, particularly his book of Lithographs, "Views of Ancient Buildings in the Town and County of Leicester" (1826) is an important historical record of Leicester and Leicestershire as it looked in the early 19th century.

A number of Flower's works are in Leicester's New Walk Museum & Art Gallery, and the William Salt Library in Staffordshire but many are also in private collections making it difficult to compile an exhaustive catalogue.

== Notes ==
- Flower, John. Views of Ancient Buildings in the Town and County of Leicester (Leicester, 1826).
