= Conor P. Delaney =

Irish-American colorectal surgeon and professor

- Delaney in 2016
- Born: Conor Patrick Delaney; Dublin, Ireland
- Education: University College Dublin (MD); Royal College of Surgeons in Ireland (M.Ch.); University College Dublin (PhD)
- Occupation: Surgeon
- Known for: Laparoscopic colorectal surgery, enhanced recovery pathways
- Relatives: Peter V. Delaney (father); Edward Peter O'Kelly (great-grandfather)
- Medical career
- Field: Colorectal surgery
- Institutions: Cleveland Clinic; Case Western Reserve University
- Website: my.clevelandclinic.org/staff/3550-conor-delaney

Conor P. Delaney MD, MCh, PhD, FRCSI, FACS, FASCRS, FRCSI (Hon.) is an Irish-American colorectal surgeon, CEO and President of the Cleveland Clinic Florida, the Robert and Suzanne Tomsich Distinguished Chair in Healthcare Innovation, and Professor of Surgery at the Cleveland Clinic Lerner College of Medicine. He is a President of the American Society of Colon and Rectal Surgeons (ASCRS). He was previously Chairman of the Digestive Disease & Surgery Institute at the Cleveland Clinic. He is a Fellow and Honorary Fellow of the Royal College of Surgeons in Ireland and a Fellow of the American College of Surgeons and American Society of Colon and Rectal Surgeons.

Delaney's research contributions include various aspects of surgery, surgical cost-efficiency and surgical education, while his clinical research contributions include developing enhanced recovery pathways in minimally invasive laparoscopic colorectal surgery, carcinoma of the colon and rectum, Crohn's disease and Ulcerative colitis, sphincter-saving surgery, re-operative abdominal surgery, and colonoscopy.

== Education ==
Delaney earned his medical degree from the University College of Dublin School of Medicine, winning the Mater Misericordiae University Hospital gold medal in surgery. He became a fellow of the Royal College of Surgeons in Ireland and earned his master's degree in surgery (MCh) and Ph.D. from UCD, having worked under Thomas Starzl, the father of transplant surgery, and John Fung, at the University of Pittsburgh Medical Center in the areas of immunology, hepatobiliary disease and transplantation.

== Career ==
Delaney joined the Cleveland Clinic in 1999 on a fellowship to train with Dr. Victor Fazio. He was appointed an attending staff member in 2000, where he was a member of the departments of Colorectal Surgery and Minimally Invasive Surgery until 2005 when he was recruited to serve as chief of the Division of Colorectal Surgery and vice-chairman of the Department of Surgery at University Hospitals Case Medical Center and Case Western Reserve University, where he was Professor of Surgery for 10 years and surgical director of the UH Digestive Health Institute. In 2014, he was appointed as interim chair of the Department of Surgery at University Hospitals Case Medical Center and interim surgeon-in-chief of the University Hospitals Health System.

In 2015, Delaney was asked to be the Chairman of the Digestive Disease and Surgery Institute at the Cleveland Clinic and held the Victor W. Fazio MD Endowed Chair in Colorectal Surgery. As Chairman of the Clinic's Digestive Disease and Surgery Institute, Delaney supervised acute care/trauma surgery, bariatric surgery, breast surgery, colorectal surgery, gastroenterology, general surgery, hepatology, hepato-pancreato-biliary surgery, nutrition, pediatric surgery, and transplant surgery. In 2019, the Digestive Disease and Surgery Institute was ranked #2 nationally by U.S. News & World Report for gastroenterology and GI surgery.

Delaney was listed as a possible successor to Dr. Toby Cosgrove as the CEO of the Cleveland Clinic in 2017. In 2020, Delaney was appointed as CEO and President of Cleveland Clinic Florida region. The region includes five hospital, a state-of-the-art research center, and numerous outpatient centers located in five counties across Southeast Florida.

== Research ==
Delaney has published more than 400 manuscripts in scientific journals, 15 books, and many book chapters related to surgical education, colon and rectal cancer surgery, minimally invasive laparoscopic colorectal surgery, re-operative abdominal surgery, peri-operative care for intestinal surgery, and inflammatory bowel disease and diverticulitis. As of October 2025, Delaney has been cited 28,811 times and has a h-index of 96. He has been on the editorial board of many journals, including Diseases of the Colon & Rectum, World Journal of Surgery, The American Journal of Surgery, Techniques in Coloproctology, and Polish Journal of Surgery, and has acted as an invited reviewer for every major surgical journal. Delaney has delivered over 350 invited lectures internationally.

=== Clinical research ===
Delaney's clinical contributions include work in minimally invasive laparoscopic colorectal surgery to enhance recovery, of which he has demonstrated associated short and long-term cost-savings. His other work includes patient quality of life, surgical education, procedures for carcinomas of the colon and rectum, sphincter-saving surgery, re-operative abdominal surgery, Crohn's disease and ulcerative colitis, and colonoscopy.

Delaney has developed various enhanced recovery pathways after surgery since an initial publication by his team on "Fast-track" surgery in 2001, which when combined with less-invasive surgery, have cut hospital stays for colorectal resection to two and a half days on average.

=== Cost-efficiency research ===
Delaney has had a major focus on work relating to cost-efficiency and value in healthcare, as well as surgical quality, which led to his invention of an affordable quality metric called the HARM Score.

==== HARM Score ====
Delaney developed the HARM Score, standing for HospitAl stay, Readmission, and Mortality, to accurately measure patient outcomes and quality of care inexpensively, as an alternative for hospitals not participating in the foremost National Surgical Quality improvement Program (NSQIP) because of expense and complexity. Using routinely captured data, the HARM Score decreased administrative costs associated with quality care improvement programs, while being almost universally applicable regardless of the size of the hospital. The HARM score has since been assessed and validated by others on bariatric patients, prompting the creation of the BAR-HARM score.

== Innovation ==
=== Patents ===
Delaney holds five patents for medical devices, techniques, and processes.

- US patent 20080262511A1, Delaney, Conor P., "Anoscope for Inspection and/or Surgery", published 23 October 2008, issued 17 January 2012
- US application 20130339060A1, Delaney, Conor P. & Stulberg, Jonah, "Method and system for extraction and analysis of inpatient and outpatient encounters from one or more healthcare related information systems", published 19 December 2013
- US patent 9039224B2, Delaney, Conor P.; Swingle, Nicholas J.G. & Judson, Kaleigh E. et al., "Head-mounted pointing device", published 3 April 2014, issued 26 May 2015
- US application 20160092641A1, Delaney, Conor P. & Evans, James, "Facilitating clinically informed financial decisions that improve healthcare performance", published 31 March 2016
- US application 20170165420A1, Rose, Johnie & Delaney, Conor P., "Subcutaneous hydration system, method, and device", published 15 June 2017

=== Socrates Analytics, Inc. ===
In 2012, Delaney founded a software company called Socrates Analytics, Inc. to help hospitals and physicians collect and analyze hospital billing, administrative and operating room data. Socrates automated the collection of information stored across a number of data systems to allow hospitals to capture entire episodes of patient care, integrating disparate hospital administrative software systems to facilitate reporting on operational metrics. He created the venture while at UH Case Medical Center, seeking to find what factors truly drove cost in the operating room and were associated with readmissions within 30 days of discharge. Delaney was quoted saying, "Socrates gives hospitals the opportunity to interpret complex administrative data and view trends, outliers and variability in the process, so they can improve their efficiency and terms of care." Delaney recruited a former McKesson executive, Jim Evans, to be the company's Chief Executive Officer. Socrates attracted over $1.5 million in capital and established several national distribution partnerships.

== Honors and awards ==
In 2001, Delaney was chosen to deliver the 24th Millin Lecture and awarded the prestigious Millin Medal by Royal College of Surgeons Ireland, named in honor of Terence Millin, the late Irish surgeon. Delaney was recognized as the Jeffrey L. Ponsky MD Endowed Professor of Surgical Education at Case Western Reserve University in 2009, the inaugural Murdough Master Clinician in Colorectal Surgery in 2011, and the Victor W. Fazio MD Endowed Chair in Colorectal Surgery at the Cleveland Clinic in 2016.

Delaney is past President of the International Society of Laparoscopic Colorectal Surgery and the Midwest Surgical Association. In 2022, he was appointed President of the American Society of Colon and Rectal Surgeons and has previously received awards from the Association of Coloproctology of Great Britain and Ireland, as well as from colorectal societies in Australia, New Zealand, Mexico, Brazil, and across North America.

In September 2018, Delaney was invited to deliver the keynote address at the 43rd Sir Peter Freyer Memorial Lecture and Surgical Symposium in Galway, Ireland.

In December 2018, Delaney was awarded an Honorary Fellowship from the Royal College of Surgeons in Ireland. He was the second person to be awarded an Honorary Fellowship, the highest distinction the college has to offer, who had already received a Fellowship from the Royal College, for his work as a "leading international figure in the field of coloproctology."

Delaney is highlighted in the EPIC Museum of Irish Emigration in Dublin, Ireland, having "emigrated from Ireland and found success as a physician abroad."

== Personal life ==
Delaney's father, Dr. Peter V. Delaney, was a colorectal surgeon, fellow of the Royal College of Surgeons in Ireland, and founder of an annual fixture on the Irish surgical calendar, the Sylvester O'Halloran Perioperative Symposium and meeting. In the acknowledgement for his book, Delaney credits his father, Peter, "whose love of surgery and its ability to help others led [Conor] to this field."

== Books ==
- Victor W. Fazio, James M. Church, Conor P. Delaney (2005) Current Therapy in Colon and Rectal Surgery. Elsevier Mosby. 2nd edition. ISBN 1556644809
- Conor P. Delaney, Paul C. Neary, Alexander G. Heriot, Anthony J. Senagore (2006) Operative Techniques in Laparoscopic Colorectal Surgery. Lippincott Williams & Wilkins. ISBN 9788586703737
- Conor P. Delaney, Paul C. Neary, Alexander G. Heriot, Anthony J. Senagore (2009) Tecnicas Operatorias Em Cirurgia Colorretal Laparoscopica. Lippincott Williams & Wilkins. ISBN 9788586703737
- Conor P. Delaney (2013) Netter's Surgical Anatomy and Approaches. Elsevier Health Sciences. ISBN 9781437708332
- Wai Lun Law, Conor P. Delaney (2013) Single Incision Laparoscopic and Transanal Colorectal Surgery. Springer Science & Business Media. ISBN 1461489024
- Conor P. Delaney, Justin K. Lawrence, Bradley J. Champagne, Deborah S. Keller (2013) Operative Techniques in Laparoscopic Colorectal Surgery. Lippincott Williams & Wilkins. 2nd edition. ISBN 1451142781
- Liane S. Feldman, Conor P. Delaney, Olle Ljungqvist, Francesco Carli (2015) The SAGES / ERAS Society Manual of Enhanced Recovery Programs for Gastrointestinal Surgery. Springer. ISBN 3319203649
- Hitendra R. H. Patel, Tim Mould, Jean V. Joseph, Conor P. Delaney (2015) Pelvic Cancer Surgery. Springer. ISBN 9781447142577
- Conor P Delaney (2015) Anatomia Y Abordajes Quirurgicos de Netter. Elsevier. ISBN 9789588871479
- Victor W. Fazio, James M. Church, Conor P. Delaney, Ravi P Kiran (2016) Current Therapy in Colon and Rectal Surgery. Elsevier Health Sciences. 3rd edition. ISBN 9780323280921
- Conor P Delaney (2016) Netter Anatomia E Abordagens Cirurgicas. Elsevier. ISBN 9788535284102
- Scott R. Steele, James M. Church, Conor P. Delaney, Tracy L. Hull, Matthew F. Kalady (2019) Illustrated Tips in Colon and Rectal Surgery. Wolters Kluwer. ISBN 9781975108250
- Conor P. Delaney (2020) Netter's Surgical Anatomy and Approaches. Elsevier Health Sciences. 2nd edition ISBN 978-0-323-67346-4

== See also ==
- List of Case Western Reserve University people
- List of University College Dublin people
- Peter V. Delaney
