= Huntington Hospital =

Huntington Health
- Cedars-Sinai

Geography
- Location: 100 W. California Boulevard; Pasadena, California, United States
- Coordinates: 34°08′03″N 118°09′08″W

Organization
- Type: Community

Services
- Standards: American College of Surgeons; Joint Commission
- Emergency department: Level II Trauma Center
- Beds: 534

Helipads
- Helipad: FAA LID: CL14

History
- Founded: 1892

Links
- Website: http://www.huntingtonhealth.org
- Lists: Hospitals in California

Huntington Health, an Affiliate of Cedars-Sinai is a 534-bed, not-for-profit hospital in Pasadena, California.

In the 1930s Pasadena Hospital was awarded an amount of money from the estate of Henry Edwards Huntington, a Southern California businessman and booster, and as a result, the common name of the hospital was changed.

Huntington is home to the only level-II trauma center in the San Gabriel Valley.

== Overview ==
Huntington Health is a non-profit medical center, which provides medical care to the western San Gabriel Valley and nearby communities.

First established in 1983, the Huntington Hospital Center for Trauma Care is the only level II trauma center serving the San Gabriel Valley, and one of 13 trauma centers in Los Angeles County.

In the late 1980s, a new emergency department, along with a new maternity department were built and opened in 1991. Then, a new inpatient tower, known as the east tower opened in 1998, and the inpatient west tower was built and opened in 2008. A larger emergency department was opened in 2014.

In 2020, the hospital signed an agreement to join the Cedars-Sinai Health System.

== Accreditation ==
Fully accredited by the Joint Commission, Huntington Hospital has advanced certification as a Comprehensive Stroke Center and participates in the American College of Surgeons National Surgical Quality Improvement Program.

== Area covered for the paramedics ==
Huntington Hospital has area covered for the Paramedics:

- Los Angeles Fire Department – RA 35,
- Los Angeles County Fire Department – Squads 11 and 19
- Pasadena F.D. – RA 31, 32, 33, 34, and 36.
- South Pasadena F.D.

== See also ==
- Prime Healthcare Services
