= Novant Health =

- Type: Nonprofit health system
- Industry: Health care
- Predecessor: Carolina Medicorp, Presbyterian Health Services
- Founded: 1891; 135 years ago in Winston-Salem, North Carolina, United States
- Headquarters: 2085 Frontis Plaza Boulevard, Winston-Salem, North Carolina, United States
- Number of locations: 19 hospitals; 850+ outpatient locations; 30+ imaging centers; 720+ physician clinics; (2023)
- Area served: North Carolina, South Carolina
- Key people: Carl Armato (President, CEO); Frank Emory, Jr. (Chief Legal Officer); John Gizdic (Chief Administrative Officer); Sanjay Gupta (Chief Transformation Officer); Onyeka Nchege (Chief Information Officer); Denise Mihal (Chief Nursing Officer); Pam Oliver, M.D. (Physician Network President); Dean Swindle (President of Novant Health Enterprises)
- Services: Health care; Community service
- Revenue: Operating: $8.3 billion (2023)
- Operating income: Net: $460.8 million (2023)
- Number of employees: 40,000 (2023)
- Divisions: Physician Network; Heart & Vascular Institute; Oncology; Neuroscience; Orthopedics & Sports Medicine; Emergency & Trauma; Maternity & Neonatal; Pediatrics; Health Equities; Social Responsibility; MedQuest; Adept
- Website: www.novanthealth.org

Novant Health is a four-state integrated network of physician clinics, outpatient centers, and hospitals across the Southeast United States. Its network consists of more than 2,000 physicians and 40,000 employees at more than 850 locations, including 21 medical centers and hundreds of outpatient facilities and physician clinics. The organization was formed on July 1, 1997 by the merger of Carolina Medicorp of Winston-Salem, North Carolina and Presbyterian Health Services of Charlotte, North Carolina. Headquartered in Winston-Salem, North Carolina, Novant Health serves more than 7 million patients annually. In 2019, Novant Health was ranked #38 in Forbes' annual ranking of America's Best Employers for Diversity, #3 in Diversity MBA Magazine's annual ranking of Best Places to Work for Women & Diverse Managers, and #6 in North Carolina in Forbes' annual ranking of America's Best Employers by State.

== History ==
=== Mergers and re-branding ===
Novant Health announced a new brand in 2013 to bring a unifying business identity to its mix of more than 400 local brands. The new logo color aubergine represented "excellence" and "warmth."

=== Reorganization and layoffs ===
In July 2015, Novant Health concluded a months-long internal reorganization by terminating approximately 2% of its workforce, or about 400 employees. Despite the layoff announcement, officials said in a statement that the health system was "financially healthy" and a year-end report showed it generated a profit of $201.8 million the previous fiscal year. This was the largest system-wide layoff incident for the organization since its previous termination of 289 employees in May 2012, which caused picketing and protests associated with the Occupy movement.

=== St. Jude Children's Research Hospital affiliation ===
Novant Health announced a new affiliation with St. Jude Children's Research Hospital on April 21, 2015. The St. Jude affiliate clinic is located in Charlotte, North Carolina . The St. Jude Affiliate Clinic at Novant Health Hemby Children's Hospital provides specialized hematology and oncology care for pediatric patients in North and South Carolina.

=== Novant Health UVA Health System ===
Novant Health UVA Health System was formed January 1, 2016, as a new regional partnership between Novant Health and the University of Virginia Health System. This joint operating company was created through the merger of three regional hospitals: UVA Health System Culpeper Hospital, Novant Health Haymarket Medical Center and Novant Health Prince William Medical Center, as well as additional facilities from Novant Health including assisted living, outpatient cancer care, and ambulatory physician clinics. On July 1, 2021, UVA Health became the full owner of Novant Health UVA Health System and the hospitals in Culpeper, Manassas, and Haymarket.

=== Comprehensive Stroke Center certifications ===
On June 23, 2017, it was reported that Novant Health Presbyterian Medical Center had achieved a Comprehensive Stroke Center designation from the Joint Commission and American Heart Association, the first hospital in Charlotte, North Carolina with the designation and the second within the Novant Health system. Novant Health Forsyth Medical Center in Winston-Salem, North Carolina was previously designated as a Comprehensive Stroke Center in 2012, and has been re-certified three times. Comprehensive Stroke Center certification recognizes hospitals that meet standards to treat the most complex stroke cases, and is the highest level of stroke certification available.

=== Inner-market expansion ===
Novant Health Mint Hill Medical Center opened in October 2018 , the system's first new hospital campus in several years after more than a decade of planning and construction that was slowed down by the 2008 Great Recession. The Mint Hill, North Carolina facility opening was the highest profile example of Novant Health's strategy to expand services within its existing markets after several failed ventures into new markets, including the sale of Gaffney Medical Center in Gaffney, South Carolina, in 2014, the closure of Franklin Medical Center in Louisburg, North Carolina, in 2015, and the terminated acquisition of Memorial Health in Savannah, Georgia, in 2016.
Novant Health has also expanded capacity at its other North Carolina regional facilities including Clemmons, Kernersville, and Huntersville. In 2018 and 2019, Novant Health made several large real estate purchases for future growth including the former Sears store at Hanes Mall in Winston-Salem, North Carolina, a large medical office building in the SouthPark region of Charlotte, North Carolina, and the Hall Family Farm in the Ballantyne area of south Charlotte for a future medical center.

=== Novant Health Institute of Innovation & Artificial Intelligence (AI) ===
Novant Health announced the launch of the Novant Health Institute of Innovation & Artificial Intelligence (AI) in June 2019. The institute will "focus on the advanced technologies required to provide highly personalized care and accelerated solutions with actionable data and insights for preventative prediction, diagnosis and treatment to Novant Health's patients."

=== Controversies ===
In 2021, Novant faced controversy after firing 175 healthcare workers for not taking a mandated COVID-19 vaccine. At the time, it was one of the largest-ever mass terminations due to a vaccine mandate

In late October 2021, a jury awarded David Duvall, a Novant white male executive, $10 million for being fired due to his race and sex as a result of the company's goal of increasing diversity. The jury disagreed with Novant's claim that he was fired due to subpar performance.

== Hospitals ==
North Carolina

- Novant Health Ballantyne Medical Center
- Novant Health Betty H. Cameron Women's & Children's Hospital
- Novant Health Brunswick Medical Center
- Novant Health Charlotte Orthopedic Hospital
- Novant Health Clemmons Medical Center
- Novant Health Forsyth Medical Center
- Novant Health Hemby Children's Hospital
- Novant Health Huntersville Medical Center
- Novant Health Kernersville Medical Center
- Novant Health Matthews Medical Center
- Novant Health Medical Park Hospital
- Novant Health Mint Hill Medical Center
- Novant Health New Hanover Orthopedic Hospital
- Novant Health New Hanover Regional Medical Center
  - New Hanover Regional Medical Center is a hospital in Wilmington, North Carolina. It was established in 1967 as a public hospital, and it was the first hospital in the city to admit patients of all races. It was operated by New Hanover County. In February 2021 Novant acquired the hospital. The medical center campus includes a level-II trauma center, rehabilitation hospital, inpatient behavioral health hospital, cancer institute, surgical pavilion, neurosciences tower, and the region's air ambulance heliport.
- Novant Health Pender Medical Center
- Novant Health Presbyterian Medical Center
- Novant Health Rehabilitation Hospital, an affiliate of Encompass Health
- Novant Health Rowan Medical Center
- Novant Health Thomasville Medical Center

South Carolina

- Novant Health East Cooper Medical Center
- Novant Health Hilton Head Medical Center
- Novant Health Coastal Carolina Medical Center

=== Novant Health Presbyterian Medical Center ===
Novant Health Presbyterian Medical Center
- Novant Health

Geography
- Location: Charlotte, North Carolina, United States

Organization
- Care system: Private
- Type: General

Services
- Emergency department: Yes
- Beds: 654

History
- Founded: 1903

Links
- Website: www.novanthealth.org/locations/medical-centers/presbyterian-medical-center/
- Lists: Hospitals in North Carolina

Novant Health Presbyterian Medical Center is a 654-bed hospital in Charlotte, North Carolina. The hospital is accredited by the Joint Commission on Accreditation of Healthcare Organizations and received Magnet designation from the American Nurses Credentialing Center (ANCC).

Presbyterian Hospital was founded in 1903, when ten doctors from the North Carolina Medical College purchased the former Charlotte Private Hospital, and turned it over to the city's six Presbyterian churches to operate. The hospital operated out of leased properties during its early years. In 1915, the nearby Elizabeth College moved to Virginia, vacating its campus on Hawthorne Lane. The hospital acquired that property and in 1918 began operating at its current location. The first of several new buildings opened in 1940, and in 1980 the Elizabeth College buildings came down to make way for further expansion. It opened several satellite hospitals in Huntersville and Matthews, before merging with Carolina Medicorp of Winston-Salem in 1997. The combined company became known as Novant Health, and in 2013 announced the re-branding all of facilities under the Novant name.

==== Trauma Center ====
In June 2017, Novant Health Presbyterian Medical Center received approval from the North Carolina Office of Emergency Medical Services as a "practicing Level II trauma center." The hospital was previously designated as a Level III trauma center in 2016. To qualify for the full Level II designation, the hospital must care for 1,200 trauma patients in the year following the practicing designation and be evaluated on physician response times and patient outcomes. In 2026, the hospital was re-verified as a Level II trauma center by the American College of Surgeons.

==== Hemby Children's Hospital ====
Hemby Children's Hospital, located within Novant Health Presbyterian Medical Center, has a total of 109 beds including a 38-bed Level IV NICU, an 8-bed PICU, 20-bed adolescent behavioral health department, and a 43-bed general pediatric floor.

==== Awards and accolades ====
Presbyterian Medical Center has been named one of the 50 "Best Hospitals" in America by Becker's ASC Review.

In 2009, the American College of Surgeons National Surgical Quality Improvement Program (ACS NSQIP) recognized Presbyterian Hospital as one of 26 ACS NSQIP participating hospitals in the United States with exemplary outcomes for surgical patient care.

In 2010, it received a three-star rating for cardiac surgical care from the Society of Thoracic Surgeons.

=== Novant Health Rowan Medical Center ===
Novant Health Rowan Medical Center
- Novant Health
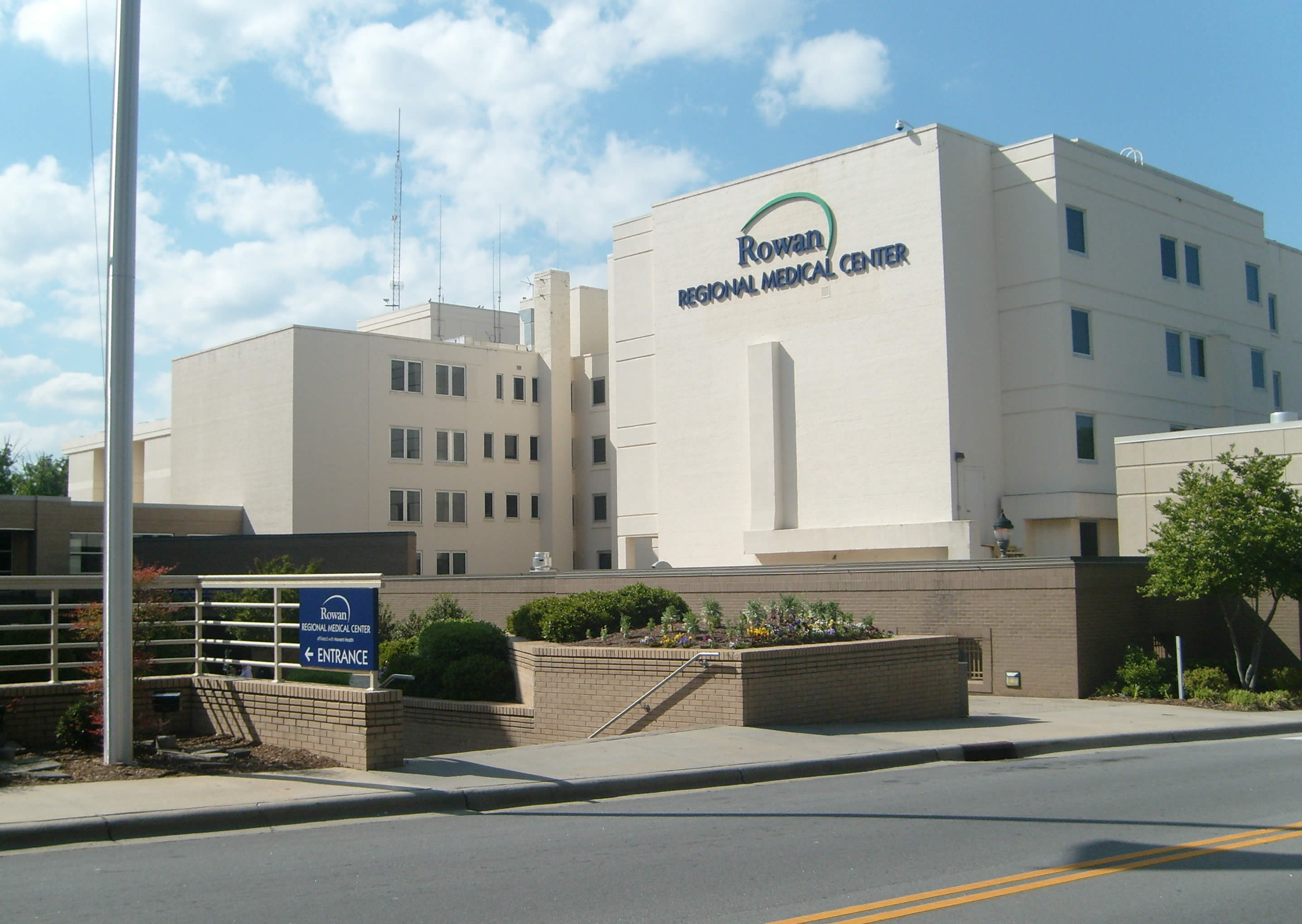
- Main visitor entrance on W. Henderson St.

Geography
- Location: Salisbury, North Carolina, United States

Organization
- Care system: Private
- Type: General

Services
- Emergency department: Yes
- Beds: 266

History
- Founded: 1936 as Rowan Memorial Hospital; 1995 as Rowan Regional Medical Center; 2008 as Novant Health Rowan Medical Center

Links
- Website: http://novanthealth.org/rowan
- Lists: Hospitals in North Carolina

Novant Health Rowan Medical Center, is a 266-bed hospital in Salisbury, North Carolina.

The hospital began as Whitehead Stocks Sanatorium with 40 beds. It first opened in its current location as Rowan Memorial Hospital on 1 August 1936. Since then, it has expanded several times. In 2008, it became part of Novant under its current name.

==== Awards/patient satisfaction ====
- Novant Health Rowan Medical Center is among only 28 hospitals nationwide to be awarded the 2011 Leadership Award for Clinical Excellence from VHA Inc.
- In 2011, it received re-certification as a primary stroke center from the Joint Commission.
