= Peter Delaney =

Peter Delaney may refer to:

- Peter Delaney (priest) (born 1939), Anglican priest from Great Britain
- Peter Delaney (rower) (born 1941), New Zealand rower
- Peter Delaney (collaborator), French-American volunteer in the Waffen-SS
- Peter V. Delaney (1935–2005), Irish colorectal surgeon
- Peter G. Delaney, road safety researcher

== See also ==
- Peter Delanoy (fl. 1680s–1690s), mayor of New York City
