= The Brothers Warbis =

British artist and illustrator twin brothers

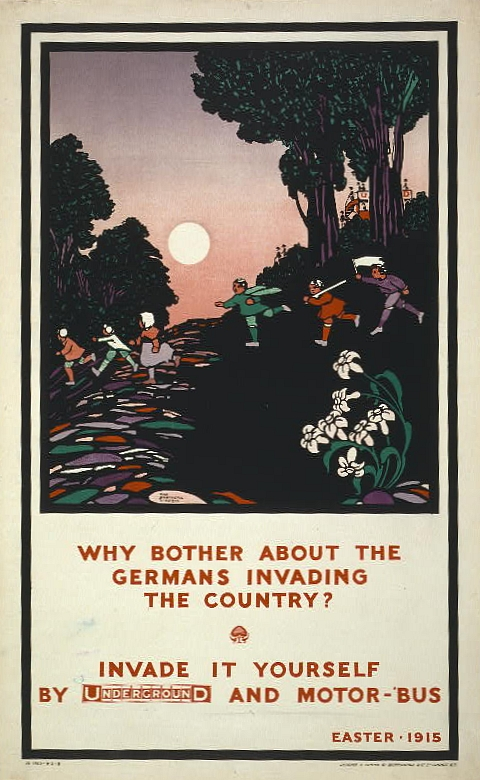
1915 London Underground First World War poster designed by the Brothers Warbis

The Brothers Warbis (June 1883 – 11 January 1976 and August 1946) were British artist and illustrator twin brothers Alfred Thomas Warbis and William Warbis.

They were born in Homerton, London, in June 1883, the eldest sons of a cooper, William Warbis.

In 1915, as "the brothers Warbis", they designed a poster for the Underground Electric Railway Company, entitled Why bother about the Germans invading the country.

In 1915, William married Letitia Martin, and they had four children. He suffered from poor health and died in August 1946.

Alfred died at Leicester General Hospital on 11 January 1976 aged 92, leaving his wife Mary and four children, and was buried in Barrow Cemetery, Barrow upon Soar.
