= Joseph Ó Ruanaidh =

Joseph Ó Ruanaidh (/ˈdʒoʊsɪf ˈruːni/ JOH-sif ROO-nee; (Note: Ó Ruanaidh is an Irish surname, commonly Anglicized as "Rooney.") born 1967) is a scientist and frequently cited author in the field of digital watermarking.

== Early life ==
He was born in London, England in 1967 and raised in Ballyfermot, Dublin. He attended the O'Connell School in Dublin.

He studied on his own, without supervision, to obtain the necessary qualifications to enter Trinity College Dublin in 1986. In 1988 he was awarded a Trinity College Foundation Scholarship, where he was also jointly awarded the St Patrick's Benevolent Society of Toronto prize for obtaining the highest overall marks in the scholarship examinations in the university that year. In 1990, he graduated with a degree in Engineering from Trinity College Dublin.

He was then awarded three scholarships to go to the University of Cambridge for his PhD where he studied the applications of Bayesian methods to digital signal processing. The work included novel algorithms for audio restoration as well as more general methods for analysing and detecting changes in data. His doctoral dissertation was published in book form by Springer Verlag.

== Early career ==
His postdoctoral work at Trinity College Dublin and at the University of Geneva concentrated on the then-emerging field of digital watermarking. He published seminal papers on image transform domain watermarks and, in particular, rotation and translation invariant watermarks based on the Fourier transform.

== Career ==
He moved to the United States in 1998, where he worked at Siemens Corporate Research in Princeton, New Jersey and where he played a key role in the development of the patented Siemens directional hearing aid.

In 2000, he joined Certus, an Internet start-up, dedicated to making Internet shopping safe.

In 2005 he joined GE Healthcare in Piscataway, New Jersey, where he published four patent applications on optical sectioning, Line Artifact Removal, Brightfield image segmentation and Cell Tracking in microscope images.

He was employed by DE Shaw group, a proprietary trading firm based in New York City, from February 2008 until February 2010 and by Apple Inc. from 2016 - 2020. He currently works as a principal algorithm engineer at Singular Genomics.

His research is well cited as evidenced in CiteSeer, ISI and Google Scholar.

== Awards and honours ==
- Anglo-Irish Science Exchange Scholarship
- Trinity College Cambridge Research Studentship
- IEE Leslie H Paddle Scholarship
- Trinity College Dublin Foundation Scholarship
- St Patrick's Benevolent Society of Toronto prize
- Victor W Graham Prize for Mathematics 1988

== Selected publications ==
- J.J.K. Ó Ruanaidh and W. Fitzgerald, Numerical Bayesian Methods Applied to Signal Processing, Springer, New York, 1996, ISBN 978-0-387-94629-0
- J.J.K. Ó Ruanaidh and T. Pun, "Rotation, scale and translation invariant spread spectrum digital image watermarking," Signal Processing, vol. 66, no. 5, pp. 303–317, May 1998.
- J.J.K. Ó Ruanaidh, R.R. McKay, Y. Zhang, M. Briggs, J. George and Z. Masoumi, "The application of Bayesian spectral analysis to optical sectioning using structured light imaging", Journal of Microscopy, Volume 232 Issue 1, Pages 177–185, Published Online: 25 Sep 2008.
