= Maria Parham - Franklin =

Franklin Medical Center
- Novant Health, LifePoint Health

Geography
- Location: Louisburg, North Carolina, United States
- Coordinates: 36.112853°N 78.293913°W

Organization
- Type: General

History
- Opened: 1951, September 2017 reopened
- Closed: October 16, 2015

Links
- Website: www.franklinregional.org
- Lists: Hospitals in North Carolina

Franklin Medical Center was a hospital in Louisburg, North Carolina that closed on October 16, 2015. Previously, it was part of the Novant Health organization. In September 2017, the Franklin County Board of Commissioners announced that they came to an agreement with Duke LifePoint to reopen the hospital as part of Maria Parham Health.

== Awards/patient satisfaction ==
- In 2011, Franklin Medical Center has been nationally recognized as a top-performing healthcare organization by the Health Research & Education Trust (HRET).
- In 2010, Franklin Medical Center was awarded a three-year term of national accreditation in both magnetic resonance imaging (MRI) and mammography as the result of a recent review by the American College of Radiology (ACR).
- In 2010, Franklin Medical Center's diabetes education program received the certificate of education recognition from the American Diabetes Association.
- In 2010, Franklin Medical Center was awarded the national laboratory accreditation from the College of American Pathologists (CAP), based on the results of a recent onsite inspection. This is Franklin Medical Center's fifth CAP Accreditation; their first was awarded in March 2002.
- In 2010, Franklin Medical Center's diabetes education program received the 2010 American Diabetes Association (ADA) Provider of the Year Award.
