= O'Connell School =

School in Dublin, Ireland

O'Connell Secondary School

Location
- North Richmond Street, Dublin 1, D01 Y4A9, Ireland; 53.3582°N 6.2507°W

Information
- Motto: Ciall agus neart (Sense and strength)
- Established: 1828; 198 years ago
- Principal: Liam M.Newell
- Gender: Male
- Enrollment: approx. 248
- Religious order: Edmund Rice Trustees
- Website: oconnellschool.ie

The O'Connell School is a secondary and primary school for boys located on North Richmond Street in Dublin, Ireland. The school, named in honour of the leader of Catholic Emancipation, Daniel O'Connell, is the oldest surviving Christian Brothers school in Dublin, having been first established in 1829. It is now under the trusteeship of the Edmund Rice Schools Trust.

The school offers the Junior Certificate and Leaving Certificate programmes.

== Notable staff and past pupils ==
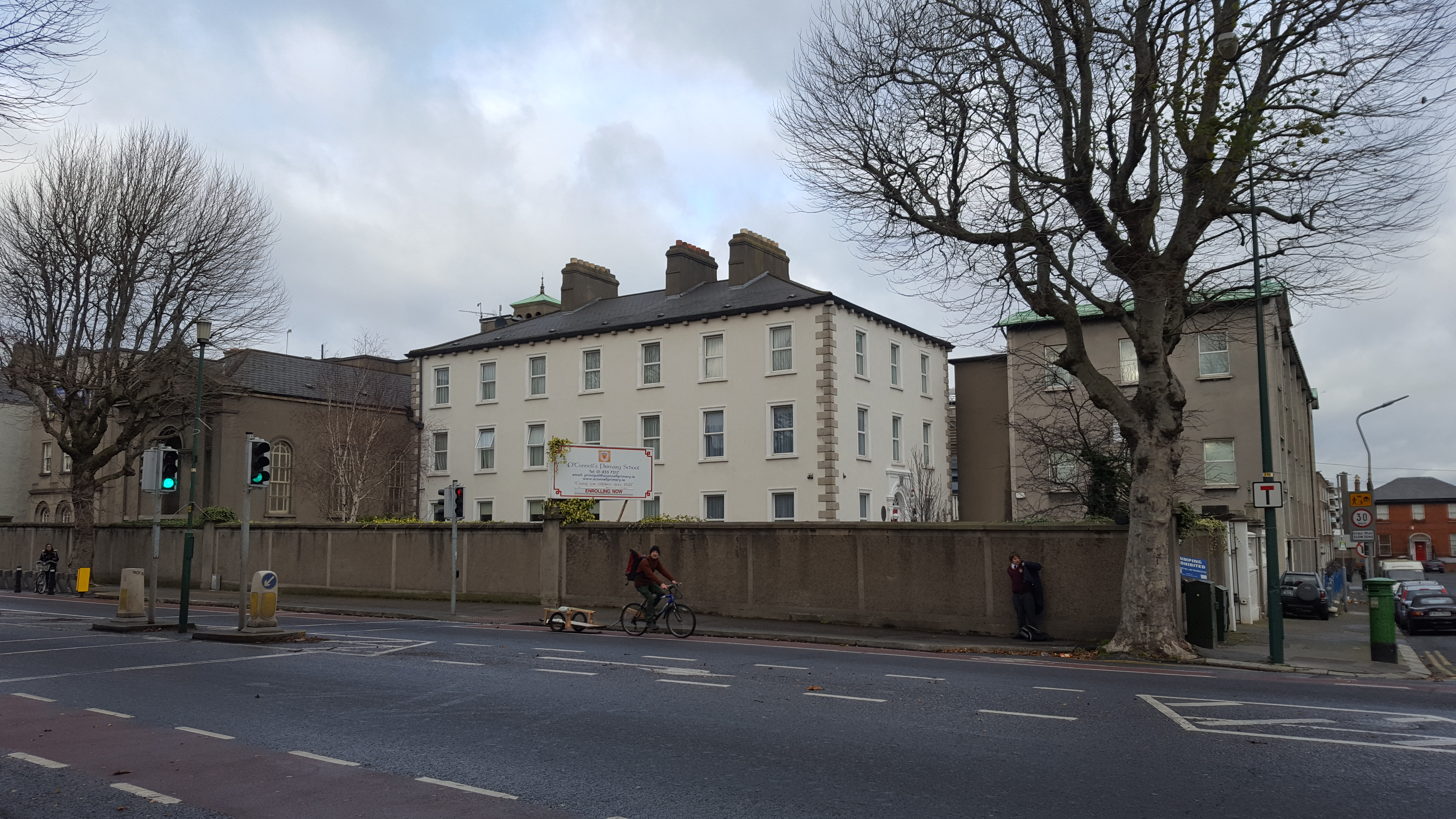
O'Connell's School from the North Circular Road

A number of notable people attended O'Connell's School. These have included:

=== Arts, journalism and entertainment ===
- Philip Chevron - musician, songwriter and member of the Pogues
- Paul Harrington - singer songwriter, Eurovision winner 1994
- Michael Holohan – composer, member and former chair of Aosdána.
- James Joyce – writer who briefly attended the school; the school is mentioned in the story "Araby" in Dubliners
- Pat Kenny – radio and television presenter
- Barry Keoghan – actor BAFTA Award
- Thomas Kinsella – poet and playwright
- Declan Masterson – multi-instrumentalist, composer, former Musical Director at Riverdance
- Colm Meaney – actor
- Michael O'Hehir – radio broadcaster and sports commentator
- Mícheál Ó Muircheartaigh – sports commentator who briefly taught at the O'Connell School
- Luke Kelly – lead singer of folk group The Dubliners
- Brendan Cauldwell - actor
- Butch Moore - lead singer of the Capitol Showband and first entry singer to represent Ireland in the Eurovision Song Contest

=== Business and philanthropy ===
- Bill Cullen – Irish businessman, philanthropist and star of The Apprentice

=== Science, medicine, technology, engineering and mathematics ===
- Peter V. Delaney – Irish colorectal surgeon
- John Hooper – first Director of the Statistics Branch of the Department of Industry and Commerce in Ireland
- William Mulholland – Irish-American dam civil engineer
- Joseph Ó Ruanaidh – scientist
- Professor Peter Gallagher- scientist

=== Politics ===
- John A. Costello – Taoiseach
- Seán Lemass – Taoiseach
- Seán T. O'Kelly – second President of Ireland
- Maurice Ahern – Politician and Lord Mayor of Dublin 2000–2001
- John Stafford – TD and former Lord Mayor of Dublin
- Nial Ring – Politician and Lord Mayor of Dublin 2018–2019
- Lorcan Sherlock – Politician and Lord Mayor of Dublin 1912–1915
- Brendan Rendall Bracken, 1st Viscount Bracken – British Minister of Information during the Second World War
- Ray Burke – Fianna Fáil politician
- Tom Kettle – Nationalist MP and Irish Volunteer who died in the First World War
- P. J. Mara – Fianna Fáil public affairs consultant
- Ernie O'Malley -Irish revolutionary and author

=== Religion ===
- Abraham Brownrigg - Bishop of Ossory (1884–1928)
- James Kavanagh – University College Dublin professor and bishop in the Archdiocese of Dublin

=== Sports ===
- Tom Farquharson - Ireland goalkeeper, dubbed 'the penalty king'
- Bertie Kerr – Ireland footballer, bloodstock agent
- Paddy Neville – cricketer
- Troy Parrott – Ireland footballer
- Ronnie Delaney – Olympic Gold Medallist
- Stephen Elliott - Ireland footballer
- Niall Brophy - athlete and rugby player
- Keith Treacy - Ireland footballer

=== Veterans ===
- Éamonn Ceannt – Irish Nationalist; one of the 1916 Easter Rising signatories
- Seán Heuston – a leading member of the 1916 Easter Rising
- Con Colbert - a member of the 1916 Easter Rising
- Frank Flood – IRA officer executed in 1921 during the War of Independence; one of The Forgotten Ten
- Paddy Finucane – World War II top-scoring fighter pilot ace in the RAF
