= John Hooper (Irish statistician) =

Irish statistician

John Hooper (26 January 1878 – 29 December 1930) was an Irish statistician who served as the first director of statistics for the Irish Free State, starting in 1923.

== Biography ==
John Hooper was born at 1 Anglesea Place, Cork city, son of politician and journalist John Hooper (1846–1897) and his wife Mary Jane Buckley, and went to school at the Christian Brothers in Cork and the O'Connell School in Dublin. In 1898, he got a BA (with first class honours) in mathematics from the Royal University of Ireland in Dublin. He joined the civil service, and worked for a while at the Office of the Postmaster-General in London.

In 1902, he returned to Dublin and joined the Department of Agriculture and Technical Instruction for Ireland (DATII), specifically the Statistics and Intelligence Branch. By 1917, he had risen to the rank of superintendent of this branch, and in 1920 he presented two papers at the inaugural Conference of British Empire Statisticians in London.

A few years later, the provisional government of the Free State combined DATII and the Department of the Ministry of Labour to form the new Department of Industry and Commerce. Thus, in 1923, Hooper became the first Director of Statistics in the country by being appointed head of the Statistics Branch of this new department. In this role, he led the country's statistical initiatives in its early years, but he died of pneumonia in 1930 at the age of 52.

== Honors and awards ==
Just before he died in 1930 he was elected as a member of the prestigious International Statistical Institute (ISI). There had been plans for him to receive an honorary Doctor of Economical Science from the National University of Ireland in recognition of his leadership and service. A medal for school children is awarded each year in his honour by the Central Statistics Office, based on a poster competition.
