= Peter V. Delaney =

Irish colorectal surgeon

- Born: Peter Vincent Delaney; 26 September 1936; Dublin, Ireland
- Died: 29 May 2002 (aged 65); Dublin, Ireland
- Education: University College Dublin (MB); University College Dublin (BSc); University College Dublin (M.Ch.)
- Occupation: Surgeon
- Children: Conor P. Delaney, Miriam Delaney, Barbara Kennedy, Fiona Brennan, Deirdre McKinley.

Peter Vincent Delaney MB, BSc, MCh, FRCSI (26 September 1936 – 29 May 2002) was an Irish colorectal surgeon. He founded the Sylvester O'Halloran Perioperative Symposium and Meeting, a fixture of the Irish surgical calendar, and received the President's Medal from the University of Limerick.

== Education ==
Delaney attended the O'Connell School in Dublin. In 1964, he earned an M.B., B.Ch., B.A.O. from University College Dublin. He completed his internship at the Mater Misericordiae Hospital between 1964 and 1965. In 1966, he worked as a Demonstrator in Anatomy at the University College Dublin and earned a B.Sc. in Anatomy.

From 1966 to 1968, Delaney was a Senior House Officer in Surgery at the Mater Hospital and was named a Fellow of the Royal College of Surgeons in Ireland in 1968, after which he served as Registrar in Surgery at the Mater Hospital between 1968 and 1969.

In 1969, Delaney moved to England to work as Registrar in General Surgery at Leicester General Hospital until 1971, when he earned his M.Ch. He then became R.S.O. at St. Mark's Hospital in London and completed a two-year fellowship rotation in colorectal surgery under Alan Parks, Ian Todd, Peter Hawley, and John Percy Lockhart-Mummery, which he finished in 1973. After his two years in London, he moved back to Ireland in 1973 to complete his training as Senior Registrar in surgery at the Mater Hospital.

== Career ==
Delaney received his first appointment as locum consultant at the Mater Hospital in 1974 and Castlebar General Hospital between 1974 and 1975. He also served as a lecturer in surgery at Trinity College Dublin between 1975 and 1979.

In 1979, Delaney became a consultant general and colorectal surgeon at Limerick University Hospital and professor of surgical science. He was also a clinical lecturer in the Department of Surgery at the University College Cork. Delaney was one of the earliest Irish surgeons involved in laparoscopy in the late 1980s. Over his career, he published 42 scientific manuscripts and has been cited 475 times on topics related to colorectal surgery, Crohn's disease, and early recovery after minimally invasive surgery.

Delaney served on the council of the Royal College of Surgeons in Ireland from 1985 to 1997. He also served as one of the first directors of the Mid-Western Hospitals Development Trust, incorporated in May 1986, along with Anthony Thomas Dempsey, Brendan Anthony McMahon, Patrick Mulcair, and Thomas Henry Peirce.

In 1992, Delaney founded the Sylvester O'Halloran Perioperative Symposium and Meeting with Professor Eamonn McQuaid from the University of Limerick. Since its founding, the Symposium has grown to be a fixture of the Irish surgical calendar and has evolved to comprise general, vascular, colorectal, breast/endocrine, orthopaedic, ENT, and plastic surgery sessions, as well as multidisciplinary, plenary, and practical hand-on surgical educational sessions.

Delaney received the University of Limerick's President's Medal, one of the University's highest and most special honors.

== Personal life ==
His children include Conor P. Delaney, an Irish-American colorectal surgeon, Chairman of the Digestive Disease and Surgery Institute at the Cleveland Clinic, and Fellow and Honorary Fellow of the Royal College of Surgeons in Ireland.
