= University Hospitals of Leicester NHS Trust =

NHS hospital trust

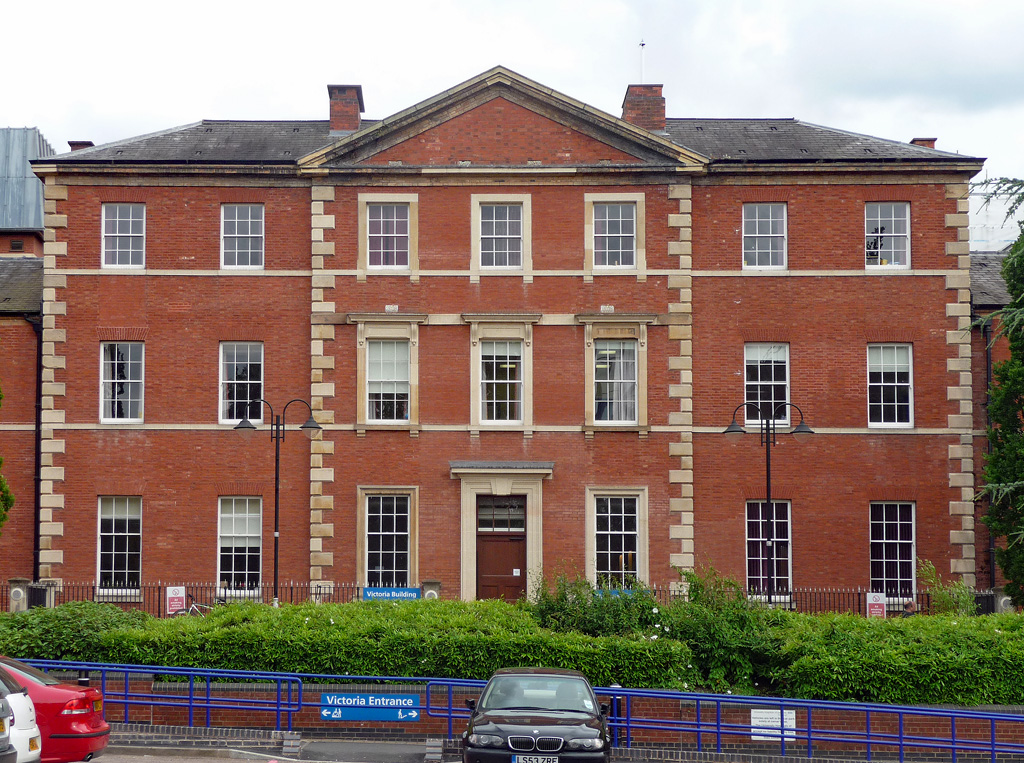
- Leicester Royal Infirmary
- Type: NHS hospital trust
- Hospitals: Leicester Royal Infirmary; Glenfield Hospital; Leicester General Hospital
- Website: www.leicestershospitals.nhs.uk

University Hospitals of Leicester NHS Trust was created in April 2000 with the merger of the Leicester General Hospital, Glenfield Hospital and Leicester Royal Infirmary.

At that time it was one of the six biggest NHS trusts in England with a budget of over £600 million per annum and 12,000 staff. It treats in excess of 1 million patients per annum, delivers 10,000 babies a year and provides the largest emergency service (admissions and ED attendances). It has one of the best records in the country for cardiac care and also specialises in kidney disease, cancer and vascular surgery. Its research programmes in cardio-vascular science, stroke medicine and diabetes are internationally renowned.

It was originally led by Philip Hammersley CBE (Chairman, 2000–06), Dr Peter Reading (Chief Executive, 2000–07) and Dr Allan Cole (Medical Director, 2000–10). In May 2008 new chief executive, Malcolm Lowe-Lauri, joined the trust from Kings College Hospital. John ADLER has been CEO since 2013.

== Services ==
University Hospitals of Leicester NHS Trust provide services across their three sites with Accident and Emergency facilities based at the Royal Infirmary site.

Specialist coronary care and respiratory disease facilities are currently based at Glenfield Hospital, with a strong international reputation for medical research in cardiac and respiratory health. Leicester General Hospital specialise in renal care, orthopaedics, diabetes research, urology, maternity, brain injuries, and treatment for disabled children.

== Facilities ==
In 2015, Interserve was awarded a £300m contract to manage trust buildings over 7 years but the deal was ended in April 2016 after it was issued with a warning over poor cleaning standards. In March 2018 the trust agreed to create a wholly owned subsidiary to run its facilities management services which will increase salaries, spend £2m on cleaning and recruit more maintenance staff. About 1700 staff will be affected and about 200 will get a pay rise.

== Charitable Support ==
The University Hospitals of Leicester NHS Trust is supported by multiple charitable organisations including:

- Leicester Hospitals Charity
- Heart Link
- Keep the Beat

These charities provide additional funding and support to the NHS, patients and relatives.

== Performance ==
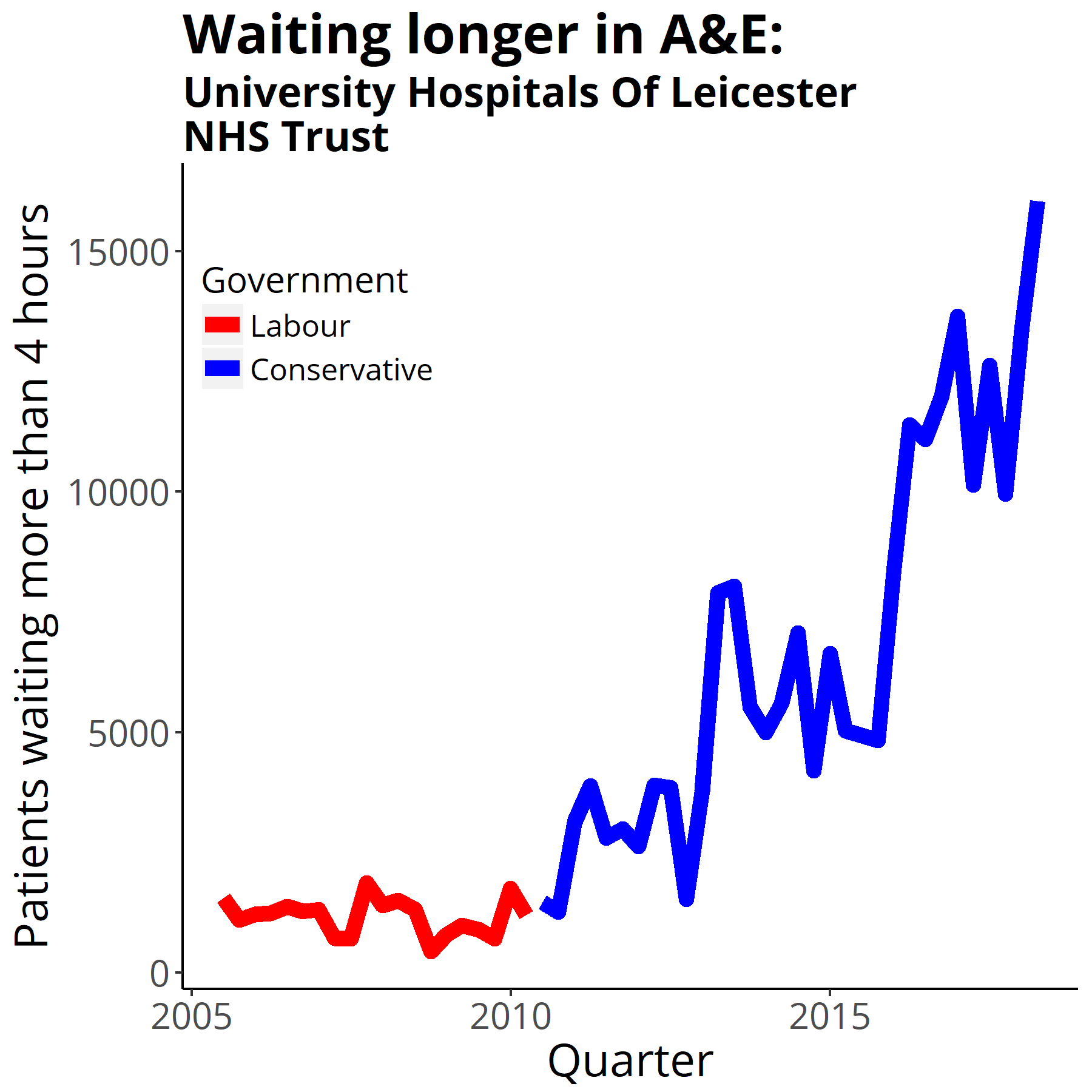
Four-hour target in the emergency department quarterly figures from NHS England Data from https://www.england.nhs.uk/statistics/statistical-work-areas/ae-waiting-times-and-activity/

University Hospitals of Leicester achieved the highest possible ranking for service quality from the Healthcare Commission five years running - '3 Stars' in 2003/04 and 2004/05 followed by 'Excellent' from 2005/06 to 2007/08. This was the best five year record of any multi-specialty teaching trust in England, and followed a remarkable turnaround from zero stars in 2002/03 (associated with an administrative error relating to waiting lists for minor surgery), which the Leicester Mercury described as 'zeros to heroes'. In 2007/08, the Trust maintained its excellent rating for Quality of Service issued by the Healthcare Commission. In 2008/09 the rating slipped to 'Good'.

In October 2013 as a result of the Keogh Review the Trust was put into the highest risk category by the Care Quality Commission.

The Trust predicted a deficit of £39.8m in 2013-14, the largest of any in England.

The emergency department at Leicester Royal Infirmary is the busiest single unit in the country. It covers a population of 1.4 million. From 2014 to 2015 admissions rose by 12%. The trust has reduced its average length of stay by 7%, which has, in part, compensated for the increased admissions. Performance on the target of seeing 95% of people who attend accident and emergency departments within four hours has improved since January 2015. When it was inspected by the Care Quality Commission in November 2015 it was found to be chaotic and unsafe, with the nurse in charge of insufficient seniority. In May 2017 the trust declared a critical incident after patients faced extreme delays in its new £48m emergency department and bed occupancy at Leicester Royal Infirmary was running at 97%. It has reached a record of 805 attendances in a single day.

In October 2017 the trust had 500 nursing vacancies. More than half of the trust’s 440 nurses from EU countries had left. It was proposed to replace some registered nurse posts with a nursing associate.

In January 2018 18% of patients needing admission from A&E had to wait more than four hours for a bed - an improvement in the Trust's performance against other NHS hospitals compared with previous years. In November 2018 it was reported that the trust was having severe problems running the Intensive Care Unit at Leicester General Hospital because of problems with staff recruitment and retention. It proposed to move the unit to an 11 bed extension at Glenfield Hospital and open a six bed ICU annex at Leicester Royal Infirmary.

A number of cancer patients had surgery cancelled due to lack of intensive care beds. Dr Moira Fraser-Pearce of Macmillan Cancer Support said, “It is unacceptable that some people living with cancer are experiencing last-minute cancellations for surgery for nonclinical reasons. These people will have prepared both practically and emotionally for their operation, and this news will cause additional stress and upset at an already difficult time. We worry that these cancellations in Leicester are just one example of similar challenges faced by NHS trusts across the country, and symptomatic of a system which is underfunded and understaffed. This must not become the ‘new normal’.”

== Criticism ==
Staff were banned from drinking tea or coffee in outpatient clinic reception areas in October 2014 by Michelle Scowen, matron for clinical support and imaging because it gave the wrong impression to staff and the public that clinic staff were not working as hard as they might be.
