= Leicester General Hospital =

- University Hospitals of Leicester NHS Trust
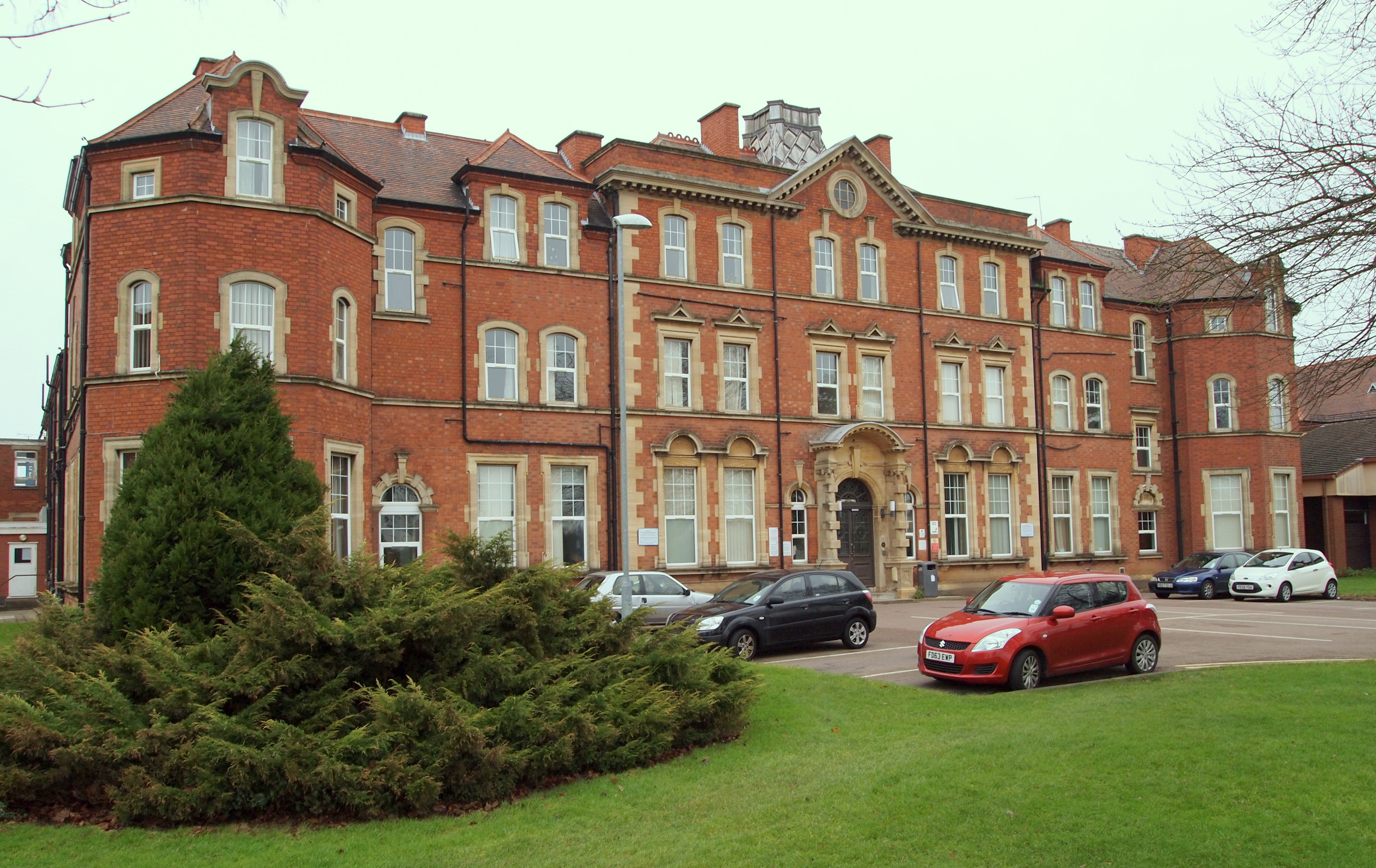
- Leicester General Hospital

- Location in Leicestershire

Geography
- Location: Gwendolen Road, Leicester, England, United Kingdom
- Coordinates: 52°37′48″N 1°05′01″W

Organisation
- Care system: Public NHS
- Type: General
- Affiliated university: Leicester University

Services
- Emergency department: No Accident & Emergency
- Beds: 430

History
- Founded: 1905

Links
- Website: Leicester General Hospital
- Lists: Hospitals in England

Leicester General Hospital (LGH) is a National Health Service hospital located in the suburb of Evington, about three miles east of Leicester City Centre, and is a part of University Hospitals of Leicester NHS Trust. It has approximately 430 beds. The hospital is the largest employer in the area.

== History ==
=== Poor law infirmary ===
The 62-acre site between Crown Hills and Evington village was purchased for £6,920 in 1902, with construction of the hospital beginning on 2 April 1903. The building, designed by architects Giles, Gough and Trollope, was completed at a cost of £79,575, and was officially opened as the North Evington Poor Law Infirmary on 28 September 1905 by the Chairman of the Leicester Board of Guardians. A large central block contained offices, staff rooms, kitchens, and operating theatres, with separate male and female wards on either side, each with eight 24-bed wards, all connected by a central corridor 194 yards (177 m) long, claimed to be the longest in England. There were also separate blocks for "imbeciles, epileptics and short-term lunatics", providing a total of 512 beds. Known locally as the "Palace on the Hill", in 1914 it was renamed North Evington Infirmary.

=== First World War ===
On 6 April 1915, during the First World War, the Infirmary was taken over by the Army. Under the command of Captain W. M. Holmes, RAMC, it became the North Evington War Hospital, part of the 5th Northern General Hospital. The 5th NGH was based at the former Leicestershire & Rutland County Asylum (now the University of Leicester), but eventually extended to over 60 sites in Leicestershire, Lincolnshire, Derbyshire and Nottinghamshire, including local and cottage hospitals, as well as private homes. The War Hospital was staffed by both Royal Army Medical Corps and civilian doctors, locally recruited nurses and VADs, as well as some of the original civilian staff. By August 1916 the number of beds had been increased to 722, and then to 850 by October 1917, and finally to 1,010 in April 1918, by erecting wooden floored marquees in the grounds. On 7 May 1919 the hospital was deemed surplus to military requirements and was gradually closed down, being handed back to the custody of the Board of Guardians on 8 August, having treated 20,456 wounded servicemen.

=== General hospital ===
In 1930 the hospital was again renamed becoming the City General Hospital. During the Second World War it had wards for both military and civilian patients. With the creation of the National Health Service in 1948 it was renamed Leicester General Hospital, and was part of the Sheffield regional hospital board, which was reorganised as the Trent Regional Health Authority in 1974.

In 1950, Leicester General Hospital began to admit emergency cases every third day, and in 1954 opened its first maternity ward.

In 1974, "Radio Gwendolen", the LGH's hospital radio service, began broadcasting, and the first WRVS shop, and also a new rehabilitation department offering physiotherapy, hydrotherapy and occupational therapy opened.

In 1975, LGH became a teaching hospital, and carried out its first kidney transplant on 12 March.

On 1 April 1993, the LGH was granted Trust status, and a clinical education centre was opened in 1994.

In 2000 Leicester General Hospital, Glenfield Hospital and the Royal Infirmary merged to form the University Hospitals of Leicester NHS Trust. As of 2015 Leicester General Hospital specialised in renal care, orthopaedics, diabetes research, urology, maternity, brain injuries, and treatment for disabled children.

==== Closing of ITU beds ====
In July 2018 UHL supported by the Department of Health released 230 pages of plans, which would see all but one of the twelve top-level intensive care beds transferred to either Glenfield Hospital or the Leicester Royal Infirmary as part of the Sustainability and Transformation Plan (STP). The Leicester Mercury patients panel criticised the proposal both because of the lack of public consultation before presentation and its effect on inhibiting more complex surgery which require ICU beds. In August, a De Montfort University report also criticised lack of consultation in the plan which was unchanged since 2015 when it was rushed through apparently because of its urgency.

== See also ==
- List of hospitals in England
