= Diseases of the Colon & Rectum =

- Discipline: Colorectal surgery, gastroenterology
- Language: English
- Edited by: Susan Galandiuk

Publication details
- History: 1958-present
- Publisher: Lippincott Williams & Wilkins
- Frequency: Monthly
- Impact factor: 3.519 (2016)

Standard abbreviations
- ISO 4: Dis. Colon Rectum

Indexing
- CODEN: DICRAG
- ISSN: 0012-3706 (print); 1530-0358 (web)
- LCCN: sn78005687
- OCLC no.: 01566768

Links
- Journal homepage; Online access; Online archive

Diseases of the Colon & Rectum is a monthly peer-reviewed medical journal covering colorectal surgery. It was established in 1958 and is published by Lippincott Williams and Wilkins on behalf of the American Society of Colon and Rectal Surgeons, of which it is the official journal. The editor-in-chief is Susan Galandiuk (University of Louisville). According to the Journal Citation Reports, the journal has a 2016 impact factor of 3.519.
