= Leicester Royal Infirmary =

- University Hospitals of Leicester NHS Trust
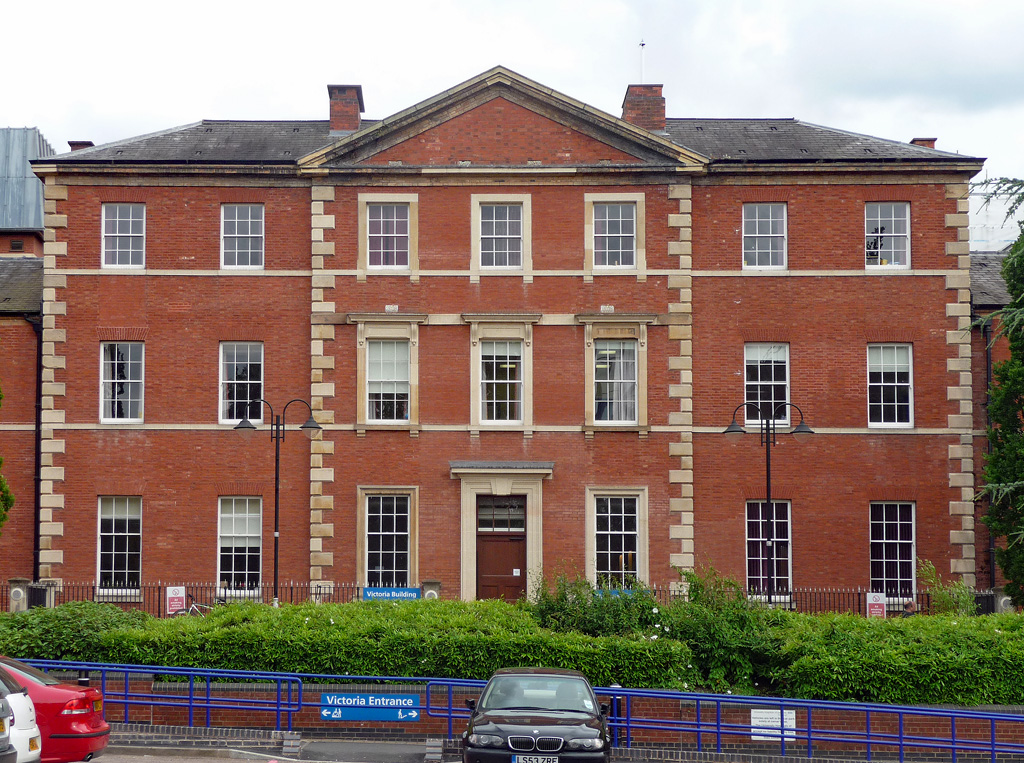
- Leicester Royal Infirmary

- Shown in Leicestershire

Geography
- Location: Infirmary Square, Leicester, England, United Kingdom
- Coordinates: 52.6274°N 1.1365°W

Organisation
- Care system: Public NHS
- Type: Teaching
- Affiliated university: Leicester University

Services
- Emergency department: Yes, Accident and Emergency
- Beds: 890

History
- Founded: 1771

Links
- Website: www.leicestershospitals.nhs.uk
- Lists: Hospitals in England

The Leicester Royal Infirmary (LRI) is a National Health Service teaching hospital in Leicester, England. It is located to the south-west of the city centre. It has an accident and emergency department, women's hospital, paediatrics, oncology (including radiotherapy) and other specialisms. The infirmary is the largest of the three Leicester hospitals managed by the University Hospitals of Leicester NHS Trust. Parts of Leicester Medical School are based on the site.

== History ==
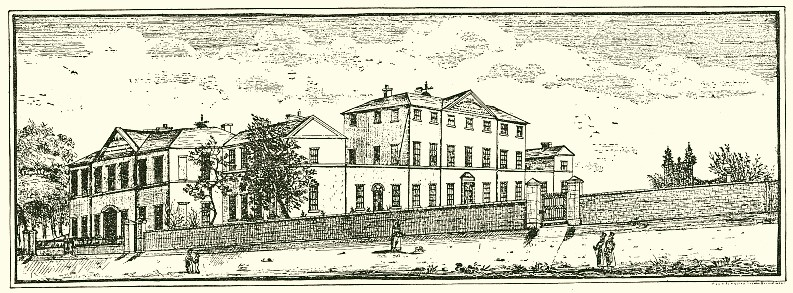
Leicester Infirmary & Fever House from the north-east by John Hackett 1825

The hospital was founded by Reverend William Watts as the Leicester Infirmary with 40 beds in 1771. Patients were forced to pay a deposit when they went in; if they went home, the money was repaid; if they died their deposit would be spent on burying them. When first opened, there was no running water, but it did have its own brewery, from which beer was used to treat the patients. By 1808, the infirmary had expanded by 20 beds, to a total of 60 beds.

A fever house opened at the infirmary in 1820 and nurses were first trained there in 1870. St Luke's Chapel, which benefited from extensive stained glass windows and memorials, was built in 1887. (Note: The chapel was demolished to make way for the new accident and emergency department in 2015)

The facility became Leicester Infirmary and Children's Hospital in 1911 and Leicester Royal Infirmary and Children's Hospital in 1914 before it joined the National Health Service in 1948.

The Windsor building was opened by the Queen in December 1993 and a new accident and emergency department was opened by the Princess Royal in March 2018.

Dr. Hadiza Bawa-Garba, a junior doctor at the Infirmary, was convicted of manslaughter for her part in the death of a 6-year-old boy from sepsis and received a suspended prison sentence in 2015. Although the General Medical Council ruled in January 2018 that she be struck off the medical register, the Court of Appeal decided in August 2018 that she should be re-instated.

A congenital heart centre opened at the Kensington Building at the Leicester Royal Infirmary in August 2021. This unit, which was transferred from Glenfield Hospital with support from Pick Everard, forms part of the East Midlands Congenital Heart Network.

The Infirmary is the home of the East Midlands Forensic Pathology Unit, which provides the Home Office registered forensic pathology services to the police forces of Derbyshire, Leicestershire (and Rutland), Lincolnshire, Nottinghamshire and Northamptonshire.

== Notable staff ==
- Mildred Hughes, matron of Leicester Royal Infirmary from 1929 to 1946, was President of the Royal College of Nursing from 1944 to 1946. A stained glass window dedicated to her memory was in the hospital chapel, but was moved to the hospital library.

== See also ==
- List of hospitals in England
