= Glenfield Hospital =

Coordinates: 52°39′16.6″N 1°10′44.3″W

- University Hospitals of Leicester NHS Trust
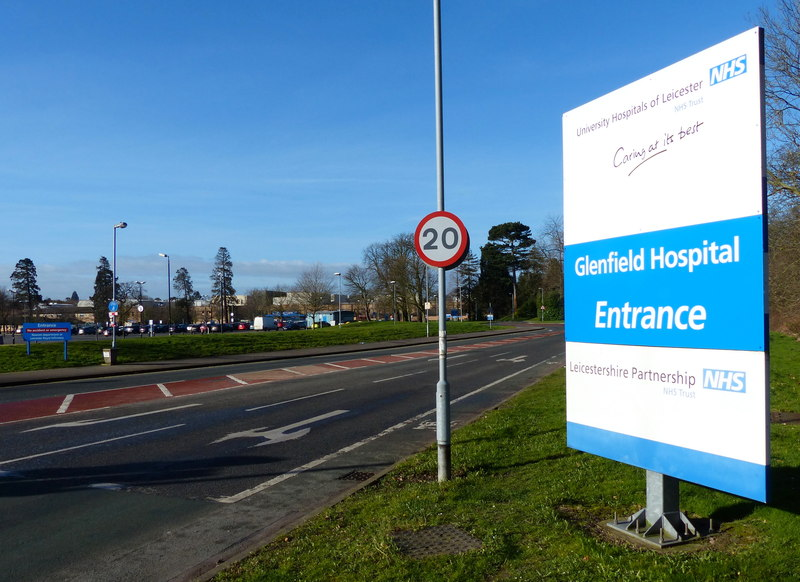
- Entrance to Glenfield Hospital

Geography
- Location: Leicester, Leicestershire, England, United Kingdom

Organisation
- Care system: Public NHS
- Type: Specialist
- Affiliated university: University of Leicester

Services
- Emergency department: No Accident & Emergency
- Beds: c.415
- Speciality: Heart disease, Lung cancer and Breast care

History
- Founded: 1984

Links
- Lists: Hospitals in England

Glenfield Hospital, formally known as Glenfield General Hospital, is situated near Glenfield, on the outskirts of Leicester. It is one of England's main hospitals for coronary care and respiratory diseases. It is a tertiary referral university teaching hospital, with a strong international reputation for medical research in cardiac and respiratory health. It is managed by the University Hospitals of Leicester NHS Trust.

== History ==
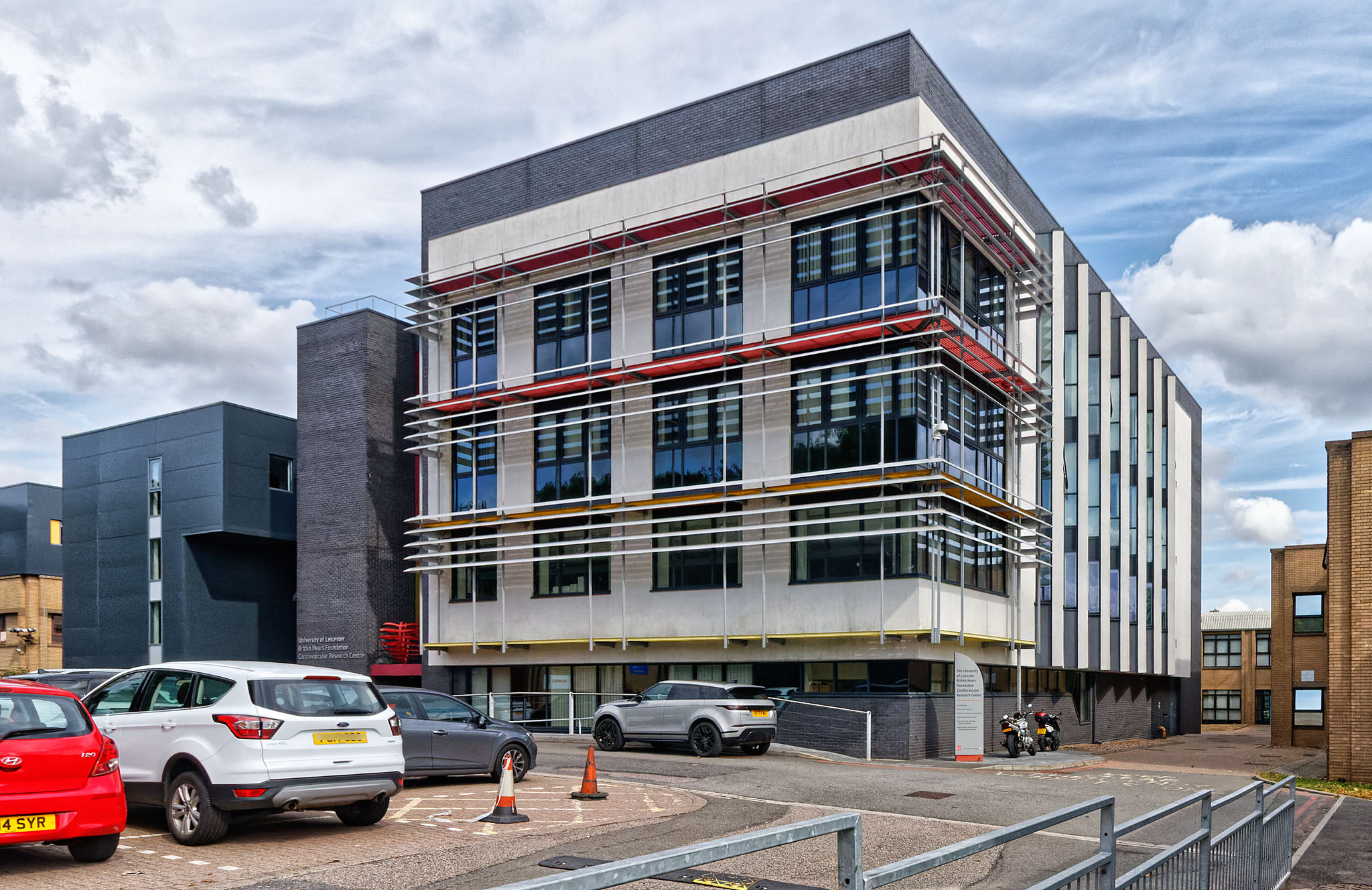
Cardiovascular Research Centre, Glenfield Hospital, Leicester

Glenfield Hospital is a modern hospital that was built in several phases the first phase of which was completed in October 1984. A formal opening ceremony was conducted by the Duchess of Kent in March 1986. A second phase to the hospital followed in 1989.

In December 2017, surgeons announced successful surgery on a baby girl born with her heart and part of her stomach growing externally. The treatment, which was carried out by a team of fifty, required three operations and the child is believed to be the "first baby in UK to survive with the extremely rare condition."

== East Midlands Congenital Heart Centre ==
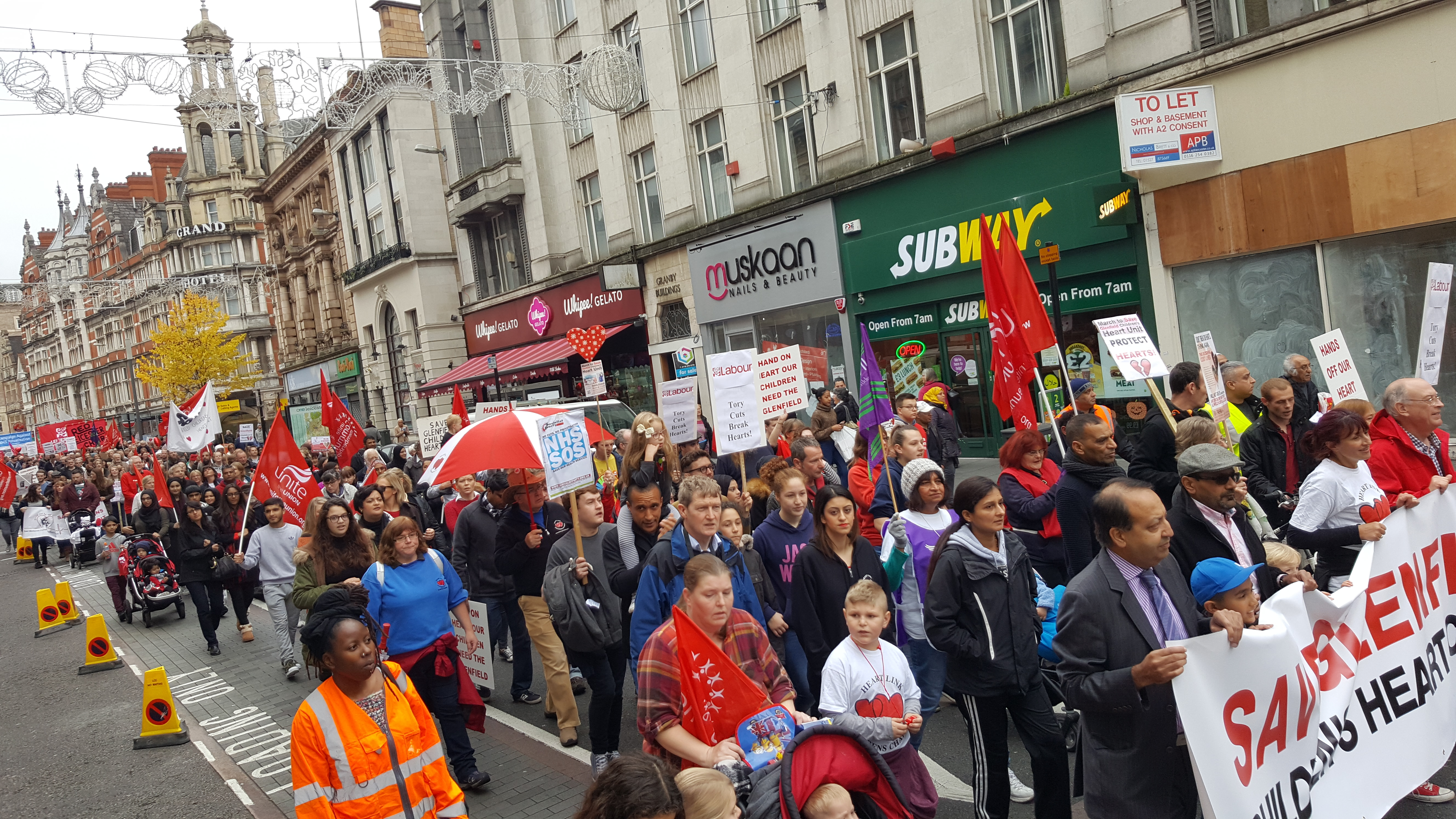
March through Leicester to save Glenfield Hospital's Children's heart unit, October 2016

In July 2012 it was announced that the East Midlands Congenital Heart Centre which served 5 million people and treated 230 children and 70 adults a year, would close to focus surgical expertise in fewer locations. The unit would however continue to provide diagnosis and non-surgical treatment. The unit had the largest ECMO unit in the UK and had been in operation for 20 years and a petition to save it attracted 100,000 signatures. In a letter to Andrew Lansley, ECMO expert Kenneth Palmer of the Karolinska University Hospital in Stockholm warned that about 50 babies and children will die over a five-year period if treatment moved to Birmingham. Palmer said that Leicester and Stockholm were world-leading ECMO centres with survival rates about 10% to 20% higher than the normal rate elsewhere.

In August 2012, it was announced that the hospital had carried out the world's first percutaneous coronary intervention procedure on a two-year-old child. The child had been born with hypoplastic left heart syndrome, a deformed left heart and had had two heart operations before his first birthday. A life-threatening clot had formed in the heart and was successfully removed drawing on the combined experience of paediatric and adult interventional cardiologists. The combined expertise may not be available in alternate facilities if Glenfield children's cardiac care unit closes. Campaigners in Leeds won a legal challenge criticising the fairness and legality of the review process in March 2013 and the plans were suspended in June "as the decision was based on a flawed analysis."

In July 2015, NHS England announced that following a "conclusive, open and transparent and rigorous" review, the heart unit would move to a new paediatric unit at the Leicester Royal Infirmary. The unit would employ 4 surgeons and take more cases becoming operational by April 2016. A year later, the hospital was told it had failed newly imposed congenital heart surgery standards and would close. Liz Kendall claimed that the unit was one of the "best performing surgical centres" in England and the decision wasn't justified – a view shared by both John Adler, the chief executive of University Hospitals of Leicester NHS Trust and Leicestershire County Council. According to the unit's former head, Professor Giles Peek, the hospital supported every other hospital in the region and its closure could seriously damage paediatric services. According to the trust website, its Extracorporeal membrane oxygenation facility, the largest of 5 in the UK, is the largest in Europe and one of the busiest in the world. It first provided treatment in 1989.
In September 2016, 28,000 people signed a new petition in England to keep the unit open. Adler noted that interest in the hospital's work went far beyond Leicestershire and the Leicester Mercury reported signatures from Orkney and Shetland. According to NHS England, the hospital hadn't met the required target of 125 operations per year for each of its 3 surgeons.
On 29 October hundreds of people marched to protest about its proposed April 2017 closure with Adler reiterating that clinical outcomes were "amongst the best in the country" though NHS England said it wouldn't meet the mininimum number of operations required by the new standards. The Leicester Mercury reported that more than 1000 people took part, most of them with family stories to tell. The organisers hope to get sufficient signatures for a debate in Parliament.

In November 2017, an NHS England board meeting in London conditionally agreed to continue the unit's work provided it moves to the Leicester Royal Infirmary and the unit's workload is increased as promised up to 2021.
