= National Surgical Quality Improvement Program =

Coordinates: 41°53′37″N 87°37′21″W

The American College of Surgeons National Surgical Quality Improvement Program (ACS NSQIP) was started in the American Veterans Health Administration (VHA). In the mid-1980s the VHA was criticized for their high operative mortality. To that end, Congress passed Public Law 99-166 in December 1985 which mandated the VHA to report their outcomes in comparison to national averages and the information must be risk-adjusted to account for the severity of illness of the VHA surgical patient population. In 1991 the National VA Surgical Risk Study (NVASRS) began in 44 Veteran's Administration Medical Centers. By 31 December 1993, there was information for 500,000 non-cardiac surgical procedures. In 1994 NVASRS was expanded to all 128 HVA hospitals that performed the surgery. The name was then changed to the National Surgical Quality Improvement Program.

== ACS NSQIP Data ==
The ACS NSQIP collects data on 135 variables, including preoperative risk factors, intraoperative variables, and 30-day postoperative mortality and morbidity outcomes for patients undergoing major surgical procedures in both the inpatient and outpatient setting.
