= Curve (theatre) =

Theatre in Leicester, England

Coordinates: 52°38′7.8″N 1°7′39″W

Curve Theatre
- Performing Arts Centre
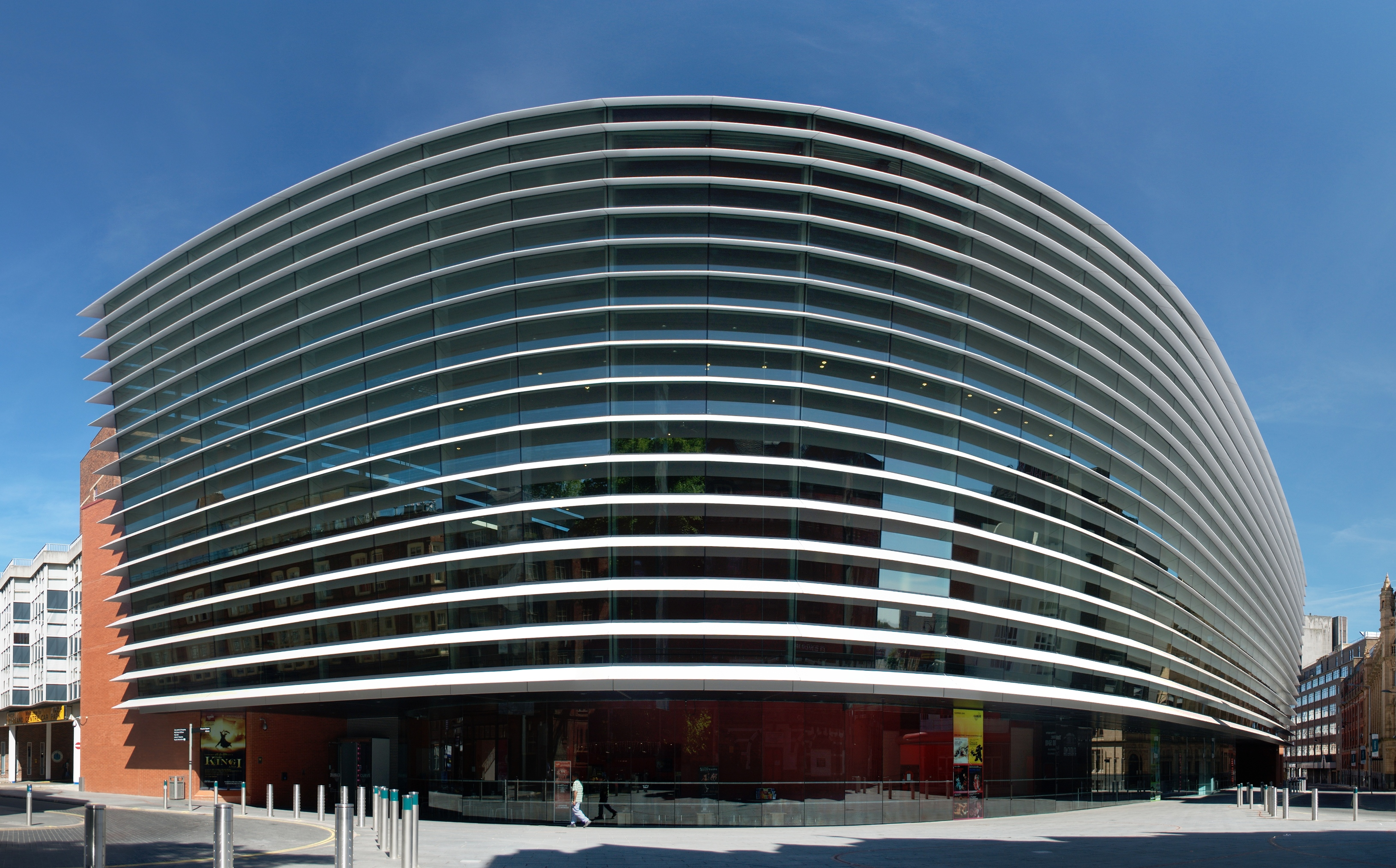
- Interactive map of Curve Theatre
- Address: Rutland Street; Leicester; UK
- Owner: Leicester City Council
- Operator: Leicester Theatre Trust
- Capacity: Theatre 968; Studio 350

Construction
- Opened: 2008
- Years active: 13
- Architect: Rafael Viñoly
- Builder: Lendlease

Website
- www.curveonline.co.uk

Curve, also known as Curve Theatre, is a theatre in Leicester, England, based in the cultural quarter in Leicester City Centre. Previously, it had been called Leicester Performing Arts Centre. It is adjacent to the Leicester Athena conference and banqueting centre.

== Overview ==
Curve Theatre was designed by the architect Rafael Viñoly in association with the scenographers ducks scéno and Charcoalblue and the acousticians Kahle Acoustics; Adams Kara Taylor engineered the structure for the project whilst the Mechaical and Electrical design, including environmental controlof the theatre and foyer, and cabling distribution for theatre equipment and lighting, were by Arup. Curve stands in the centre of what the City Council calls the new "Cultural Quarter" on Rutland Street. It features two auditoria, one with 970 seats (referred to as the Theatre) while a 350-seat auditorium (referred to as the Studio) provides a smaller space with its own power flying system. The Theatre, Studio and their stages can also be opened up to create one large space with a capacity of 1,300. When the 2 18 tonne steel walls separating the stage and the foyer are lifted, the stage is visible from street level. The glass façade encloses an open plan foyer with views onto the café, bars, backstage area, and across the stage.

The theatre was built by a partnership of Leicester City Council, Arts Council England (with funds from The National Lottery), East Midlands Development Agency, Leicester Shire Economic Partnership, with the project part-financed by the European Union (ERDF), in partnership with Leicester Theatre Trust and in association with Phoenix Arts Centre. The project, which was undertaken by Lendlease, was blighted by huge cost increases that more than doubled the initial estimates.

The theatre opened on 11 November 2008 with a celebratory opening show called Lift Off. This was followed by Simply Cinderella, which ran from 4 December 2008 (the day it was officially opened by Queen Elizabeth II) until 24 January 2009 – a new musical of the fairytale, written by Grant Olding and Toby Davies, and directed by dancer Adam Cooper.

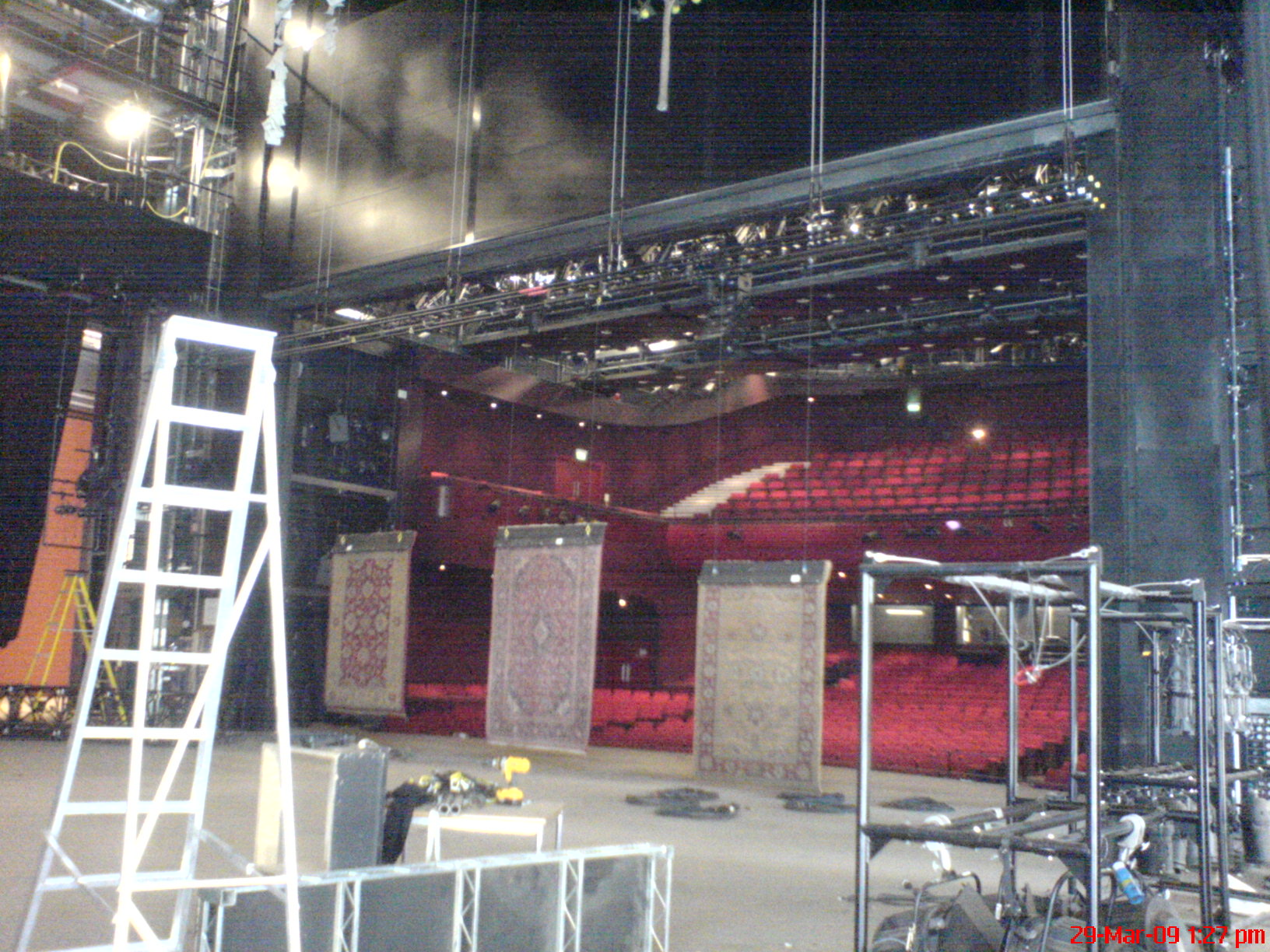
Curve theatre stage & auditorium from the open walled wing

== Selected productions ==
- Simply Cinderella by Grant Olding and Toby Davis (2008–09)
- In-I starring Juliette Binoche and Akram Kahn (2009)
- The Pillowman by Martin McDonagh starring Marc Warren (2009)
- Peter Pan-The Musical by Julian Ronnie and Paul Miller (2009–10)
- A Festival of Friel: Molly Sweeney and Translations by Brian Friel
- The King and I by Richard Rodgers and Oscar Hammerstein II (2010–11)
- Absurd Person Singular by Alan Ayckbourn (2011)
- 42nd Street (2011–12)
- Hello Dolly! (2012–13)
- Gypsy (2012)
- Piaf by Pam Gems (2013)
- Chicago (2013–14)
- Hairspray (2014 and 2015 - UK Tour)
- The Sound of Music by Rodgers and Hammerstein (2014–15)
- Sue Townsend's The Secret Diary of Adrian Mole Aged 13¾ (2015)
- The Witches by Roald Dahl and David Wood (2015–16)
- Oliver! by Lionel Bart (2015–16)
- Breakfast at Tiffany's by Truman Capote adapted by Richard Greenberg starring Pixie Lott (2016)
- West Side Story starring Jamie Muscato (2019–2020)
- Sunset Boulevard - At Home starring Ria Jones & Danny Mac (2020–2021) (Live Stream)
- The Color Purple - At Home starring T'Shan Williams (2021) (Live Stream)
- A Chorus Line starring Adam Cooper and Jocasta Almgill (2024)
- ’’My Fair Lady ’’ 2024
- ’’The Sound of Music ‘’ 2025 with Molly Lynch and David Seadon-Young

== COVID-19 ==
COVID-19 Hit the theatre industry hard, as the UK was put into multiple lockdowns, and theatres were unable to open. Curve acquired the rights to perform two 'At Home' productions of musicals that had previously been performed at Curve. The first was Sunset Boulevard, based upon Sunset Boulevard (musical), first performed at Curve Theatre in 2017. The show brought back the same cast as the 2017 show, with Ria Jones and Danny Mac in the starring roles. The performance was filmed 'as live' and streamed out online between December 2020 - January 2021. The show received multiple 4 and 5 star reviews from the local and national newspapers.

The second show was The Color Purple, based upon the 2005 musical The Color Purple (musical). The Color Purple was originally performed at Curve in 2019, the same cast was brought back for this online stream. The Color Purple was a roaring success with multiple 4 and 5 star reviews from national and local news outlets.

== Selected touring productions ==
- Cameron Mackintosh and Chichester Festival Theatre's Barnum (2014)
- Disney and Cameron Mackintosh's Mary Poppins (2015)
- Cameron Mackintosh's Miss Saigon (2017)
- Royal Shakespeare Company's Matilda The Musical (2018), (2025)

• Les Misérables (2018) • War Horse (2019) • The Phantom of the Opera (2020) • Beauty and the Beast (2021)

== Leicester Theatre Trust ==
Curve Theatre is run by the Leicester Theatre Trust (LTT), an independent charitable organisation. LTT took over the operation of Curve in August 2008. The Leicester Theatre Trust formed in 1969, it is a regularly funded client of Arts Council England (ACE) and receives annual revenue funding from Leicester City Council.

From 1973 to 2007 the organisation programmed and operated the Haymarket Theatre.

== See also ==
- Haymarket Theatre (Leicester)
- Little Theatre (Leicester)
- Sue Townsend Theatre
- De Montfort Hall
