= Holy Trinity Church, Leicester =

HTL Church
- Holy Trinity Church, Leicester
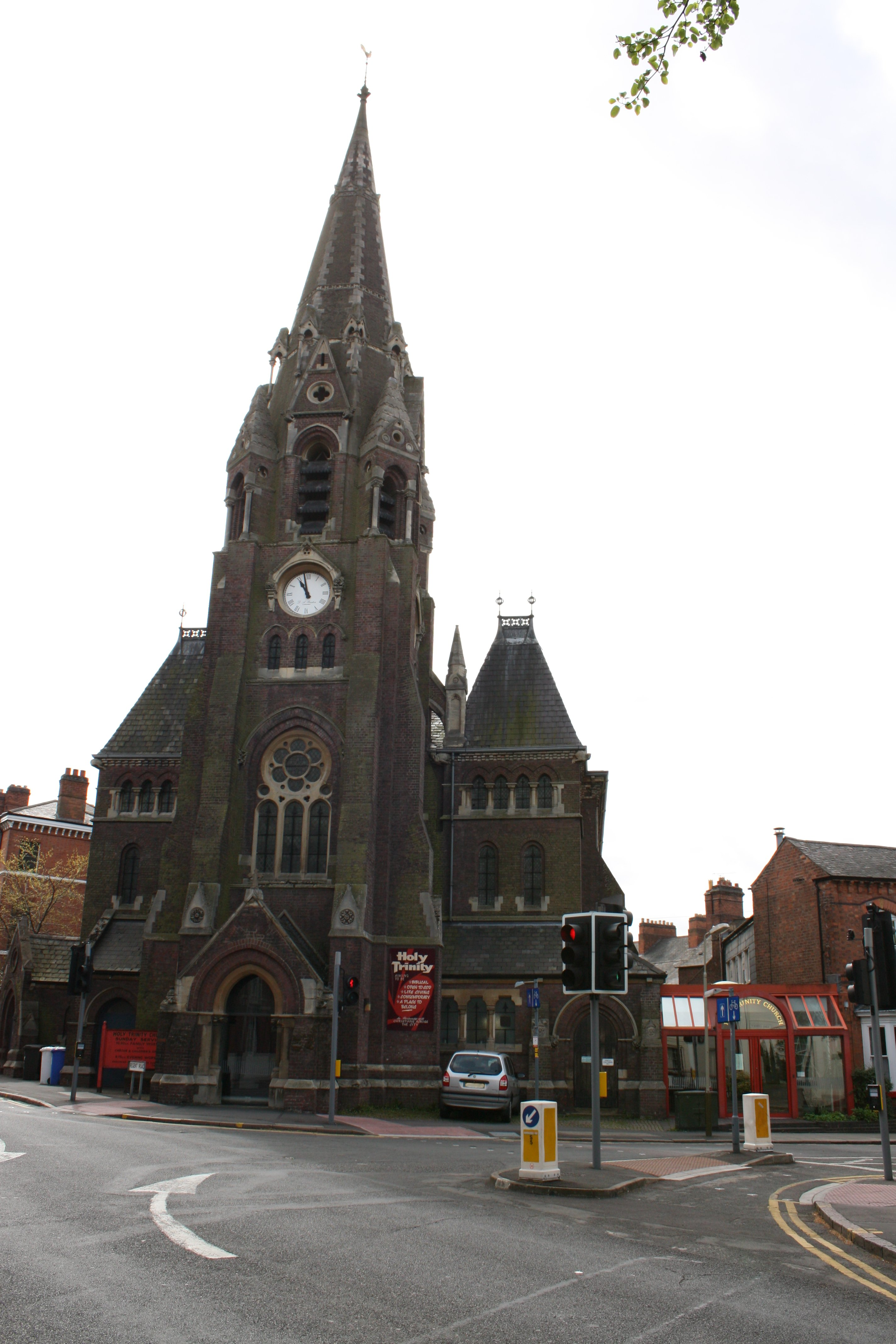
- Holy Trinity Church, Leicester

- Location within Leicestershire
- 52°37′43″N 1°7′51.4″W
- OS grid reference: SK 58928 03768
- Location: Leicester
- Country: England
- Denomination: Church of England
- Churchmanship: Charismatic Evangelical
- Website: https://htl.church/

History
- Dedication: Holy Trinity

Architecture
- Heritage designation: Grade II listed
- Architect: Samuel Sanders Teulon
- Completed: 1838 (rebuilt 1871)

Administration
- Province: Province of Canterbury
- Diocese: Diocese of Leicester
- Archdeaconry: Leicester
- Deanery: Leicester
- Parish: Holy Trinity with St John the Divine, Leicester

Clergy
- Bishop: Martyn Snow
- Vicar: The Revd Elaine Sutherland

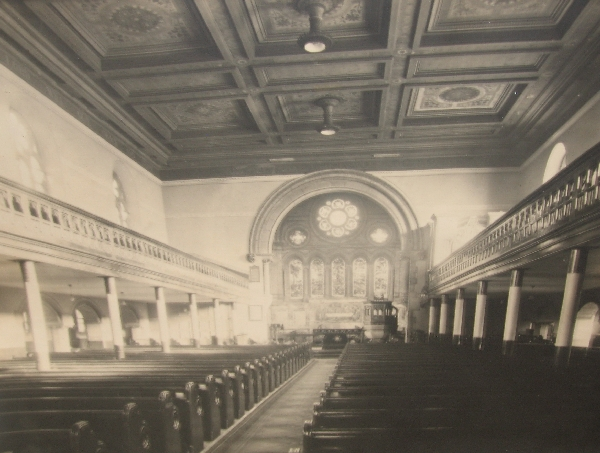
Holy Trinity Church, 19th Century

Holy Trinity Church (HTL Church) is a Church of England parish church in Leicester, England. The Victorian building is situated on Regent Road to the south of the city centre, close to the University of Leicester, De Montfort University and the Leicester Royal Infirmary. It is part of the Evangelical and Charismatic movements in Anglicanism.

Elaine Sutherland was appointed as Vicar in March 2020. James Norris and Jitesh Patel are the Associate Vicars, appointed in September 2021 and March 2018 respectively.

== History ==
The Church Building Act 1818 provided funds for two new Leicester parishes, one of which was Holy Trinity. The church was built in 1838 to Sydney Smirke's classical design as the city expanded, and formed part of a new suburb. The new parish, also established in 1838, was created out of part of the parish of St Mary de Castro Church.

In 1872, Holy Trinity was completely redesigned by Samuel Sanders Teulon in a High Gothic style, with spire and side turrets in red-purple brick with limestone decoration.

During the 19th century the church had wooden pews and a single central aisle, with balconies on both sides of the church; the central aisle was occupied by the middle classes and the balconies by their servants. Access to ground floor was via the main church entrance, with two side entrances for the balconies.

== Buildings ==
A significant building project was carried out in 2018–2019, resulting in a reordered building, including main worship space, and entrance area that incorporates a coffee house. The existing balcony has been extended with new stairs within the Chancel, and the stage area has been reordered.

The chancel end wall has five arched stained glass windows featuring contemporary designs of the Parable of The Sower (see Matthew 12:1-24), above which there is a more traditional floral design including an emblem of the Trinity, with smaller windows featuring "The Truth" and "The Life", but there is not a window depicting "The Way" (see John 14:6). The chancel marble end wall also features a depiction of the Last Supper.

The pipe organ was transferred to a church in Poland in 2020.

The church and nearby buildings are now part of the New Walk conservation area.

== Present ==
HTL Church is a Mission-Shaped church, where church members belong to mid-sized Missional Communities based around geographical locations, social networks or interests. HTL states that its vision is "Following Jesus, Making Disciples, Raising Disciples".

The church community is made up of a range of different ages, including many children and young people and a large population of university students. HTL Church is also connected with the ministry of the Charismatic Evangelical movement New Wine.

The church is actively involved in outreach into the local communities in Leicester including ministry to the city's homeless called "Triangle". HTL Church runs the Alpha course throughout the year.

The morning services are family-oriented with music by a live band, and the evening tends to attract more students and young adults. The services are livestreamed on Youtube and Facebook.

== List of Vicars ==
- William Hill 1838 - 1865
- Edmund Davys 1865 - 1876
- James Arthur Faithfull 1878 - 1882
- Edward Grose-Hodge 1890 - 1894
- W. Jeffry Thompson 1894 - 1906
- Frederick Papprill 1905 - 1921
- R. Chalmers ca. 1939
- John Aldis 1980 - 1989
- Roger Morgan 1990 - 2008
- John McGinley 2009 - 2019
- Elaine Sutherland 2020–Present

== Organ and list of organists ==
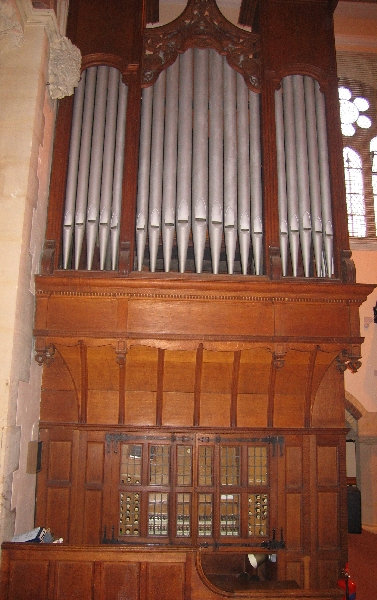
The organ of 1901, by J. Porritt of Leicester

The organ was removed in May 2018. A specification of the pipe organ can be found on the National Pipe Organ Register.

=== Organists ===
- Edwin John Crow 1861 - 1866 (later organist of Ripon Cathedral)
- James M. Morland ca. 1873
- Walter James Bunney 1884 - 1905 (afterwards organist of St Peter's Church, Leicester)
- Vincent Dearden ???? - 1913
- James William Wilson 1913 - ???? (formerly organist of St Matthew's Church, Leicester)
- Percy Jones ???? - 1930
- Jack King 1930 - 1932 (formerly organist at St Matthew's Church, Leicester)
- Dennis Arnold Smith 1932 - 1938
- Alec McGregor 1977 - 1995
