= Leicester Bike Park =

Bicycle parking facility

Coordinates: 52.6337°N 1.1328°W

The Leicester Bike Park is a bicycle parking facility in Leicester Town Hall, England. It is managed by the City Council.

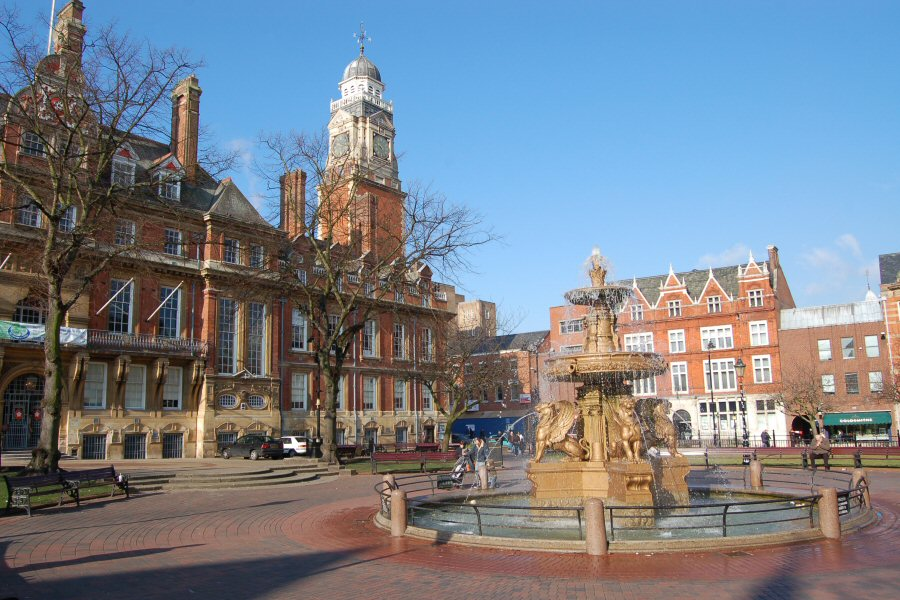
The Bike Park is located at the far right hand corner of the building

Facilities include secure bike parking, showers, changing rooms, lockers, and advice.

The Bike Park was developed as the result of research into public attitudes to cycling, carried out by Groundwork Leicester and Leicestershire (then trading as Environ) in the 1990s. These studies showed that, in addition to the need for safe cycle routes, the lack of secure bike parking and changing facilities for commuters were barriers preventing people from cycling. The Bike Park was opened in 1997.

Through the Bike Park and other initiatives, Leicester City has seen an 81% growth in commuter cycling (2004 to 2009) and the average daily number cycle journeys in the city has grown to 10,500.
