= Nigel Briers =

English cricketer (born 1955)

Personal information
- Full name: Nigel Edwin Briers
- Born: 15 January 1955 (age 71); Southfields, Leicester, Leicestershire, England
- Batting: Right-handed
- Bowling: Right-arm medium-pace

Career statistics
Competition	First-class	List A
Matches	381	338
Runs scored	18,726	8,216
Batting average	33.02	27.66
100s/50s	31/95	6/40
Top score	201*	119*
Balls bowled	2047	896
Wickets	32	19
Bowling average	30.87	38.15
5 wickets in innings	0	0
10 wickets in match	0	0
Best bowling	4/29	3/29
Catches/stumpings	152/–	96/–
- Source: CricInfo, 18 September 2013

Nigel Edwin Briers (born 15 January 1955 in Southfields, Leicester, England) played first-class and List A cricket for Leicestershire between 1971 and 1995.

== Cricket career ==
A right-handed opening batsman, Briers was Leicestershire's youngest-ever first-class cricketer when he made his debut at 16 in 1971, but it was for his deeds towards the end of his career that he won accolades.

The accolades, though, related not just to his longevity as batman but also to his captaincy. Appointed to succeed David Gower in charge of an under-achieving team in 1990, Briers brought a touch of school-masterly discipline to the team that paid off in terms of results and earned the loyal respect of his team. In 1992, though finishing only halfway up the County Championship table, Leicestershire spent much of the summer challenging for the leadership, and also went to their first-ever Gillette Cup final, the last of the 17 counties that were first-class when the competition started in 1963 to make an appearance in the final. Briers was rewarded by being named as a Wisden Cricketer of the Year in the 1993 edition of the almanack.

Leicestershire and Briers continued to do well for the next three seasons, and Briers stepped down from the captaincy at the end of the 1995 season, intending to continue playing as a batsman for a further season at least. But a knee injury, followed by an operation, left him as a spectator as the county, under new captain James Whitaker, took their second Championship title in 1996, and he never played first-class cricket again.

Briers' highest score was 201 not out, in the second innings against Warwickshire at Edgbaston in 1983. His best bowling figures were 4 for 29 against Derbyshire at Grace Road, Leicester in 1985.

== Personal life ==
Briers was educated at Lutterworth Grammar School and at Borough Road College in London, where he studied teaching.

He was the Director of Cricket and Director of Sport at Marlborough College. He was then Director of Sport and Director of Cricket at St Paul's School, Barnes, until he stepped down in July 2021. He now works there as a cricket coach.
