= Phoenix Square =

Coordinates: 52.6359°N 1.1249°W

Phoenix Cinema and Arts Centre
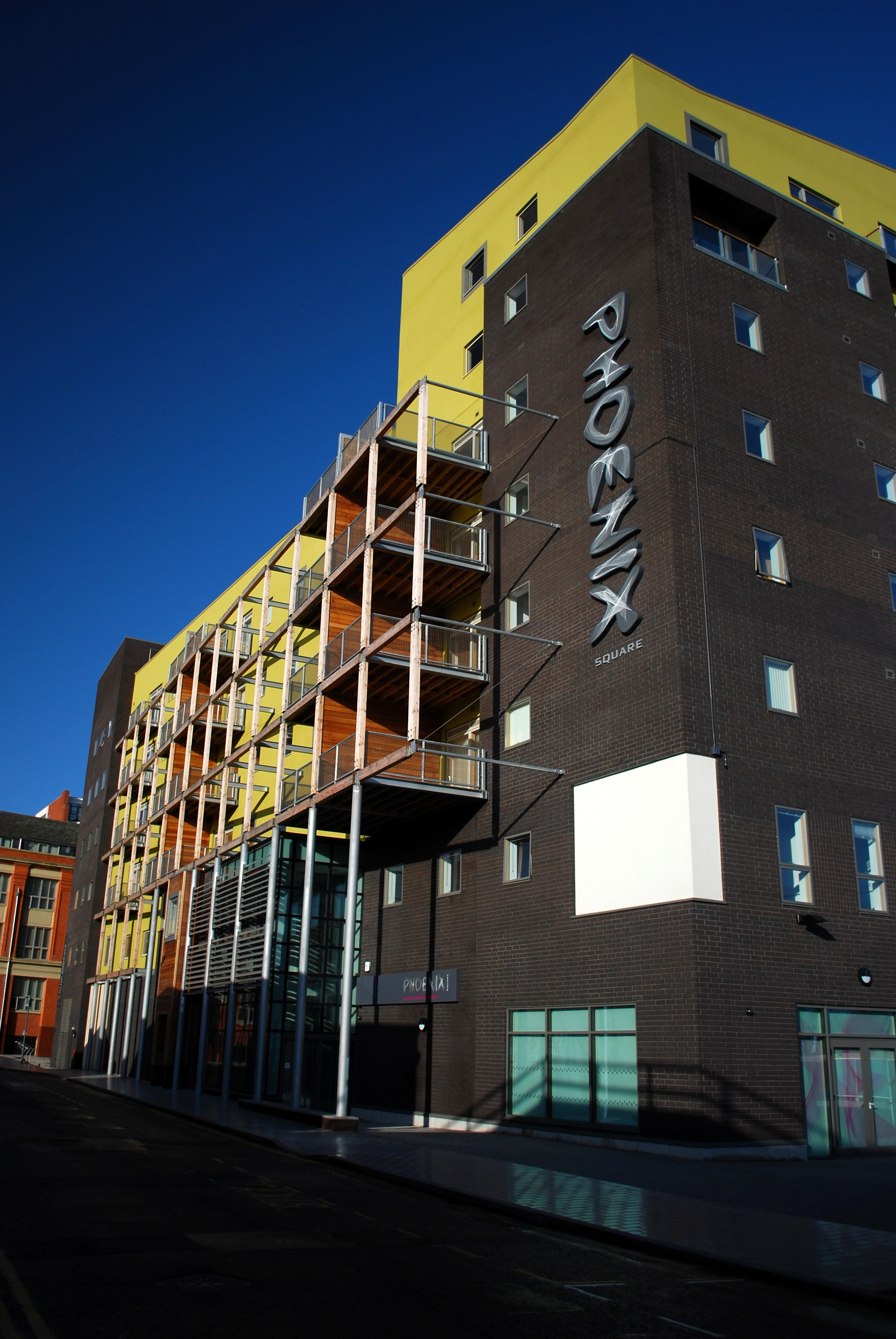
- Interactive map of Phoenix Cinema and Arts Centre
- Former names: Phoenix Square, Digital Media Centre
- Location: Leicester, England, UK
- Type: Cinema/Gallery/Cafe Bar

Construction
- Opened: 2009

Website
- www.phoenix.org.uk

Phoenix Cinema and Arts Centre is a cinema, art gallery and Café Bar in the city centre of Leicester, England. The four-screen, recently refurbished cinema shows everything from micro-budget independent films to the latest Hollywood blockbusters, and often hosts festivals and special events. The regularly changing art programme presents work by local and international artists, and the education programme provides short film courses for people to learn about, and create their own films.

Phoenix is a charity with an overarching aim to bring inspiring film and art to all, and was established in 1989. This mission is enacted through its education programme, grants and events to develop upcoming artistic talent and efforts to widen access to cinema. Much of this work is financed through its mainstream cinema ticket sales, and bustling Café Bar.

The venue is currently situated in the Phoenix Square building. Work began on constructing the £21.5 million scheme in November 2007 and was completed in autumn 2009: Phoenix Square officially opened on 19 November 2009. The cinema replaces the Phoenix Arts Centre, and maintains strong links with De Montfort University. The building houses a digital exhibition space and digital production facilities, four modern cinema screens, a screen room, learning space, terrace room and rooftop bar, The Nest. Space is provided for 37 creative businesses, as well as a Café Bar open to the public.

A Leicester institution for well over half a century, Phoenix began its life as the Phoenix Theatre on Upper Brown Street in 1963.

The venue was formerly known as Phoenix Square, and has been previously referred to as Leicester Digital Media Centre.
