= City Hall, Leicester =

Municipal building in Leicester, England

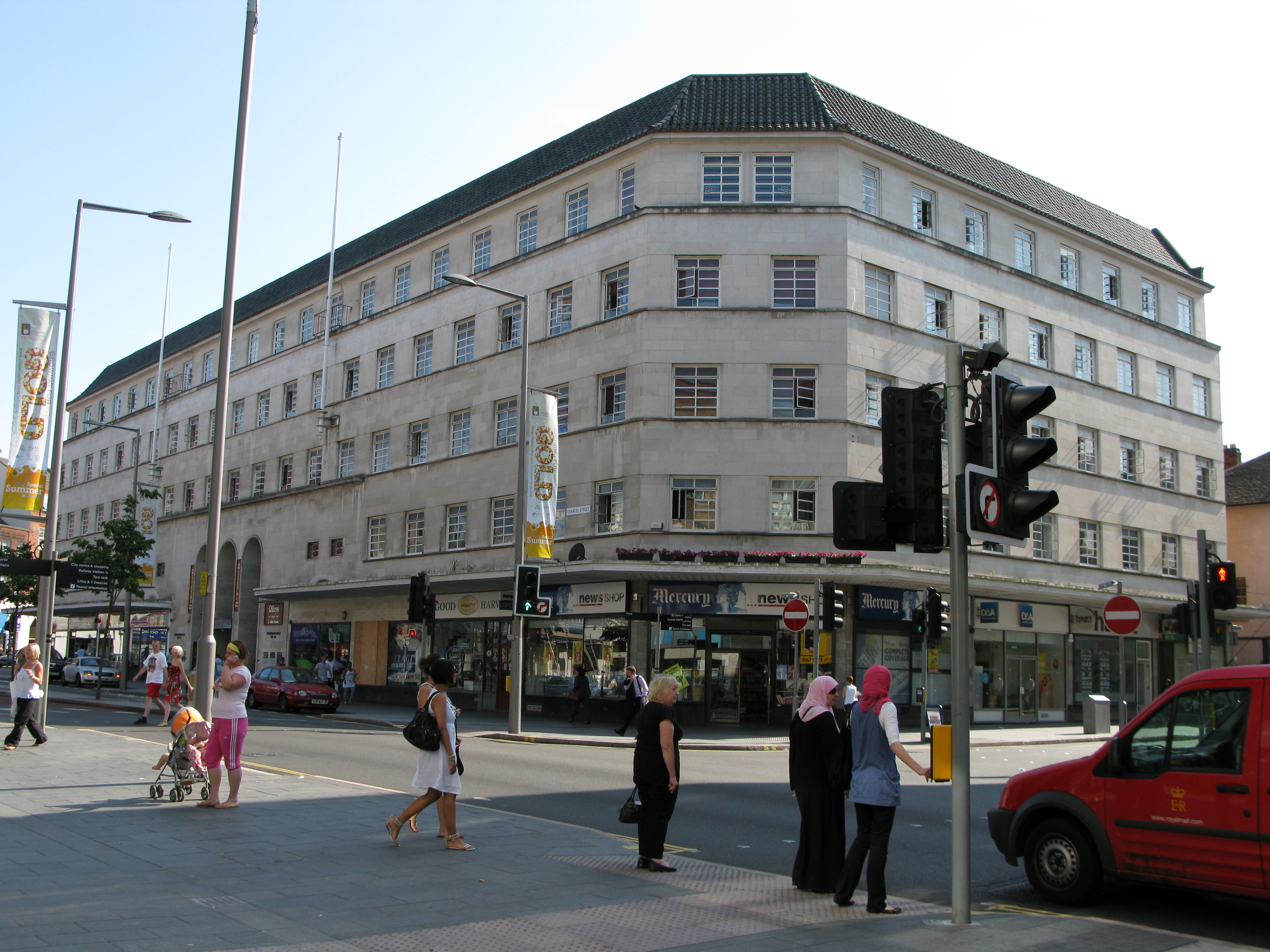
- City Hall, Leicester

- Shown in Leicestershire
- 52.6344°N 1.1298°W
- Location: Charles Street, Leicester

History
- Built: 1938

Site notes
- Architect(s): Leonard Barnish and Spencer Silcock
- Architectural style: Art Deco style

City Hall, formerly Attenborough House and, before that, the Municipal Buildings, is a municipal building in Charles Street, Leicester, England. The structure, which currently accommodates the offices of Leicester City Council, is a locally listed building.

== History ==
The building was commissioned to provide additional office accommodation for Leicester City Council which had been operating from Leicester Town Hall since 1876. The site selected by civic leaders, on the west side of Charles Street, was occupied by a large number of small buildings.

The new building was designed by Leonard Barnish and Spencer Silcock in the Art Deco style, built in Portland stone, and was officially opened by the Lord Mayor, Councillor Frank Acton, on 7 November 1938. The design involved a five-storey symmetrical main frontage of 21 bays facing onto Charles Street. The central section of seven bays featured three tall openings which spanned the lower two floors. The ground floor accommodated a series of shop fronts, which were protected by a long canopy, on either side of the openings. On the upper floors, all bays were all fenestrated by rectangular casement windows, and the corners onto Rutland Street and Halford Street were canted. The fourth floor was slightly recessed and was surmounted by a prominent mansard roof.

In addition to accommodating various departments of Leicester Corporation, the building also became the home for its electricity showrooms which later evolved into the showrooms of the East Midlands Electricity Board. In the 1960s, a bunker was constructed under the building to protect the councillors from nuclear attack. At that time the building also accommodated the box office for the sale of concert tickets for De Montfort Hall.

After the council officers and their departments moved to new offices at the New Walk Centre in 1975, the Charles Street building was re-purposed for commercial use and became known as Attenborough House. One of the tenants was Willie Thorne's Snooker Club. However, in 2009, it became necessary to vacate the New Walk Centre after it was found to be structurally unsound.

A major refurbishment of the Charles Street building, carried out by Willmott Dixon at a cost of £14 million to a design by Franklin Ellis Architects, was completed in 2014. This enabled Leicester City Council to move the council officers and their departments back into the building in Charles Street, which was then renamed City Hall. The principal assembly room in the refurbished building was named the Attenborough Hall. The refurbishment was placed first in the Restoration Award Category in the Civic Society Awards in 2014.

The main council offices are at City Hall on Charles Street, but council meetings continue to be held in the town hall in Town Hall Square.
