= St Peter's Church, Leicester =

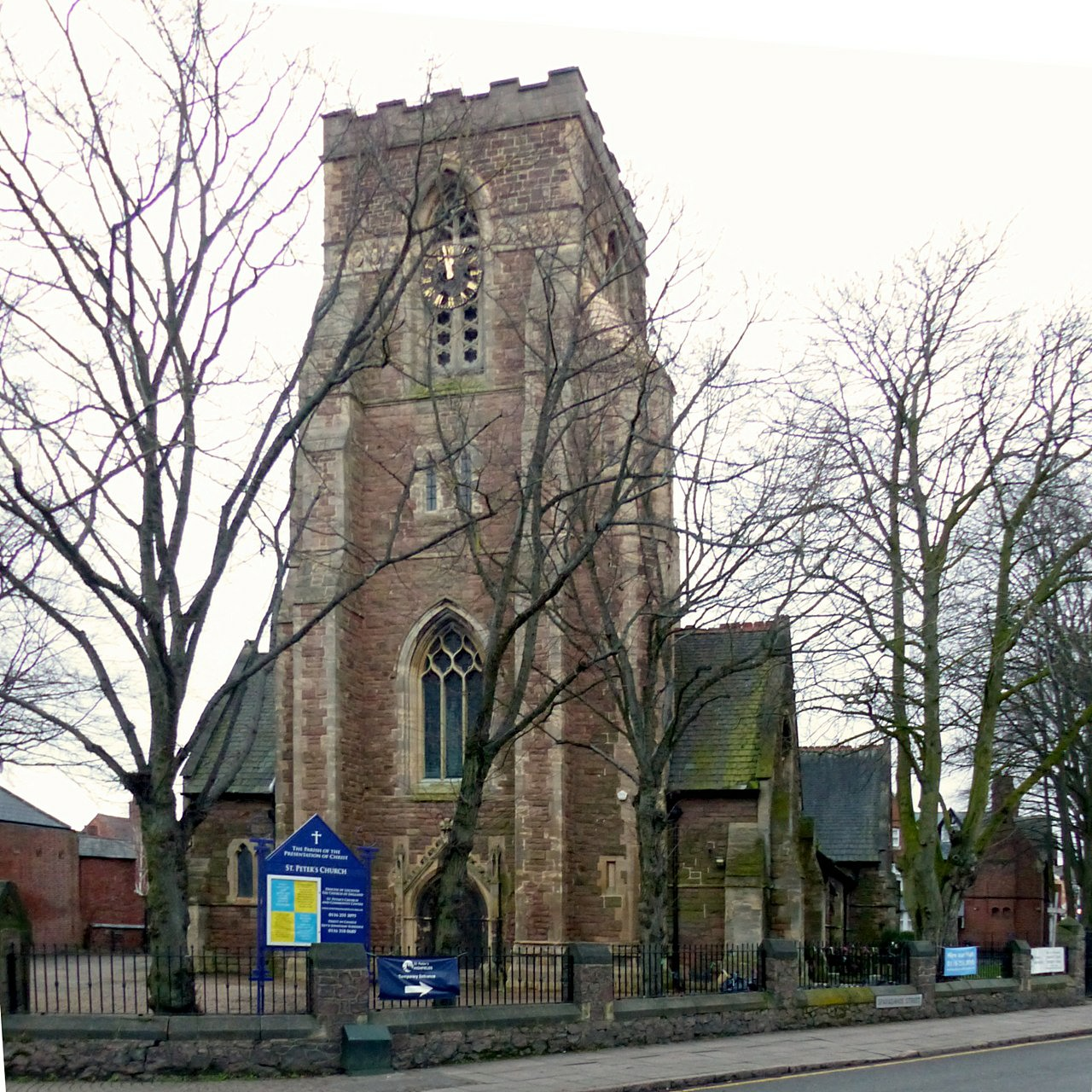
- St Peter's Church, Leicester
- St Peter's Church, Leicester
- 52°37′48″N 1°06′59.9″W
- OS grid reference: SK 59900 03949
- Location: Leicester
- Country: England
- Denomination: Church of England
- Website: stpetershighfields.co.uk

History
- Dedication: St Peter
- Consecrated: 16 April 1874

Architecture
- Heritage designation: Grade II listed
- Architect: George Edmund Street
- Groundbreaking: 1872
- Completed: 1879

Administration
- Diocese: Diocese of Leicester
- Archdeaconry: Leicester
- Deanery: City of Leicester
- Benefice: Benefice of St Peter Highfields and St Philip's Leicester
- Parish: Parish of St Peter Highfields, Leicester

Clergy
- Rector: The Rev Jonathan Surridge, 2016

St Peter's Church, Leicester, is a Grade II listed parish church in the Church of England in the Highfields area of Leicester.

== History ==
The foundation stone was laid on 14 November 1872 by the Bishop of Peterborough. The church was built as a memorial to Richard Curzon-Howe, 1st Earl Howe, and was originally known as the Howe Memorial Church. It was built to the designs of the architect George Edmund Street.

The church was consecrated on 18 April 1874 by the Bishop of Peterborough.

The spire was dismantled in 1968 and the building continued to deteriorate such that by 2014 the tower masonry and roof coverings were in very poor condition, and the building was added to the Heritage at Risk register.

Between 2018 and 2021, repairs funded by the Heritage Lottery, Leicester City Council, the Diocese of Leicester and the church's own funds, led to the tower, tower roof, stonework and the main roof being repaired.

== Incumbents ==
- F.W. Robinson 1874 - 1893 (afterwards vicar of Paston)
- W. Perowne Holmes 1893.- 1906
- A.I. Grieves 1906 - 1911 (afterwards vicar of Finedon)
- Ambrose Lethbridge 1911 - 1917 (afterwards rector then provost of St Mary's Cathedral, Glasgow)
- William Thompson Elliott 1917 - 1926 (formerly vicar of All Saints’ Church, Bradford, afterwards Vicar of Leeds)
- G.E. Powell 1926 - 1933
- Robert L. Leatherdale 1934 - 1945 (afterwards residentiary canon of Ripon Cathedral)
- Albert William Eaton 1945 - 1960 (formerly rector of Christ Church, Johannesburg)
- Edward Wilson Carlile from 1960

== Parish status ==
The church is in a benefice with St Philip's on Evington Road, Leicester.

== Organ ==
The pipe organ was built by Joshua Porritt in 1875. It was extensively modified by Stephen Taylor and Son in 1910. A specification of the organ can be found on the National Pipe Organ Register.

=== Organists ===
- William Henry Wale 1874 - 1882
- Philip Angrave 1882 - 1891
- Cardinal Taylor 1891 - 1894 (afterwards organist of St Mary's Church, Humberston)
- Walter Joseph Bunney FRCO 1905 - 1936 (formerly organist of Holy Trinity Church, Leicester)
- Harold Barnes 1937 - 1946 (afterwards organist of St Mary's Church, Melton Mowbray)
