= Leicester City Centre =

Coordinates: 52.636°N 1.133°W

Leicester city centre
- Central Business District
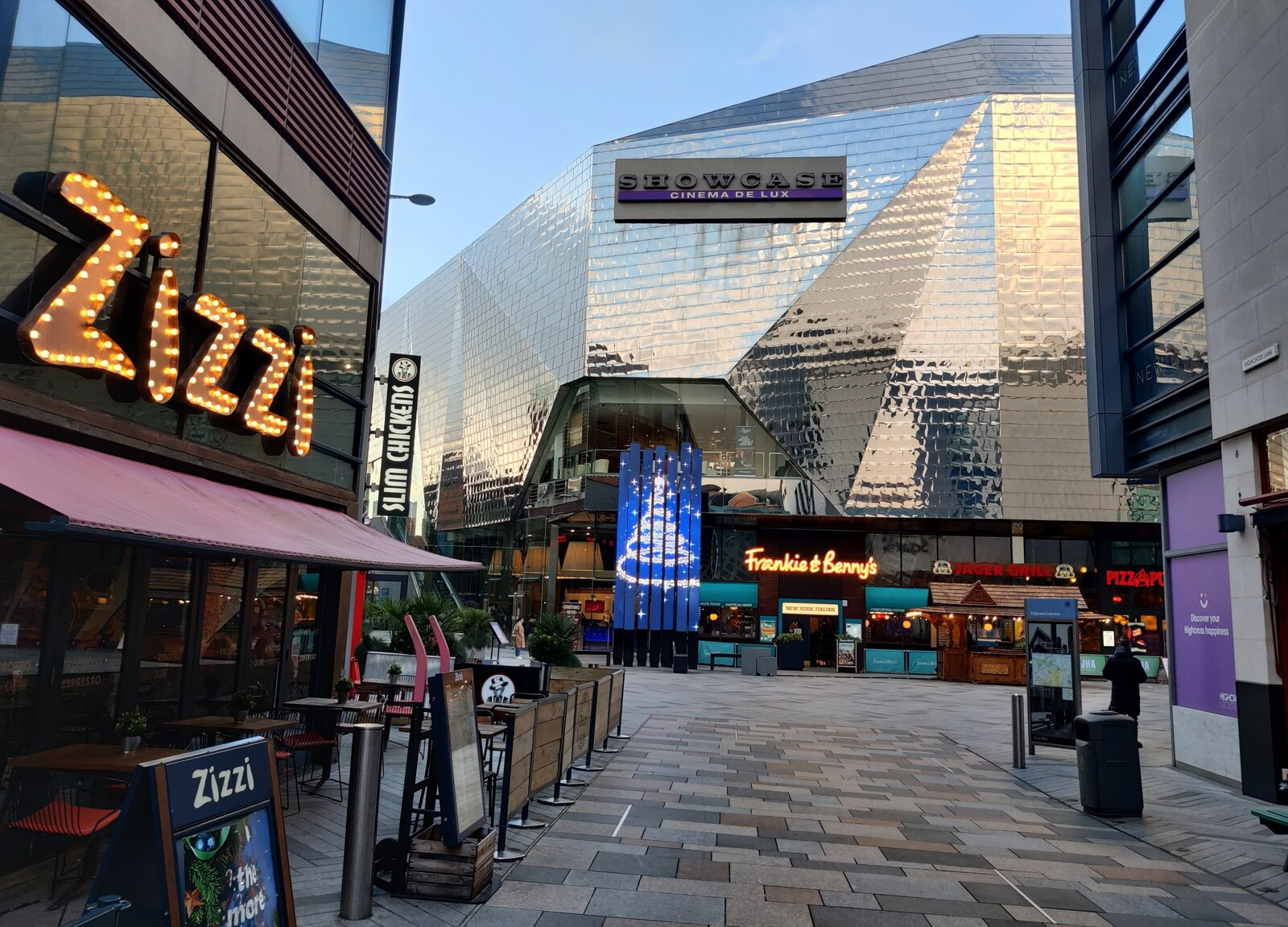
- Highcross Leicester

- Location within Leicestershire
- OS grid reference: SK584044
- Unitary authority: Leicester
- Ceremonial county: Leicestershire
- Region: East Midlands
- Country: England
- Sovereign state: United Kingdom
- Post town: LEICESTER
- Postcode district: LE1, LE2
- Dialling code: 0116
- Police: Leicestershire
- Fire: Leicestershire
- Ambulance: East Midlands

Leicester city centre is Leicester's historical commercial, cultural and transport hub and is home to its central business district. Its inner core is roughly delineated by the A594, Leicester's inner ring road, although the various central campuses of the University of Leicester, De Montfort University and Leicester College are adjacent to the inner ring road and could be considered to be a continuation of the City centre. In a similar way, the Leicester Royal Infirmary precinct, New Walk business district (Southfields), the Welford Road Stadium of Leicester Tigers’ RUFC and the King Power Stadium of Leicester City to the south, and the Golden Mile to the north could also be deemed to be extensions to the central core.

The city centre incorporates most of Leicester's shopping, with the Highcross and the Haymarket Shopping Centre as well as the 'Old Town' around Leicester Cathedral, Leicester Market and the Magazine Gateway. Politically, the city centre is split between the Leicester City Council wards of Abbey and Castle. A£19 million regeneration project transformed Leicester's city centre. The work won three awards: The Urbis Urban Regeneration Award in 2007 for Gallowtree Gate, The BCSC Town Centre "Gold" Best in Britain award in June 2009 and the Transport Times Walking & Public Realm award in July 2009.

== History ==
=== The old city ===
Key surviving historic sites of Leicester Old Town in relation to the modern City Centre. The Roman and medieval walls are marked by the dotted line. The one surviving Roman ruin is marked in purple. The secular sites are in blue. The towns five surviving ancient churches are in red. The key site of Leicester Abbey over the river is beyond the borders of the map to the north east.

The historic city of Leicester was founded by the Romans as Ratae Corieltauvorum - after the Corieltauvi, the local tribe of Britons whose tribal lands these were - at the crossing of the River Soar by the Fosse Way, between the current path of the river and the modern Gallowtree Gate.

It is thought that the later medieval walls and gates were in approximately the same positions as the Roman ones, with the forum being where the modern inner ring road meets St Nicholas Circle. The Roman baths are nearby and are preserved at Jewry Wall. The east gate was at the eastern end of High Street (preserved in the street name Eastgates), the north gate was at the northern end of Highcross Street, the west gate was on the town side of West Bridge, and the south gate was in the modern Friar Lane area – the city walls ran along the current Millstone Lane, Horsefair Street, Gallowtree Gate, Church Gate, Sanvey Gate and Soar Lane, with the western wall possibly running along the river Soar (there is some doubt as to whether the western wall existed). The city centre was the High Cross, at the junction of the current High Street and Highcross Street (in mediaeval times, High Street ran between the north and south gates along the line of the current Highcross Street, while the current High Street was called Swinesmarket). Leicester Cathedral and the Guildhall occupy this old area of town.

Leicester Castle lay on the south-western corner of the walls, and the Newarke was a separate walled area nearby. The Newarke Gateway (now known as the Magazine) is the only medieval gateway remaining. A small section of the town wall can be seen in the churchyard of St Mary de Castro. The town's main gates were sold and demolished in the late 18th century, being an impediment to the flow of traffic (the city's hay market was outside the walls for this reason, the main market being situated within the south-east corner of the walls).

=== Modern developments ===
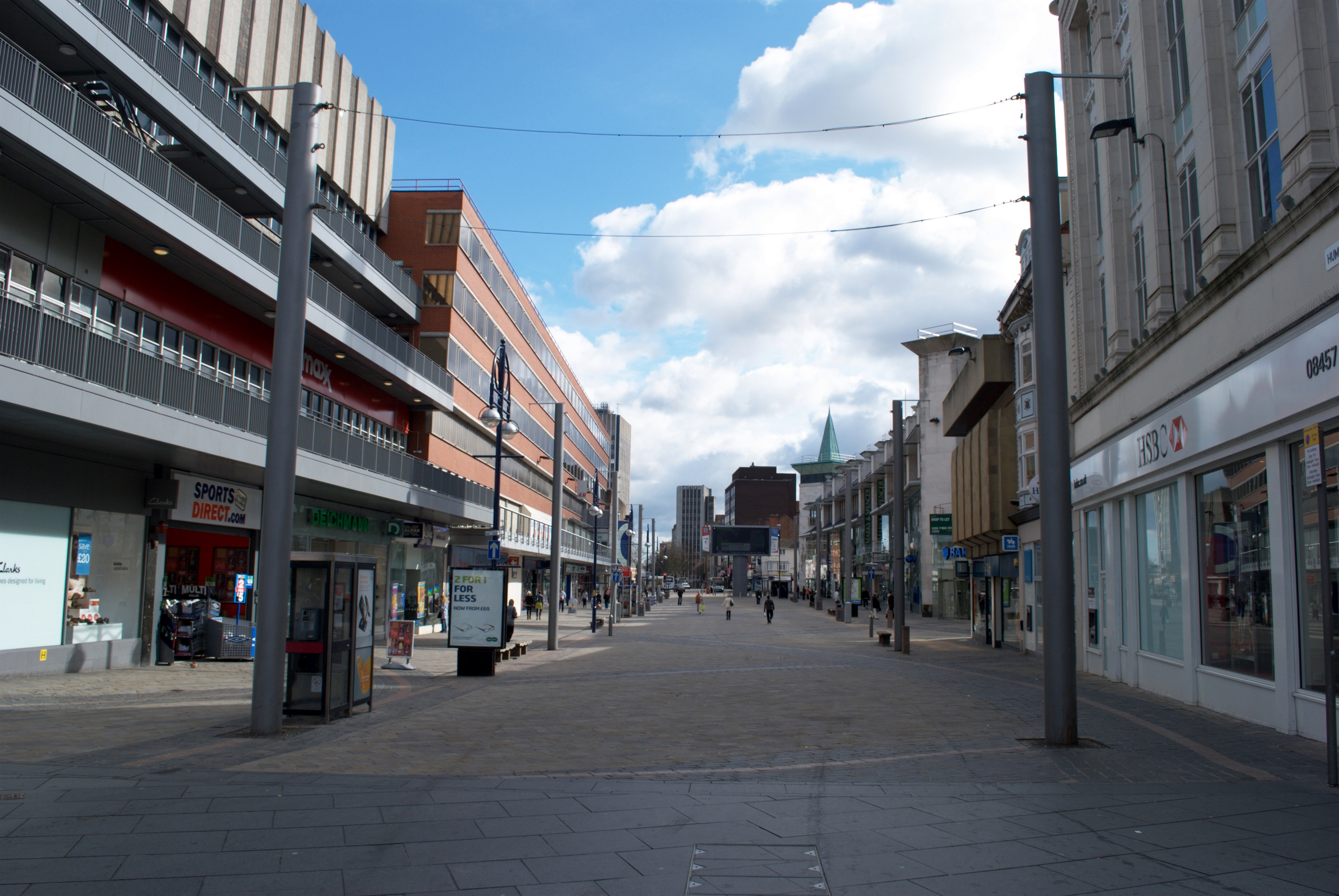
The pedestrianised section of Humberstone Gate. The Haymarket Shopping Centre is to the left.

With increasing development, particularly in the 19th century, the focal point moved eastwards, with the Haymarket Memorial Clock Tower roundabout seeing the five-way junction of the London to Manchester, Birmingham to Yarmouth and Fosse Way roads. This was influenced by the replacement of the A5199 road (now the A5199) by the A6), as the main route to London, because the Welford Road terminated in the tiny streets of the old town, and was therefore a hindrance for vehicles, while the London Road went past the East Gates of the city. Meanwhile, the civic centre moved southwards, with the Corporation of Leicester moving to a new town hall building in 1876 in the Market Street area, facing onto a new Town Hall Square, and just outside the walled town. Between these areas is the modern market, based to the south-west of the Haymarket Memorial Clock Tower area, which features the permanent outdoor covered Leicester Market, alongside an indoor market building selling fish, dairy produce, meat, etc., and the old Cornmarket building. Much of this old area of town is now in various conservation areas.

Outside of the ringroad, but close by, are the main campus of De Montfort University, Leicester Royal Infirmary, the Leicester City Football Club's King Power Stadium, the Leicester Tigers' Welford Road stadium and the prison. Leicester railway station is just on the outer side of the ringroad, on the A6. The University of Leicester is further away to the south-east, linked by the pedestrian-only path New Walk. When this was laid out in 1785, on the route of an ancient footpath, it passed through open land, becoming the route to the then Leicester Racecourse which later became Victoria Park but it soon saw development of large private houses on both sides of it.

The area inside the ringroad has two large shopping malls – Highcross Leicester (first opened as The Shires on the northern side of High Street and opening in 1991 with a large extension opened on 4 September 2008), and the Haymarket Shopping Centre (opened in 1974, on the site of the old hay market), both facing onto the Haymarket Memorial Clock Tower area.

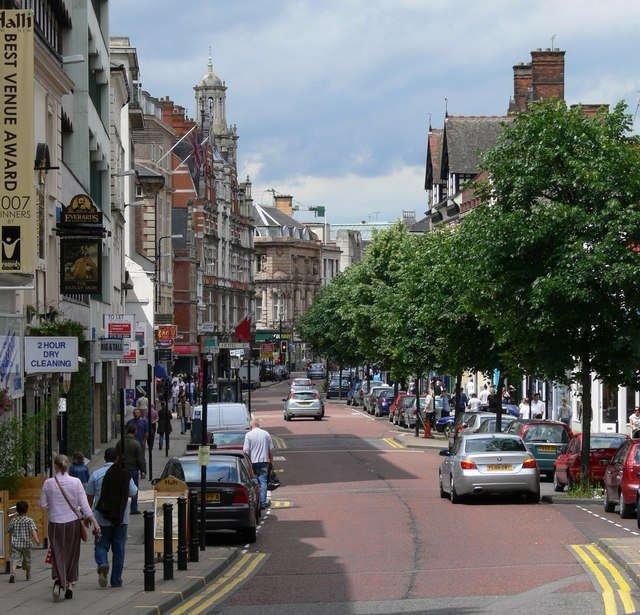
Granby Street.

Major chain stores can also be found on the pedestrianised Gallowtree Gate, running south-east from the clock tower, and which continues to the railway station as Granby Street. To the south of the Shires and west of Gallowtree Gate is an area known as The Lanes consisting mostly of small independent shops. This area's centrepiece is the St Martin's Square development (dating from the 1980s), and also features various smaller arcades, the Odeon Arcade, the Royal Arcade and the Malcolm Arcade. Further south than this is the market, and then the civic centre (as mentioned above), which also features the main lending and reference libraries, and a number of shops, both chain and independent.

The area around the junction of Humberstone Gate and the ring-road is the site of two strip malls – the larger of which is on the south-east side of the roundabout and called 'St George's Retail Park', the smaller being on the south-west side.

== Transport ==
The main bus companies serving the city centre are Arriva Midlands, Centrebus, First Leicester, Stagecoach Midlands and Roberts Coaches. There are two main bus stations; St Margaret's Bus Station, is on Gravel Street to the north of the centre and the Haymarket Bus Station is on Charles Street. A number of bus services terminate at on-street stops within the city. Regional and national coaches depart from St Margaret's Bus Station which was opened on 3 May 1985 and had a major refurbishment completed in March 2007.. Haymarket bus station which lies next to and serves as a transport hub for Haymarket Shopping Centre was developed at a proposed cost of £2m in mid-1994, coinciding with a major refurbishment of the adjacent Haymarket Shopping Centre complex. It underwent a major upgrade and expansion starting September 2014. The upgraded station opened in May 2016.

In late 2019, work started on a link road that would improve access between the two bus stations and allow for more pedestrianisation around the clock tower area.

Leicester London Road is now the only railway station in the city centre, after the closure of Leicester Belgrave Road and Leicester Central in the 1960s.

There are more than 8,500 off-street car parking spaces available in four distinct parking zones around the city centre. These are complemented by some 1,500 park and ride spaces at hubs around the city.

== Modern Day ==
=== Facilities ===
Leicester is home to a variety of theatres, such as the Y Theatre (at the YMCA), the Curve, the (currently mothballed) Haymarket Theatre, Little Theatre and Sue Townsend Theatre (formerly Phoenix Arts) and there is a small pub theatre called "The Theatre Upstairs" at The Western pub, 70 Western Road, Leicester. In the City centre there is the Phoenix Square Digital Arts Centre, Midland Street, Leicester (which has a regular programme of art-house and world cinema), a Cinema De Lux, part of Highcross Leicester, and an Odeon at Freemen's Common, some way to the south. The old Odeon building in Rutland Street was refurbished and opened in 2005 as the Leicester Athena, a conferencing and banqueting venue. The former ABC Cinema on Belgrave Gate has now been demolished and is currently being used as a car park, the site will be turned into a new shopping area with shops, casino, theatre and a new link road which will provide access to the new Highcross Leicester and St. Margaret's bus station.

Since the closure of St Margaret's baths, there is no municipal swimming pool in the city centre. Its replacement, the Braunstone Leisure Centre, is some miles away in Braunstone.

The area in the inside of the ring-road is nearly entirely built up, with only Nelson Mandela Park (at the extreme south, in Southfields), Museum Square (off New Walk) and Town Hall Square being considerable open spaces. Outside the ring road are Castle Gardens (by Leicester Castle), De Montfort Square (off New Walk), Victoria Park, Aylestone Meadows, Western Park and Abbey Park.

Musical venues in the city are somewhat limited since the closure in 1998 then the demolition of the Granby Halls in 2001– the largest two venues, De Montfort Hall (mentioned above) and University of Leicester's students union (now an O2 academy), are both in Southfields, some way from the city centre, whose main venues include the pub-sized The Musician, Firebug, and The Shed.

Several old Anglican churches are based in or around the city centre. St Martin's is now Leicester Cathedral. The other four historic parishes were St Margaret's, St Mary de Castro, All Saints', and St Nicholas'. The first Anglican Church to be built in the city after the medieval period was St George's – contrary to popular belief, this is not empty and disused but is in fact a Serbian Orthodox Church, used by the Serbian Orthodox people as a place of worship, regularly. There is a large Roman Catholic church and Priory named Holy Cross on New Walk/Wellington Street. The city centre is covered by an extensive system of CCTV cameras, supplemented by CCTV vans. Now that the main police station on Charles Street has closed, City Centre policing is based in a building off Belgrave Gate called Mansfield House.

=== Regeneration ===
Highcross Leicester opened on 4 September 2008 and has several flagship stores, including a John Lewis, a multiplex cinema, apartments, 2 public squares and al fresco dining and is the start of many regeneration projects in Leicester that have started to come to fruition.

To the east of Charles Street the city centre is dominated by disused factories and warehouses (which also have some presence in the other outer areas of the city centre). Conversion of these to residential accommodation is ongoing, particularly in the area east of Charles Street and around Humberstone Gate, which has been dubbed 'St George's' by the council, and was made a conservation area in 1989.

St George's South has been designated Leicester's new cultural quarter, and is already the site of the Leicester Creative Business Depot (built on the old Leicester City Bus depot and keeping the initials) and the Athena. The LCB Depot opened in July 2004, and by the time of its first birthday had let 37 of 55 units, with talk starting of finding an additional site.

Opposite the Athena, a new flagship £60 million Curve Theatre, Leicester, designed by Rafael Vinoly Architects, started construction in 2005, on a site that has been long-disused. The theatre opened on 11 November 2008. The centre is being funded by the various sources including the City Council, the Arts Council, the European Regional Development Fund and the East Midlands Development Agency.

Further to the south of St George's are plans to create a new business area, near the railway station, including re-use of the old police station, and renovation of the Leicester Mercury building.

St George's North has been proposed for a residential community by the Leicester Regeneration Company. Development has also started on waterfront properties, with a plan to re-use the Great Central station site.

Since the pedestrianisation of the High Street in Leicester city centre many of the independent retail shops have moved into this regenerated area. Some of Leicester's longest running independent shops can now be found in this area. However, the recent economic downturn and the opening of the Highcross Centre have led to a higher than expected number of closures and an increase in Charity outlets. There are current plans to develop a pedestrianised square, 'over-writing' a spend of almost £2m on parking in the square a few years ago.

== Architecture ==
=== Listed buildings ===
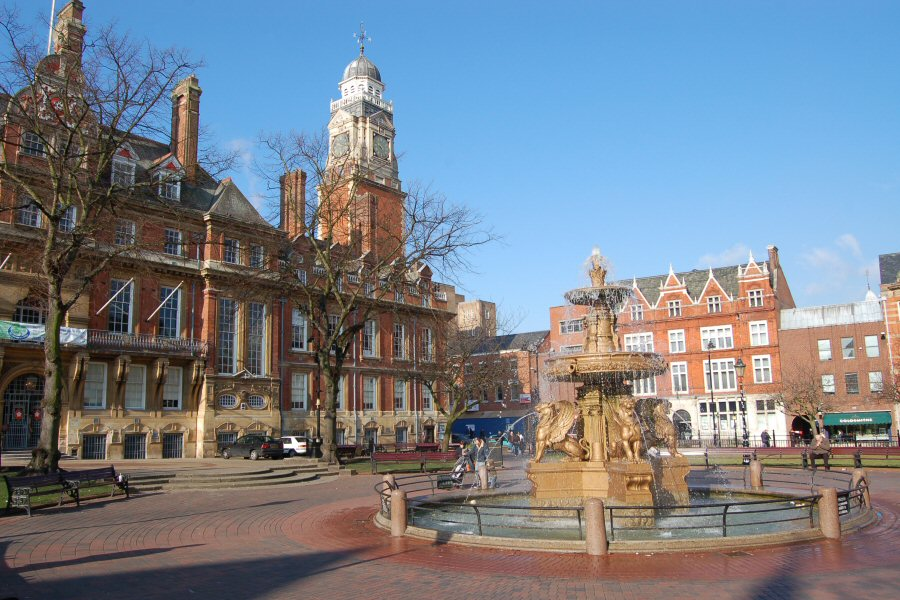
The town hall.

There are a few Grade I listed buildings.

- Jewry Wall
- Castle, Turret Gateway, Castle Hall, and St Mary de Castro
- The Guildhall
- The City Rooms on Hotel Street
- The Newarke Magazine Gateway
- St Margaret's Church
- St Nicholas' Church

A few of these are also scheduled monuments. There are many Grade II listed buildings, including

- The Turkey Cafe, Granby Street
- the Charles Street police building
- the Haymarket Memorial Clock Tower
- St Martin's Cathedral (II star)
- 31 Granby Street (HSBC bank)
- All Saints Church, Leicester is Grade B.

=== Skyscrapers ===
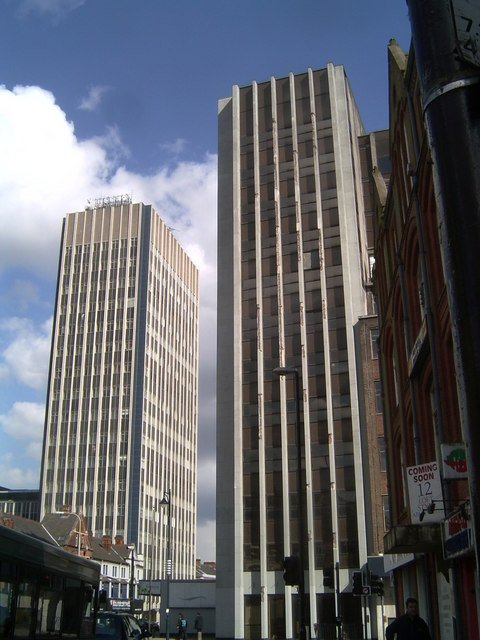
Leicester International Hotel, with the Cardinal Telephone Exchange tower on the left.

During the 1960s and 1970s, many large concrete tower blocks were built in and around the city centre for residential and office purposes, like many other cities across the UK. Cardinal Telephone Exchange and St Georges Tower, at 84 metres and 82 metres high respectively, are the two tallest skyscrapers in the whole East Midlands region. Many housing association blocks, averaging 55 metres tall with 20 storeys, were also erected in various Council estates – four in Highfields, two in St Matthews and a further two in Rowlatts Hill.

However, in later years, most of Leicester's office towers became disused and abandoned, with the 58 metres tall Thames Tower never achieving more than 50% occupancy since it was completed. Simultaneously, the residential towers became negatively associated with crime and social deprivation. The four residential blocks in St Matthews and Rowlatts Hill were vacated and demolished by Leicester City Council in 2001.

Thames Tower and St Georges Tower were both refurbished and reclad in 2009 by private developers, for use as residential apartments and hotels. St Georges Tower was painted royal blue, turning it into a very distinctive local landmark, albeit one that attracted mass controversy due to its perceived ugliness and difference from the original architect's renders for the building's renovation.

The 55-metre-tall New Walk Centre has been occupied by the City Council since the 1970s, while the Cardinal Telephone Exchange is occupied by British Telecom. The International Hotel has been an un-maintained eyesore for many years, and requires demolition or serious maintenance work as it is having a real impact on the image and success of the adjacent 'Cultural Quarter'.

== Geography ==
=== LE1 Postal district ===
The postal district LE1 is close to the area covered inside ring-road, but is somewhat larger. The only area inside the ring-road but not part of LE1 is the section of Humberstone Road inside the ring-road.

LE1 includes the St Matthew's estate, and extends as far north as the River Soar, thus including Abbey Park. Where the A50 crosses the Soar, the boundary runs south, including Great Central Street in LE1, but not the waterfront. It then broadly follows the path of the ring-road until it reaches Waterloo Way, where the border diverges substantially, to include the swathe of land between London Road, Victoria Park Road and Waterloo Way in the LE1 postcode, including the University of Leicester, the De Montfort Hall, Wyggeston and Queen Elizabeth I College, Regent College, the Welford Road cemetery, and Victoria Park. However, London Road station remains outside LE1.

The boundary then includes several streets west of the railway line but east of the ring-road as part of LE1, before meeting up with the roundabout again and then going inwards to exclude Humberstone Road from LE1 (as above).

=== Nearby places ===
To the west, the city centre borders the river, on the other side of this is the West End of Leicester. To the south-east it borders Highfields, to the east, St Matthew's, and to the north-east, Belgrave.
