= St Matthew's, Leicester =

Inner city suburb in Leicester, England

Coordinates: 52.641°N 1.123°W

St Matthew's is an inner city area of the city of Leicester in the United Kingdom. The area is informally north of the Leicester City Centre and is separated from the city centre by the A594 ring road. It is statistically the most deprived neighbourhood in Leicester today and the most income deprived neighbourhood in England (Indices of deprivation 2007).

It lies immediately to the northeast of the city centre and is defined by the A594 ring road to the southwest at the city centre, Belgrave Gate to the west between the city centre and the area of Belgrave and then Belgrave to the north at Dysart Way and Humberstone Road (A47) to the east at Highfields.

The area previously consisted of small factories and slum housing - much of it back-to-back houses - and was redeveloped in the 1950s as council housing. The majority of the housing stock is local authority-owned. The area is isolated, with no adjacent residential areas and is cut off from the city centre by the dual-carriageway ring road.
