= Southfields, Leicester =

Area in Leicester, United Kingdom

Coordinates: 52.625°N 1.125°W

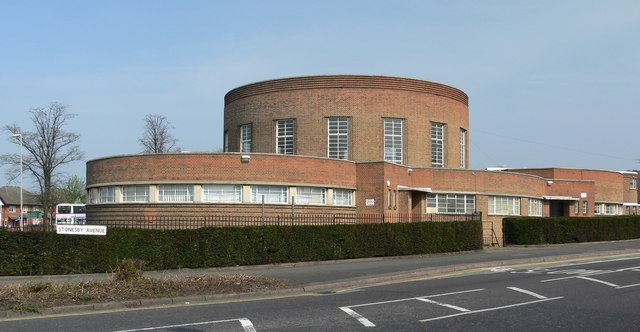
Southfields Library

The Southfields of Leicester, England consisted of common land south of the city, and now refers to the mostly-developed area immediately south of the city centre.

It is one of three such large fields that survive as placenames, the others being the Highfields and the Northfields. The field remained as common land until 1804 when it was controversially enclosed by the Corporation of Leicester, setting aside a part of the field as 'Freemen's' common for the use of freemen of the city. The Southfields were then developed in the 19th century, although some large open spaces still exist in the area - particularly Victoria Park, the Welford Road Cemetery, and Nelson Mandela Park.

The Southfields area also includes Southfields Library (grade II listed), HMP Leicester, the former Southfields College (now part of Leicester College), De Montfort Hall and the University of Leicester.
