= Jocasta Almgill =

British actress, singer and dancer

Jocasta Almgill is a British actress, singer and dancer. She is best known for playing Diana in A Chorus Line at London's Sadler's Wells , Lady Capulet in the original West End cast of & Juliet and Brooke Wyndham in the Uk tour of Legally Blonde.

== Early life and education ==
Almgill attended the Italia Conti Academy of Theatre Arts and graduated in 2009.

== Career ==
=== Musical Theatre ===
Almgill joined the original London production of In the Heights in 2015, as part of the ensemble and cover of some of the main characters.

In 2016, Almgill was part of the ensemble of Dreamgirls at the Savoy Theatre. The show starred Amber Riley as Effie White, with Tyrone Huntley as C.C. and Joe Aaron Reid as Curtis and was directed and choreographed by award winner Casey Nicholaw.

Almgill played the role of Yvonne in the 2018 musical version of The Proclaimers' Sunshine on Leith, joining Steven Miller and Paul-James Corrigan.

In 2019, Almgill joined the Royal Exchange production of West Side Story in the role of Anita, with Maria played by Gabriela Garcia and Tony by Andy Coxon.

After opening in Manchester, & Juliet opened at the Shaftesbury Theatre in the West End in November 2019. The cast included Miriam Teak-Lee as Juliet, Jordan Luke Gage as Romeo, David Bedella as Lance, Cassidy Janson as Anne Hathaway, Oliver Tompsett as Shakespeare, Melanie La Barrie as the Nurse, Arun Blair-Mangat as May, Tim Mahendran as Francois and Almgill as Lady Capulet.

In 2020, Almgill was part of the Hope Mill Theatre production of Rent, directed by Luke Sheppard, in the role of Joanne. Also cast were Tom Francis as Roger, Millie O'Connell as Maureen and Maiya Quansah-Breed as Mimi. The show was due to open in November 2020, but, after a few performances, it had to close due to a new COVID-19 lockdown in the UK. Hope Mill confirmed that a digital stream of the show, recorded during the first performances, would be made available for purchase.

Almgill joined the cast of Grease as Rizzo in 2022. The show was directed by Nikolai Foster and choreographed by Dame Arlene Phillips. Cast included Dan Partridge as Danny, Olivia Moore as Sandy with Peter Andre and Jason Donovan alternating in the role of Teen Angel.

In April 2024, casting for the Curve/Sadler's Wells production of A Chorus Line was announced, with Adam Cooper in the role of Zach, Carly Mercedes Dyer as Cassie and Almgill as Diana. The show played at both Curve and Sadler's Wells before embarking on a UK tour and it was directed by Nikolai Foster, Curve's Artistic Director.

== Credits ==
=== Stage ===
Year	Title	Role	Theatre
2013	Hairspray	Ensemble, Dynamite	UK tour
2013 - 2014	Chicago	Ensemble	Curve
2015	Ghost - the musical	Ensemble	Asian tour
2015 - 2016	In the Heights	Ensemble, u.s. Camila, Daniela and Vanessa	King's Cross Theatre
2016	Dreamgirls	Ensemble	Savoy Theatre
2018	Sunshine on Leith	Yvonne	Quarry Theatre
2019	West Side Story	Anita	Royal Exchange
2019	& Juliet	Lady Capulet / Nell	Shaftesbury Theatre
2020	Rent	Joanne	Hope Mill Theatre
2022	Grease	Rizzo	Dominion Theatre
2024	A Chorus Line	Diana Morales	Curve, Sadler's Wells and UK tour
2026	Legally Blonde (musical)	Brooke Windham	UK Tour

=== Film and TV ===
Year	Title	Role	Notes
2009	Harry Potter and the Half-Blood Prince		movie
2020	Hope Mill Theatre: Rent	Joanne	Live theatre streaming
2021	The Secret Society of Leading Ladies	Self	TV special
2023	Hullraisers	Meredith	TV series, 1 episode
2024	Wicked		movie

== Awards and nominations ==
Year	Work	Award	Category	Result	Ref.
2022	Grease	Black British Theatre Awards	Best Supporting Female Actor in a Musical	Nominated	
