= A594 road (Leicester) =

Road in Leicester

Coordinates: 52.6342°N 1.1235°W

A594
- Leicester Central Ring Road

Route information
- Length: 3.75 mi (6.04 km)

Major junctions
- Leicester Station; A6 A5199 A426; A47; A50; A6 A607; A47; Leicester Station

Location
- Country: United Kingdom
- Constituent country: England
- Primary destinations: Leicester

Road network
- Roads in the United Kingdom; Motorways; A and B road zones

The A594 Central Ring is Leicester's central distributor road network.

With the continuing regeneration of the inner city, the Central Ring has become a route within the city centre rather than one that encloses it; especially near the New Walk/Freemen's/University of Leicester and the Bede Island/Waterside/De Montfort University districts, to the south and west of the urban core respectively.

== Length and shape ==
The road's length is approximately 3.65 miles (5.87 km) anti-clockwise and 3.85 miles (6.20 km) clockwise due to divergent one-way routings to the southeast. Typical distances from the city centre at Every Street to the Central Ring are between 0.4 miles (0.6 km) and 1.2 miles (1.9 km).

The road is for the most part circular, but it forms a chevron pointing southwards as it merges into the A426 and A5199, Aylestone and Welford Roads. It is largely a dual-carriageway urban clear route. There are grade-separated junctions at the A607 (flyover/overpass) to the north and at the A47 (underpass) to the west.

== History ==
The inner ring road was constructed in stages in the 1960s/1970s. A 1974 map shows that the St Nicholas Circle had been constructed, as well as Vaughan Way and Burleys Way, to the junction with Belgrave Road.

The areas in which it was built had a pre-existing street pattern which it has somewhat disrupted. This may be seen most clearly in the eastern part of the ring road, which has severed streets like Bedford Street and Wharf Street into two sections, one in the city centre itself, and one in the nearby residential estate of St Matthew's, which has consequently become very isolated.

== Route ==
Starting in the east, with a roundabout, with exits to the east (the A47, and Humberstone Gate to the west), it passes south along St George's Way, until it joins the route of the London Road (the A6), and becomes Waterloo Way for a short distance. It then turns south-west, leaving the railway station on the outer side of the ring-road, and continues south-west, parallel to the railway line, crossing New Walk. Towards the end of this section, it nears Leicester Tigers ground, and a section of the old Waterloo Way near this end has been renamed Tigers Way.

It is here that the inner ring-road splits, with a one-way system causing clockwise and anticlockwise traffic to take different routes. The clockwise traffic uses Infirmary Road and then Oxford Street, passing by Leicester Royal Infirmary and De Montfort University, whilst anticlockwise traffic uses Welford Road and Newark Street.

West of the city centre, the two roads merge into the dual carriageway Vaughan Way. Just north of this is Saint Nicholas Circle, providing access into the old town and western retail core, and also west to the nearby bridge over the River Soar.

Southgates Underpass provides access for traffic going straight on at Saint Nicholas Circle, and joins up with Vaughan Way again at the north. Vaughan Way continues round, and then whilst heading north-east, becomes Burley's Way at the junction with the re-emerged A6, which heads north as St Margaret's Way in the direction of Loughborough.

Burley's Way then passes north-east over the Fosse Way junction roundabout (formerly the A46, now the A607, known locally as Belgrave Gate/Belgrave Road), with a flyover for continuing Central Ring traffic. It then becomes St Matthew's Way, before ending up at the St George's Way A47 roundabout described before.

== Ongoing development ==
As part of Leicester's regeneration, it was proposed to reconnect Wharf Street South and North with a cycle/foot/bus bridge.

A plan to move the ring road around the station as part of the regeneration of the old police station and Charles Street surrounding into a new business quarter was abandoned.

== See also ==
- A563 Leicester Ring Road
- A594 road (Cumbria)
