= Sue Townsend Theatre =

Theatre in Leicester

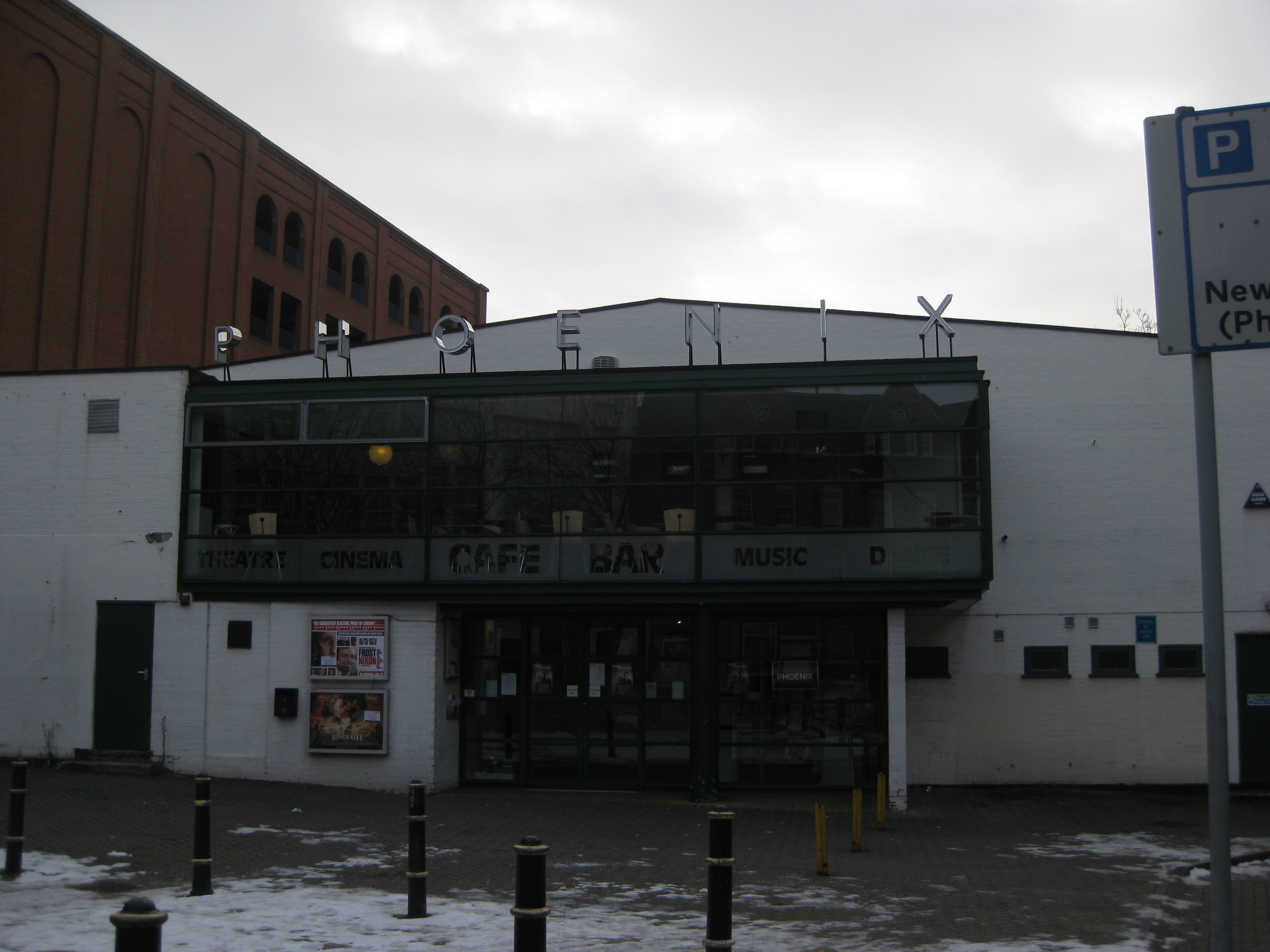
- The building in 2009
- Interactive map of Sue Townsend Theatre
- Former names: Phoenix Theatre (1963–1973); Phoenix Arts (1973–2010); Upper Brown Street Theatre (2010–2015)
- Location: Leicester, England, U.K.
- Coordinates: 52°37′52.50″N 1°8′6.50″W
- Capacity: 266
- Type: Contemporary music

Construction
- Groundbreaking: 1962 (64 years ago)
- Opened: 1963 (63 years ago)
- Renovated: 1988 (38 years ago)
- Expanded: 1988 (38 years ago)

Website
- Sue Townsend Theatre

Sue Townsend Theatre (formerly the Phoenix Theatre, Phoenix Arts Centre and the Upper Brown Street Theatre) is a theatre in the city of Leicester, England.

The centre hosts live shows and films of the arthouse and world cinema genres. Julian Wright is credited for his work to preserve the theatre from demolition in the 1980s and in the 2000s. In 2010, after a new Phoenix Square opened on the other side of the city centre, the space became the Upper Brown Street Theatre, a music-training and performance venue. It has since been renamed the Sue Townsend Theatre, to honour the late Leicester author and playwright, Sue Townsend.

== History ==
In 1963, Leicester City Council (LCC), identifying a gap in cultural provision for live performances, built a 262-seat theatre in Leicester, The Phoenix Theatre, intended as a temporary solution until a more permanent theatre could be built. The theatre's architect was Richard Bryant.

The theatre's roster of directors includes Clive Perry, Michael Bogdanov, Chris Martin, Ian Giles, Sue Pomeroy, Graham Watkins, Paul Wetherby and Adrian Bean, and actors such as Nigel Bennett, Roberta Kerr, Heather Sears, Perry Cree, Anthony Hopkins and Greta Scacci. The theatre was intended to serve the Leicester community by presenting both "in house" productions and touring companies, including dance and small-scale theatre productions for Leicestershire. Notable in the touring work were productions about the travelling community and about substance abuse.

The early 1980s were the theatre's most active period, when it employed some eighty people. The company included a main acting troupe, a touring company called "Flying Phoenix", and a touring dance company, "Phoenix Dance". It developed new writers, notably Sue Townsend, and premiered many productions that went on to national acclaim, such as The Hobbit and The Secret Diary of Adrian Mole. In the late 1980s and early 1990s, the theatre hosted annual revues performed by the Leicester University Revue & Theatre Society (R.A.T.S.), featuring cult comedy performers such as Nick "Tubby" Griffiths.

In 1973, a permanent theatre, the Haymarket Theatre, was built. Support for the Phoenix Theatre continued to keep it operational. It was renamed the Phoenix Arts Centre in 1973 and functioned alongside the Haymarket until 1987, when financial issues forced the LCC to reconsider its support. A decision to close the centre was averted in 1988 by support from Leicester Polytechnic (now De Montfort University) and the LCC, and while the Phoenix was no longer a producing theatre, it continued as a venue for contemporary art, film and live performances.

The Phoenix faced closure in the summer of 2009, to be replaced by a new building, Phoenix Square, in the Cultural Quarter of the city. However, local musician Julian Wright campaigned successfully to stop LCC from selling. In June 2009, the council asked for bids from arts groups for a five-year lease. Under the lease terms, films and professional theatre productions would not be permitted, so as not to compete with Phoenix Square and Leicester's new Curve Theatre, respectively. The winning bid, announced on 12 November, was made by a group comprising Leicester College and four local music promoters. Social enterprise organisation Leicester Stride, a major element in one of the other bids, was invited to play a part in the centre's future.

On 6 March 2010, the Leicester Mercury announced that the centre was renamed the Upper Brown Street campus of Leicester College. Leicester property developer Norman Gill gave £25,000 towards refurbishment through the Norman Gill Charitable Trust. The theatre re-opened in 2010. As well as performances from Leicester College and students in Performing Arts and Music and Sound courses, the Upper Brown Street venue hosts shows and acts from external performers.

In 2011, Upper Brown Street presented its first full-scale musical production, Hairspray. The production was created by Leicester College students. Prior to this, first-year students performed Stephen Sondheim's A Funny Thing Happened on the Way to the Forum.

In 2015, the theatre was re-branded as the Sue Townsend Theatre, which coincided with the opening of Curve's production of The Secret Diary of Adrian Mole. To honour the late playwright, students produced a version of Womberang.

== Productions, events and shows ==
=== Phoenix Theatre, 1963–1973 ===
- Opening production, 1963, The Matchmaker by Thornton Wilder, directed by Clive Perry
- Waiting for Godot written by Samuel Beckett, starring Kenneth Colley

=== Phoenix Arts Centre, 1973–2010 ===
- Mind Your (Midland Red) Head (1974) - written by Adrian Mitchell - directed by Michael Bogdanov
- Mr Gould's Victorian Gothic Leicester Folksong Follies (1974) - company devised, directed by Michael Bogdanov
- Billy Bodger's Magic Circus (1974) - show for 5-8 year olds, written and directed by Michael Bogdanov
- Hamlet (1975) - William Shakespeare - directed by Michael Bogdanov
- Tommy (1975) - The Who, rock opera - music arranged by the company, directed by Michael Bogdanov
- Dracula (1975) Bram Stoker, adapted by Phil Woods - directed by Michael Bogdanov
- The Canterbury Tales (1975) - Chaucer, adapted by Phil Woods - directed by Michael Bogdanov
- The Threepenny Opera (1976) - Bertolt Brecht - directed by Michael Bogdanov
- Gunslinger (1976) by Richard Crane, music by David Joss Buckley, directed by Michael Bogdanov
- Bernie's Barmy Garden (1976) show for 5-8 year olds, directed by Sue Pomeroy
- Sock Follies (1977) - touring production to community venues, company devised, directed by Jeff Teare
- Under Milk Wood (1977) - Dylan Thomas - directed by Michael Bogdanov
- Johnny Boxer (1977) by Phil Woods, directed by Michael Bogdanov
- Lucy in the Sky (1977) The Beatles, music arranged by the company. Directed by Michael Bogdanov. Performed in a circus tent in the theatre car park; theatre troupe took circus-training lessons and performed circus routines as part of the play. Play then transferred to the main house and later toured nationally.
- Billy Bodger's Jubilee Circus (1977) - show for 5-8 year olds, written by David Joss Buckley, directed by Sue Pomeroy
- Richard III (1977) - William Shakespeare, directed by Antonia Bird
- What the Butler Saw (1977), written by Joe Orton, directed by Antonia Bird
- No More Sitting on the Old School Bench (1979), written by Alan Bleasdale
- Killer on the Dance Floor (1980), written by Sue Townsend and Rod Thompson
- Little Brother, Little Sister (1981), written by David Campton
- The Ghost of Daniel Lambert (1981), written by Sue Townsend
- Captain Christmas and the Evil Adults (1982), written by Sue Townsend
- Mother Goose and Dancing Dan (1983), written by Paul Wetherby
- The Hobbit (1984), written by J. R. R. Tolkien, adapted by Rony Robinson and Graham Watkins; original score by Stephanie Nunn
- The Secret Diary of Adrian Mole, Aged 13¾ (1984), written by Sue Townsend
- The Joe Orton Project (2007)

=== Upper Brown Street Theatre, 2010–2015 ===
- A Funny Thing Happened on the Way to the Forum (2010)
- Hairspray (2011)
- The Lord of the Flies (2011)
- The Misanthrope (2011)
- My Fair Lady (2011)
- Ten Voices – Musical Cabaret (2011)
- Musical Stages (2012)
- Beauty and the Beast (2012)

=== Sue Townsend Theatre, since 2015 ===
- Womberang (2015)
- Curtain Call (2016)
- The 25th Annual Putnam County Spelling Bee (2017)

== Phoenix broadsheets ==
From the late 1970s, local letterpress printer Toni Savage, of The New Broom Press, took to distributing 8"×5" broadsheets through the theatre, and other channels. These were distributed freely rather than sold, and published a vast range of writers, local, obscure and sometimes well-known. Over 400 were printed into the 1990s. These broadsheets were later catalogued, released as a limited edition of 200 copies by a small press craft printer.
