= New Walk Centre =

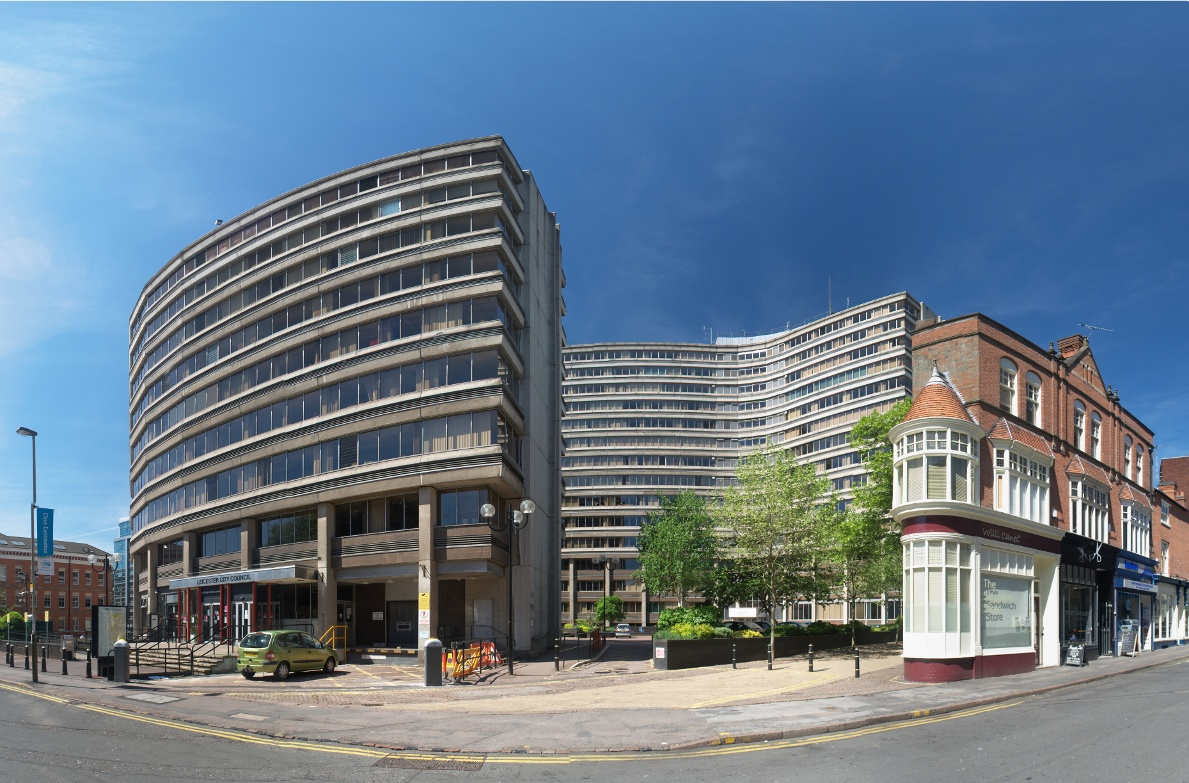
- New Walk Centre in 2010
- Interactive map of the New Walk Centre area

General information
- Location: Welford Place, Leicester, United Kingdom
- Coordinates: 52.63135°N 1.13311°W
- Opened: 1975
- Closed: 2014
- Demolished: 22 February 2015
- Owner: Leicester City Council

The New Walk Centre was a council office block in Leicester, United Kingdom, that was demolished on 22 February 2015.

The complex consisted of two towers, built in 1975 and owned by Leicester City Council. After they were declared unsafe in 2010, the buildings were demolished by Birmingham-based contractors DSM Demolition. The demolition was to make way for a new mixed use development, procured by Leicester City Council and completed in 2018.
