= Leicester Town Hall =

Municipal building in Leicester, Leicestershire, England

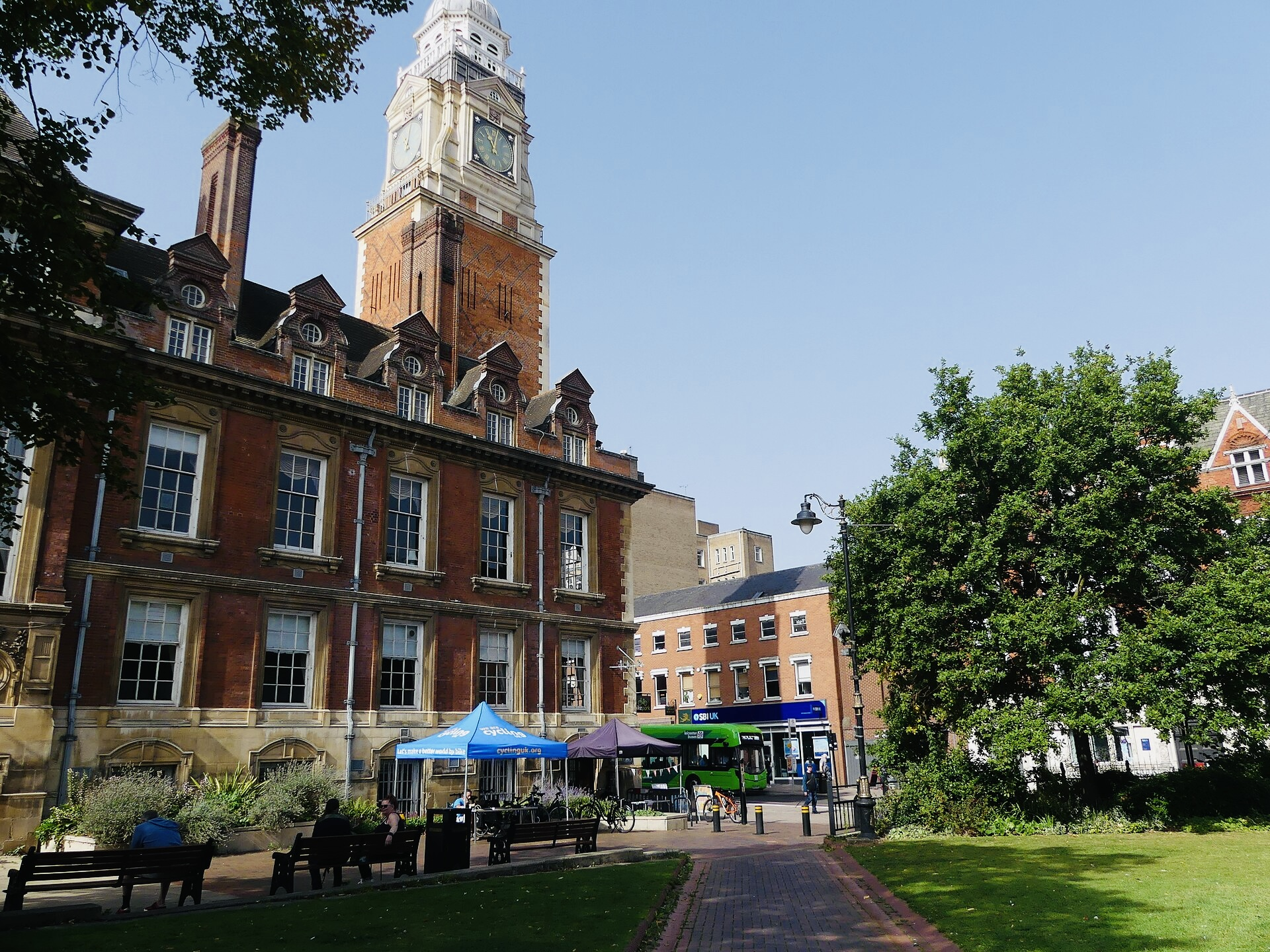
- Leicester Town Hall

- Shown in Leicestershire
- 52°38′0″N 1°7′57″W
- Location: Town Hall Square, Leicester

History
- Built: 1876

Site notes
- Architect: Francis Hames
- Architectural style: Queen Anne style

Listed Building – Grade II*
- Designated: 30 March 1972
- Reference no.: 1074780

Leicester Town Hall stands at Town Hall Square in the city centre of Leicester, England. The building, which is the meeting place of Leicester City Council, is a Grade II* listed building.

== History ==
Before the town hall was built, the Guildhall acted as the meeting place of the city council. After the civic leaders decided the guildhall was too small they selected the old cattle market as the site for the new building.

The foundation stone for the new building was laid on 3 August 1874. The new building was designed by Francis Hames in the Queen Anne style and was opened by the Mayor, Alderman William Barfoot, on 7 August 1876. The design, which made extensive use of Ketton stone, included a clock tower with cupola which is 44 metres (144 ft) high, containing a clock by E. T. Loseby of Leicester and five bells by Mears & Stainbank.

The building was extended in 1910 and again in 1924. A German bomb crashed through the town hall roof and fell through several floors to the basement without exploding on the night of 19/20 November 1940 during the Blitz.

The town hall was the headquarters of the county borough of Leicester until 1974 when, following local government reform, it became the meeting place of Leicester City Council.

Important works of art in the town hall include a painting by Charles James Adams depicting "The Ferry" and a painting by John Fulleylove depicting the "Interior of the Mosque of Omar, Jerusalem".

The main council offices are at City Hall on Charles Street, but council meetings continue to be held in the town hall in Town Hall Square.

== Town Hall Square ==
Leicester Town Council accepted on 29 October 1878, "a handsome ornamental fountain to be placed in the centre of the land fronting the Town Hall Buildings" which was a gift to the Borough from Sir Israel Hart, a former Mayor of Leicester. It is constructed of bronze-painted cast iron, Shap granite and Ross of Mull granite. Francis Hames, the architect of the town hall, also designed the layout of Town Hall Square and the fountain, which was unveiled by Sir Israel Hart on 24 September 1879. It is said to be based on a similar fountain Hames saw at Porto in Portugal, although this is unlikely, as the Town Hall Square fountain is the earlier work (1879, with the Fountain of the Lions in Porto installed in 1886 after a design competition in 1880). There are very strong similarities, which suggests that the Val d’Osne foundry copied the Leicester fountain for the Porto installation.

Also located in the Town Hall Square is the Second Boer War Memorial which was sculpted by Joseph Crosland McClure and unveiled by Field Marshal Lord Grenfell on 1 July 1909.
