= Leicester Athena =

Event venue in Leicester, England

Coordinates: 52°38′7.0″N 1°7′37.3″W

Athena
- Athena in September 2026
- Interactive map of Athena
- Former names: Leicester Odeon
- Address: Queen Street; Leicester LE1 1QD; England
- Location: Leicester
- Capacity: 2,000
- Type: Early 20th century art deco cinema

Construction
- Built: 1936
- Opened: 1936-1997, 2005 – present
- Renovated: 2005
- Architect: Robert Arthur Bullivant (architect)

Website
- Venue Website

Athena is a Grade II-listed events venue in the cultural quarter of Leicester City Centre, England. Built originally as an Odeon Cinema in 1936, it closed for most of the 1990s and remained vacant up until 2005, where the building was restored as a multi-discipline events venue.

== History ==
The building was originally designed and built in 1936 in the Streamline Moderne style by Robert Arthur Bullivant, and operated as an Odeon Cinema. When it was first opened, the Odeon was one of the most extravagant and largest buildings in the region, with one screen and seating 2,182 guests. The terracotta panels, which feature mermaids, were hand-moulded by William Neatby at the Lambeth premises of Doulton and Co.

The cinema was opened on 28 July 1938 with a screening of A Slight Case of Murder. Seating was provided for 1,307 in the stalls and 875 in the upper circle.

In 1974 it became a three screen cinema when the original auditorium was subdivided. The main Screen 1, located in the circle and front stalls, became a 1,237 seat screen, allowing for two smaller screens, 2 and 3, underneath the circle of the rear stalls which seated 123 and 111.

In 1988 a fourth screen was added by converting the remaining front stalls into a 401 seat screen.

The original Odeon closed on 16 July 1997 when the twelve screen Odeon multiplex opened at Freemans Park. The building has been Grade II listed since August 1997, giving it protection from unauthorised modification or demolition.

The building has been restored and converted into a venue for corporate and social events.

== Today ==
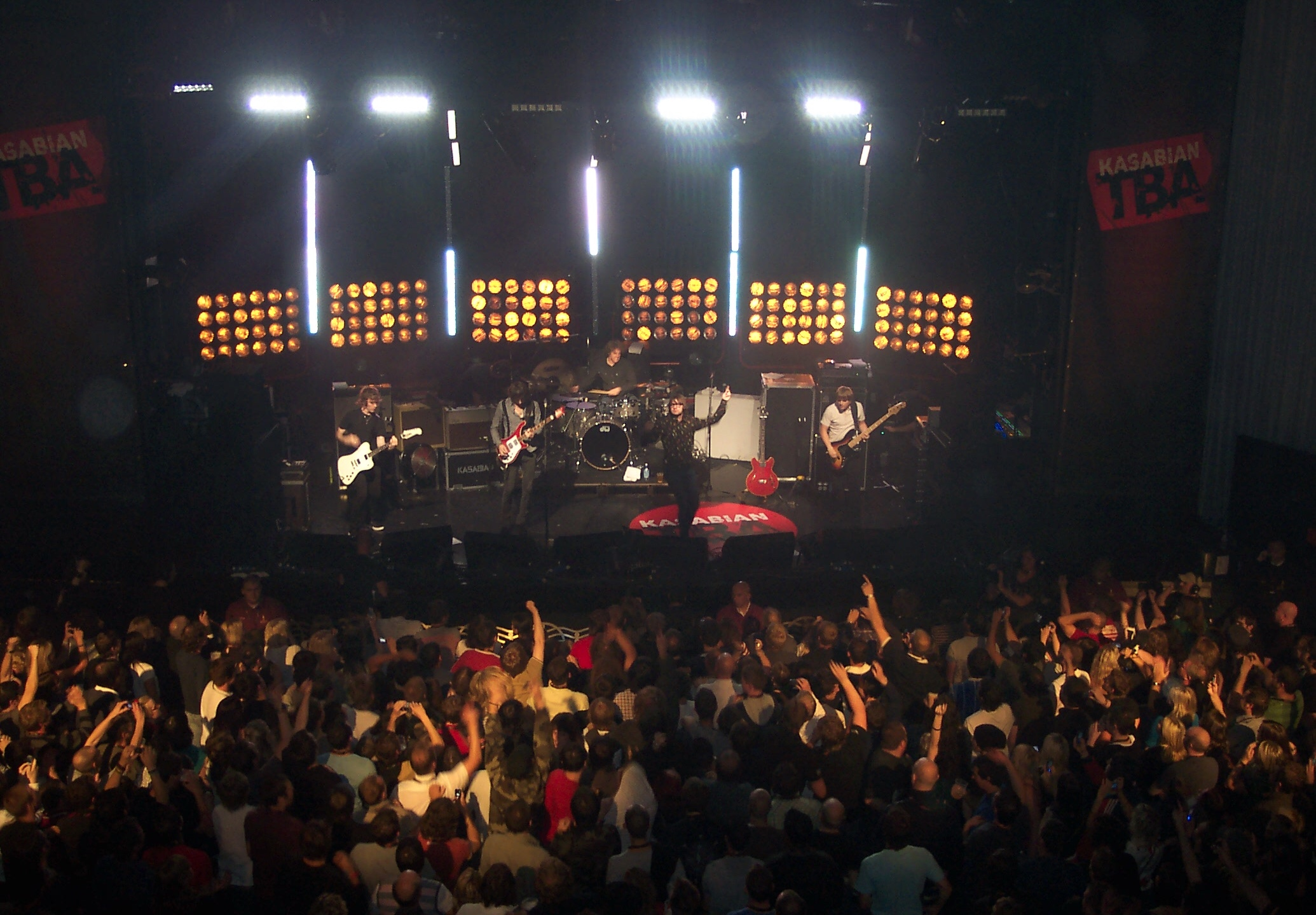
Leicester band Kasabian headline concert at Athena

Since re-opening in 2005, Athena has been host to artists including Olly Murs, Kasabian, Oliver Mtukudzi, X Factor Live shows, Roy Chubby Brown and Jim Davidson.

== Awards ==
In 2017, Athena received a Silver award at the Awards Awards in the category for Best Awards Venue, and in the same year, was a finalist at The Drum UK Event Awards.

In 2018 it picked up two awards at the National Venue Awards, receiving another Silver award for Best Awards Ceremony Venue and being named winner of the Best Event Venue for 500–1000 Guests category.
