= Highfields, Leicester =

Area of Leicester, England

Coordinates: 52.630°N 1.118°W

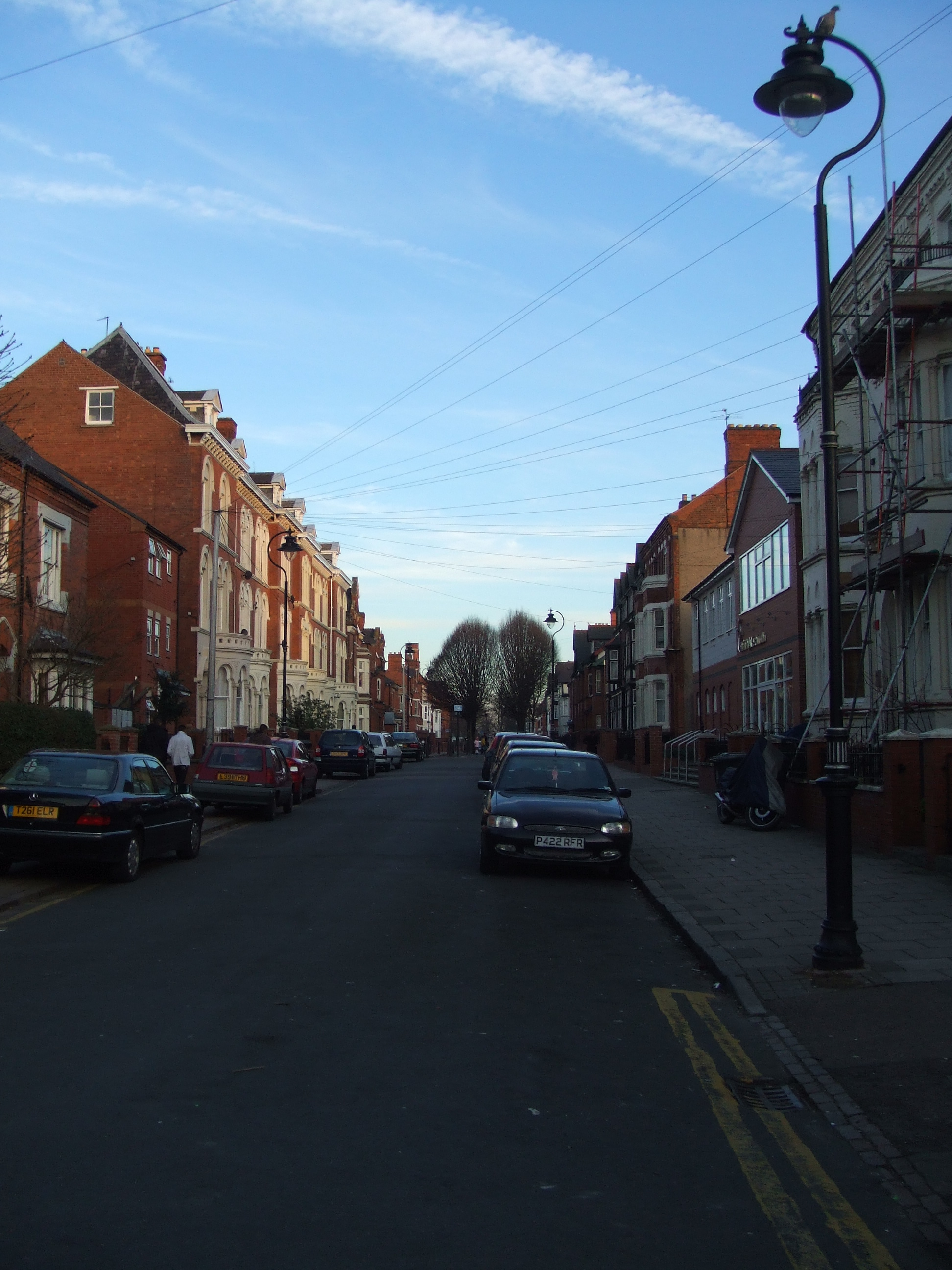
Tichbourne Street in Highfields, in 2008

Highfields is an inner city area of Leicester, England. It is one of the highest areas in the city, on high ground southeast of the city centre. To the west the area is bounded by the Midland Main Line, to the south by London Road (A6), and to the east by East Park Road. To the north is Spinney Hills, though there is no clear boundary between the two areas, and Spinney Hills (which extends northwards to Humberstone Road) is often considered to be part of Highfields. The neighbourhood is within walking distance of the city centre of Leicester and offers many amenities for religious, social, cultural and commercial activities. The population is split between the Spinney Hills, Wycliffe and Stoneygate wards of the Leicester City Council.

A section of the area running between London Road, Evington Road and St Peter's Road was designated as the South Highfields Conservation Area in April 1981. This conservation area originally had an area of approximately 22.20 hectares. The boundaries of the conservation area were reassessed in 2003, and it was reduced to approximately 20.55 hectares.

Highfields is bounded by London Road and Evington Road meaning that it has a large amount of amenities on its doorstep. Notably this includes the railway station, many Mosques (the biggest includes a leisure centre within its grounds), Churches, Temples, a modern health centre, nurseries, schools, local shops, restaurants, community centres and banks. The area also has a public library which is located on Melbourne Road.

== Community centres and groups ==
The area is also notable for having a large number of well developed community institutions which represent the whole community and sections of it.

- African Caribbean Centre
- Leicester Community Radio (94.1fm, 1449 AM) is based at St Peter's Church, Highfields and is committed to providing a significant number of hours per week of programming dedicated for the Afro-Caribbean Community
- Highfields Association of Residents and Tenants (HART) is pledged to improve the area of Highfields and holds regular meetings to organise and represent the area's residents.
- Highfields Youth and Community Centre: opened in 1974 as a community centre, to enable the Highfields Community Association (HCA) to provide social and recreational activities for local residents. Over the years, the centre's work has developed and progressed to offering a full range of lifelong and community development services. The centre was modernised in 2004, and houses facilities where functions, occasions and events take place. After local government budget cuts in 2010, Leicester City Council handed over running of the centre to HCA, with an underlying business plan to enable the centre to become "self-sustaining", enabled by a grant initially of £293,000pa. Ever since, HCA have been embroiled in a disagreement with the city council. In July 2015, elected Mayor of Leicester Peter Soulsby signed an agreement to end funding to HCA in March 2016 due to a number of reasons, including lack of a business plan and the centre being "significantly under-used".
- Melbourne Centre on Melbourne Road which was formerly a Polish school. The front of this building was redeveloped for use as a health centre in the early 2000s while the rear of the building is quite run down in parts and in use by a number of organisations and businesses such as ACCF and Olies Caribbean Kitchen.
- Muslim Khatri Association (MKA) was established in 1982 as the UK Khatri Welfare Centre. Early work consisted mainly of translation, interpretation, funerals, social gatherings and marriage counselling. However, due to the changing needs of the community, the centre has evolved to its present form with 2 workers. The MKA works to empower the South Asian communities and local residents to confront some of the problems they may experience including unemployment, poor housing in inner city areas, racial abuse and cultural alienation with a particular focus on the needs of women and children.
- South Highfields Neighbours
- St Peter's Neighbourhood Management Board engaged support of residents and service providers to address neighbourhood issues in health, employment, education, as well as housing and Leicester City Council neighbourhood management problems. In making pioneering use of the internet by publishing high resolution photo slideshows and videos of neighbourhood issues such as littering, criminal damage and flytipping they attracted a small degree of criticism but overall widespread general support for their methods. In particular for its decision to broadcast residents' own video footage of anti-social behaviour (litter louts, louts vandalising a parked car and a graffiti vandal) over the internet on their website in order to highlight the issues, to identify those involved or / and create a deterrent effect.
- St Peter's Community Centre
- The Leicester Hebrew Congregation, Highfield Street

== Schools ==
The area has a number of schools including:-

- Medway Community Primary School
- Uplands
- Sparkenhoe
- Highfields
- Shenton
- Charnwood
- Moat Community College
- Bridge School
- Sacred Heart RC School

== Policing ==
The area is policed by the Leicestershire Constabulary. The closest police station to the area is situated on East Park Road on the corner of Spinney Hill Park. The Spinney Hill Park area is divided into a number of neighbourhood beats. The Highfields Area is largely covered by the Highfields and Spinney Hill beats.

== Political representation ==
As a part of the city of Leicester, the area is governed by Leicester City Council. The Highfields area is represented by the Spinney Hills and Stoneygate wards.

Current councillors representing the Spinney Hills ward:

- Misbah Batool (Labour)
- Mustafa Malik (Labour)

Current councillors representing the Stoneygate ward:

- Aasiya Bora (Green)
- Raffiq Moosa Mohammed (Labour)
- Yasmin Surti (Labour)

The area is part of the Leicester South constituency.

== History ==
=== Nineteenth century ===
In the early nineteenth century, Highfields was a rural area lying outside of the city of Leicester. "Known as High Fields, the area was rich in water sources and windmills". This area of farm land was reached by short lanes that led off of London Road. The layout and width of Mill Hill Lane still survives much in the form that it took in the 1820s, although the housing was not built until the 1850s. Prebend Street and Saxby Street also formed two of these lanes that led from London Road to farms although both of these roads have been widened since.

The 1820s saw the beginnings of the development of the area as a residential district. First to be developed were Glebe Street, Conduit Street and Prebend Street and No 20 Glebe Street remains as one of the oldest surviving houses in the area. By this time there were already a few large villas on the London Road (e.g. 78–82). The Collegiate School on College Street was built in 1835.

The first terraced houses were built in Lincoln Street, Hobart Street and Seymour Street in the 1860s. By the 1870s, although much of the area east of London Road was still open fields, a large house (Highfields House) had been built and the area between Highfield Street and Mill Hill Lane had been developed (Maps 3 and 4). Houses facing London Road were mainly built between the mid-1850s and the late 1860s and most still remain, although all have been converted to commercial uses.

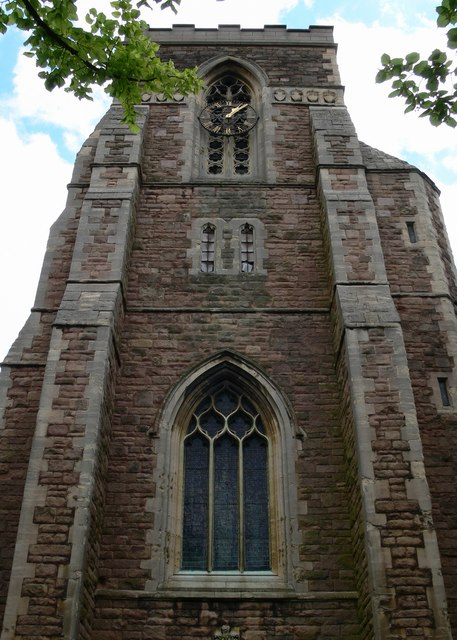
St Peter's Church, St Peter's Road

Substantial houses continued to be built as the area expanded southwards until the 1880s. Several streets were named after Prince Albert, the Prince Consort's family, but were renamed during the 1st World War; Saxe Coburg (now Saxby) Street was built between 1872 and 1881, Gotha (now Gotham) Street between 1877 and 1887 and Mecklenburg (now Severn) Street between 1875 and 1888. Places of worship were also built to cater for the growing population. In 1874 St Peter's Anglican Church was consecrated on St Peter's Road opposite the end of Highfields Street. The building was designed by the renowned architect George Edmund Street who was also responsible for the Courts of Justice in London. The Society of Friends opened a Meeting House at the corner of Glebe Street and Prebend Street in 1876 and, by 1886, several more places of worship had been built - a Congregational Chapel on London Road, a Wesleyan Church and Sunday school on the corner of Saxby Street and Sparkenhoe Street and the Victoria Road Baptist (now Seventh Day Adventist) Church and Sunday school at the corner of London Road and Victoria (now University) Road.

By the 1880s, land prices were high and small residential enclaves such as Woodbine and Gordon Avenues were built in 1884 with only footpath access to make the maximum profitable use of the land. This also occurred between Prebend Street and College Street, creating College Avenue in 1886 and Brookhouse Avenue in 1888 and between Gotham Street and London Road, creating Victoria Avenue (1889), on part of the site of an earlier large villa and garden ('The Chestnuts'). These pedestrian enclaves give the area a unique feel. However, the development of Stoneygate began to attract the middle classes away from Highfields and demand for larger houses declined. Development was completed by the construction of smaller terraced houses on Churchill, Connaught and Hamilton Streets (1886–1888).

In 1898, the respected local architect Arthur Wakerley designed the Highfield Street synagogue. This place of worship served a newly established Jewish community that was beginning to settle in the area.

=== Twentieth century ===
Since completion of the Victorian suburb, there has been no wholesale redevelopment of the area and so much of it still looks as it would have done in the nineteenth century. The main changes have been the loss of front gardens on the west side of London Road (and most of those on the east side) for highway use and the wholesale conversion of buildings on both sides of London Road into shops and offices.

==== 1920s and 1930s ====
The 1920s and 1930s saw some continued development and redevelopment in the area. Offices and businesses were built on Nelson Street, whilst new shops and offices were built on London Road (55–57) in the Art-deco style in 1935.

Most of the original houses between Conduit Street and Prebend Street, including the Congregational chapel, gave way to 3 and 4-storey offices and showrooms between the 1930s and 1960s. Further along London Road, Nos. 132 to 140 were replaced by offices with a large setback from the street frontage to accommodate road-widening which never took place.

Before and during the Second World War, the Jewish community expanded, with evacuees and refugees from Europe; a Polish and Latvian community began to be established.

==== Second World War ====
The area was badly bombed during the Second World War. The worst night of bombing took place on 19 November 1940, with high-explosive bombs and incendiaries falling across the area between the Old Horse and the city centre. This night is often referred to as Leicester's Blitz. Several buildings at the corner of Highfield Street and Tichborne Street were destroyed and 41 people killed at this site (now occupied by Trinity Life Church in a community hall and ex-garage). On the same night a number of bombs fell on Sparkenhoe Street destroying homes, the local Post Office and the Methodist Church on the corner of Saxby Street and killing two people. Fragments of the bomb which destroyed the Methodist Church also damaged St Peter's Church, passing through the West window, bouncing several times before becoming embedded in the high altar. This was the city's largest of at least 8 recorded enemy raids between September 1940 – July 1942, where 122 people died in total and 284 recorded as seriously injured. Among those killed on that night were 12 members of the Royal Army Pay Corps who were billeted in the area.

It is recorded that one of the Luftwaffe's largest of bombs was dropped on Grove Road (the 1000 kg Parachute Mine), causing extensive damage to adjacent streets. It is still possible to trace the paths of the bombs by looking at the areas of post-1950s building that have gone on in the area. More recently, some infill development has taken place, such as De Montfort Mews behind 5 to 19 De Montfort Street, Andrew Court and Tichborne Court flats (late 1970s) and the bank at 121 to 123 London Road (1973/4). In 1999, a bank was built to replace a 1960s office block on the corner of Saxby Street and London Road.

==== Post-War Highfields ====
After the war the area became less desirable as the trend towards suburban living encouraged many residents to move out to the outskirts of the city. The area became characterised by lodging houses and poor quality rented accommodation and this attracted a succession of migrants to make their homes in the area. In the post-war period these incomers were largely Irish migrants. The post-war period also saw the migration of ex-servicemen and workers from the Caribbean to the area.

The post-war period also saw the first South Asian migrants moving to the area. This first wave of South Asian migrants who came directly were Pakistani, Punjabi and Gujarati in response to the demand for unskilled labour during the post war economic boom. Most of these migrants were men from rural areas where unemployment levels were high. Upon arrival in Leicester they formed a tight-knit community and in order to maximise their ability to save, these groups established lodging houses in the Highfields area of Leicester.

==== 1970s ====
During the early 1970s and especially after 1972, a large number of the Asian community in East Africa began to move to the area following expulsion from Uganda by Idi Amin. This group migrated in large numbers over a relatively short period of time and it quickly became apparent that Highfields was not going to be able to accommodate the entire East African Asian population.

These immigrants differed from the earlier direct migrants from Gujarat and the Punjab who had settled in Leicester. Perhaps the most important difference was that many of them were refugees and involuntary migrants. In addition to their strong trading, business and professional backgrounds and good knowledge of English, the Asians settled in East Africa tended to arrive as complete families, including ageing parents and relatives. As a result, their housing needs and aspirations differed significantly from those predominately single migrants from other countries. And some were able to bring some, if not all of their savings. This ensured that these new migrants were quickly in a position to purchase much of the available housing in the Highfields area. However, Highfields did not have sufficient capacity and the Asians arriving from East Africa became centred in Belgrave.

==== 1980s ====
On 10 July 1981 a riot broke out in the area as part of a wave of riots that were sweeping the country. These riots had a range of causes but to some extent were a protest about perceived discrimination and acute disadvantage. Lord Scarman found the riots that took place across the country to be communal disorders with a racial dimension.
