= Leicester City Council =

English local authority

Coordinates: 52.6313°N 1.1334°W

- Coat of arms

- Council logo

Type
- Type: Unitary authority

Leadership
- Lord Mayor: Kulwinder Singh Johal, Labour since 14 May 2026
- City Mayor: Peter Soulsby, Labour since 9 May 2011
- Chief operating officer: Alison Greenhill since 1 March 2021

Structure
- Seats: 1 executive mayor 54 councillors
- Graph of the party split among 54 seats.
- Political groups: Administration (31) Labour (31) Other parties (22) Conservative (15) Green (4) Liberal Democrat (3) Independent (1)
- Length of term: Executive mayor elected every four years Whole council elected every four years

Elections
- Voting system: Plurality-at-large (Note: First-past-the-post for by-elections) (councilllors)
- Voting system: Supplementary vote (Mayor)
- Last election: 4 May 2023
- Next election: 6 May 2027

Meeting place
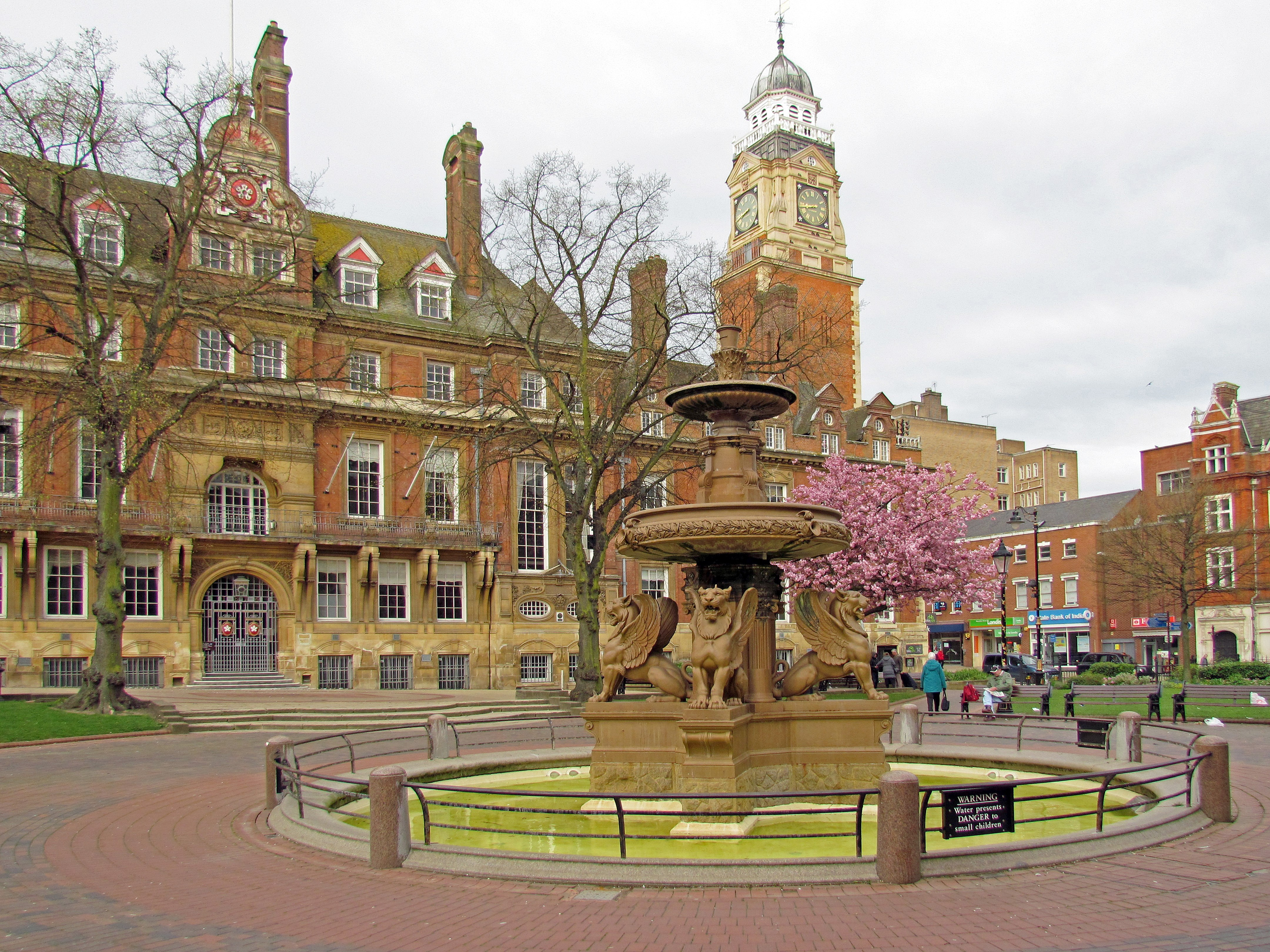
- Town Hall, Town Hall Square, Leicester, LE1 9BG

Website
- leicester.gov.uk

Leicester City Council is the local authority for the city of Leicester, in the ceremonial county of Leicestershire, England. Leicester has had a council from medieval times, which has been reformed on numerous occasions.

The current Leicester City Council was created in 1974 as a lower-tier district council. Since 1997 it has been a unitary authority, being a district council which also performs the functions of a county council; it is independent from Leicestershire County Council.

The council consists of 54 councillors, overseen by a directly elected mayor. The council also appoints a ceremonial Lord Mayor who chairs council meetings; the directly elected mayor is termed the City Mayor to distinguish the post from the Lord Mayor. The council has been under Labour majority control since 2007, and the City Mayor has been Sir Peter Soulsby since 2011. The council meets at Leicester Town Hall and has its main offices at City Hall on Charles Street.

The current Leicester City Council is planned to be abolished on 1 April 2028 and replaced by a new Leicester Council, under expanded boundaries.

== History ==
The council traces its roots to the Corporation of Leicester, and before then to the Merchant Gild and the Portmanmoot. The Portmanmoot consisted of 24 Jurats, elected from the burgesses (members of the Gild Merchant, or freemen), along with two bailiffs, and a clerk. It appears to have existed before the Norman Conquest in 1066. In 1209, the lead member of the Portmanmoot, the Alderman, became known as a mayor. The Gild Merchant and the Moot overlapped in membership and had probably become effectively merged in the 14th century. Membership of the Twenty-Four appears to have been by co-option, chosen by themselves.

Traditionally, the general populace attended some meetings of the Moot and Guild, but this was restricted to burgesses in 1467. Later, in 1489, this changed to a system where the Mayor and the Twenty-Four chose Forty-Eight burgesses to represent the others, and the Twenty-Four and the Forty-Eight would govern jointly.

After doubts as to the ability of the Moot and Gild to hold property arose in the 16th century, the corporation was formed, replacing the Gild and Portmanmoot, in 1589. A second charter was granted in 1599, reconfirming this, to The Mayor, Bailiffs and Burgesses of the Borough of Leicester. The 24 Jurats became known as the Aldermen of the corporation, and the 48 other Burgesses as the Common Council. The members of the Corporation chose the burgesses to send to the House of Commons.

Leicester was reformed to become a municipal borough in 1836 under the Municipal Corporations Act 1835, which standardised how most boroughs across the country were governed. The borough was then led by a corporate body formally called the "mayor, aldermen and burgesses of the borough of Leicester", which was generally known as the corporation or town council. The previous system of co-option for members of the council was replaced with elections by rate-payers. This led to a prolonged spell of Liberal control of the council. When elected county councils were established in 1889, Leicester was considered large enough for its existing corporation to provide county-level services, and so it was made a county borough, independent from Leicestershire County Council.

In 1919 Leicester was awarded city status, after which the corporation was formally called the "mayor, aldermen and citizens of the city of Leicester", also known as the city council. In 1928 the council was given the right to appoint a Lord Mayor.

The city boundaries were enlarged on a number of occasions as the urban area grew, notably in 1935 and 1966.

== Leicester City Council (1974–2028) ==
The corporation was replaced in 1974 under the Local Government Act 1972, with the modern Leicester City Council, a non-metropolitan district council. This was a lower tier district-level authority, with county-level services being provided to the city by Leicestershire County Council for the first time. Leicester kept the same boundaries (which had last been adjusted in 1969) at the time of the 1974 reforms.

In 1997, Leicester City Council regained responsibility for county-level services from Leicestershire County Council as part of the 1990s UK local government reforms. The way this change was implemented was to create a new non-metropolitan county of Leicester covering the same area as the existing district, but with no separate county council; instead the existing city council took on county functions, making it a unitary authority. This therefore had the effect of restoring the city council to the powers it had held when Leicester was a county borough prior to 1974.

In 2011, the position of directly elected mayor was created, without a referendum, to provide political leadership for the council. The directly elected mayor is called the City Mayor to distinguish the post from the continuing position of Lord Mayor. The Lord Mayor acts as a ceremonial figurehead for the city and chairs council meetings, with the position usually being held by a different councillor each year.

=== Governance ===
As a unitary authority, Leicester City Council provides both county-level and district-level services. Some services are provided via joint committees with other councils, notably the Leicestershire Fire and Rescue Service and Leicestershire Constabulary, which are run by joint boards of the city council with Leicestershire County Council and Rutland County Council. There are no civil parishes in the city.

=== Political control ===
The council has been under Labour majority control since 2007.

Political control of the council since the 1974 reforms took effect has been as follows:

Non-metropolitan district

Party in control	Years
Labour	1974–1976
Conservative	1976–1979
Labour	1979–1997

Unitary authority

Party in control	Years
Labour	1997–2003
No overall control	2003–2007
Labour	2007–present

=== Leadership ===
Political leadership is provided by the directly elected Mayor of Leicester. The separate post of Lord Mayor is the council's ceremonial figurehead and chairs full council meetings. Prior to 2011 political leadership was provided by the leader of the council. The leaders from 1974 to 2011 were:

Councillor	Party	From	To
Jim Marshall	Labour	1 Apr 1974	Oct 1974
Ken Middleton	Labour	Oct 1974	May 1976
Michael Cufflin	Conservative	May 1976	May 1979
Ken Middleton	Labour	May 1979	Nov 1981
Peter Soulsby	Labour	1981	Apr 1994
Stewart Foster	Labour	Apr 1994	29 Nov 1995
Peter Soulsby	Labour	Dec 1995	1999
Ross Willmott	Labour	1999	May 2003
Roger Blackmore	Liberal Democrats	22 May 2003	25 Nov 2004
Ross Willmott	Labour	25 Nov 2004	19 May 2005
Roger Blackmore	Liberal Democrats	19 May 2005	May 2007
Ross Willmott	Labour	17 May 2007	25 Mar 2010
Veejay Patel	Labour	25 Mar 2010	May 2011

Since 2011, the directly elected mayor has been:

Mayor	Party	From	To
Peter Soulsby	Labour	9 May 2011	

=== Composition ===
Following the 2023 election, subsequent changes of allegiances, and a 2026 by-election, the composition of the council, excluding the City Mayor's seat, was:

Party	Councillors
Labour	31
Conservative	15
Green	4
Liberal Democrats	3
Independent	1
Total	54

=== Elections ===
Since the last boundary changes in 2015 the council has comprised 54 councillors representing 21 wards with each ward electing two or three councillors. Elections are held every four years, with the election for the mayor and council being held together.

The wards are:

Ward	Councillors	Notes
Abbey	3	from Abbey Park up to Stocking Farm and Mowmacre Hill
Aylestone	2	Aylestone Village, Gilmorton estate, part of Aylestone Park, Aylestone Meadows, one side of Saffron Lane from the Porkpie roundabout to Knighton Lane and Aylestone Road/Lutterworth Road from Grace Road to the county border at Glen Parva.
Beaumont Leys	3	
Belgrave	3	most of the Belgrave area
Braunstone Park & Rowley Fields	3	including most of Braunstone
Castle	3	city centre, Southfields, Clarendon Park
Evington	3	
Eyres Monsell	2	
Fosse	2	
Humberstone & Hamilton	3	including Nether Hall
Knighton	3	
North Evington	3	
Rushey Mead	3	Most of the Rushey Mead estate and parts of the Belgrave area
Saffron	2	
Spinney Hills	2	including parts of Highfields
Stoneygate	3	also including parts of Highfields
Thurncourt	2	The Thurnby Lodge estate
Troon	2	The Northfields estate, parts of the former Charnwood ward and a small part of the Rushey Mead area
Westcotes	2	
Western	3	The New Parks estate
Wycliffe	2	St Matthew's estate and part of Highfields

A new set of wards and ward boundaries came into effect for the 7 May 2015 council elections. Wards that previously existed and were abolished are Charnwood, Coleman, Freeman, Latimer, New Parks and Western Park.

The previous ward boundaries were adopted for the 2003 local elections. Prior to this, there had been 28 wards, each electing 2 members. Wards that had existed and been abolished were Crown Hills, East Knighton, Mowmacre, North Braunstone, Rowley Fields, Saffron, St Augustine's, West Humberstone, West Knighton and Wycliffe.

== Leicester Council proposal ==
Leicester Council is a proposed unitary authority for Leicester, under expanded boundaries and replacing the existing Leicester City Council as well as Oadby and Wigston Borough Council and parts of Blaby District Council, Charnwood Borough Council, and Harborough District Council. It is expected to have a leader and cabinet model of government, in contrast to Leicester's existing model of having an elected Mayor of Leicester. It would have 91 councillors.

As part of the Starmer ministry local government reform, a goal of "simpler local government structures" was set out by the government, including a commitment to phase out two-tier local government structures.

The first Leicester Council election was set to take place on 6 May 2027, with the authority initially functioning as a shadow council taking over local government responsibilities on 1 April 2028. On 16 July 2026, the government announced its decision for new authorities to replace the existing councils in Leicestershire. Plans for the reorganisation were paused, and the 2027 elections for new authorities cancelled, on 7 September 2026.

== Premises ==
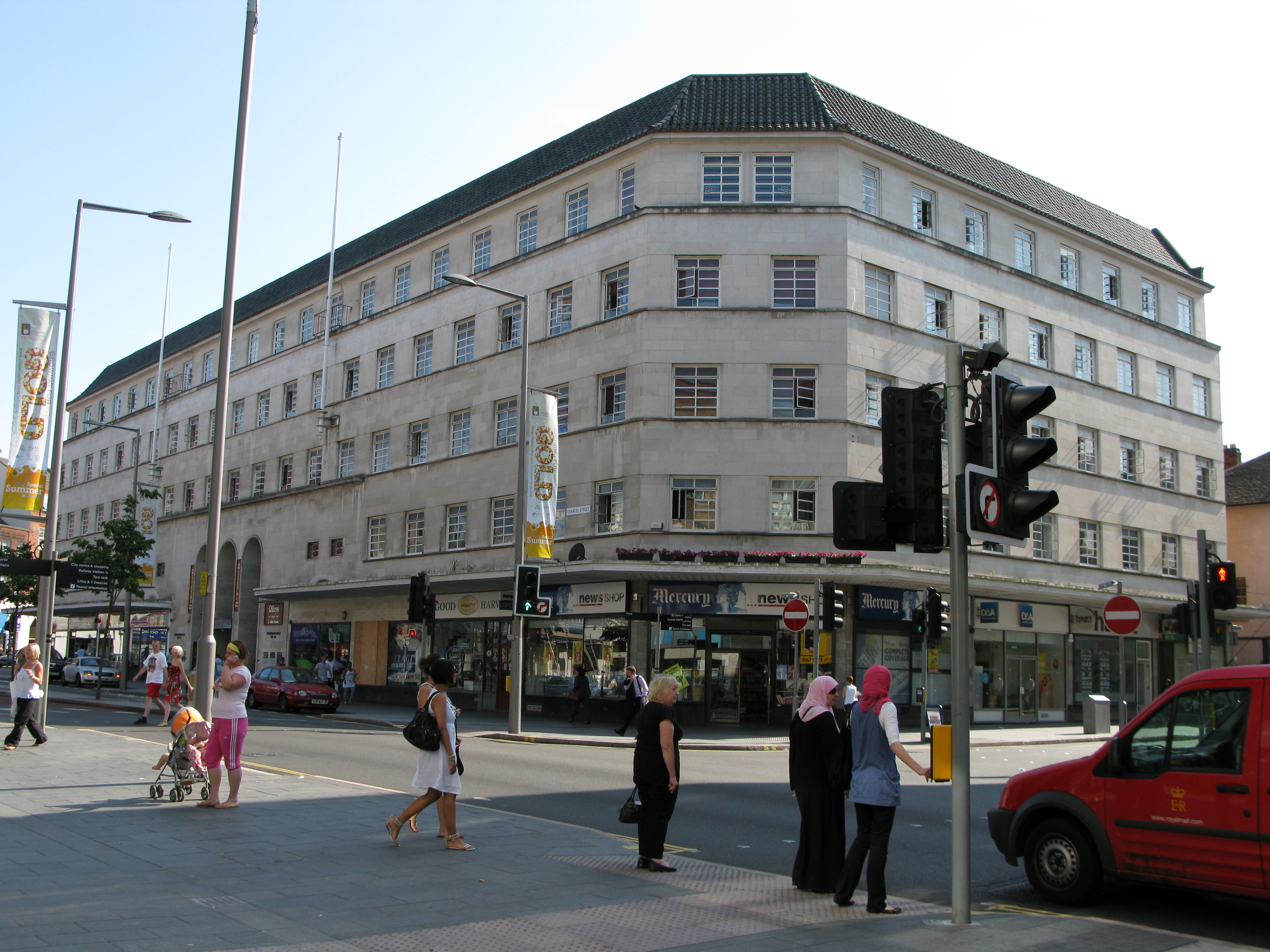
Council's main offices: City Hall, 115 Charles Street, Leicester, LE1 1FZ

The council has its main offices at City Hall on Charles Street, which was built in 1938, previously being called Municipal Buildings and Attenborough House until it was renamed City Hall in 2014.

Council meetings are held at Leicester Town Hall on Town Hall Square, which was completed in 1876.

Between 1975 and 2014 the council had its main offices at the New Walk Centre, which has since been demolished.

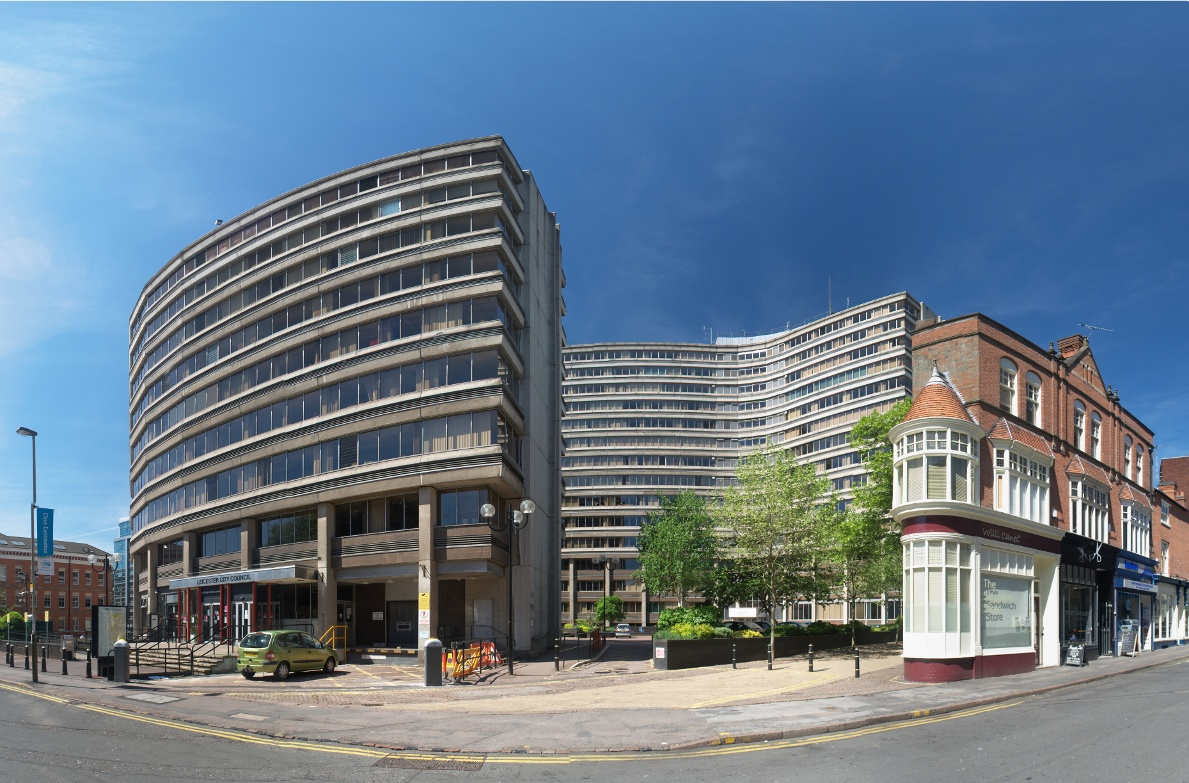
New Walk Centre, former council offices that were demolished in 2015

== Coat of arms ==
Coat of arms of Leicester City Council
Notes Arms and crest granted in 1619, supporters in 1926. Crest On a wreath of the colours a wyvern sans legs Argent strewed with wounds Gules wings expanded Ermine. Escutcheon Gules a cinquefoil pierced Ermine. Supporters On either side a lion reguardant Gules gorged with a ducal coronet suspended therefrom by a chain Or a cinquefoil Ermine pierced Gules. Motto Semper Eadem ('Always The Same')
