= New Walk =

New Walk was a high quality poetry and arts print magazine published at Leicester University, Leicester, England, but with a national and international focus. The magazine was established in 2010 and closed in 2017. It was edited by Rory Waterman and Nick Everett, with the fiction edited by Libby Peake. New Walk mainly published poetry, but also included poetry book reviews, interviews with major poets, essays, fiction and artwork.

Contributors to the magazine included: Alice Oswald, J. M. Coetzee, Ian Parks, Alan Jenkins, William Logan, Alison Brackenbury, Timothy Murphy, Mark Ford, Andrew Motion, David Mason, Dawn Potter, Tom Pow, and Grevel Lindop.

== New Walk Editions ==
From 2017 onwards, after the closure of the magazine, Waterman and Everett published New Walk Editions: a series of "high-end poetry pamphlets", including both new and established poets. There were four pamphlets a year, two in spring and two in autumn.
