= List of MPs for constituencies in the East Midlands region 2010–2015 =

This is a list of members of Parliament (MPs) elected to the House of Commons of the United Kingdom in the East Midlands region by constituencies for the Fifty-Fifth Parliament of the United Kingdom (2010 to 2015).

It includes both MPs elected at the 2010 general election, held on 6 May 2010, and those subsequently elected in by-elections.

== Current composition ==
Affiliation	Members
Conservative Party	32
Labour Party	14
Total	46

== MPs ==
MP	Constituency	Party	In constituency since
Alex Norris	Nottingham North	Labour Co-op	2017
Ed Argar	Charnwood	Conservative	2015
Jon Ashworth	Leicester South	Labour	2011 by-election
Victoria Atkins	Louth and Horncastle	Conservative	2015
Margaret Beckett	Derby South	Labour	1983
Ruth George	High Peak	Labour	2017
Nicholas Boles	Grantham and Stamford	Conservative	2010
Peter Bone	Wellingborough	Conservative	2005
Andrew Bridgen	North West Leicestershire	Conservative	2010
Kenneth Clarke	Rushcliffe	Conservative	1970
Vernon Coaker	Gedling	Labour	1997
Alberto Costa	South Leicestershire	Conservative	2015
Gloria De Piero	Ashfield	Labour	2010
Alan Duncan	Rutland and Melton	Conservative	1992
Michael Ellis	Northampton North	Conservative	2010
Lee Rowley	North East Derbyshire	Conservative	2017
Edward Garnier	Harborough	Conservative	1992
Lilian Greenwood	Nottingham South	Labour	2010
John Hayes	South Holland and The Deepings	Conservative	1997
Chris Heaton-Harris	Daventry	Conservative	2010
Philip Hollobone	Kettering	Conservative	2010
Robert Jenrick	Newark	Conservative	2014 by-election
Caroline Johnson	Sleaford and North Hykeham	Conservative	2016 by-election
Liz Kendall	Leicester West	Labour	2010
Pauline Latham	Mid Derbyshire	Conservative	2010
Andrea Leadsom	South Northamptonshire	Conservative	2010
Sir Edward Leigh	Gainsborough	Conservative	1983
Chris Leslie	Nottingham East	Labour Co-op	2010
Andrew Lewer	Northampton South	Conservative	2017
John Mann	Bassetlaw	Labour	2001
Karen Lee	Lincoln	Labour	2017
Patrick McLoughlin	Derbyshire Dales	Conservative	2010
Ben Bradley	Mansfield	Conservative	2017
Nigel Mills	Amber Valley	Conservative	2010
Nicky Morgan	Loughborough	Conservative	2010
Toby Perkins	Chesterfield	Labour	2010
Tom Pursglove	Corby	Conservative	2015
Dennis Skinner	Bolsover	Labour	1970
Chris Williamson	Derby North	Labour	2017
Anna Soubry	Broxtowe	Conservative	2010
Mark Spencer	Sherwood	Conservative	2010
Maggie Throup	Erewash	Conservative	2015
David Tredinnick	Bosworth	Conservative	1987
Keith Vaz	Leicester East	Labour	1987
Matt Warman	Boston and Skegness	Conservative	2015
Heather Wheeler	South Derbyshire	Conservative	2010

== By-elections ==
- 2011 Leicester South by-election
- 2012 Corby by-election
- 2014 Newark by-election

== See also ==
- 2010 United Kingdom general election
- List of MPs elected in the 2010 United Kingdom general election
- List of MPs for constituencies in England 2010–2015
- Category:UK MPs 2010–2015
