= Chris Heaton-Harris =

British politician (born 1967)

The Right Honourable Chris Heaton-Harris
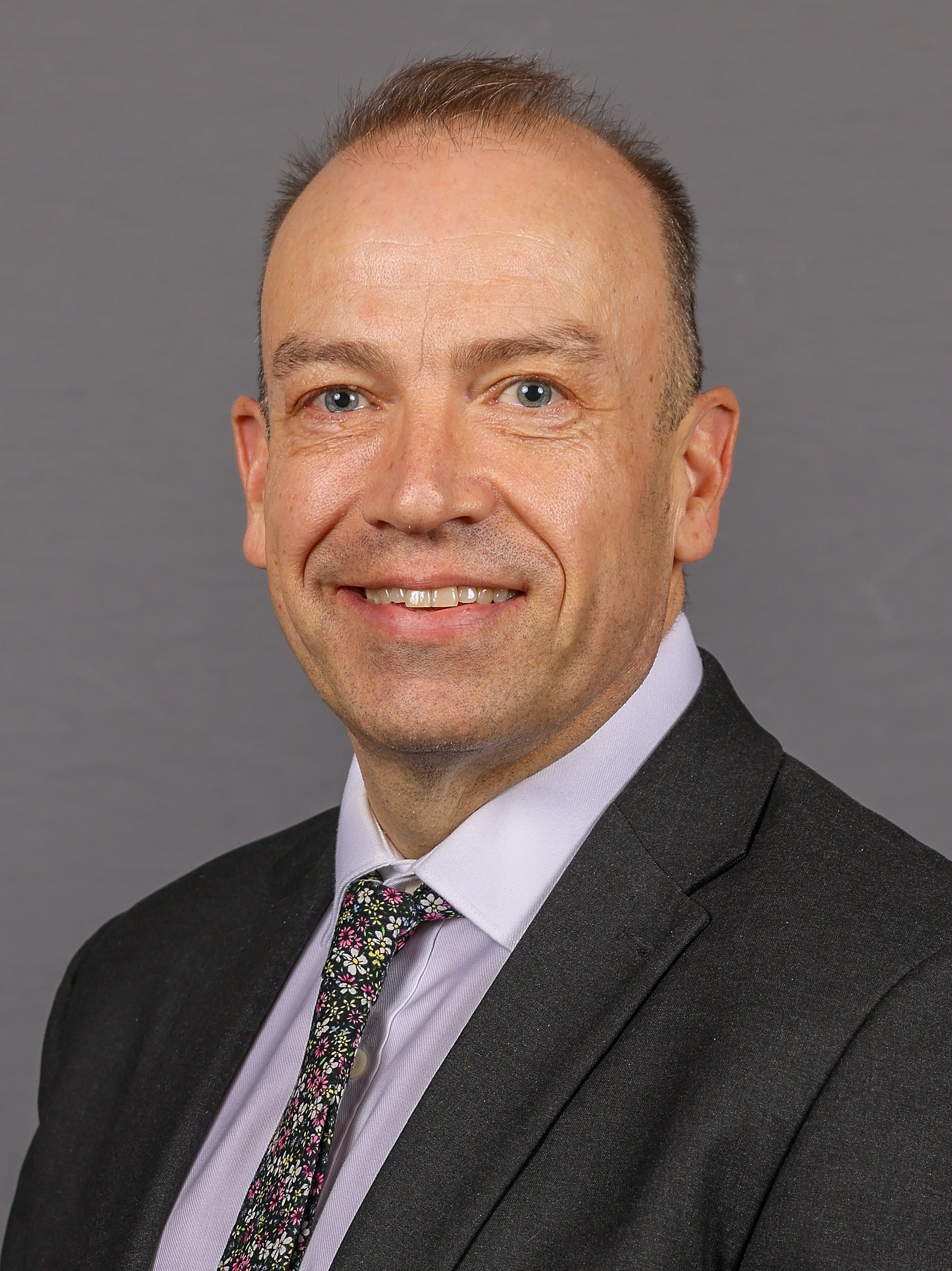
- Official portrait, 2022

Secretary of State for Northern Ireland
- In office 6 September 2022 – 5 July 2024
- Prime Minister: Liz Truss; Rishi Sunak
- Preceded by: Shailesh Vara
- Succeeded by: Hilary Benn

Government Chief Whip in the House of Commons Parliamentary Secretary to the Treasury
- In office 8 February 2022 – 6 September 2022
- Prime Minister: Boris Johnson
- Preceded by: Mark Spencer
- Succeeded by: Wendy Morton
Junior ministerial offices 2017–2022
Minister of State for Europe
In office 19 December 2021 – 8 February 2022
Prime Minister	Boris Johnson
Preceded by	Wendy Morton
Succeeded by	James Cleverly
Minister of State for Transport
In office 25 July 2019 – 19 December 2021
Prime Minister	Boris Johnson
Preceded by	Michael Ellis
Succeeded by	Wendy Morton
Parliamentary Under-Secretary of State for Exiting the European Union
In office 9 July 2018 – 3 April 2019
Prime Minister	Theresa May
Preceded by	Steve Baker
Succeeded by	James Cleverly
Comptroller of the Household
In office 9 January 2018 – 9 July 2018
Prime Minister	Theresa May
Preceded by	Chris Pincher
Succeeded by	Mark Spencer
Deputy Leader of the House of Commons
In office 9 January 2018 – 9 July 2018
Prime Minister	Theresa May
Preceded by	Michael Ellis
Succeeded by	Mark Spencer
Vice-Chamberlain of the Household
In office 15 June 2017 – 9 January 2018
Prime Minister	Theresa May
Preceded by	Julian Smith
Succeeded by	Mark Spencer

Member of Parliament for Daventry
- In office 6 May 2010 – 30 May 2024
- Preceded by: Tim Boswell
- Succeeded by: Stuart Andrew

Member of the European Parliament for East Midlands
- In office 1 May 1999 – 4 June 2009
- Preceded by: Position established
- Succeeded by: Emma McClarkin

Chair of the European Research Group
- In office 2010–2016
- Preceded by: David Heathcoat-Amory
- Succeeded by: Steve Baker

Personal details
- Born: Christopher Heaton-Harris; 28 November 1967 (age 58) Epsom, Surrey, England
- Party: Conservative
- Children: 2
- Education: Wolverhampton Polytechnic

Christopher Heaton-Harris (born 28 November 1967) is a British former politician who served in the Cabinet as Secretary of State for Northern Ireland from September 2022 to July 2024, and as Chief Whip and Parliamentary Secretary to the Treasury from February to September 2022. A member of the Conservative Party, he was the Member of Parliament (MP) for Daventry from 2010 to 2024.

Born in Epsom, Heaton-Harris attended Tiffin School. He went on to study at Wolverhampton Polytechnic, before working in his family business. He was elected to the European Parliament as MEP for the East Midlands in 1999, and was the Chief Whip of the Conservatives there from 2001 to 2004. He was reelected in the 2004 election before standing down in 2009. After two unsuccessful attempts to be elected to the House of Commons, Heaton-Harris was elected as MP for Daventry in the 2010 general election. He was reelected in both the 2015 and 2017 general election. On the backbenches, he was Chair of the European Research Group from 2010 to 2016.

Heaton-Harris joined the government frontbench in 2017 under Prime Minister Theresa May as Vice-Chamberlain of the Household, before serving as Comptroller of the Household and Deputy Leader of the House of Commons from January to July 2018. Under May, he later served as Parliamentary Under-Secretary of State for Exiting the European Union from 2018 to 2019. Under Prime Minister Boris Johnson, he served as Minister of State for Transport from 2019 to 2021 and as Minister of State for Europe from 2021 to 2022. In February 2022, he was appointed to the Cabinet as Chief Whip and Parliamentary Secretary to the Treasury, and was sworn in as a privy counsellor. After Liz Truss became prime minister, Heaton-Harris was appointed Secretary of State for Northern Ireland; an office he continued in under Prime Minister Rishi Sunak. After serving in parliament for 14 years, Heaton-Harris stood down at the 2024 general election.

== Early life and education ==
Born on 28 November 1967, Heaton-Harris attended the Tiffin School in Kingston upon Thames. He attended Wolverhampton Polytechnic, which in 1992 became the University of Wolverhampton.

Heaton-Harris worked for the family business at New Covent Garden Market, before taking over from his father running What4 Ltd for eleven years. At the 1997 general election he unsuccessfully contested the constituency of Leicester South. He again unsuccessfully contested the seat in the 2004 Leicester South by-election.

== European Parliament ==
Heaton-Harris was elected to the European Parliament in 1999 as MEP for the East Midlands, and was re-elected in 2004. He was the Chief Whip of the Conservatives in the European Parliament from 2001 to March 2004.

Heaton-Harris sat on the Internal Market Committee, responsible for "co-ordination at Community level of national legislation in the sphere of the internal market and of the customs union", as well as the Central America Delegation and the Bulgaria Delegation.

He was a founding member of the Campaign for Parliamentary Reform, a cross-national, cross-party group of MEPs that campaigns for reforms within the parliament. Its manifesto includes creating one seat for the parliament (in Brussels), cleaning up the system for MEPs' expenses, and improving debate within the parliament.

Heaton-Harris was responsible for bringing the case of Marta Andreasen, the European Commission's Chief Accountant, to public attention in August 2002 and has been involved in fighting fraud, mismanagement and waste within the European Commission and other European institutions.

From May 2006, he sought support within the European Union legislature for a letter to FIFA demanding that the Iranian national football team be thrown out of the 2006 World Cup because of then Iranian President Mahmoud Ahmadinejad's comments about the Holocaust being a lie.

Prior to standing down in 2009, Heaton-Harris was the President of the Sports Intergroup, a group of approximately 40 MEPs who have an interest in sport and sporting issues.

In 2012, Heaton-Harris described himself as a "fierce Eurosceptic".

== Parliamentary career ==
At the 1997 general election Heaton-Harris unsuccessfully contested the constituency of Leicester South, finishing second with 23.7% of the vote behind the incumbent Labour MP Jim Marshall He again unsuccessfully contested the seat in the 2004 Leicester South by-election, finishing third with 19.7% of the vote behind the Liberal Democrat Parmjit Singh Gill and Labour's Peter Soulsby.

Chris Heaton-Harris was a member of the Conservative A-List and was selected to succeed Tim Boswell as candidate for the safe Conservative constituency of Daventry in June 2006. He was elected as MP for Daventry at the 2010 general election with a majority of 19,188 and 56.5% of the vote.

On 18 May 2024, he announced that he would not seek re-election as an MP at the 2024 general election.

=== Backbencher ===
In March 2012, Heaton-Harris was reported as being one of the Conservative MPs to have spoken critically of Party Co-Chairman Sayeeda Warsi at a meeting of the 1922 Committee, following Warsi's handling of Roger Helmer MEP's defection to UKIP.

=== Ministerial career ===
At the 2015 general election, Heaton-Harris was re-elected with an increased vote share of 58.2% and an increased majority 21,059. At the snap 2017 general election he was again re-elected with an increased vote share of 63.7% and an increased majority of 21,734.

Heaton-Harris was appointed Vice-Chamberlain of the Household, a whips office sinecure, on 15 July 2017. He was promoted to Deputy Leader of the House of Commons and Comptroller of the Household on 9 January 2018.

Following the resignation of Boris Johnson as Foreign Secretary and the following resignations of several Conservative ministers on 9 July 2018, Heaton-Harris was appointed as one of three Parliamentary Under-Secretaries of State at the Department for Exiting the European Union. He resigned from this position to support Andrea Leadsom's second Conservative leadership bid, which she lost to Boris Johnson.

On 25 July 2019, he was appointed by Johnson as the Minister of State for Transport.

At the 2019 general election, Heaton-Harris was again re-elected with an increased vote share of 64.6% and an increased majority of 26,080.

He was appointed Minister of State for Europe on 19 December 2021 when ministerial responsibility for Europe was transferred out of the Cabinet Office and to the Foreign Office. In February 2022, he was appointed by Johnson as Chief Whip of the Conservative Party and was subsequently sworn into the Privy Council of the United Kingdom.

Following Liz Truss's appointment as prime minister in September 2022, he was promoted to Secretary of State for Northern Ireland. On 8 September he made his first visit to Northern Ireland. He was retained in position by Rishi Sunak when Sunak became prime minister on 25 October 2022. He was secretary of state during the negotiation of the 2023 Windsor Framework.

=== Hospitality ===
Heaton-Harris accepted tickets for himself and his family to attend four events at the London 2012 Olympics relating to swimming, diving, gymnastics, and the closing ceremony, as a gift from Coca-Cola. The value of the gifts (£11,750) was the highest amount received by any MP. He declared them in the Register of Members' Interests. Heaton-Harris was one of several MPs, including Labour's shadow whip Mark Tami, who received tickets worth £1,961 to the England v Germany game at the 2020 UEFA European Football Championship from Power Leisure Bookmakers.

=== Climate change ===
In November 2012, covert video footage of Heaton-Harris discussing the role of James Delingpole in the Corby by-election were published on the website of The Guardian. The recording, made by Greenpeace, appeared to show the MP's support for Delingpole's independent, anti-windfarm candidacy, at a time when Heaton-Harris was engaged by the Conservatives to run the unsuccessful campaign of their own candidate, Christine Emmett.

Heaton-Harris indicated that this was linked to a plan by core members of the Conservative Party to emasculate the Climate Change Act by making its commitments advisory rather than mandatory. After Heaton-Harris apologised for the impression he gave in the video, Home Secretary Theresa May said he was guilty only of silly bragging, while Labour's Michael Dugher MP urged Prime Minister David Cameron to show leadership and punish him. The Corby by-election was subsequently lost by the Conservatives with a swing to Labour of 12.8 per cent.

=== Letters to universities ===
In October 2017, Heaton-Harris, a Eurosceptic, wrote to the vice-chancellors of every university in the UK, requesting the names of academics lecturing on Brexit and copies of all course material, leading to claims of political interference in academic freedom, as well as censorship. The move was described as "McCarthyite" by Professor Kevin Featherstone, head of the European Institute at the London School of Economics, and "sinister" by Professor David Green, the vice-Chancellor of Worcester University who likened it to Newspeak and the Thought Police from George Orwell's Nineteen Eighty-Four. The Dean of Durham Law School, Thom Brooks, called it "dog whistle politics at its worst", while Lord Patten, Chancellor of Oxford University, called the letter an act of "idiotic and offensive Leninism". In addition, the letter attracted criticism from both pro-Remain and pro-Leave academics at Cambridge and London's Queen Mary universities, and a rebuke from Downing Street.

Responding the next day to the widespread criticism from both politicians and academics, universities minister Jo Johnson suggested that Heaton-Harris might have been researching a possible book on "the evolution of attitudes" to Europe, rather than acting in his role as a government minister, and "probably didn't appreciate the degree to which (the letter) would be misinterpreted", although there was no mention of any research for a possible book in the original letter. On 17 February 2019, Heaton-Harris said that there had never been any plans for a book.

=== European Research Group ===
Heaton-Harris chaired the European Research Group (ERG), a group of Eurosceptic MPs, from 2010 until November 2016. Subscriptions totalling £13,850 were claimed as a parliamentary expense. At the same time he sat on the wide-ranging powers of the European Scrutiny Committee, set up to assess the legal and/or political importance of draft EU legislation.

Documents from the House of Commons catering department released via Freedom of Information to openDemocracy, show Heaton-Harris hosted an ERG breakfast meeting in October 2017, despite taking over as a government whip in July 2016. Continuing to chair the group while he was a member of the government led to an accusation of violating the Ministerial Code, section 7.12 of which states: "Ministers should take care to ensure that they do not become associated with non-public organisations whose objectives may in any degree conflict with Government policy and thus give rise to a conflict of interest." However, a government spokesperson stated that they did not view it as a breach.

== Personal life ==
Heaton-Harris is married and has two children. He is a qualified football referee.

== Honours ==
He was sworn in as a member of Her Majesty's Most Honourable Privy Council on 16 February 2022 at Windsor Castle. This gave him the honorific prefix "The Right Honourable" for life.

Parliament of the United Kingdom
Preceded by Tim Boswell	Member of Parliament for Daventry; 2010–2024	Succeeded by Stuart Andrew
Other offices
Preceded by David Heathcoat-Amory	Chairman of the European Research Group; 2010–2016	Succeeded by Steve Baker
Political offices
Preceded by Shailesh Vara	Secretary of State for Northern Ireland; 2022–2024	Succeeded by Hilary Benn
