= Leicester South by-election =

Leicester South by-election may refer to:

- 2004 Leicester South by-election
- 2011 Leicester South by-election
