= Ismail Patel =

British optician

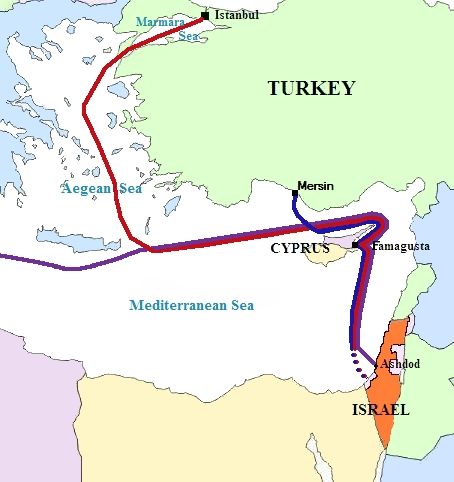
Gaza flotilla route

Ismail Patel (born 1962) is a British optician, and founder of Friends of Al-Aqsa, an NGO based in Leicester.

He is an advisory board member of the Conflicts Forum, director of IslamExpo, and a member of the Special Advisory Board of Clear Conscience.

He writes commentary for The Guardian, The Independent, Aljazeera English and Arabian Business.

== Friends of al-Aqsa ==
Patel is the founder and chair of the NGO Friends of al-Aqsa, which campaigns on Palestine-related issues. It advocates for Boycott, Divestment and Sanctions against Israel.

In 2010, Friends of al-Aqsa sponsored a trip to Israel for British parliamentarians, which included meetings with senior Hamas officials.

Friends of al-Aqsa raised £10,000 for Jeremy Corbyn at a fundraising dinner in 2015.

In 2023, while the Hamas October 7 attacks were happening in Israel, Friends of al-Aqsa organised a march through London, which took place a week later, as well as a demonstratio at the Israeli embassy 48 hours after the attacks. In 2026, a conference fringe event organised by Friends of al-Aqsa was banned from the Labour Party Conference in September 2026.

== Alleged Hamas connections ==
In 2009, during the Gaza War (2008–2009), Patel said: “Hamas is no terrorist organisation. The reason they hate Hamas is because they refuse to be subjugated, occupied by the Israeli state. We salute Hamas for standing up to Israel.”

According to the Daily Telegraph, Patel "allegedly met Ismail Haniyeh, Hamas’s former political leader, in Gaza in 2012 and was pictured with him."

In 2021, Patel praised the killer of Eli Kay, a tour guide in Jerusalem, as a “martyr”.

== Gaza flotilla ==
Patel joined the 2010 Gaza Freedom Flotilla and was on board the MV Mavi Marmara.

He was held by Israel for just under 48 hours and then deported to Turkey. He flew back to London Heathrow, and gave a press conference with Alex Harrison and Daniel Machover. Patel states he witnessed at extremely close range the shooting of two of the ten killed by the Israel Defense Forces in their raid at sea on the MV Mavi Marmara.

== Personal life ==
He is the brother of Shockat Adam, the pro-Gaza independent MP for Leicester South since the 2024 United Kingdom general election.
