= 2011 Leicester South by-election =

2011 UK parliament by-election

- 5 May 2011
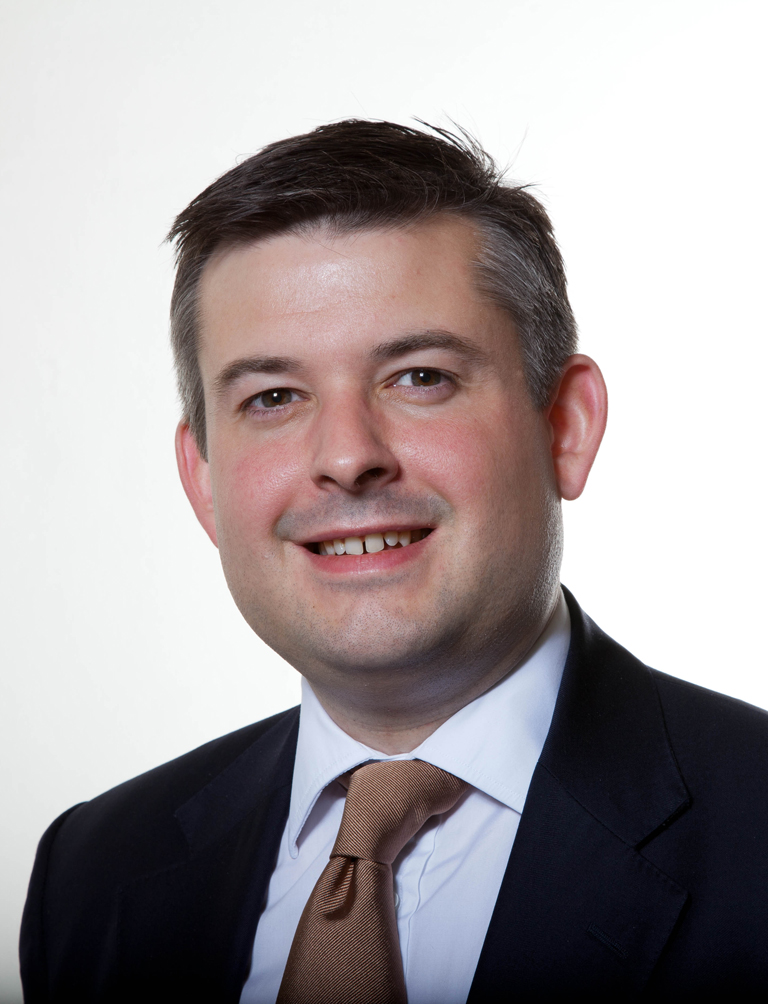

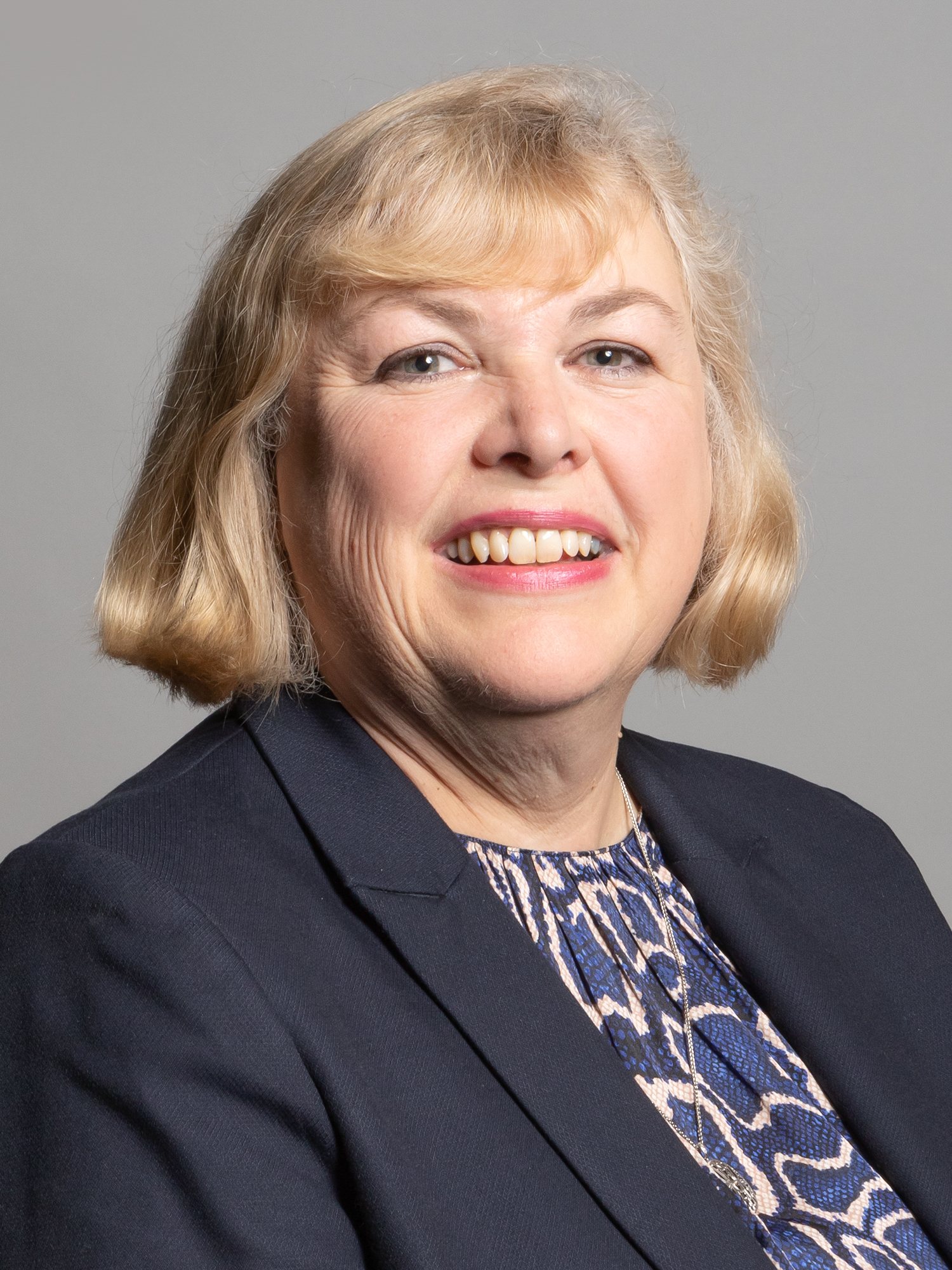
	First party	Second party	Third party
		Lib
Candidate	Jonathan Ashworth	Zuffar Haq	Jane Hunt
Party	Labour	Liberal Democrats	Conservative
Popular vote	19,771	7,693	5,169
Percentage	57.8%	22.5%	15.1%
Swing	▲12.2 pp	▼4.4 pp	▼6.3 pp
MP before election
Peter Soulsby
Labour
Subsequent MP
Jonathan Ashworth
Labour

A by-election for the United Kingdom parliamentary constituency of Leicester South was held on 5 May 2011, prompted by the resignation of incumbent Labour Party Member of Parliament (MP) Sir Peter Soulsby, who stood down to contest the election for Mayor of Leicester. It was won by Labour candidate Jonathan Ashworth with an increased majority for the party.

== Background ==
Leicester South was very narrowly won by the Conservatives in 1983, and regained by Labour in the 1987 general election. Following the death of Labour MP Jim Marshall, a by-election was held in July 2004 at which the Liberal Democrats gained the seat. Peter Soulsby regained the seat for Labour at the general election in May 2005; he increased his majority at the 2010 general election.

As a former Leader of Leicester City Council, Soulsby put his name forward for selection as the Labour Party candidate for the directly elected Mayoralty of Leicester after the city council voted to adopt a new leadership structure. In standing for selection he indicated that he would vacate his Parliamentary seat if selected. When Soulsby won the selection he immediately announced that he would indeed resign his seat. On 1 April 2011 the Chancellor of the Exchequer appointed Soulsby as Crown Steward and Bailiff of the Manor of Northstead, formally vacating the seat. Labour chief whip Rosie Winterton moved the motion on 5 April to issue a writ for a new election.

=== Voting eligibility ===
All registered Parliamentary electors (i.e. British, Irish and Commonwealth citizens living in the UK and British citizens living overseas) who were aged 18 or over on 5 May 2011 were entitled to vote in the by-election. The deadline for voters to register to vote in the by-election was midnight on Thursday 14 April 2011. However, those who qualified as an anonymous elector had until midnight on Tuesday 26 April 2011 to register to vote.

== Candidates ==
Leicester City Council confirmed the list of candidates on 14 April 2011. With only five candidates, the poll had the shortest by-election ballot paper since the 2005 Cheadle by-election.

There was wide interest in the Labour candidate selection. One local councillor, Rory Palmer, entered the contest but—having accepted the offer of becoming Soulsby's deputy—subsequently withdrew. The official shortlist of five candidates was confirmed on 18 March and included three Leicester city councillors, Patrick Kitterick (who was also Chair of Leicester South Constituency Labour Party), Mian Mayat and Neil Clayton, along with Jonathan Ashworth, a former advisor to Gordon Brown and the then Head of Party Relations, and Josephine Channer, a councillor in the London Borough of Barking and Dagenham. On 19 March local Labour Party members selected Jon Ashworth, who won 106 votes out of 153 cast on the first ballot.

Former Liberal Democrat MP for the constituency Parmjit Singh Gill was initially selected as that party's candidate on 18 March. On 23 March he withdrew from the candidacy, saying that he wanted to concentrate on his position as a Leicester City Councillor; he was immediately replaced as candidate by Zuffar Haq.

On 15 March 2011, UKIP selected Abhijit Pandya, a former Leicester South resident and alumnus of the University of Leicester, as its candidate.

On 26 March the Conservatives selected Jane Hunt as their candidate. She had contested the Leicester East constituency at the 2010 General Election.

== Results ==
Labour retained the seat with an increased majority. The Official Monster Raving Loony Party received its best ever result in an election.

Election	Political result	Candidate	Party	Votes	%	±%
By-election, 2011; Electorate: 75,916; Turnout: 34,180 (45.0%) −3.0	Labour hold Majority: 12,078 (35.3%) +16.6; Swing: +8.4% from Lib Dem to Lab	Jonathan Ashworth	Labour	19,771	57.8	+12.2
By-election, 2011; Electorate: 75,916; Turnout: 34,180 (45.0%) −3.0	Labour hold Majority: 12,078 (35.3%) +16.6; Swing: +8.4% from Lib Dem to Lab	Zuffar Haq	Liberal Democrats	7,693	22.5	-4.4
By-election, 2011; Electorate: 75,916; Turnout: 34,180 (45.0%) −3.0	Labour hold Majority: 12,078 (35.3%) +16.6; Swing: +8.4% from Lib Dem to Lab	Jane Hunt	Conservative	5,169	15.1	-6.3
By-election, 2011; Electorate: 75,916; Turnout: 34,180 (45.0%) −3.0	Labour hold Majority: 12,078 (35.3%) +16.6; Swing: +8.4% from Lib Dem to Lab	Abhijit Pandya	UKIP	994	2.9	+1.4
By-election, 2011; Electorate: 75,916; Turnout: 34,180 (45.0%) −3.0	Labour hold Majority: 12,078 (35.3%) +16.6; Swing: +8.4% from Lib Dem to Lab	Howling Laud Hope	Monster Raving Loony	553	1.6	New
General Election 2010; Electorate: 75,916; Turnout: 47,124 (61.1%) +3.4	Labour hold Majority: 8,808 (18.7%); Swing: +5.0% from Lib Dem to Lab	Peter Soulsby	Labour	21,479	45.6	+6.2
General Election 2010; Electorate: 75,916; Turnout: 47,124 (61.1%) +3.4	Labour hold Majority: 8,808 (18.7%); Swing: +5.0% from Lib Dem to Lab	Parmjit Singh Gill	Liberal Democrats	12,671	26.9	-3.7
General Election 2010; Electorate: 75,916; Turnout: 47,124 (61.1%) +3.4	Labour hold Majority: 8,808 (18.7%); Swing: +5.0% from Lib Dem to Lab	Ross Grant	Conservative	10,066	21.4	+3.6
General Election 2010; Electorate: 75,916; Turnout: 47,124 (61.1%) +3.4	Labour hold Majority: 8,808 (18.7%); Swing: +5.0% from Lib Dem to Lab	Adrian Waudby	BNP	1,418	3.0	New
General Election 2010; Electorate: 75,916; Turnout: 47,124 (61.1%) +3.4	Labour hold Majority: 8,808 (18.7%); Swing: +5.0% from Lib Dem to Lab	Dave Dixey	Green	770	1.6	New
General Election 2010; Electorate: 75,916; Turnout: 47,124 (61.1%) +3.4	Labour hold Majority: 8,808 (18.7%); Swing: +5.0% from Lib Dem to Lab	Christopher Lucas	UKIP	720	1.5	New

== See also ==
- 2004 Leicester South by-election
- List of United Kingdom by-elections
- Opinion polling for the 2015 United Kingdom general election
