= Ronald Wilberforce Allen =

English lawyer and Liberal politician (1889–1936)

Member of Parliament for Leicester South
- In office 6 December 1923 – 9 October 1924
- Preceded by: William George Waterhouse Reynolds
- Succeeded by: Charles Waterhouse

Personal details
- Born: 24 November 1889 Stamford Hill, London, England
- Died: 10 August 1936 (aged 46) Fife, Scotland
- Party: Liberal

Sir Ronald Wilberforce Allen (24 November 1889 – 10 August 1936) was an English lawyer and Liberal politician.

== Family and education ==
Allen was born in Stamford Hill in north London, the son of the Reverend William Allen, a Wesleyan minister. He was educated at Scarborough College and King's College, London where obtained his BA degree in 1910. He never married. In religion he followed his father's path and became a prominent Methodist layman.

== Career ==
Allen went in for the law and was admitted as a solicitor in 1913 later rising to become senior partner in the firm of Wilberforce Allen & Bryant, with offices in the Strand, Cheapside and Ludgate Hill. During the First World War he served as a Sub-Lieutenant in the Royal Naval Volunteer Reserve. He also gave lectures on literary and economic subjects and was an occasional contributor to various periodicals. He was later a member of the Board of the Abbey Road Building Society.

== Politics ==
=== Beginnings ===
Allen was elected as a member of St Albans City Council in 1920 and served until 1923. In 1922 he was adopted as prospective Liberal candidate for St Albans but never fought the seat.

=== Leicester East by-election ===
Allen did not contest St Albans because he was selected instead to stand as Liberal candidate at a by-election in Leicester East in March 1922. The election was caused by the appointment of the Coalition Liberal Member of Parliament Sir Gordon Hewart as Lord Chief Justice of England. As result Hewart took a seat in the House of Lords. Allen stood as an Independent Asquithian Liberal in a three-cornered contest with the Labour Party and a Coalition Liberal. The anti-socialist vote thus split, Labour's Alderman George Banton was elected with over 50% of the poll.

=== The General Election of 1922 ===
The 1922 general election followed a few months later in November and this time Allen was chosen to fight in Leicester South. In a straight fight with the Conservative Party he narrowly missed being elected, the majority of his opponent, William Reynolds, being only 109 (or 0.4% of the vote).

=== The General Elections of 1923 and 1924 ===
However, Allen was successful at South Leicester in the 1923 general election. Again facing Reynolds in a straight fight he achieved a majority of 4,018 votes. He only served as the MP for a year though, as in 1924 general election the Labour Party fielded a candidate. This had the effect of splitting the anti-Tory vote and Allen fell to the bottom of the poll, the Tory Charles Waterhouse re-gaining the seat for his party.

=== 1929-1935 ===
Allen tried to re-enter the House of Commons at the 1929 general election but he had switched seats and now contested the Banbury or North Division of Oxfordshire. In a three-cornered contest he put in a strong showing, cutting the Unionist majority from 6,228 to 2,644 with Labour in third place but he could not remove the sitting Tory MP A J Edmondson.

Allen did not stand as a candidate at the 1931 general election but made one last attempt to re-enter Parliament in 1935. He was selected to fight the seat of Penryn and Falmouth in Cornwall which had been Liberal in 1923 and 1929 but which had been gained for the Conservatives by Maurice Petherick at the 1931 election. In a three-cornered contest the seat was retained by Petherick (39% of the vote) with the Labour candidate and historian A.L.Rowse coming second (32%) and Allen in third (28%).

== Other appointments and honours ==
Allen was a member of the Delegacy of King's College London the governing body of the college. The Delegacy was a committee of the Senate of the University of London, which had to ratify all major decisions. He also served Treasurer of the Temperance Council of Christian Churches and was President of the London Division of the National Commercial Temperance League He was for a time a member of the board of governors of his old school, Scarborough College. He was knighted in 1932.

== Death ==
Allen died on 10 August 1936 while on a seaside holiday in Fife shortly after completing a swim. He was 46 years old.

== Publication ==
- Methodism and Modern World Problems - Methuen & Co., London 1926

Parliament of the United Kingdom
Preceded by William George Waterhouse Reynolds	Member of Parliament for Leicester South; 1923–1924	Succeeded by Charles Waterhouse
