= Thomas Blane =

British politician

Member of Parliament for Leicester South
- In office 1918–1922
- Preceded by: Constituency established
- Succeeded by: William George Waterhouse Reynolds
- Majority: 13,035 (54.4%)

Personal details
- Born: c. 1881
- Died: August 19, 1940
- Party: Coalition Conservative

Thomas Andrew Blane (1881 – 19 August 1940) was a British businessman and Coalition Conservative MP for Leicester South.

He won the seat in 1918, but stood down in 1922.

He also stood for the London County Council in Bethnal Green North East, for the Municipal Reform Party. He died in Adelaide, Australia.

== Sources ==
- F W S Craig, British Parliamentary Election Results, 1918–1949; Political Reference Publications, Glasgow, 1949
- London Municipal Notes, 1913
- Whitaker's Almanack, 1919 to 1922 editions

Parliament of the United Kingdom
Preceded by Constituency established	Leicester South; 1918 – 1922	Succeeded by William George Waterhouse Reynolds
