= Shockat Adam =

British politician

Shockat Adam MP
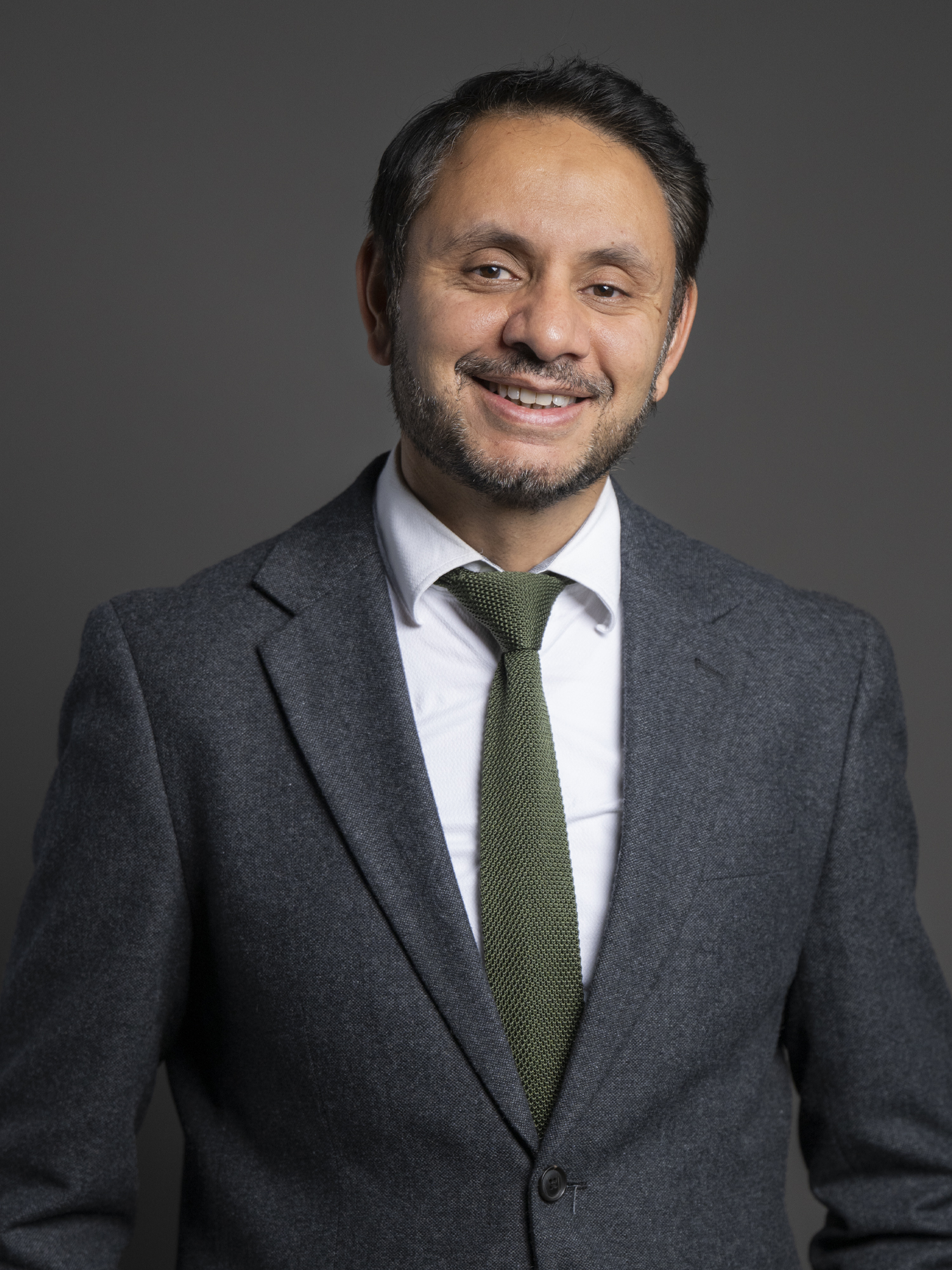
- Official portrait, 2024

Member of Parliament for Leicester South
- Incumbent
- Assumed office 4 July 2024
- Preceded by: Jonathan Ashworth
- Majority: 979 (2.3%)

Personal details
- Born: Shockat Hussain Adam Patel Malawi
- Party: Independent
- Other political affiliations: Independent Alliance (co-founder, 2024–); Your Party (2025–)
- Education: University of Manchester Institute of Science and Technology
- Website: shockatadam.org

Shockat Hussain Adam Patel is a British businessman, optometrist, and independent politician who has served as the Member of Parliament for Leicester South since 2024. In September 2024 he joined in founding the Independent Alliance.

== Early life and career ==
Adam was born in Malawi, into a Gujarati family and grew up in Leicester, where he attended sixth-form college. He studied optometry at the University of Manchester Institute of Science and Technology. He is a director of Sask Optics which is owned by him, his wife and his brother Ismail Patel.

Adam was the former Leicester chair of Muslim Engagement and Development, and spoke out against the 2022 Leicester unrest between Hindu and Muslim communities in the city.

Prior to his candidacy, Adam had never been a member of a political party nor had public social media. In the 2019 general election he had supported Labour Party candidate Claudia Webbe's campaign in Leicester East. Adam has previously hosted hustings, and aided people in contacting their MP.

== Parliamentary career ==
Adam was elected in the 2024 general election as an independent, beating Labour candidate and Shadow Paymaster General Jonathan Ashworth in a result that was described as an upset. Backlash against Labour's position on the Gaza war was a factor in Adam's victory, with Adam saying "this is for Gaza" while holding a Palestinian keffiyeh aloft when the results were announced. In an interview with The Observer, Adam said his victory was not sectarian, and highlighted his concerns and campaigning regarding the housing crisis and the state of the National Health Service.

On 19 July 2024, the Foreign Secretary, David Lammy, announced in parliament that the United Kingdom would resume funding to the UN Relief Agency for Palestinian Refugees (UNRWA). In a statement, Adam supported the move and described it as a result of pro-Palestinian protesters from all backgrounds. Adam apologised for not being present in parliament due to death threats he had received. He thanked Leicestershire and Cambridgeshire police for their assistance, and stated that he would not be deterred from his work.

Adam sponsored the Independent-Green "Amendment B" to abolish the two child benefit cap, and voted in support of the Scottish National Party's "Amendment D" to abolish the cap. Shortly after the vote Shockat Adam, Jeremy Corbyn, Adnan Hussain, Ayoub Khan, and Iqbal Mohamed produced a joint letter decrying the two major parties and stating the need for a caring alternative. Adam and Corbyn had been in discussions with Khan, Hussain, and Mohamed regarding how to impact policy, with Adam stating that the five were "looking at options that would give us more access to the levers of power".

On 2 September 2024, Adam was a founding member of the Independent Alliance parliamentary group. As of September 2025 the group has six members.

In October 2024, Adam introduced a private members' bill for the UK to recognise the State of Palestine. The bill was sponsored by the four other members of the Independent Alliance, as well as Siân Berry, Stephen Gethins, Brendan O'Hara, Liz Saville Roberts, Kim Johnson, and Ian Byrne. The United Kingdom later recognised Palestine on 21 September 2025.

== Personal life ==
He is the brother of Ismail Patel, the founder of the Friends of Al-Aqsa NGO based in Leicester.

Parliament of the United Kingdom
Preceded by Jonathan Ashworth	Member of Parliament for Leicester South; 2024–present	Incumbent
