= Jonathan Ashworth =

British politician

The Right Honourable Jonathan Ashworth CBE
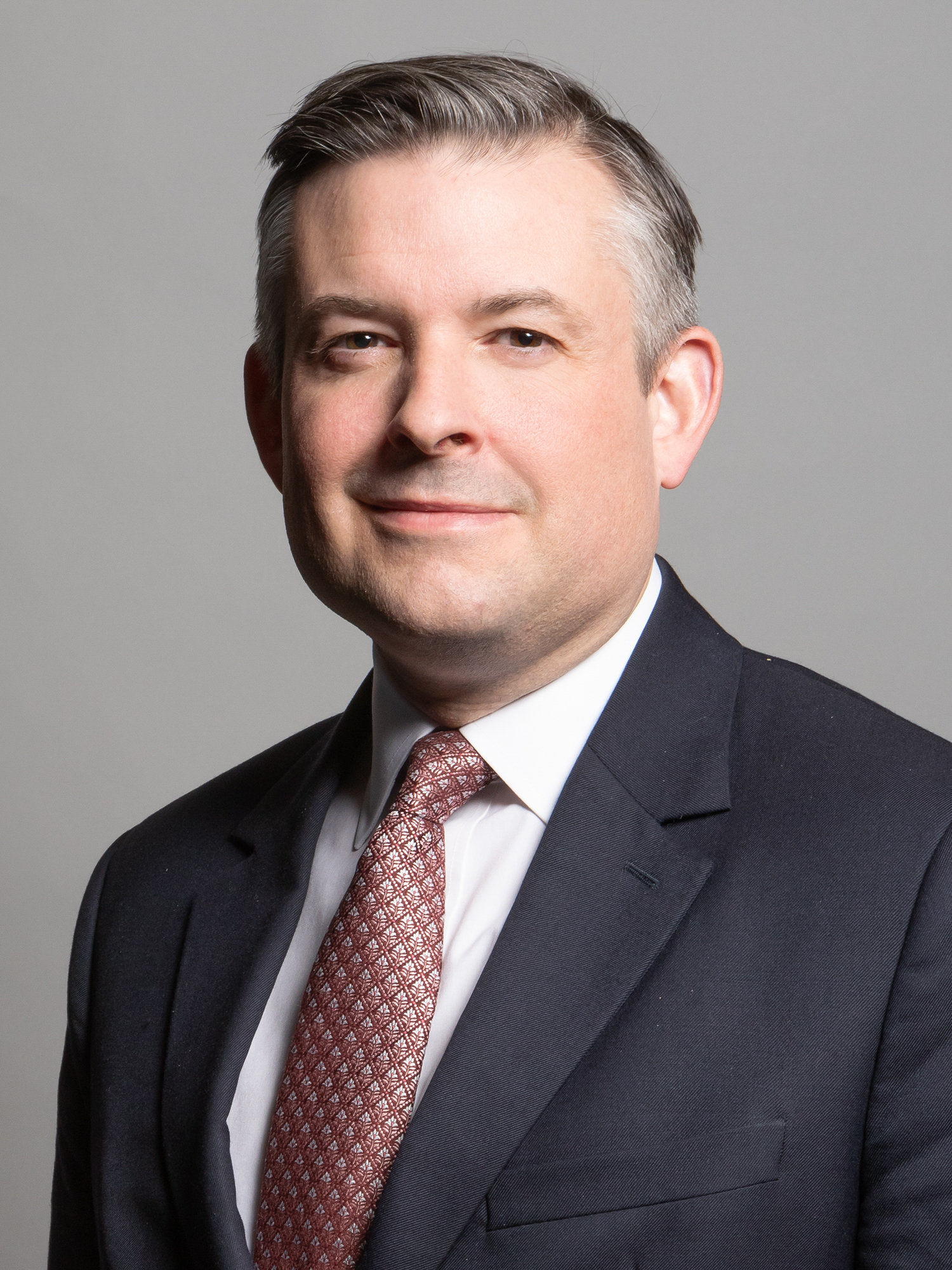
- Official portrait, 2020

Member of Parliament for Leicester South
- In office 5 May 2011 – 30 May 2024
- Preceded by: Peter Soulsby
- Succeeded by: Shockat Adam

Shadow Cabinet
- 2023–2024: Paymaster General
- 2021–2023: Work and Pensions
- 2016–2021: Health and Social Care

Shadow Minister
- 2015–2016: Without Portfolio
- 2013–2015: Cabinet Office

Personal details
- Born: Jonathan Michael Graham Ashworth; 14 October 1978 (age 48) Salford, Greater Manchester, England
- Party: Labour Co-op
- Spouse: Emilie Oldknow (m. 2010; div. 2024)
- Children: 2
- Education: Philips High School; Bury College
- Alma mater: St Aidan's College, Durham (BA)

Jonathan Michael Graham Ashworth CBE (born 14 October 1978) is a British former Labour and Co-op politician who was the Member of Parliament (MP) for Leicester South from 2011 to 2024. He had served as Shadow Paymaster General from September 2023. Having lost his seat at the 2024 general election, he was appointed chief executive of the Labour Together thinktank.

Prior to his election to Parliament, Ashworth worked as an adviser to Gordon Brown and head of party relations for Ed Miliband. He was first elected at a by-election in 2011, following the resignation of his predecessor Peter Soulsby. In October 2016, Ashworth was appointed Shadow Health Secretary by party leader Jeremy Corbyn, shadowing Jeremy Hunt and later Matt Hancock alongside the Shadow Minister for Social Care Barbara Keeley. In April 2020, Ashworth was reappointed to the position by new leader Keir Starmer, gaining the additional shadow portfolio of social care in England; he was succeeded in the role by Wes Streeting in 2021. Ashworth was Shadow Secretary of State for Work and Pensions from 2021 to September 2023, when he was appointed as the Shadow Paymaster General.

== Early life and education ==
Jonathan Ashworth was born on 14 October 1978 in Salford, was brought up in north Manchester and educated at Philips High School in Whitefield and Bury College. He read politics and philosophy at the University of Durham. In 2000 he served as National Secretary of Labour Students.

== Political career ==
=== Labour Party officer (2001–2004) ===
Ashworth began working for the Labour Party as a Political Research Officer in 2001, and was the Economics and Welfare Policy Officer from 2002 to 2004. In 2003, he was seconded to the Scottish Labour Party to work on the Scottish Parliament election campaign, where he worked closely with then-Chancellor of the Exchequer, Gordon Brown.

=== Special adviser (2004–2011) ===
From 2004, he was appointed as Special Adviser to Chief Secretaries to the Treasury Paul Boateng, Des Browne and Stephen Timms, but in practice he worked for Chancellor of the Exchequer Gordon Brown. His main job was liaising with the Labour movement and an Evening Standard profile said "his contact book was "stuffed with constituency officers and union organisers"; there was newspaper speculation that he would be Political Secretary at 10 Downing Street in a potential future Brown government.

When Gordon Brown became Prime Minister in June 2007, Ashworth was appointed deputy Political Secretary with the role of linking the Government to the trade unions. There was speculation later that year that Ashworth might be selected to replace John Prescott as the official Labour candidate for Kingston upon Hull East, although it came to nothing. Ashworth spent most of the Crewe and Nantwich by-election campaign in the constituency.

After the Labour Party were defeated at the 2010 general election, Ashworth became Political Secretary to the acting party leader Harriet Harman. He did not publicly support any candidate in the subsequent leadership election because of his role working for Harriet Harman but he was described as a "key member" of Ed Miliband's team on the day after Miliband won the Labour leadership election. When Miliband was elected as Leader of the Labour Party, he asked Ashworth to join his office as Head of Party Relations.

Before the 2010 general election, Ashworth was identified as someone for whom the Labour Party leadership wished to find a seat. He was linked with a possible candidature in Mansfield should the sitting Member of Parliament (MP) Alan Meale decide to stand down, but Meale decided to seek re-election despite widespread speculation he was to retire from Parliament. Ashworth was then identified as a potential candidate for Nottingham East when the sitting MP John Heppell retired, but the selection went to former MP Chris Leslie when the Labour National Executive Committee chose to impose Leslie at the last minute.

== Parliamentary career ==
Ashworth sought selection in Leicester South in 2011 when the sitting MP Peter Soulsby decided to resign to seek election as Mayor of Leicester. He was endorsed by the Co-operative Party and, once elected, became a Co-operative Party MP. Ashworth was selected as the Labour's Party's candidate. At the 2011 Leicester South by-election, Ashworth was elected as MP for the seat with 57.8% of the vote and a majority of 12,078.

Ashworth served as an Opposition Whip from October 2011 to October 2013 and Shadow Minister of State for the Cabinet Office from October 2013 to September 2015.

Following the row over alleged undue influence of trade unions in the Labour Party in the Falkirk parliamentary selection in 2013, Ashworth penned a piece for The Daily Telegraph claiming that it is ordinary people – not the unions – who choose Labour MPs.

On 11 July 2013, Ashworth replaced Tom Watson as Deputy Chairman of the National Executive Committee.

Ashworth was re-elected at the 2015 general election with an increased vote share of 59.8% and an increased majority of 17,845. After the election, Ashworth nominated Yvette Cooper to be Leader of the Labour Party following the resignation of Ed Miliband. He nominated Tom Watson as Deputy Leader.

Following his election as Labour Party leader, Jeremy Corbyn appointed Ashworth to the Shadow Cabinet role of Shadow Minister without Portfolio. In December 2015, Ashworth voted against the resolution to authorise RAF bombing of ISIL in Syria.

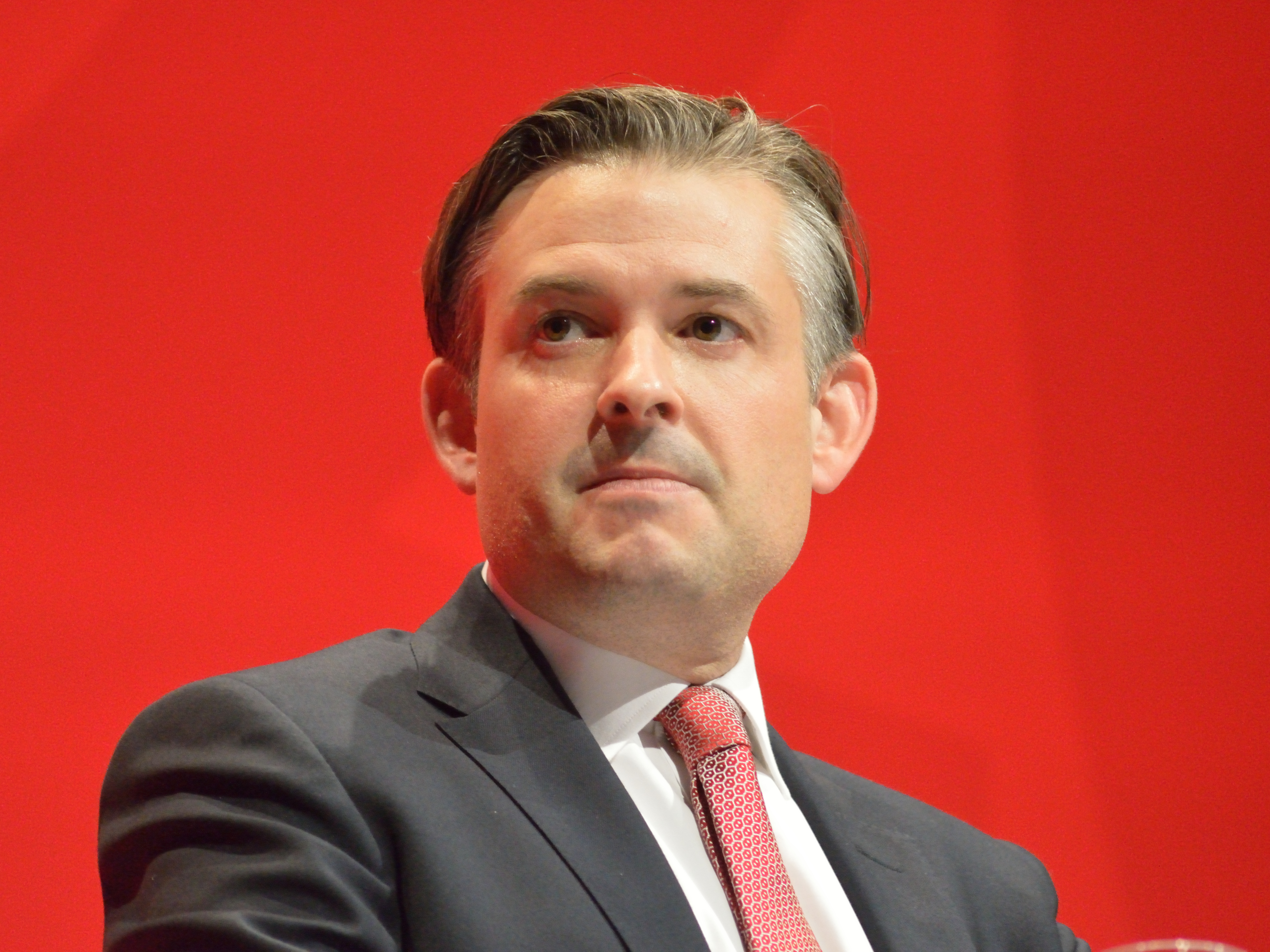
Ashworth at Labour Party Conference 2016

Ashworth was appointed Shadow Secretary of State for Health in October 2016. Following the 2017 general election, he went on record to say a Labour government would not repeal the controversial Health and Social Care Act 2012 despite Labour's manifesto commitment to do so.

Ashworth was again re-elected at the 2017 general election with an increased vote share of 73.6% and an increased majority of 26,261.

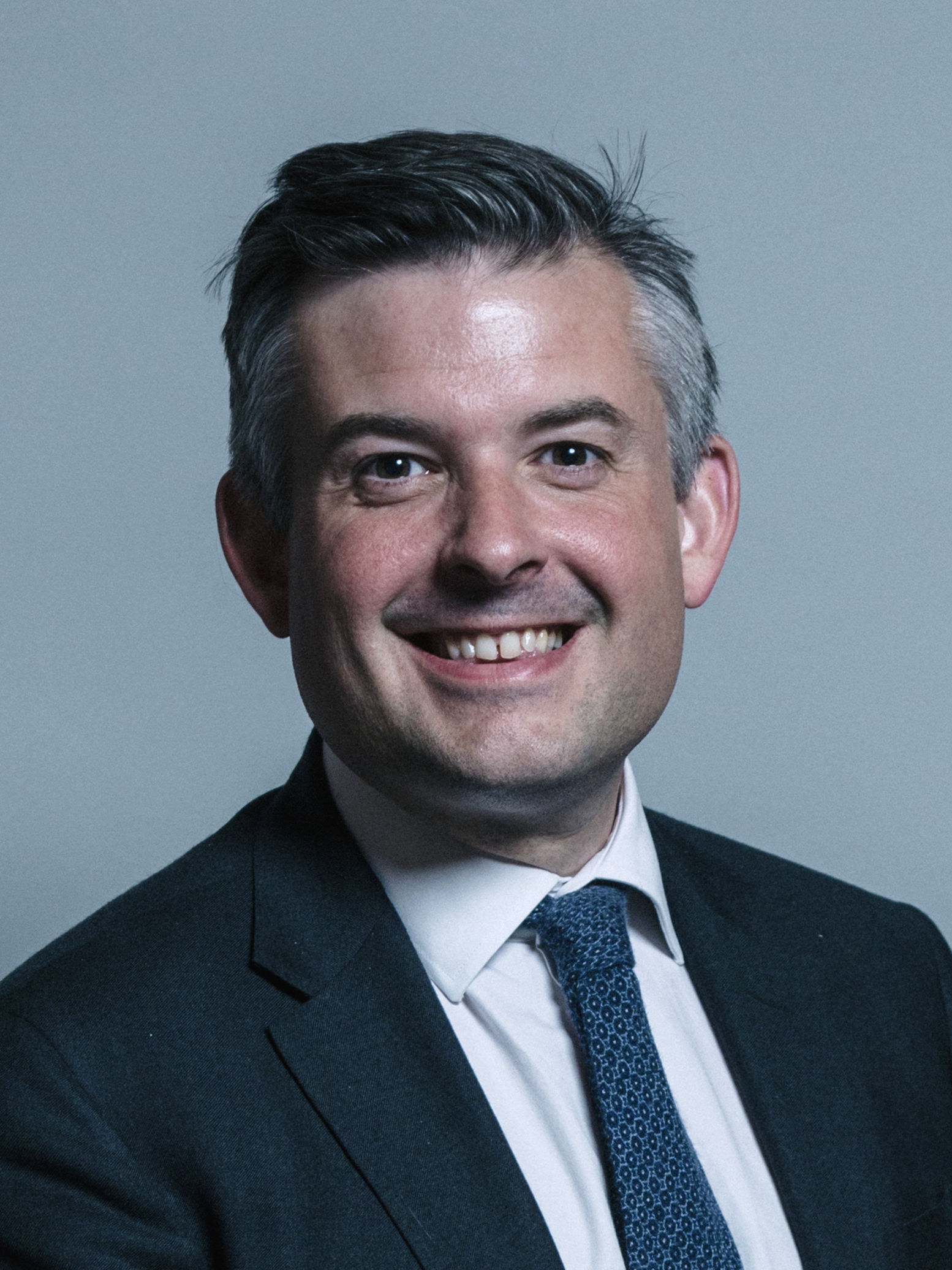
Ashworth in 2017

In December 2019, it was reported 4,668 patient deaths during the year were linked to safety incidents at hospital, mental health and ambulance trusts. Ashworth held "years of Tory cutbacks" responsible for understaffing and for increasing pressures, which he said put patients at risk.

On 10 December 2019, it emerged that Ashworth had told a friend that he did not believe Labour would win the 2019 general election due to be held two days later. He said that this was largely due to the unpopularity of Jeremy Corbyn and voters outside the cities blaming Labour for not delivering Brexit. His friend, who was a Conservative activist, leaked a recording of the conversation to right-wing website Guido Fawkes. Ashworth later claimed that he was joking and just "joshing around". He was re-elected at the 2019 general election with a decreased vote share of 67% and a decreased majority of 22,675. He was appointed to the Privy Council on 10 March 2021, and sworn on 26 May 2021.

In the November 2021 Shadow Cabinet reshuffle, Ashworth became Shadow Secretary of State for Work and Pensions. He remained in the position until the 2023 British shadow cabinet reshuffle, which saw him appointed to the position of Shadow Paymaster General.

On 4 July 2024, Ashworth lost his seat to pro-Palestine independent candidate Shockat Adam. He then became chief executive of the think tank Labour Together.

== Post-parliamentary career ==
On 9 July 2024, Ashworth was appointed chief executive of the Labour Together think tank. In January 2025, The Times reported that Labour Together had made redundancies, with up to 15% of staff leaving since the previous summer. One of these sources stated that Labour Together lacked "much of a purpose or sense of direction anymore", with few appearances from Ashworth and its director of policy Matthew Upton making decisions instead. One Labour Together member said that the group had "moved away from being a think tank that speaks publicly about policy", instead turning to "influencing government policy through private conversations with ministers and special advisers". The Times highlighted that the think tank was "losing staff and donors" and was "faltering under the leadership" of Ashworth, with MPs reporting receiving an increasing number of job applications from staff at Labour Together and funders turning their attention to other think tanks aligned with the Starmer leadership.

Under Ashworth's leadership, Labour Together have faced criticism over their "Farage-flavoured approach" to migration policy, and encouraging the Labour government to "[play] with fire" by leaning "into the anti-migrant policies and rhetoric employed by the populist far-right across Europe" by charity Asylum Matters. The LabourList article went on to say that Labour Together was proposing directions that lead to 'the road to a ruinous breakdown of community cohesion and the house of cards that is the progressive electoral coalition that brought Labour to power in the first place.' Ashworth announced in April 2025 that he would be stepping down from the role of CEO at Labour Together in July, after one year in the role, focusing on writing a book and launching a new podcast.

In July 2024, Ashworth was one of five politicians to cover for James O'Brien's radio show on LBC, as part of the station's "Guest Week".

In August 2024, Ashworth led a team of senior Labour figures to the 2024 Democratic National Convention in Chicago, Illinois, where he advised the Harris campaign on electoral strategy for the 2024 US Presidential Election.

== Personal life ==
In 2008, Ashworth became engaged to Emilie Oldknow, who later was a failed Labour candidate for Sherwood at the 2010 general election. Gordon Brown, former Prime Minister and his wife Sarah attended the couple's wedding on 3 July 2010, at St Michael's Church, Holbrook in Derbyshire. The Ashworths have two daughters.

Ashworth and Oldknow separated in 2022 and divorced in 2024. It was reported in February 2025 that Ashworth was in a relationship with Labour MP Stephanie Peacock.

As shadow health secretary, Ashworth advocated legislation to prevent alcoholism, inspired by his own experience of his father who was an alcoholic.

On 1 January 2026 Ashworth suffered an ischaemic stroke caused by undiagnosed long-standing high blood pressure, leading to a loss of vision in his left eye.

Parliament of the United Kingdom
Preceded by Peter Soulsby	Member of Parliament for Leicester South; 2011–2024	Succeeded by Shockat Adam
Party political offices
Preceded by Tom Watson	Deputy Chair of the Labour Party; 2013–2016	Succeeded by Position abolished
Political offices
Preceded by Jon Trickett	Shadow Minister without Portfolio; 2015–2016	Succeeded by Andrew Gwynne
Preceded by Diane Abbott	Shadow Secretary of State for Health and Social Care; 2016–2021	Succeeded by Wes Streeting
Preceded by Jonathan Reynolds	Shadow Secretary of State for Work and Pensions; 2021–2023	Succeeded by Liz Kendall
Preceded by Fleur Anderson	Shadow Paymaster General; 2023–2024	Succeeded by John Glen
