= Parmjit Singh Gill =

British Liberal Democrat politician

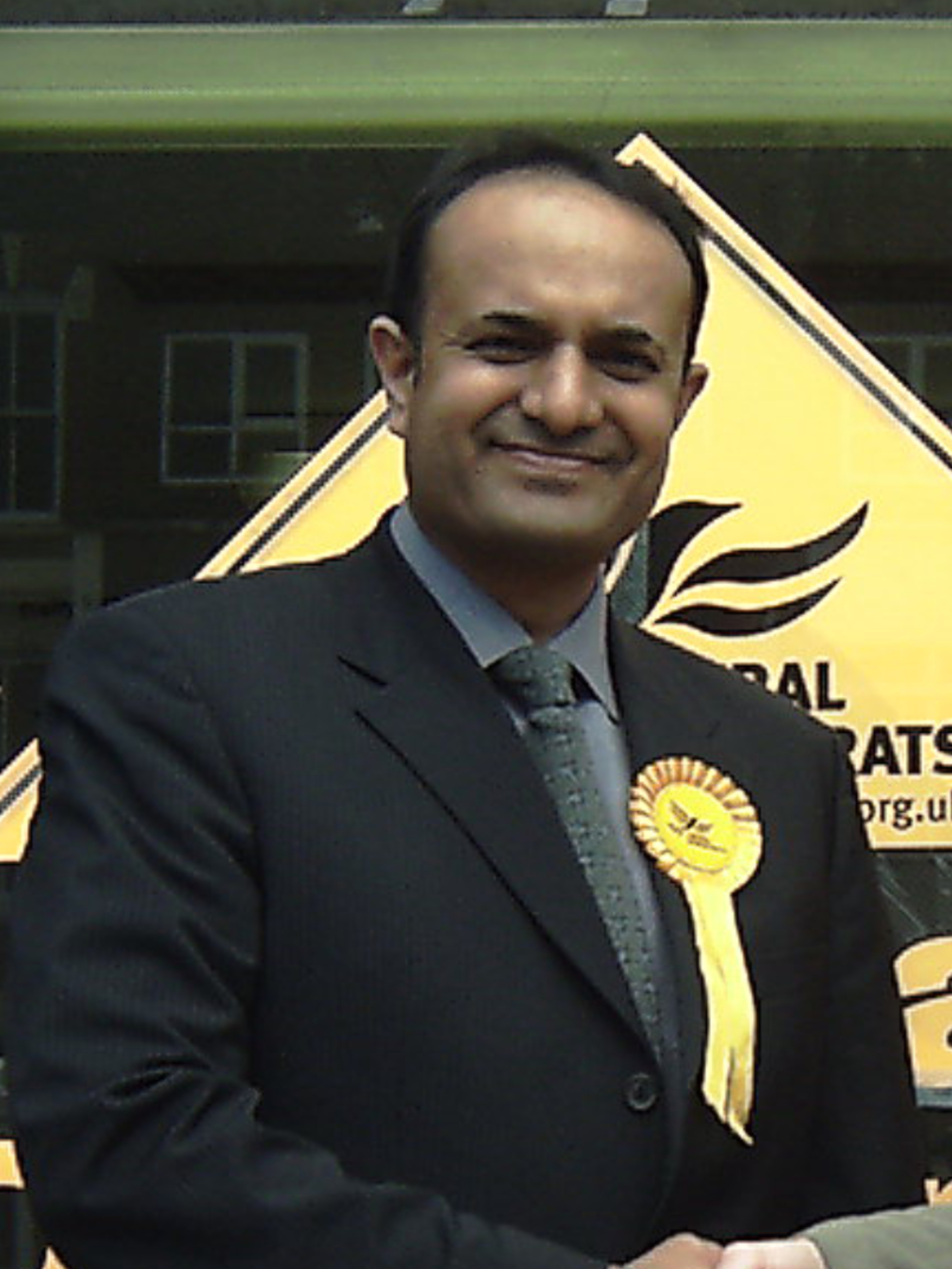

Member of Parliament for Leicester South
- In office 15 July 2004 – 11 April 2005
- Preceded by: Jim Marshall
- Succeeded by: Sir Peter Soulsby
- Majority: 1,654 (5.4%)

Personal details
- Born: 20 December 1966 (age 59) Leicester, England
- Party: Liberal Democrat
- Spouse: Juliet Gill
- Children: 2
- Occupation: Politician

Parmjit Singh Gill (born 20 December 1966) is a British Liberal Democrat politician. As Member of Parliament for Leicester South from July 2004 to May 2005, he was the first ethnic-minority Liberal Democrat MP.

He was first elected as Liberal Democrat councillor for Leicester City Council's Stoneygate Ward, before being elected to the House of Commons at the Leicester South by-election on 15 July 2004. He contested the seat again at the 2005 general election, but this time came second to the Labour Party candidate, Sir Peter Soulsby. He continued to serve as councillor for Stoneygate Ward until he was defeated in May 2011.

He was initially selected to run as the Liberal Democrat candidate for the 2011 Leicester South by-election after Soulsby stood down to run for mayor for Leicester. However, he stood down after a short time, citing family pressures and was replaced by Zuffar Haq.

He works as a local authority information management and security consultant for Charnwood Borough Council. Prior to that he worked as a data protection administrator for Leicester City Council.

Gill was the Liberal Democrat candidate in the 2023 Leicester mayoral election. He came in third place. Gill was the Liberal Democrat candidate in West Bromwich at the 2024 general election and came in sixth place out of seven candidates.

== Personal life ==
He is married to Juliet Gill, and the couple have a son and daughter.

== See also ==
- List of United Kingdom MPs with the shortest service

Parliament of the United Kingdom
Preceded by Jim Marshall	Member of Parliament for Leicester South; 2004 – 2005	Succeeded by Sir Peter Soulsby
