= Peter Soulsby =

British politician (born 1948)

Sir Peter Soulsby
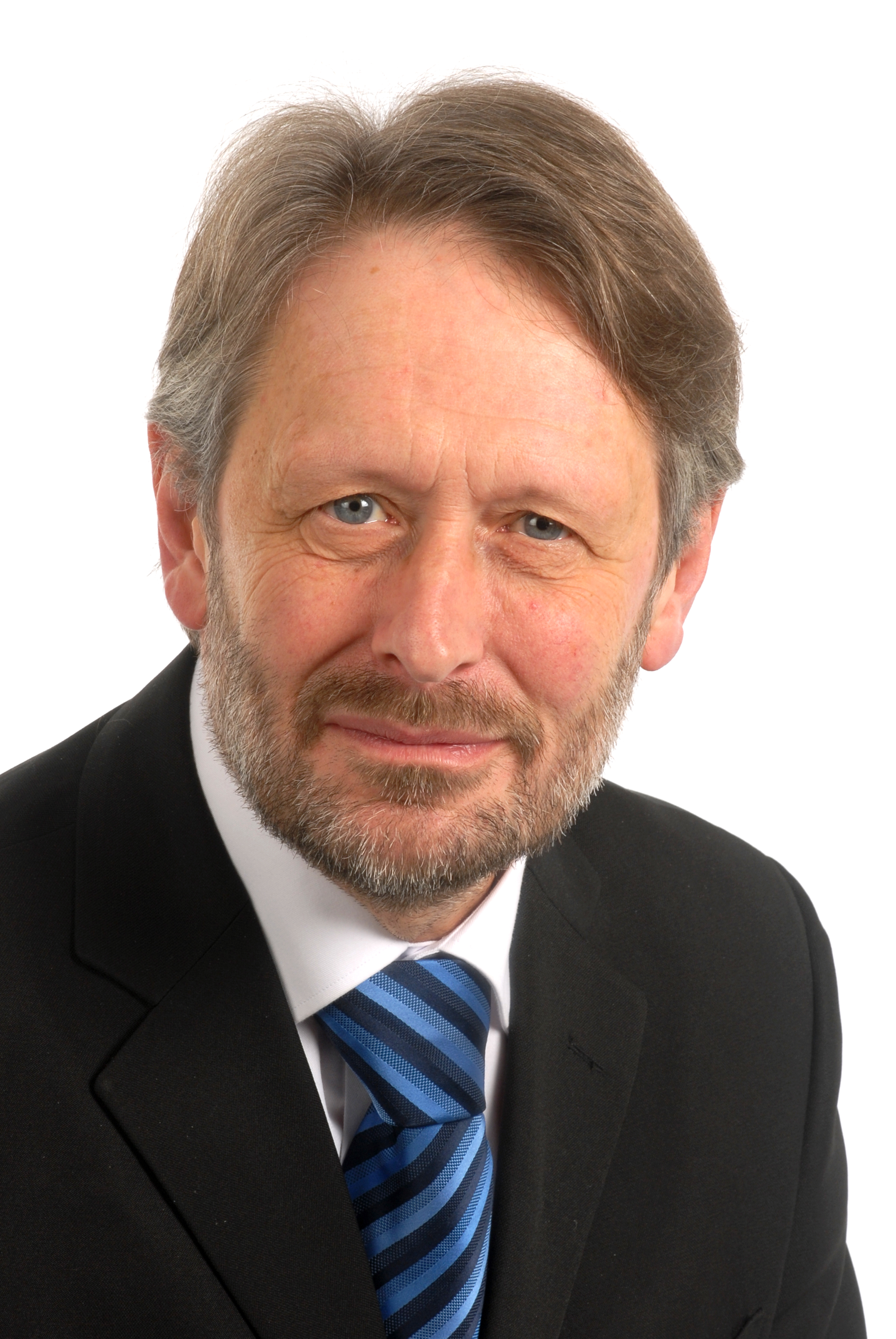
- Soulsby in 2011

Mayor of Leicester
- Incumbent
- Assumed office 9 May 2011
- Preceded by: Office created

Member of Parliament for Leicester South
- In office 5 May 2005 – 1 April 2011
- Preceded by: Parmjit Singh Gill
- Succeeded by: Jonathan Ashworth

Leader of Leicester City Council
- In office January 1996 – May 1999
- Preceded by: Stuart Foster
- Succeeded by: Ross Willmott
- In office May 1981 – May 1994
- Preceded by: Ken Middleton
- Succeeded by: Stuart Foster

Personal details
- Born: 27 December 1948 (age 77) Bishop Auckland, County Durham, England
- Party: Labour
- Spouse: Lady (Alison) Soulsby (d. 2011)
- Domestic partner: Lesley Summerland
- Children: 3
- Education: University of Leicester
- Profession: Teacher, politician
- Website: Leicester Mayor website

Sir Peter Alfred Soulsby (born 27 December 1948) is a British Labour Party politician who has served as Mayor of Leicester since 2011. He was the Member of Parliament (MP) for Leicester South from 2005 until he resigned his seat in April 2011 to contest the new post of mayor. He served as Leader of Leicester City Council from 1981 to 1994 and from 1996 to 1999.

== Early life and education ==
Soulsby was born on 27 December 1948 in Bishop Auckland and attended the Minchenden School, a grammar school in Southgate, London. He studied at the City of Leicester College of Education, Scraptoft. He gained a BEd from the University of Leicester in English and Drama. He worked as a teacher at Crown Hills Secondary Modern School and then as a special needs teacher.

== Early political career ==
He was first elected to Leicester City Council in June 1973 and served as Leader of the Council twice, first from 1981 to 1994 and second from 1996 to 1999. He remained a Labour councillor until he was defeated in the Spinney Hill ward in May 2003.

He unsuccessfully contested the Harborough parliamentary constituency at the 1979 general election. In 1984, he stood for election for the Leicester European Parliamentary constituency, narrowly losing to the Conservative incumbent Fred Tuckman by 1.6%.

== Parliamentary career ==
In 2004, he was the Labour Party's candidate in the Leicester South by-election; he had been the election agent for the previous MP, Jim Marshall, and, like Marshall, was not always in agreement with the party's policies. Despite his anti-war stance, Soulsby lost by 5.6% to Parmjit Singh Gill of the Liberal Democrats in a by-election which was dominated by the Iraq War and the newly formed left-wing party Respect, which took 12.7% of the vote. In the 2005 general election, less than a year later, he won the seat back for Labour from Gill.

On 31 October 2006, Soulsby was one of 12 Labour MPs to back Plaid Cymru and the Scottish National Party's call for an inquiry into the Iraq War. He also rebelled against the government on its proposals to permit the detention of terrorist suspects for 90 days without trial; however, in June 2008, he supported the government on the proposal to extend the detention of terrorist suspects for 42 days (see Terrorism Act 2006). He retained his seat in the 2010 general election with a 5% swing from the Liberal Democrats.

In June 2010, he was selected as a Labour member of the Political and Constitutional Reform Select Committee.

On 5 March 2011, Soulsby was selected as Labour's candidate for the new post of Mayor of Leicester. He resigned as MP for Leicester South to contest the mayoral election. On 1 April 2011, Soulsby was appointed Crown Steward and Bailiff of the Manor of Northstead, effecting his resignation from the House of Commons.

== Mayor of Leicester ==
Soulsby was elected Mayor of Leicester on 5 May 2011, with a majority of 37,260. He had previously served as Leader of Leicester City Council from 1981 to 1994 and from 1996 to 1999. In August 2011, he claimed to have delivered 99 out of 100 pledges within the first 100 days of office. He said the remaining pledge, on the future of the council offices in New Walk, would be achieved by Christmas. However, opposition councillors criticised him for not explaining what services would be cut in future.

He has been re-elected as Mayor of Leicester three times, in 2015, 2019, and 2023.

=== Salary review ===
In November 2011, the Mayor's remuneration committee recommended a salary of £100,000—a rise of £44,000 —based on the fact that the mayor carried out the work of the city's former chief executive, who was paid £175,000. The council was proposing cuts of £70m in services at the time, and the recommendations were criticised by opposing councillors and trade unionists alike. The independence of the committee, which included the vice-chancellor of De Montfort University, the head of the chamber of trade and a charity sector worker, was also challenged by the only Conservative councillor "as they worked closely with Sir Peter". The committee, whose report had been leaked, also recommended reducing the number of councillors and abolishing the post of Lord Mayor. Soulsby dismissed the committee the following day, saying it had made "fundamental costing mistakes" and would have led to "totally unacceptable extra costs".

In March 2012, Soulsby's salary was set at £65,000, at the time comparable to an MP's salary.

=== Bribery allegation and subsequent court case ===
On Thursday 5 May 2016, Mohammed Zameer Khan, a businessman, approached Sir Peter whilst he was outside a city school campaigning for the Labour Party candidate in that day's Police and Crime Commissioner election. Soulsby stated afterwards that Khan had tried to bribe him. Soulsby said the man patted him down and said he wasn't recording, then offered him 10 per cent of any incentive money if Soulsby allowed him to open a bowling alley at the then disused and derelict Haymarket Theatre. Soulsby returned to his council office and wrote a report on the event, which he handed to council lawyers, who informed the police.

In court, Khan stated that he had patted himself down to apologise as he was wearing pyjamas after dropping his child off at school, denied that he said anything about not recording the discussion and stated that he had said that he would give ten per cent to charity and had not offered it as an incentive to Soulsby. Soulsby stated that charity was not mentioned at any point and described the event as "the most blatant attempt to bribe me in forty years of public life". He said that Soulsby was a celebrity and "hero type" and that the encounter overawed him

=== Christmas Day bus lane fine ===
On 25 December 2017, a man who pulled in to a bus stop on Christmas Day to help a homeless man was fined by the council. Lee Williamson said he stopped to give a homeless man a blanket, hat, gloves, scarf, food, and to chat to him. Williamson later received a £70 fine, despite no buses running on 25 December. Leicester City Council said the camera enforcement was an important safety measure. Soulsby confirmed that the penalty would not be enforced, saying, "It was quite clear what Lee was doing was an act of a good Samaritan on Christmas Day and even though it's important to keep this safe... there are exceptions."

=== Breach of COVID-19 restrictions ===
On 14 June 2020, the Leicester Mercury and The Sun published photographs that appeared to show Soulsby breaking lockdown rules by visiting his girlfriend during the COVID-19 pandemic. In response, the leader of the opposition on Leicester City Council, Nigel Porter, and local Liberal Democrat and Conservative councillors called for him to apologise and resign. Soulsby rejected calls to stand aside, and apologised the following day. The BBC quoted him as saying, "It can be certainly interpreted as being against the spirit of the lockdown, if not against the regulations."

== Personal life ==
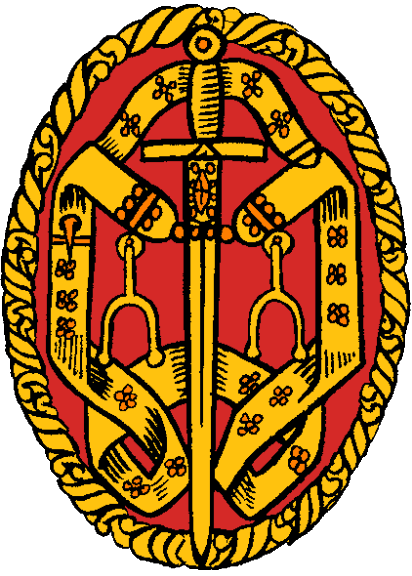
The insignia of a knight bachelor, devised in 1926

Ribbon Bar of a Knight Bachelor

Soulsby was knighted in the 1999 New Year Honours for his services to local government.

He was married to Alison Soulsby, who died of cancer on 10 December 2011, aged 63. He has three daughters and nine grandchildren from his marriage. One of his daughters is Elly Cutkelvin, a councillor for Saffron Ward since 2011, whom Soulsby appointed assistant mayor in 2019.

Parliament of the United Kingdom
Preceded by Parmjit Singh Gill	Member of Parliament for Leicester South; 2005 – 2011	Succeeded by Jonathan Ashworth

Political offices
Preceded by Ken Middleton	Leader of Leicester City Council; 1981–1994	Succeeded by Stuart Foster
Preceded by Stuart Foster	Leader of Leicester City Council; 1996–1999	Succeeded by Ross Willmott
New creation	Mayor of Leicester; 2011–	Incumbent
Preceded by {{{before}}}	Councillor on and Member of Leicester City Council; 1973–2003	Succeeded by {{{after}}}
Preceded by {{{before}}}	Shadow Minister (Environment, Food and Rural Affairs); 2010–2011	Succeeded by {{{after}}}
