= 2004 Leicester South by-election =

United Kingdom Parliament by-election

- 15 July 2004

Leicester South parliamentary seat
- Turnout: 41.6%
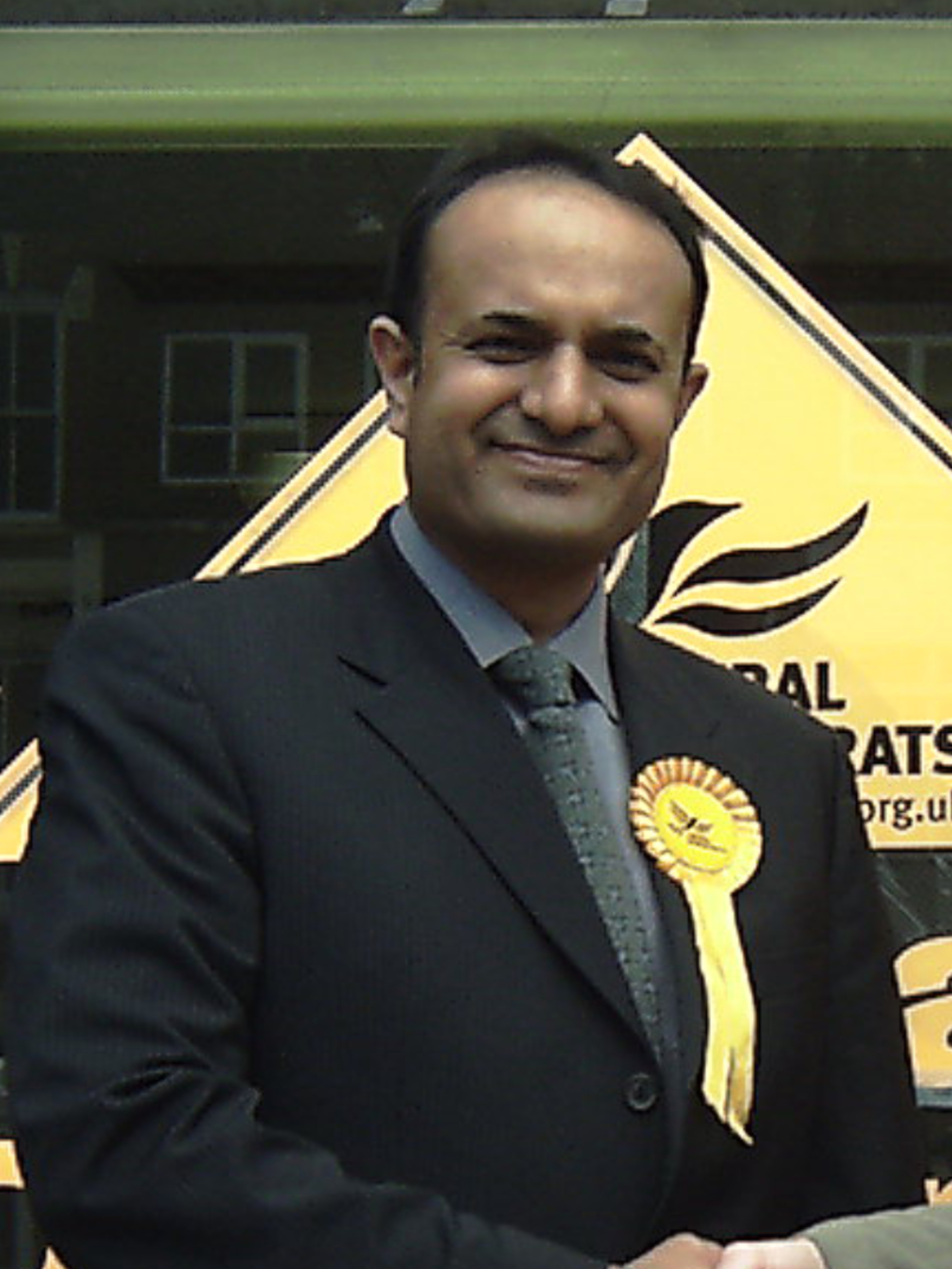

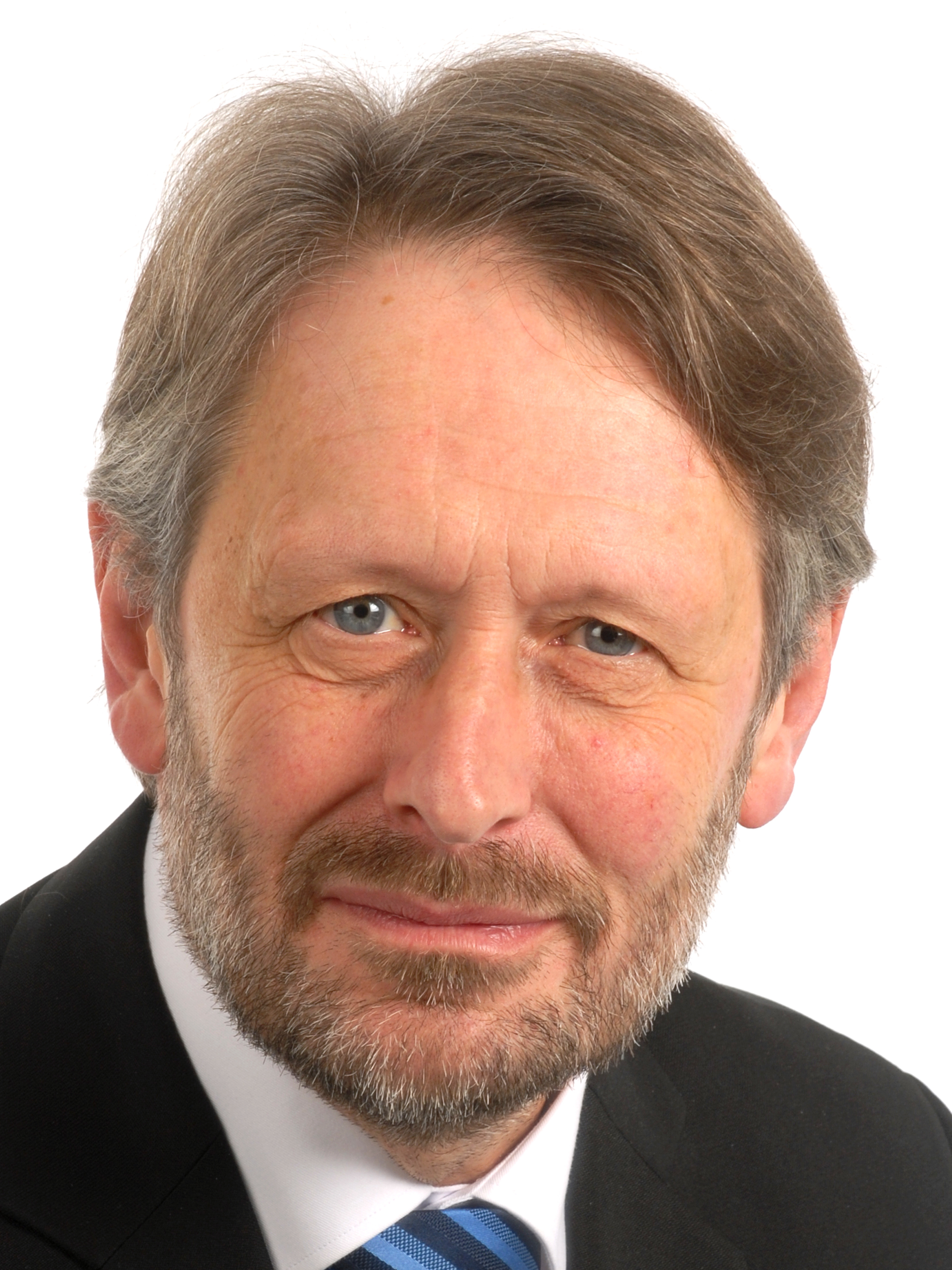

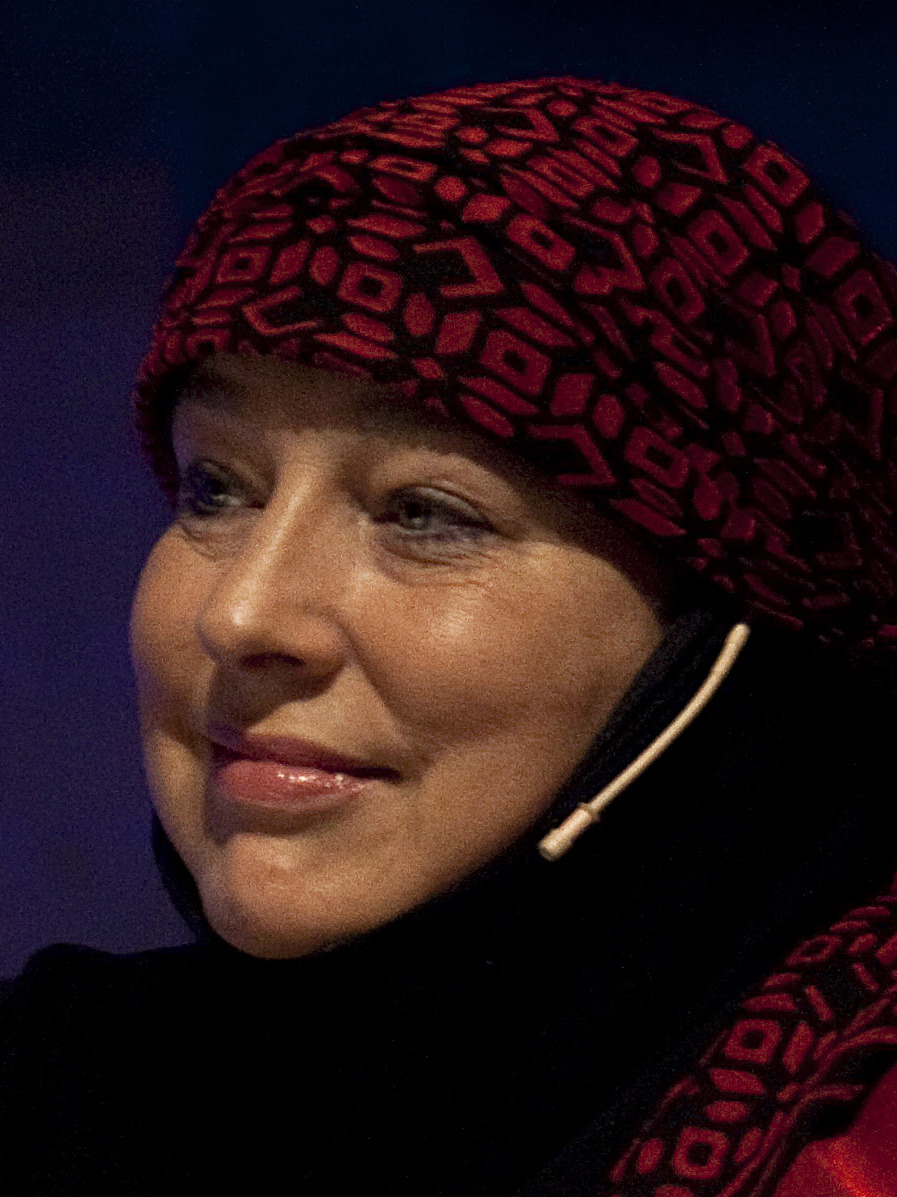
	First party	Second party
Candidate	Parmjit Singh Gill	Peter Soulsby
Party	Liberal Democrats	Labour
Popular vote	10,274	8,620
Percentage	34.9%	29.3%
Swing	▲17.7%	▼25.2%
	Third party	Fourth party
Candidate	Chris Heaton-Harris	Yvonne Ridley
Party	Conservative	Respect
Popular vote	5,796	3,724
Percentage	19.7%	12.7%
Swing	▼3.4%	New party
MP before election
Jim Marshall
Labour
Subsequent MP
Parmjit Singh Gill
Liberal Democrats

A by-election for the United Kingdom parliamentary constituency of Leicester South was held on 15 July 2004, triggered by the death of incumbent Labour Party Member of Parliament (MP) Jim Marshall. It was won by Parmjit Singh Gill of the Liberal Democrats, overturning a Labour majority of 13,243 votes at the 2001 general election.

The by-election was widely considered to effectively be a referendum on the Labour government's policies—most notably its involvement in the ongoing Iraq War. It was the held on the same day as the 2004 Birmingham Hodge Hill by-election, where Labour narrowly fended off a challenge from the Liberal Democrats.

== Background ==
The incumbent Labour Party MP Jim Marshall died on 27 May 2004, shortly before the local and European elections in June, initiating a by-election to fill the seat. Marshall first won the seat in October 1974; he lost the seat to the Conservative Party candidate, Derek Spencer, in the 1983 general election by a mere 7 votes, but won it back at the 1987 election and continually served thereafter. Marshall won the constituency with a majority of 13,243 (31.4%) at the 2001 election.

The constituency is diverse, covering leafy suburbs such as Stoneygate and Knighton along with inner city areas with a strong South Asian community, one of the largest such populations in the UK. The by-election was considered a referendum on Blair's policies, especially the Iraq War, for which Labour had received heavy backlash from Asian and Muslim voters. The war had also been blamed for the party's major losses in the local elections of both 2003 and 2004. Jim Marshall had opposed the war prior to his death.

== Candidates ==
The Labour Party chose Peter Soulsby to fight the by-election. Soulsby had previously been leader of Leicester City Council for 18 years and also acted as the election agent for Jim Marshall at the 2001 general election.

The Liberal Democrats selected Parmjit Singh Gill, who was a councillor on Leicester City Council's Stoneygate Ward and had also been the Leicester South candidate at the 2001 general election. He claimed his central issues would be "Iraq, top-up fees, health and schools" and that he would "be a local MP who will work hard for everyone in our area."

Chris Heaton-Harris was announced as the Conservative candidate, despite having only recently been elected as a Member of the European Parliament (MEP) for the East Midlands. Soulsby criticised this, telling The Guardian: "Leicester South needs a full-time local champion, not a two-jobs who doesn't even live here and who can't make up his mind whether he wants to be in Brussels or Westminster."

Yvonne Ridley, a former journalist who was held in captivity in Afghanistan by the Taliban and later converted to Islam, stood for the Respect Party. "I'm not just fighting this seat to compete," she said. "I'm fighting it to win, and I believe we can win."

Bob Ball was chosen to stand for the Green Party, but later withdrew. The Greens said that they were short of money after the European Parliament elections and wanted to concentrate resources on the next general election.

== Result ==
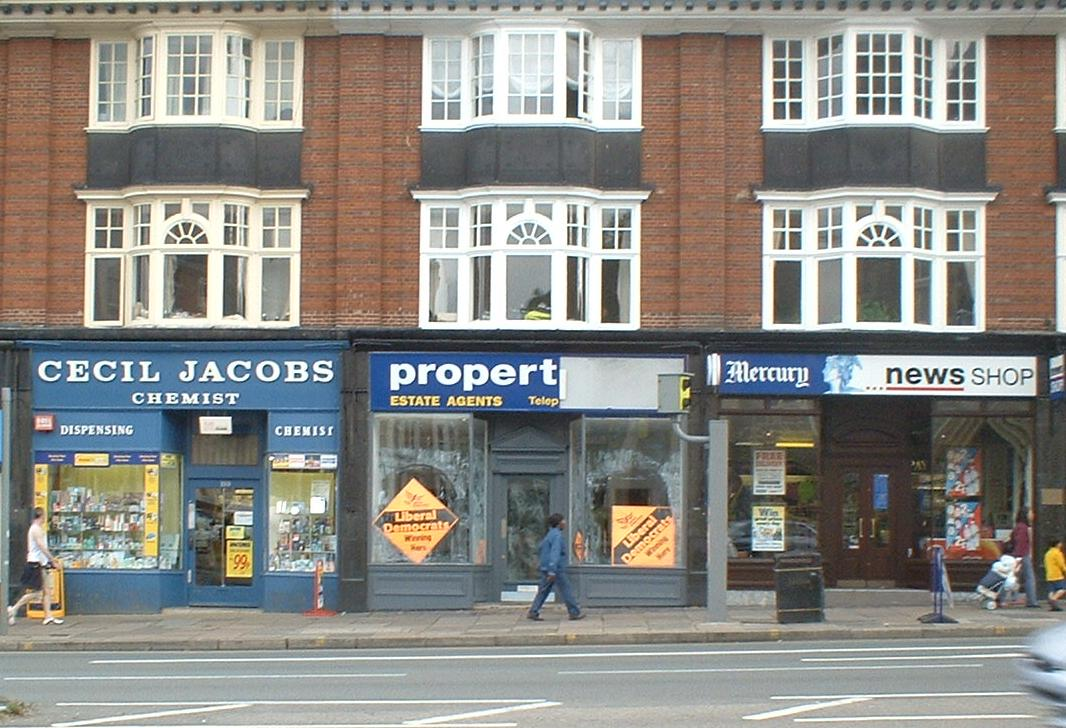
Liberal Democrat posters on London Road.

2004 Leicester South by-election
Party	Candidate	Votes	%	±%
Liberal Democrats	Parmjit Singh Gill	10,274	34.9	+17.7
Labour	Peter Soulsby	8,620	29.3	–25.2
Conservative	Chris Heaton-Harris	5,796	19.7	–3.4
Respect	Yvonne Ridley	3,724	12.7	New
Socialist Labour	Dave Roberts	263	0.9	–0.7
Monster Raving Loony	R. U. Seerius	225	0.8	New
Independent	Pat Kennedy	204	0.7	New
Independent	Paul Lord	186	0.6	New
Independent	Mark Benson	55	0.2	New
Independent	Jitendra Bardwaj	36	0.1	New
Independent	Alan Barrett	25	0.1	New
Majority		1,654	5.6	N/A
Turnout		29,438	41.6	–16.4
Liberal Democrats gain from Labour		Swing	+21.5	

== Previous result ==
General election 2001: Leicester South
Party	Candidate	Votes	%	±%
Labour	Jim Marshall	22,958	54.5	–3.5
Conservative	Richard Hoile	9,715	23.1	–0.7
Liberal Democrats	Parmjit Singh Gill	7,243	17.2	+3.4
Green	Margaret Layton	1,217	2.9	New
Socialist Labour	Arnie Gardner	676	1.6	New
UKIP	Kirti Ladwa	330	0.8	New
Majority		13,243	31.4	−2.9
Turnout		42,139	58.0	−8.3
Labour hold		Swing	-1.4	

== Aftermath ==
In his victory speech, Gill said, "Yesterday, Lord Butler gave his views on Tony Blair's reasoning for backing the invasion of Iraq. Today, people in Leicester have given theirs." He then went on to say, "The justification which Tony Blair gave for backing George Bush was wrong. The people of Leicester South have spoken for the people of Britain. Their message is that the prime minister has abused and lost their trust. He should apologise and he should apologise now."

Labour MP and cabinet minister Patricia Hewitt, who represented neighbouring constituency Leicester West, stated that Iraq was clearly an issue, with the inner city Asian vote swinging decisively to the Lib Dems.

At the 2005 general election, the Liberal Democrats lost the seat to Labour and Peter Soulsby became the new MP for Leicester South.
