= Leicester South =

UK Parliament constituency (since 1974)

Coordinates: 52.60°N 1.14°W

- Borough constituency for the House of Commons
- Interactive map of boundaries since 2024
- Location within the East Midlands
- County: Leicestershire
- Electorate: 71,007 (March 2020)
- Major settlements: Leicester

Current constituency
- Created: 1974
- Member of Parliament: Shockat Adam (Independent Alliance)
- Seats: One
- Created from: Leicester South East and Leicester South West

1918–1950
- Seats: One
- Type of constituency: Borough constituency
- Created from: Leicester
- Replaced by: Leicester South East, Leicester South West and Leicester North East

Leicester South is a constituency, (Note: A borough constituency (for the purposes of election expenses and type of returning officer)) recreated in 1974, represented in the House of Commons of the UK Parliament since the 2024 general election by independent Shockat Adam.

A previous version of the seat existed between 1918 and 1950, during which time it was held mostly by Conservative Party MPs. Since its re-creation in 1974 it has had mostly Labour representation, including from the 2011 byelection until 2024 by the Labour Co-op MP Jonathan Ashworth (the designation denotes that he was a member of both the Labour Party and the Co-operative Party, one of 26 such MPs as of the dissolution of the 2019–2024 Parliament; such members are required to contribute practically to a cooperative business). (Note: As with all constituencies, the constituency elects one Member of Parliament (MP) by the first past the post system of election at least every five years.) In a shock result, Ashworth was defeated by Adam at the 2024 election.

== Constituency profile ==
Leicester South is a constituency in Leicestershire. It covers the city centre of Leicester and the neighbourhoods to its south, including Highfields, Stoneygate, Evington, Knighton and Eyres Monsell. Leicester has a strong association with the textile, clothing and shoemaking industries, which – having suffered a devastating slump in the early 1980s – survived in the city in a vestigial form until recently, but mostly collapsed during the 2020s. This constituency has a large student population, containing as it does the campuses of two universities: the University of Leicester and De Montfort University. Leicester South has some areas with high levels of deprivation, particularly in the city centre and in Eyres Monsell (a large council estate), although Knighton is affluent and suburban. House prices in the constituency are similar to those in the rest of the East Midlands and lower than the national average.

Leicester South is ethnically and religiously diverse. At the 2021 census, Asians were the largest ethnic group at 44% of the population, most of whom were of Indian origin. The Asian community mostly arrived in Leicester during the 1960s and 1970s, with many coming from Uganda as refugees following their expulsion from that country. Dissimilarly to the neighbouring Leicester East constituency, a majority of Asians here are Muslims, with a relatively small Hindu population. White people were 39% of the population in 2021 and Black people were 9%. The constituency is ethnically split by the A6 road; Asians make up an overwhelming majority of residents north-east of the road, while White people are a majority south-west of it.

In general, residents of Leicester South are young and have average levels of education. Household income and homeownership rates are low. A high proportion of residents work in the health and education sectors. A high proportion claim unemployment benefits, and the child poverty rate is nearly double the nationwide figure. On Leicester City Council most of the constituency is represented by the Labour Party, although Green Party councillors were elected in the city centre. Voters in Leicester South strongly supported remaining in the European Union in the 2016 referendum; an estimated 61% voted to remain compared to the nationwide figure of 48%.

== History (since 1974) ==
Although Tom Boardman, previously Conservative MP for Leicester South-West, won Leicester South's first contest following its re-creation, the constituency was thereafter – with just one exception – held by Jim Marshall of the Labour Party until Marshall's death in 2004. That exception was the 1983 general election, at which Conservative candidate Derek Spencer won as Leicester South became the most marginal constituency in the UK, with a majority of just seven votes. Marshall regained the seat in 1987, and the electorate went on to show increased Labour support in local and national elections.

The 2004 by-election caused by Marshall's death was fought under the shadow of the Iraq War, and was won by Parmjit Singh Gill who became at the time the only Liberal Democrat MP from an ethnic minority. He held the seat for a year before being defeated by Labour candidate Sir Peter Soulsby at the 2005 general election. Soulsby subsequently resigned to seek election as Mayor of Leicester in 2011, bringing Leicester South its second by-election in the space of seven years; this time (the poll coinciding with the referendum on the voting system) the seat was safely held by Jonathan Ashworth for Labour. Ashworth was re-elected in 2015, 2017 and 2019.

Despite being the only constituency in the city to have been represented by three parties in the previous 40 years, Leicester South became regarded as the safest of the Labour seats in the city, with a majority in 2017 of 26,261 votes (52.0%), falling to 22,675 (45.2%) in 2019. However, the constituency's historic volatility continued, with Ashworth suffering a surprise defeat in the July 2024 general election. The seat was won by Shockat Adam standing as an independent, with a narrow majority of 979 votes (2.3%).

== Boundaries ==
=== Historic ===
1918–1950: The county borough of Leicester wards of Aylestone, Castle, Charnwood, De Montfort, Knighton, Martin's, and Wycliffe.

The initial report of the Boundary Commission for England, dated October 1947 and published in December 1947, recommended that Leicester retain three seats, including a revised Leicester South constituency consisting of the wards of Aylestone, De Montfort, Knighton, North Braunstone and Spinney Hill, giving an electorate of 67,574 as of the review date of 15 October 1946. When the Representation of the People Bill enacting the commission's recommendations was debated in the House of Commons, the Government brought forward amendments at Committee stage on 24 March 1948 to allow 17 more constituencies in England. Home Secretary James Chuter Ede announced that the Boundary Commission would be invited to consider assigning an additional constituency to each of nine cities, including Leicester. The Government issued a white paper proposing the new boundaries, which created new borough constituencies of Leicester South East and Leicester South West in place of Leicester South. The Boundary Commission recommended no alteration to the proposals, and the revised constituencies were therefore enacted.

In 1969, the Second Periodical Report of the Parliamentary Boundary Commission for England reduced Leicester from four seats to three, and recreated Leicester South as a borough constituency.

1974–1983: The county borough of Leicester wards of Aylestone, De Montfort, Knighton, Spinney Hill, The Castle, and Wycliffe wards of Leicester.

1983–2010: The City of Leicester wards of Aylestone, Castle, Crown Hills, East Knighton, Eyres Monsell, Saffron, Spinney Hill, Stoneygate, West Knighton and Wycliffe.

Minor boundary changes were made as a result of the Third Periodical Report of the Boundary Commission in 1983. The new constituency took in about 3,000 voters who were previously in other Leicester seats. No changes were made in the Fourth Periodical Report of the Boundary Commission in 1995.

2010–2024: The City of Leicester wards of Aylestone, Castle, Eyres Monsell, Freemen, Knighton, Spinney Hills, and Stoneygate.

In the Fifth Periodical Report of the Boundary Commission in 2007, the constituency had only a minor alteration, with 73 voters being added from Leicester West.

Further to a local government boundary review which became effective in May 2015, the Freemen ward was replaced by the Saffron ward and the additional Wycliffe ward was created, largely split off from the Spinney Hills ward.

=== Current ===
The City of Leicester wards of Castle, Evington (small part), Eyres Monsell, Knighton, Saffron, Spinney Hills, Stoneygate, and Wycliffe.

Following the 2023 review of Westminster constituencies, which came into effect for the 2024 general election, the size of the constituency was reduced with the transfer of Aylestone ward to Leicester West. To partly compensate, polling district EVF in Evington ward was added from Leicester East.

== Members of Parliament ==
=== MPs 1918–1950 ===
Leicester prior to 1918

Election	Member	Party
1918	Thomas Blane	Conservative
1922	William George Waterhouse Reynolds	Conservative
1923	Ronald Wilberforce Allen	Liberal
1924	Charles Waterhouse	Conservative
1945	Herbert Bowden	Labour
1950	constituency abolished	

=== MPs since 1974 ===
Leicester South East and Leicester South West prior to 1974

Election	Member	Party
Feb 1974	Tom Boardman	Conservative
Oct 1974	Jim Marshall	Labour
1983	Derek Spencer	Conservative
1987	Jim Marshall	Labour
2004 by-election	Parmjit Singh Gill	Liberal Democrat
2005	Sir Peter Soulsby	Labour
2011 by-election	Jonathan Ashworth	Labour and Co-operative
2024	Shockat Adam	Independent

== Elections ==
=== Elections in the 2020s ===
General election 2024: Leicester South
Party	Candidate	Votes	%	±%
Independent	Shockat Adam	14,739	35.2	N/A
Labour	Jonathan Ashworth	13,760	32.9	–35.3
Conservative	Gerri Hickton	4,820	11.5	–10.3
Green	Sharmen Rahman	3,826	9.1	+5.8
Reform	Craig Harwood	2,470	5.9	+3.6
Liberal Democrats	Carol Weaver	1,425	3.4	–0.9
Independent	Osman Admani	329	0.8	N/A
Communist	Ann Green	279	0.7	N/A
Monster Raving Loony	Ezechiel Adlore	189	0.5	N/A
Majority		979	2.3	N/A
Turnout		41,837	59.1	–7.8
Registered electors		70,867		
Independent gain from Labour		Swing		

=== Elections in the 2010s ===
General election 2019: Leicester South
Party	Candidate	Votes	%	±%
Labour Co-op	Jonathan Ashworth	33,606	67.0	−6.6
Conservative	Natalie Neale	10,931	21.8	+0.2
Liberal Democrats	Chris Coghlan	2,754	5.5	+3.0
Green	Mags Lewis	1,669	3.3	+1.0
Brexit Party	James Potter	1,187	2.4	New
Majority		22,675	45.2	−6.8
Turnout		50,147	64.6	−2.4
Labour Co-op hold		Swing	-3.35	

General election 2017: Leicester South
Party	Candidate	Votes	%	±%
Labour Co-op	Jonathan Ashworth	37,157	73.6	+13.8
Conservative	Meera Sonecha	10,896	21.6	+0.7
Liberal Democrats	Harrish Bishnauthsing	1,287	2.5	−2.1
Green	Mags Lewis	1,177	2.3	−3.2
Majority		26,261	52.0	+13.1
Turnout		50,517	67.0	+4.5
Labour Co-op hold		Swing	+6.56	

General election 2015: Leicester South
Party	Candidate	Votes	%	±%
Labour Co-op	Jonathan Ashworth	27,493	59.8	+14.2
Conservative	Leon Hadji-Nikolaou	9,628	20.9	−0.5
UKIP	Peter Stone	3,832	8.3	+6.8
Green	Gabriella Garcia	2,533	5.5	+3.9
Liberal Democrats	Anita Prabhakar	2,127	4.6	−22.3
TUSC	Andrew Walton	349	0.8	New
Majority		17,845	38.9	+20.2
Turnout		45,962	62.5	+1.4
Labour Co-op hold		Swing	+7.4	

By-election 2011: Leicester South
Party	Candidate	Votes	%	±%
Labour	Jonathan Ashworth	19,771	57.8	+12.2
Liberal Democrats	Zuffar Haq	7,693	22.5	−4.4
Conservative	Jane Hunt	5,169	15.1	−6.3
UKIP	Abhijit Pandya	994	2.9	+1.4
Monster Raving Loony	Howling Laud Hope	553	1.6	New
Majority		12,078	35.3	+16.6
Turnout		34,180	45.0	−3.0
Labour Co-op hold		Swing		

General election 2010: Leicester South
Party	Candidate	Votes	%	±%
Labour	Peter Soulsby	21,479	45.6	+6.2
Liberal Democrats	Parmjit Singh Gill	12,671	26.9	−3.7
Conservative	Ross Grant	10,066	21.4	+3.6
BNP	Adrian Waudby	1,418	3.0	New
Green	Dave Dixey	770	1.6	−1.6
UKIP	Christopher Lucas	720	1.5	New
Majority		8,808	18.7	+9.9
Turnout		47,124	61.1	+3.4
Labour hold		Swing	+5.0	

=== Elections in the 2000s ===
General election 2005: Leicester South
Party	Candidate	Votes	%	±%
Labour	Peter Soulsby	16,688	39.3	−15.2
Liberal Democrats	Parmjit Singh Gill	12,971	30.6	+13.4
Conservative	Martin McElwee	7,549	17.8	−5.3
Respect	Yvonne Ridley	2,720	6.4	N/A
Green	Matthew Follett	1,379	3.3	+0.4
Veritas	Ken Roseblade	573	1.4	New
Socialist Labour	Dave Roberts	315	0.7	−0.9
Independent	Paul Lord	216	0.5	N/A
Majority		3,717	8.8	−22.6
Turnout		42,411	58.7	+0.7
Labour hold		Swing		

By-election 2004: Leicester South
Party	Candidate	Votes	%	±%
Liberal Democrats	Parmjit Singh Gill	10,274	34.9	+17.7
Labour	Peter Soulsby	8,620	29.3	−25.2
Conservative	Chris Heaton-Harris	5,796	19.7	−3.4
Respect	Yvonne Ridley	3,724	12.7	New
Socialist Labour	Dave Roberts	263	0.9	−0.7
Monster Raving Loony	R. U. Seerius	225	0.8	New
Independent	Pat Kennedy	204	0.7	New
Independent	Paul Lord	186	0.6	New
Independent	Mark Benson	55	0.2	New
Independent	Jitendra Bardwaj	36	0.1	New
Independent	Alan Barrett	25	0.1	New
Majority		1,654	5.6	N/A
Turnout		29,438	41.6	−16.4
Liberal Democrats gain from Labour		Swing	+21.5	

General election 2001: Leicester South
Party	Candidate	Votes	%	±%
Labour	Jim Marshall	22,958	54.5	−3.5
Conservative	Richard Hoile	9,715	23.1	−0.7
Liberal Democrats	Parmjit Singh Gill	7,243	17.2	+3.4
Green	Margaret Layton	1,217	2.9	New
Socialist Labour	Arnie Gardner	676	1.6	New
UKIP	Kirti Ladwa	330	0.8	New
Majority		13,243	31.4	−2.9
Turnout		42,139	58.0	−8.3
Labour hold		Swing	-1.4	

=== Elections in the 1990s ===
General election 1997: Leicester South
Party	Candidate	Votes	%	±%
Labour	Jim Marshall	27,914	58.0	+5.7
Conservative	Chris Heaton-Harris	11,421	23.7	−10.9
Liberal Democrats	Barry Coles	6,654	13.8	+2.1
Referendum	John Hancock	1,184	2.5	New
Socialist Labour	Jim Dooher	634	1.3	New
National Democrats	Kevin Sills	307	0.6	New
Majority		16,493	34.3	+16.6
Turnout		48,194	66.3	−8.8
Labour hold		Swing	+8.3	

General election 1992: Leicester South
Party	Candidate	Votes	%	±%
Labour	Jim Marshall	27,934	52.3	+8.1
Conservative	Michael K. Dutt	18,494	34.6	−6.2
Liberal Democrats	Anne Crumbie	6,271	11.7	−2.1
Green	John McWhirter	554	1.0	+0.3
Natural Law	Patricia A. Saunders	154	0.3	New
Majority		9,440	17.7	+14.3
Turnout		53,407	75.1	−1.9
Labour hold		Swing	+7.2	

=== Elections in the 1980s ===
General election 1987: Leicester South
Party	Candidate	Votes	%	±%
Labour	Jim Marshall	24,901	44.2	+3.9
Conservative	Derek Spencer	23,024	40.8	+0.5
Liberal	Robert Pritchard	7,773	13.8	−3.9
Green	Brian Fewster	390	0.7	−0.2
Independent Labour	Mian Mayat	192	0.3	New
Workers Revolutionary	Robert Manners	96	0.2	New
Majority		1,877	3.4	N/A
Turnout		56,376	77.0	+4.7
Labour gain from Conservative		Swing	+1.7	

General election 1983: Leicester South
Party	Candidate	Votes	%	±%
Conservative	Derek Spencer	21,424	40.3	−2.3
Labour	Jim Marshall	21,417	40.3	−6.1
Liberal	Rob Renold	9,410	17.7	+8.5
Ecology	C. Davis	495	0.9	New
BNP	C. Pickard	280	0.6	New
Socialist Workers (Indian Workers' Association)	Dave Roberts	161	0.3	New
Majority		7	0.0	N/A
Turnout		53,187	72.3	−2.5
Conservative gain from Labour		Swing	+1.9	

The Conservatives' 7 vote majority made Leicester South their most marginal constituency after the 1983 election and was the closest result in any constituency in the United Kingdom in the election.

=== Elections in the 1970s ===
General election 1979: Leicester South
Party	Candidate	Votes	%	±%
Labour	Jim Marshall	24,548	46.4	+3.2
Conservative	Ray Godsall	22,550	42.6	+1.7
Liberal	John Pick	4,856	9.2	−2.2
National Front	A. R. Cartwright	940	1.8	−2.3
Majority		1,998	3.8	+1.5
Turnout		52,894	74.8	+5.9
Labour hold		Swing		

General election October 1974: Leicester South
Party	Candidate	Votes	%	±%
Labour	Jim Marshall	21,588	43.2	+4.6
Conservative	Tom Boardman	20,455	40.9	−0.9
Liberal	H. Young	5,709	11.4	−5.3
National Front	A. R. Cartwright	2,072	4.1	+1.1
Marxist-Leninist (England)	G. H. Rousseau	136	0.3	New
Majority		1,133	2.3	N/A
Turnout		49,960	68.9	−7.5
Labour gain from Conservative		Swing		

General election February 1974: Leicester South
Party	Candidate	Votes	%	±%
Conservative	Tom Boardman	22,943	41.8	
Labour	Jim Marshall	21,177	38.6	
Liberal	Gordon Willey	9,148	16.7	
National Front	John Kynaston	1,639	3.0	
Majority		1,766	3.2	
Turnout		54,907	76.4	
Conservative win (new seat)				

=== Elections in the 1940s ===
General election 1945: Leicester South
Party	Candidate	Votes	%	±%
Labour	Herbert Bowden	19,541	45.0	+10.0
Conservative	Charles Waterhouse	18,373	42.3	+7.3
Liberal	Thomas Allan Pratt	5,509	12.7	New
Majority		1,168	2.7	N/A
Turnout		43,423	76.8	+6.6
Labour gain from Conservative		Swing		

=== Elections in the 1930s ===
General election 1935: Leicester South
Party	Candidate	Votes	%	±%
Conservative	Charles Waterhouse	24,868	65.0	−11.8
Labour	Leslie Maddock	13,395	35.0	+11.8
Majority		11,473	30.0	−23.6
Turnout		38,263	70.2	−8.5
Conservative hold		Swing		

General election 1931: Leicester South
Party	Candidate	Votes	%	±%
Conservative	Charles Waterhouse	32,767	76.8	+34.5
Labour	John Dugdale	9,892	23.2	−14.2
Majority		22,875	53.6	+48.7
Turnout		42,659	78.7	−1.7
Conservative hold		Swing		

=== Elections in the 1920s ===
Purchase

General election 1929: Leicester South
Party	Candidate	Votes	%	±%
Unionist	Charles Waterhouse	18,343	42.3	−7.7
Labour	Herbert Brough Usher	16,198	37.4	+7.7
Liberal	Henry Purchase	8,811	20.3	0.0
Majority		2,145	4.9	−15.4
Turnout		43,352	80.4	−1.1
Registered electors		53,890		
Unionist hold		Swing	−7.7	

General election 1924: Leicester South
Party	Candidate	Votes	%	±%
Unionist	Charles Waterhouse	15,005	50.0	+7.9
Labour	Herbert Brough Usher	8,912	29.7	New
Liberal	Ronald Wilberforce Allen	6,079	20.3	−37.6
Majority		6,093	20.3	N/A
Turnout		29,996	81.5	+10.5
Registered electors		36,805		
Unionist gain from Liberal		Swing	+22.8	

General election 1923: Leicester South
Party	Candidate	Votes	%	±%
Liberal	Ronald Wilberforce Allen	14,692	57.9	+8.1
Unionist	William George Waterhouse Reynolds	10,674	42.1	−8.1
Majority		4,018	15.8	N/A
Turnout		25,366	71.0	−0.7
Registered electors		35,710		
Liberal gain from Unionist		Swing	+8.1	

General election 1922: Leicester South
Party	Candidate	Votes	%	±%
Unionist	William George Waterhouse Reynolds	12,534	50.2	−27.0
Liberal	Ronald Wilberforce Allen	12,425	49.8	New
Majority		109	0.4	−54.0
Turnout		24,959	71.7	+5.0
Registered electors		34,789		
Unionist hold		Swing	−27.0	

=== Elections in the 1910s ===
General election 1918: Leicester South
Party		Candidate	Votes	%	±%
C	Unionist	Thomas Blane	18,498	77.2	
	Labour	Frederick Fox Riley	5,463	22.8	
Majority			13,035	54.4	
Turnout			23,961	66.7	
Registered electors			35,909		
	Unionist win (new seat)				
C indicates candidate endorsed by the coalition government.

== See also ==
- List of parliamentary constituencies in Leicestershire and Rutland
