= William George Waterhouse Reynolds =

British businessman (1860–1928)

William George Waterhouse Reynolds (1860–1928) was Conservative MP for Leicester South.

A corset manufacturer, he won the seat in 1922 when the previous Conservative MP stood down, narrowly beating the Liberal, but lost it to the Liberals in 1923.

== Sources ==
- Craig, F.W.S., ed. (1969) British parliamentary election results 1918-1949 Glasgow: Political Reference Publications. p. 437. ISBN 0-900178-01-9.
- Whitaker's Almanack 1923 and 1924 editions
- The Constitutional Year Book (1933), p. 198
- The Constitutional Year Book (1930), p. 234
