= Jim Marshall (British politician) =

British politician (1941–2004)

Jim Marshall MP

Member of Parliament for Leicester South
- In office 11 June 1987 – 27 May 2004
- Preceded by: Derek Spencer
- Succeeded by: Parmjit Singh Gill
- In office 10 October 1974 – 13 May 1983
- Preceded by: Tom Boardman
- Succeeded by: Derek Spencer

Personal details
- Born: 13 March 1941 Sheffield
- Died: 27 May 2004 (aged 63) Leicester
- Party: Labour
- Spouse(s): Shirley Ellis (div.); Susan Carter
- Education: University of Leeds

James Marshall (13 March 1941 – 27 May 2004) was a Labour Party politician in the United Kingdom.

== Education ==
Marshall was born into a working-class family in the Attercliffe district of Sheffield. He was educated at Sheffield City Grammar School (now called The City School) on Orchard Lane and the University of Leeds, gaining a BSc in Physics in 1963 and a PhD in 1968. He worked as a research scientist at the Wool Industries Research Association (which became the Wira Technology Group, then British Textile Technology Group) in West Park, Leeds from 1963 to 1967. He was a councillor on Leeds City Council from 1965 to 1969.

== Politics ==
In 1968, he became a lecturer at Leicester Polytechnic, remaining until 1974. In 1971, he was elected to Leicester City Council, becoming leader of the council in 1973. He contested the Harborough seat in the 1970 general election. In the February general election of 1974 he contested the constituency of Leicester South, and unseated the Conservative MP, Tom Boardman, in the October election that year. He held the seat until his death, with the exception of the period 1983–1987, when he lost the seat to the Conservative Derek Spencer by seven votes in the 1983 national election. During his time out of parliament, he worked as a supply teacher and market trader, developing a stronger, more community-oriented reputation.

Marshall was an assistant whip between 1977 and the end of James Callaghan's government in 1979. In opposition, he was assistant home affairs spokesman from 1982 to 1983, serving just below Roy Hattersley in Michael Foot's shadow cabinet. He was deputy shadow spokesman on Northern Ireland from 1987 to 1992, serving under Kevin McNamara in Neil Kinnock's shadow cabinet. In the 1992 Labour Party leadership election, which followed the resignation of Kinnock, he voted for Bryan Gould, seen as the left-wing candidate. The victorious candidate, John Smith, dispensed with Marshall's services, and Marshall's support for Margaret Beckett in the 1994 leadership election occasioned by Smith's death did not endear him to subsequent leader Tony Blair. Increasingly out of step with the mainstream of the Labour Party, he concentrated on constituency matters. He rebelled against Blair's government many times, chiefly on matters relating to immigration and education. His constituency work, especially on immigration and benefit problems, won him strong personal support among local voters. Labour party chairman Ian McCartney described him as "a hard-working and dedicated member of parliament who spoke up for his Leicester constituents and did a great deal to help to transform their communities and the opportunities open to them."

== Personal life and death ==
Marshall married Shirley Ellis on 9 June 1962 in Sheffield, and they had a son and daughter. They divorced and he married Susan Carter on 15 July 1986 in Leicester.

On 27 May 2004, Marshall died suddenly and unexpectedly of a heart attack, precipitating a by-election dominated by the invasion of Iraq (which he had opposed).

Parliament of the United Kingdom
Preceded by Thomas Boardman	Member of Parliament for Leicester South; 1974–1983	Succeeded by Derek Spencer
Preceded by Derek Spencer	Member of Parliament for Leicester South; 1987–2004	Succeeded by Parmjit Singh Gill
