= Mayor of Leicester =

Office in England

- Arms of Leicester City Council

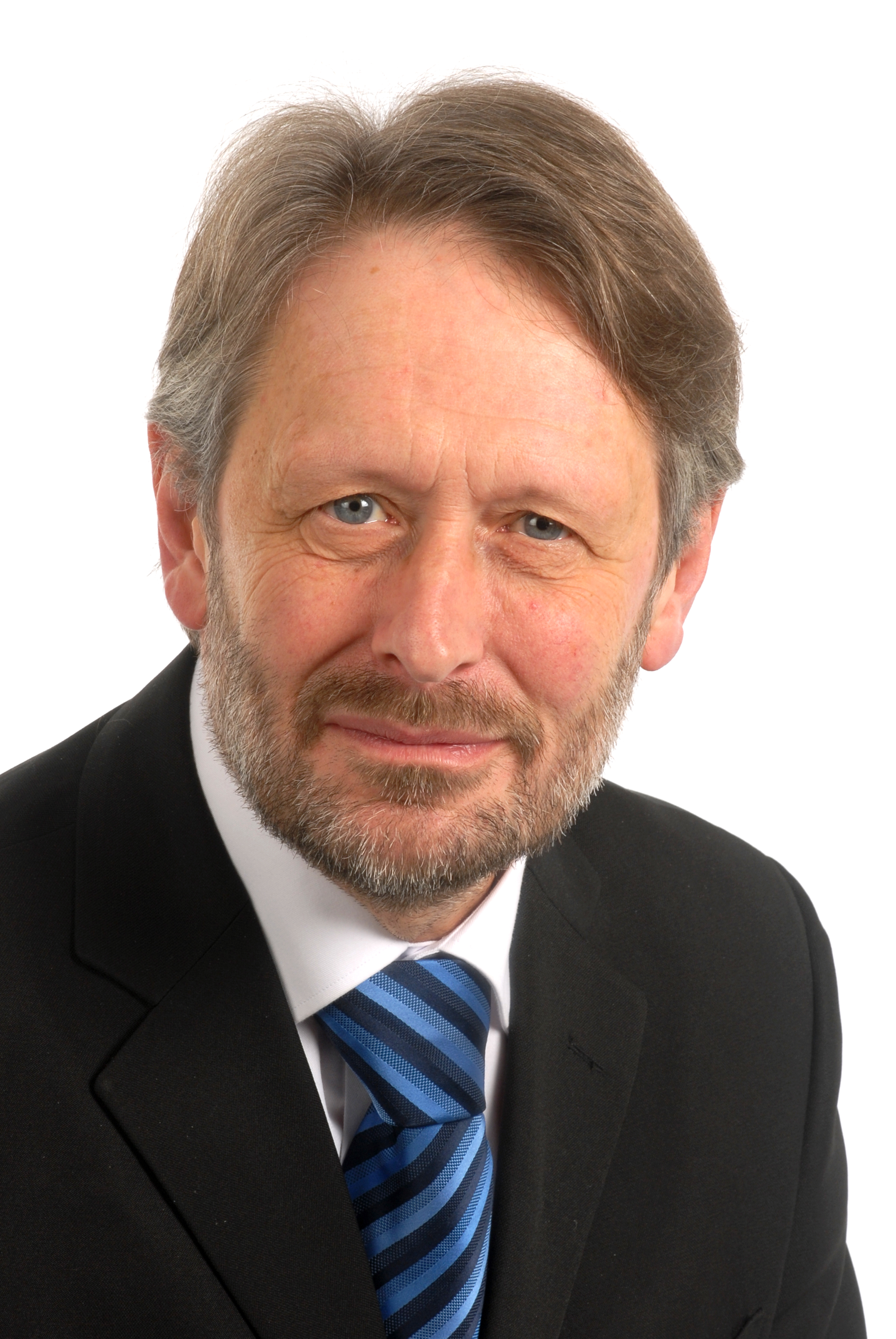
- Incumbent; Peter Soulsby since 6 May 2011
- Style: City Mayor (to distinguish from Lord Mayor)
- Seat: City Hall, Leicester
- Appointer: Electorate of Leicester
- Term length: Four years
- Inaugural holder: Peter Soulsby
- Website: Leicester Mayor website

The Mayor of Leicester, styled City Mayor to distinguish from the Lord Mayor of Leicester, is the directly elected local authority mayor responsible for the executive function of Leicester City Council in England. The incumbent is Peter Soulsby of the Labour Party.

== Background ==
In December 2010 the Labour controlled Leicester City Council approved plans to give the city a directly elected mayor with responsibility for all council decisions during their four-year term and for selecting up to nine councillors as a supporting cabinet in accordance with the provisions of the Local Government Act 2007. The creation of the post was approved by the City Council on 10 December 2010. A referendum on establishing a directly elected mayoralty was not held. The first election took place in May 2011.

== Elections ==
=== 2011 ===
The first mayoral election on 5 May 2011 saw Peter Soulsby elected as mayor in the first round.

Leicester Mayoral Election 5 May 2011
Party	Candidate	1st round		2nd round			1st round votesTransfer votes, 2nd round
Party	Candidate	Total	Of round	Transfers	Total	Of round	1st round votesTransfer votes, 2nd round
Labour	Peter Soulsby	46,948	55.3%				
Conservative	Ross Grant	9,688	11.4%				
Independent	Rick Moore	7,365	8.7%				
Liberal Democrats	Gary Hunt	6,029	7.1%				
Green	Geoff Forse	3,452	4.1%				
Independent	Nima Patel	3,358	4.0%				
UKIP	Regine Anderson	2,195	2.6%				
Unity for Peace and Socialism	Mohinda Farma	1,944	2.3%				
Independent	David Bowley	1,784	2.1%				
Independent	Mu-Hamid Pathan	1,465	1.7%				
Independent	Lee Sowden	631	0.7%				
Labour win							

=== 2015 ===
Soulsby won re-election in 2015, again polling more than half the first preference vote to win on the first round.

Leicester Mayoral Election 7 May 2015
Party	Candidate	1st round		2nd round			1st round votesTransfer votes, 2nd round
Party	Candidate	Total	Of round	Transfers	Total	Of round	1st round votesTransfer votes, 2nd round
Labour	Peter Soulsby	71,533	54.6%				
Conservative	Paul Bremner	24,327	18.6%				
UKIP	Dutch Veldhuizen	12,532	9.6%				
Green	Tim Grayson	8,637	6.6%				
Liberal Democrats	Adrian Barnes	8,315	6.3%				
TUSC	Barbie Potter	3,028	2.3%				
Independent	Avtar Singh	2,662	2.0%				
Labour hold							

=== 2019 ===
Again, Soulsby won re-election in 2019, retaining his position as City Mayor for a third term, with an increased majority.

Leicester Mayoral Election 2 May 2019
Party	Candidate	1st round		2nd round			1st round votesTransfer votes, 2nd round
Party	Candidate	Total	Of round	Transfers	Total	Of round	1st round votesTransfer votes, 2nd round
Labour	Peter Soulsby	51,444	61.0%				
Conservative	Sandip Verma	14,519	17.2%				
Green	Mags Lewis	6,659	7.9%				
Liberal Democrats	Nigel Porter	4,101	5.0%				
UKIP	Stuart Young	3,525	4.2%				
Independent	Sanjay Gogia	2,445	2.9%				
Socialist Alternative	Stephen Score	1,643	2.0%				
Labour hold							

=== 2023 ===
Leicester Mayoral Election 4 May 2023
Party	Candidate	Votes	%	±%
Labour	Peter Soulsby	35,002	39.3	▼21.7
Conservative	Sanjay Modhwadia	26,422	29.7	▲12.5
Liberal Democrats	Parmjit Singh Gill	9,674	10.9	▲5.9
Independent	Rita Patel	7,966	8.9	New
Green	Mags Lewis	7,808	8.8	▲0.9
TUSC	Steve Score	2,173	2.4	▲0.4
Majority		8,580	9.6	▼34.2
Turnout		89,045 (Note: This total does not include spoilt ballots.)	36.5	▲1.7
Labour hold		Swing	▼17.1	

== List of mayors ==
Political party	Name	Election
Labour	Peter Soulsby	6 May 2011
