= Leicester City Council elections =

Local government elections in Leicestershire, England

Leicester City Council elections are held every four years. Leicester City Council is the local authority for the unitary authority of Leicester in Leicestershire, England. Until 1 April 1997 it was a non-metropolitan district. Since 2011 it has also had a directly elected mayor. Since the last boundary changes in 2015, 54 councillors have been elected from 21 wards.

== Results ==
Political group	Councillors								
Political group	1996	1999	2003	2007	2011	2015	2019	2023	Current
Labour	41	30	20	38	52	52	53	31	31
Liberal Democrat	8	16	25	6	1	1	1	3	3
Conservative	7	10	9	8	1	1	0	17	17
Green	0	0	0	2	0	0	0	3	3
Independent	0	0	0	0	0	0	0	0	0
Total	56	56	54	54	54	54	54	54	54

== Council elections ==
- 1973 Leicester City Council election
- 1976 Leicester City Council election
- 1979 Leicester City Council election
- 1983 Leicester City Council election (New ward boundaries)
- 1984 Leicester City Council election
- 1986 Leicester City Council election
- 1987 Leicester City Council election
- 1991 Leicester City Council election (City boundary changes took place but the number of seats remained the same)
- 1995 Leicester City Council election
- 1996 Leicester City Council election
- 1998 Leicester City Council election
- 1999 Leicester City Council election
- 2003 Leicester City Council election (New ward boundaries reduced the number of seats by 2)
- 2007 Leicester City Council election
- 2011 Leicester City Council election
- 2015 Leicester City Council election (New ward boundaries)
- 2019 Leicester City Council election
- 2023 Leicester City Council election

== Mayoral elections ==
- Leicester mayoral election, 2011
- Leicester mayoral election, 2015
- Leicester mayoral election, 2019
- Leicester mayoral election, 2023

== Results maps ==
2003 results map

2007 results map

2011 results map

2015 results map

2019 results map

2023 results map

== By-election results ==
=== 1995–1999 ===
Abbey By-Election 10 October 1996
Party	Candidate	Votes	%	±%
Labour		1,608	69.3	
Conservative		461	19.9	
Liberal Democrats		140	6.0	
Socialist Labour		112	4.8	
Majority		1,147	49.4	
Turnout		2,321	37.1	
Labour hold		Swing		

Mowmacre By-Election 7 May 1998
Party	Candidate	Votes	%	±%
Liberal Democrats		744	51.8	+38.8
Labour		318	22.2	−38.2
Conservative		282	19.7	−1.2
Socialist Labour		91	6.3	+6.3
Majority		426	29.6	
Turnout		1,435		
Liberal Democrats gain from Labour		Swing		

Rushey Mead By-Election 7 May 1998
Party	Candidate	Votes	%	±%
Labour		1,205	56.0	−5.1
Conservative		513	23.8	+13.8
Liberal Democrats		334	15.5	+1.5
Socialist Labour		101	4.7	+4.7
Majority		692	32.2	
Turnout		2,153		
Labour hold		Swing		

Westcotes By-Election 7 May 1998
Party	Candidate	Votes	%	±%
Labour		839	46.7	−14.8
Liberal Democrats		376	20.9	+8.6
Conservative		374	20.8	+2.3
Green		125	7.0	−0.7
Socialist Labour		81	4.5	+4.5
Majority		463	25.8	
Turnout		1,795		
Labour hold		Swing		

=== 1999–2003 ===
Aylestone By-Election 15 February 2001
Party	Candidate	Votes	%	±%
Conservative	Jean Middleton	955	43.1	−5.2
Liberal Democrats	Alison Bannatyne	683	30.8	+18.5
Labour	Patrick Kitterick	525	23.7	−10.8
Green	Anthony Walker	51	2.3	−2.6
Majority		272	12.3	
Turnout		2,214	28.8	
Conservative hold		Swing		

Thurncourt By-Election 21 June 2001
Party	Candidate	Votes	%	±%
Conservative		1,060	43.7	−11.3
Labour		640	26.4	−9.5
Liberal Democrats		544	22.4	+13.3
BNP		115	4.7	+4.7
Independent		67	2.8	+2.8
Majority		420	17.3	
Turnout		2,426	32.4	
Conservative hold		Swing		

Eyres Monsell By-Election 2 May 2002
Party	Candidate	Votes	%	±%
Liberal Democrats	M Farmer	998	41.2	+18.4
Labour	J Blackmore	905	37.3	−9.3
Conservative	D Keeling	232	9.6	+0.0
BNP	E Scott	202	8.3	+8.3
Green	T O'Connel	66	2.7	+2.7
Socialist Labour	D Roberts	22	0.9	+0.9
Majority		93	3.9	
Turnout		2,425	39.6	
Liberal Democrats gain from Labour		Swing		

=== 2003–2007 ===
Westcotes By-Election 11 December 2003
Party	Candidate	Votes	%	±%
Liberal Democrats	A Tessier	742	47.4	+8.4
Labour	N Holden	543	34.7	−6.4
Conservative	R Taylor	113	7.2	−5.3
Socialist Labour	V Smalley	101	6.5	+6.5
BNP	K Yates	66	4.2	+4.2
Majority		199	12.7	
Turnout		1,565	25.2	
Liberal Democrats hold		Swing		

Aylestone By-Election 23 September 2004
Party	Candidate	Votes	%	±%
Conservative	Nigel Porter	938	45.8	−5.0
Liberal Democrats	R Webber-Jones	494	24.1	+2.1
Labour	R Craven-Griffiths	443	21.7	+2.3
Green	R Ball	171	8.4	+0.6
Majority		444	21.7	
Turnout		2,046	25.4	
Conservative hold		Swing		

Knighton By-Election 4 November 2004
Party	Candidate	Votes	%	±%
Conservative	R Grant	1,646	45.9	+14.4
Liberal Democrats	J Bhoot	1,089	30.4	−14.3
Labour	B Fairbairn	605	16.9	+1.7
Green	M Follet	247	6.9	−1.8
Majority		557	15.5	
Turnout		3,587	28.3	
Conservative gain from Liberal Democrats		Swing		

Belgrave By-Election 17 February 2005
Party	Candidate	Votes	%	±%
Labour	A Kavia	1,809	65.4	+16.7
Conservative	S Gajjar	459	16.6	+6.6
Liberal Democrats	P Jethwa	349	12.6	−2.7
Green	G Force	151	5.5	+1.7
Majority		1,350	48.8	
Turnout		2,768	36.6	
Labour hold		Swing		

Beaumont Leys By-Election 14 July 2005
Party	Candidate	Votes	%	±%
Labour	Violet Dempster	952	54.4	+5.9
Conservative	Martin Wright	342	19.5	−7.6
Liberal Democrats	John Taylor	295	16.8	−4.5
BNP	John Chapman	161	9.2	+9.2
Majority		610	34.9	
Turnout		1,750	18.2	
Labour hold		Swing		

Belgrave By-Election 14 July 2005
Party	Candidate	Votes	%	±%
Labour		1,751	66.1	+0.7
Liberal Democrats	Rukmani Patel	509	19.2	+6.6
Conservative		265	10.0	−6.6
Green		122	4.6	−0.9
Majority		1,242	46.9	+10.2
Turnout		2,647	34.3	−2.4
Labour hold		Swing		

=== 2007–2011 ===
Castle By-Election 10 September 2009
Party	Candidate	Votes	%	±%
Labour	Lynn Senior	611	31.7	+5.1
Green	Dave Dixey	519	26.9	−8.6
Conservative	Jacob Wilkinson	435	22.6	+7.2
Liberal Democrats	Joan Garrity	292	15.1	−3.1
UKIP	Zoey Lucas	41	2.1	−0.5
Liberal	Gareth Henry	31	1.6	−0.1
Majority		92	4.8	
Turnout		1,929	12.7	
Labour gain from Green		Swing	+6.8	

Eyres Monsell By-Election 6 May 2010
Party	Candidate	Votes	%	±%
Labour	Virginia Cleaver	1,446	35.3	−2.5
Conservative	Jon Humberstone	999	24.4	+2.8
Liberal Democrats	Scott Kennedy-Lount	908	22.2	+5.8
BNP	Adrian Waudby	745	18.2	−3.2
Majority		447	10.9	
Turnout		4,098		
Labour hold		Swing	-2.65	

=== 2011–2015 ===
Abbey By Election 9th May 2013
Party	Candidate	Votes	%	±%
Labour	Vijay Singh Riyait	1,190	47.9	+0.8
Conservative	Dipak Joshi	562	22.6	+9.0
Independent	Terry McGreal	352	14.1	n/a
Liberal Democrats	John Robert Taylor	212	8.5	+1.8
TUSC	Tessa Warrington	165	6.6	n/a
Majority		628	25.3	
Turnout		2,481	24.1	
Labour hold		Swing	-7.5	

=== 2015–2019 ===
Castle By-election 8 June 2017
Party	Candidate	Votes	%	±%
Labour	Danny Myers	4,272	64.6	+27.3
Conservative	Ali Douas	1,015	15.4	−2.1
Green	Oli Young-Jones	946	14.3	−13.5
Liberal Democrats	Lewis Hastie	379	5.7	−3.0
Majority		3,257	49.3	
Turnout		6,612		
Labour hold		Swing		

Eyres Monsell By-election 23 November 2017
Party	Candidate	Votes	%	±%
Labour	Elaine Pantling	556	53.15	
Liberal Democrats	Tony Faithfull-Wright	320	30.59	
Conservative	Christopher Michael Doyle	170	15.91	
Majority		236		
Turnout		1046	12.5	
Labour hold		Swing		

Belgrave By-election 6 December 2018
Party	Candidate	Votes	%	±%
Labour	Padmini Chamund	5,477	86.6	+17.0
Conservative	Khandubhai Patel	412	6.5	−11.9
Liberal Democrats	Hash Chandarana	238	3.8	+3.8
Green	Ursula Bilson	199	3.1	−2.6
Majority		5,065	80.1	
Turnout		6,326		
Labour hold		Swing		

=== 2019–2023 ===
North Evington By-election 6 May 2021
Party	Candidate	Votes	%	±%
Labour	Vandevi Pandya	3,306	47.2	−36.4
Conservative	Abdul Osman	2,565	36.6	+16.6
Green	Aasiya Bora	241	3.4	−3.5
Liberal Democrats	Asit Sodha	240	3.4	−2.4
TUSC	Kumaran Bose	117	1.7	+1.7
Reform	Raj Solanki	89	1.3	+1.3
For Britain	David Haslett	69	1.0	+1.0
Independent	Charnjit Singh Sagoo	61	0.9	+0.9
Communist	Andrea Burford	33	0.5	+0.5
Majority		741	10.6	
Turnout		7,004		
Labour hold		Swing		

Humberstone and Hamilton By-election 22 July 2021
Party	Candidate	Votes	%	±%
Conservative	Daniel Crewe	1,062	44.7	+18.5
Labour	Abdul Jalil	790	33.2	−15.5
Liberal Democrats	Bicram Athwal	262	11.0	+1.2
Green	Pam Bellinger	190	8.0	−7.1
Reform	Raj Solanki	37	1.6	+1.6
For Britain	David Haslett	37	1.6	+1.6
Majority		272	11.5	
Turnout		2,378		
Conservative gain from Labour		Swing		

Evington By-election 3 February 2022
Party	Candidate	Votes	%	±%
Labour	Shahid Ullah Khan	1,557	38.8	−20.8
Conservative	Jenny Joannuo	1,382	34.4	+11.9
Liberal Democrats	Zuffar Haq	830	20.7	+12.2
Green	Ursula Bilson	200	5.0	−7.6
For Britain	David George	45	1.1	+1.1
Majority		175	4.4	
Turnout		4,014		
Labour hold		Swing		

North Evington By-election 13 October 2022
Party	Candidate	Votes	%	±%
Conservative	Sanjay Modhwadia	3,441	49.6	+32.7
Green	Aasiya Bora	1,790	25.8	+20.0
Labour	Rajul Tejura	1,563	22.5	−49.8
Liberal Democrats	Jitesh Dave	100	1.4	−3.5
TUSC	Tessa Warrington	45	0.6	+0.6
Majority		1,651	23.8	
Turnout		6,939		
Conservative gain from Labour		Swing		

=== 2023–2027 ===
Stoneygate By-election 19 February 2026
Party	Candidate	Votes	%	±%
Green	Aasiya Bora	1,195	30.4	
Labour	Adam Sabat	1,089	27.7	
One Leicester	Alef Uddin	638	16.2	
Independent	Faisal Noor	453	11.5	
Conservative	Rashmikant Joshi	327	8.3	
Reform	Michael Dabrowski	106	2.7	
Liberal Democrats	Asit Sodha	62	1.6	
Independent	Michael Barker	61	1.6	
Majority		106	2.7	
Turnout		3,931		
Green gain from Labour		Swing		
