= Roger Blackmore =

British politician (1941–2024)

Lord Mayor of Leicester
- In office May 2009 – May 2010
- Preceded by: Manjula Sood
- Succeeded by: Colin Hall

Leader of Leicester City Council
- In office 22 May 2003 – 17 May 2007
- Preceded by: Ross Willmott
- Succeeded by: Ross Willmott

Councillor on Leicester City Council
- In office May 1995 – May 2011

Personal details
- Born: 30 December 1941
- Died: 6 September 2024 (aged 82)
- Party: Liberal Democrats
- Spouse: Hilary Blackmore
- Children: 3

Roger Brian Blackmore (30 December 1941 – 6 September 2024) was a Liberal Democrat politician. He was leader of Leicester City Council from 2003 to 2004 and 2005 to 2007 and Lord Mayor of Leicester from 2009 to 2010.

== Education ==
He was educated at Abingdon School from September 1954 until December 1956 and then studied Social Sciences at the University of Leicester.

== Career ==
He stayed in Leicester after graduating in 1963 to work at the Imperial Typewriter Company. He became a lecturer at Charles Keene College in 1968.

He was elected to Leicestershire County Council for the Western Park division in 1993, and then to Leicester City Council for the same ward in 1995. In 1997 Leicester City Council became a unitary authority. In 2000 he became leader of the Liberal Democrat group on the city council. After the 2003 local election, the Liberal Democrats became the largest party on the council, and Blackmore became leader in May 2003, leading a Liberal Democrat/Conservative coalition. In November 2004, Labour's Ross Willmott took over as leader in a minority Labour administration, but Blackmore returned as leader in May 2005 until the 2007 Leicester City Council election. Blackmore was lord mayor of Leicester for 2009 to 2010. He stood down from the council in 2011.

Blackmore was a Parliamentary candidate for the Liberal Party on six occasions during the 1970s and 1980s. He stood in Gainsborough (1970, February 1974, October 1974 and 1979), North Devon (1983) and Wansdyke (1987).

== Personal life ==
Roger Blackmore was married to Hilary and had three children Heather, Quentin and Julian. He died on 6 September 2024.

== See also ==
- List of Old Abingdonians
