= 2015 Leicester City Council election =

← 2011	7 May 2015	2019 →

All 54 seats to Leicester City Council 28 seats needed for a majority
	First party	Second party
Party	Labour	Conservative
Seats won	52	1
Seat change	0	0
	Third party	Fourth party
Party	Liberal Democrats	UKIP
Seats won	1	0
Seat change	0
- Winner of each seat at the 2015 Leicester City Council election
Council control before election
Labour
Council control
Labour

The 2015 Leicester City Council election took place on 7 May 2015 to elect members of Leicester City Council in England. This was on the same day as other local elections, the 2015 general election and the election for the directly elected Mayor of Leicester.

== Election result ==
The 54 councillors are elected from 27 wards, each electing either 2 or 3 councillors. The results of the election were that 52 Labour councillors were elected, with 1 Conservative and 1 Liberal Democrat. This is unchanged from the 2011 local election.

Leicester City Council local election result 2015
Party	Seats	Gains	Losses	Net gain/loss	Seats %	Votes %	Votes	+/−
Labour	52	0	0	0	96.0	55.0	163,374	
Conservative	1	0	0	0	2.0	17.6	52,269	
Liberal Democrats	1	0	0	0	2.0	6.5	19,407	
UKIP	0	0	0	0	0.0	12.0	35,615	
Green	0	0	0	0	0.0	7.1	21,039	
Independent	0	0	0	0	0.0	1.7	5,002	
TUSC	0	0	0	0	0.0	0.2	476	
English Democrat	0	0	0	0	0.0	0.0	50	

== Ward results ==
=== Abbey (3) ===
Abbey
Party	Candidate	Votes	%	±%
Labour	Annette Dawn Byrne	2,881		
Labour	Harshad Dahyabhai Bhavsar	2,360		
Labour	Vijay Singh Riyait	2,189		
UKIP	Paul Edwards	1,369		
Conservative	Peter John Shandley	1,352		
Conservative	Hiran Patel	1,289		
UKIP	Peter Bryan Stone	1,116		
UKIP	Gregg Young	1000		
Conservative	Khandubhai Patel	977		
Green	Jessie Cooke	618		
Green	Alan John Stocker	421		
Liberal Democrats	Paul Edwin Smith	392		
Liberal Democrats	John Robert Taylor	375		
TUSC	Tessa Alison Warrington	183		
Independence from Europe	Ismail Mohammed Ali Patel	78		
Majority				
Turnout		16600	53.0	
Labour hold		Swing		

=== Aylestone (2) ===
Aylestone
Party	Candidate	Votes	%	±%
Labour	Adam Michael Drewitt Clarke	1,516		
Liberal Democrats	Nigel Carl Porter	1,177		
Conservative	Paul David Bremner	1095		
Labour	Tara Jane Harris	1065		
Conservative	Christina Margaret Davison	998		
Liberal Democrats	Andrea Michelle Gee	907		
UKIP	Dutch Veldhuizen	709		
Green	Chris Hughes	703		
UKIP	Anthony Yates	692		
Green	Tim Pearce	649		
Independent	Philip Stuart Middleton	37		
Majority				
Turnout		9548	64.7	
Labour hold		Swing		
Liberal Democrats hold		Swing		

=== Beaumont Leys (3) ===
Beaumont Leys
Party	Candidate	Votes	%	±%
Labour	Paul Thomas Westley	2,642		
Labour	Sue Waddington	2,444		
Labour	Hemant Rae Bhatia	2,355		
Conservative	Bhavnisha Champaneri	1389		
UKIP	Bernard Garry Fox	1159		
Conservative	Dinesh Pathak	1042		
Conservative	Aarti Solanki	989		
UKIP	Andy Greaves	987		
UKIP	Tracey Ann Greaves	931		
Liberal Democrats	Adrian Charles Barnes	808		
Green	Peter Richard Hague	644		
LICC	Steve Score	219		
Majority				
Turnout		15609	51.9	
Labour hold		Swing		

=== Belgrave (3) ===
Belgrave
Party	Candidate	Votes	%	±%
Labour	Mansukhlal Dharamshi Chohan	5,705		
Labour	Manjula Sood	5,593		
Labour	John William Thomas	4,653		
Conservative	Assoc Faquir	1509		
Conservative	Sathish Maroju	1485		
Conservative	Manish Naresh Teli	1273		
Green	Dinah Gilian Freer	466		
UKIP	Darren Millward	318		
UKIP	Donna Millward	270		
UKIP	Scott Prendergast	263		
LICC	Alexander Morgan	199		
Majority				
Turnout		21734	67.7	
Labour hold		Swing		

=== Braunstone Park and Rowley Fields (3) ===
Braunstone Park & Rowley Fields
Party	Candidate	Votes	%	±%
Labour	Steve Corrall	2,358		
Labour	Elaine Christina Halford	2,280		
Labour	Kulwinder Singh Johal	1,836		
UKIP	Sukiy Singh	1628		
UKIP	Karen June Green	1514		
UKIP	Brian Kirkup	1270		
Liberal Democrats	Ian Carmichael Bradwell	992		
Green	Zina Zelter	949		
LICC	Wayne Naylor	461		
LICC	Jumi Hollist	299		
Majority				
Turnout		13587	47.8	
Labour hold		Swing		

=== Castle (3) ===
Castle
Party	Candidate	Votes	%	±%
Labour	Patrick Joseph Kitterick	2,388		
Labour	Lynn Senior	2,116		
Labour	Deborah Anne Sangster	1,997		
Green	Mags Lewis	1777		
Green	Hannah Rose Wakley	1418		
Green	Chris Williams	1196		
Conservative	Emily Meriel Elizabeth Davison	1117		
Conservative	Leon Hadji-Nikolaou	982		
Conservative	Jamie Williams	851		
Liberal Democrats	Alan Francis Fox	557		
Liberal Democrats	Thomas Neville March Hunnings	381		
UKIP	Zoey Debra Lucas	310		
UKIP	Tina Marie Johnson	304		
Liberal Democrats	Mohan Raghav	280		
LICC	Robert William Fraser Durdin	252		
UKIP	Mandy Wright	232		
Majority				
Turnout		16158	58.1	
Labour hold		Swing		

=== Evington (3) ===
Evington
Party	Candidate	Votes	%	±%
Labour	Deepak Bajaj	3,990		
Labour	Sue Hunter	3,827		
Labour	Ratilal Bhagwan Govind	3,327		
Conservative	Pratap Jethwa	1874		
Conservative	Sajan Raja Odedra	1737		
Conservative	Vivek Bhima Khistariya	1564		
UKIP	Colin William Brown	690		
Green	Ursula Elisabeth Bilson	660		
UKIP	Chris Lucas	633		
UKIP	Simon Stone	499		
Green	Neil Ben Foley	388		
LICC	Anthony Robert Blower	267		
Majority				
Turnout		19456	63.3	
Labour hold		Swing		

=== Eyres Monsell (2) ===
Eyres Monsell
Party	Candidate	Votes	%	±%
Labour	Virginia Cleaver	1,439		
Labour	Rory Palmer	1,229		
UKIP	Paul Mark Aldwinckle	874		
UKIP	Daz Lee	778		
Conservative	Aileen Marlow	613		
Conservative	Daniel Neal Quelch	376		
Liberal Democrats	Christopher Everitt Garner	253		
Green	Christopher John Davies	203		
Liberal Democrats	Scott Kennedy-Lount	179		
Majority				
Turnout		5944	46.2	
Labour hold		Swing		

=== Fosse (2) ===
Fosse
Party	Candidate	Votes	%	±%
Labour	Dawn Victoria Alfonso	1,756		
Labour	Ted Cassidy	1,684		
UKIP	Nicholas Stefen Pridden	886		
UKIP	Stuart Ian Eric Young	869		
Green	Geoff Forse	856		
Green	Benjamin Livingstone	650		
LICC	Brian Rodney Scott	184		
Majority				
Turnout			49.2	
Labour hold		Swing		

=== Humberstone and Hamilton (3) ===
Humberstone & Hamilton
Party	Candidate	Votes	%	±%
Labour	Rashmi Joshi	3,035		
Labour	Gurinder Singh Sandhu	2,759		
Labour	Vi Dempster	2,620		
Conservative	Michael Halford	1983		
Conservative	Dhiren Morjaria	1813		
Conservative	Sudhir Odedra	1624		
UKIP	Victoria Jayne Connor	1021		
UKIP	Stephen Michael Ingall	921		
UKIP	Samantha Clare Willbond	898		
Green	David William Dixey	676		
LICC	Barbie Potter	368		
LICC	Andy Coles	320		
Independent	Kerrie Carnall	205		
Majority				
Turnout			59	
Labour hold		Swing		

=== Knighton (3) ===
Knighton
Party	Candidate	Votes	%	±%
Labour	Lynn Valerie Moore	3,405		
Labour	Inderjit Singh Gugnani	3,052		
Conservative	Ross Ian Grant	3,007		
Labour	Geoff Whittle	2616		
Conservative	Caroline Louise Scuplak	2048		
Conservative	Ty Watson	1887		
Green	Sylvia Ann Reid	1273		
Liberal Democrats	Parmjit Singh Gill	1271		
Liberal Democrats	Joan Garrity	1125		
Liberal Democrats	Juliet Kechouane Gill	1010		
UKIP	Sean Richardson	600		
UKIP	Jitesh Dave	503		
UKIP	Rahaul Paul Sharma	386		
LICC	Kerry Siabhan Brier	253		
Majority				
Turnout			68.5	
Labour hold		Swing		
Conservative hold		Swing		

=== North Evington (3) ===
North Evington
Party	Candidate	Votes	%	±%
Labour	Abdul Razak Osman	5,800		
Labour	Luis Jose Jeronimo Bento Da Fonseca	4,942		
Labour	Jean Khote	4,834		
Conservative	Khemraj Gohel	1414		
Conservative	Mamta Natuarlal	1301		
Conservative	Mayur Lakhubhai Sisodia	1199		
Green	Woody Kitson	419		
UKIP	Rambhi Odedra	327		
LICC	Thomas Patrick Barker	291		
UKIP	Shilpa Odedra	291		
UKIP	Ravinder Kathleen Ivy Taylor	280		
Majority				
Turnout			64.2	
Labour hold		Swing		

=== Rushey Mead (3) ===
Rushey Mead
Party	Candidate	Votes	%	±%
Labour	Rita Patel	4,597		
Labour	Piara Singh Clair	4,584		
Labour	Ross Willmott	4,390		
Conservative	Hemubhai Chandarana	1797		
Conservative	Rashmi Vyas	1702		
Conservative	Sarban Singh	1389		
Liberal Democrats	Hash Chandarana	586		
Green	Nimit Jethwa	513		
UKIP	Keith Agius	472		
UKIP	Adam Barker	399		
UKIP	Kyle Perkins	353		
Liberal Democrats	Nitesh Dave	327		
Liberal Democrats	Jaswinder Kaur	305		
LICC	Leila Khamis	117		
Majority				
Turnout			66.4	
Labour hold		Swing		

=== Saffron (2) ===
Saffron
Party	Candidate	Votes	%	±%
Labour	Elly Cutkelvin	1,573		
Labour	Bill Shelton	1,270		
UKIP	Phil Johnson	580		
Green	Tim Grayson	532		
Conservative	Andy Bayford	530		
UKIP	Leee Parker	397		
Conservative	John Orme	307		
Liberal Democrats	Anthony Faithfull-Wright	207		
LICC	Peter Bisson	177		
Liberal Democrats	Simon Herbert	163		
Majority				
Turnout			47	
Labour hold		Swing		

=== Spinney Hills (2) ===
Spinney Hills
Party	Candidate	Votes	%	±%
Labour	Shofiqul Islam Chowdhury	4,277		
Labour	Ghulam Mustafa Malik	3,727		
Liberal Democrats	Mahomed Siddik Giga	822		
Liberal Democrats	Yakub Mohmed Umar	666		
Green	Sally Lucinda Singer-Fraser	275		
UKIP	Barbara Joan Moxey	209		
UKIP	Anthony Charles Wright	189		
LICC	Andrew John Walton	155		
Majority				
Turnout			66.5	
Labour hold		Swing		

=== Stoneygate (3) ===
Stoneygate
Party	Candidate	Votes	%	±%
Labour	Kirk Master	4,871		
Labour	Mohammed Aminur Thalukdar	4,779		
Labour	Lucy Chaplin	4,334		
Liberal Democrats	Afiea Akhtar	1272		
Conservative	John Michael Grant	1057		
Conservative	Rebecca Helen Mary Lee	838		
Green	Bob Ball	799		
Green	Simon Paul Bates	680		
Liberal Democrats	Ranjit Singh Flora	545		
Green	Michael Jeffrey Sackin	476		
Liberal Democrats	Mukesh Lalitchandra Vaidya	359		
UKIP	Trevor Green	222		
UKIP	Joanne Hassell	218		
LICC	Lauren Grace Kelb-Lancaster	196		
UKIP	Bejai Jay	193		
Majority				
Turnout			62.7	
Labour hold		Swing		

=== Thurncourt (2) ===
Thurncourt
Party	Candidate	Votes	%	±%
Labour	Teresa Louise Aldred	1,816		
Labour	Paul Darren Newcombe	1,435		
Conservative	Jack Robert Hickey	1345		
Conservative	Joseph Anthony Peverill	973		
UKIP	Timmy Tony Jacques	744		
UKIP	Adam James O'beirne	645		
Green	Murray Roy Frankland	293		
Green	Anna Broszkiewicz	235		
TUSC	Sally Skyrme	184		
English Democrat	David John Haslett	50		
Majority				
Turnout			59.4	
Labour hold		Swing		

=== Troon (2) ===
Troon
Party	Candidate	Votes	%	±%
Labour	Baljit Singh	2,476		
Labour	Diane Linda Cank	1,984		
Conservative	Hemendra Champaklal Modi	1128		
Conservative	Rupa Chatrabhuj Soni	824		
UKIP	Suleman Rahemtulla	528		
UKIP	Rambhaben Dave	498		
Green	Andrew James Reeves	362		
LICC	Darren Baxter	239		
Majority				
Turnout			58.7	
Labour hold		Swing		

=== Westcotes (2) ===
Westcotes
Party	Candidate	Votes	%	±%
Labour	Andy Connelly	1,859		
Labour	Sarah Christine Russell	1,615		
Green	Ian James Smalley	725		
Conservative	Kirti Doshi	685		
Green	Val Smalley	621		
Conservative	Jitu Gosai	522		
Liberal Democrats	Eduardas Gaulia	353		
UKIP	Carol Young	328		
UKIP	Antony Edmett	313		
Liberal Democrats	Gurjit Singh Gill	256		
TUSC	Damon Peter Gibbons	109		
LICC	Samantha Clare Kirk	99		
Majority				
Turnout			50.3	
Labour hold		Swing		

=== Western (3) ===
Western
Party	Candidate	Votes	%	±%
Labour	Susan Barton	2,909		
Labour	Orlanzo George Cole	2,513		
Labour	Malcolm William Unsworth	1,807		
UKIP	Stewart Keith Wittering	1757		
UKIP	Reginald Sidney Moxey	1567		
Liberal Democrats	Peter Coley	1479		
UKIP	Stephanie Murphy	1475		
Liberal Democrats	Nicola Jane Henfrey	1083		
Green	Mel Gould	882		
Liberal Democrats	Gary Glendon Hunt	841		
Green	Paul William Eccleshare	680		
LICC	Caroline Louisa Vincent	323		
Majority				
Turnout			51.7	
Labour hold		Swing		

=== Wycliffe (2) ===
Wycliffe
Party	Candidate	Votes	%	±%
Labour	Hanif Aqbany	5,048		
Labour	Mohammed Dawood	4,817		
Conservative	Abdikayf Bashir Farah	384		
LICC	Mohamed Shiine	263		
Liberal Democrats	Mohamed Ahmed	249		
Liberal Democrats	Mohamed Kassim Mohamed	187		
Majority				
Turnout			69.2	
Labour hold		Swing		
