= 2023 Leicester City Council election =

- 4 May 2023

All 54 seats to Leicester City Council 28 seats needed for a majority
- Turnout: 37.0%
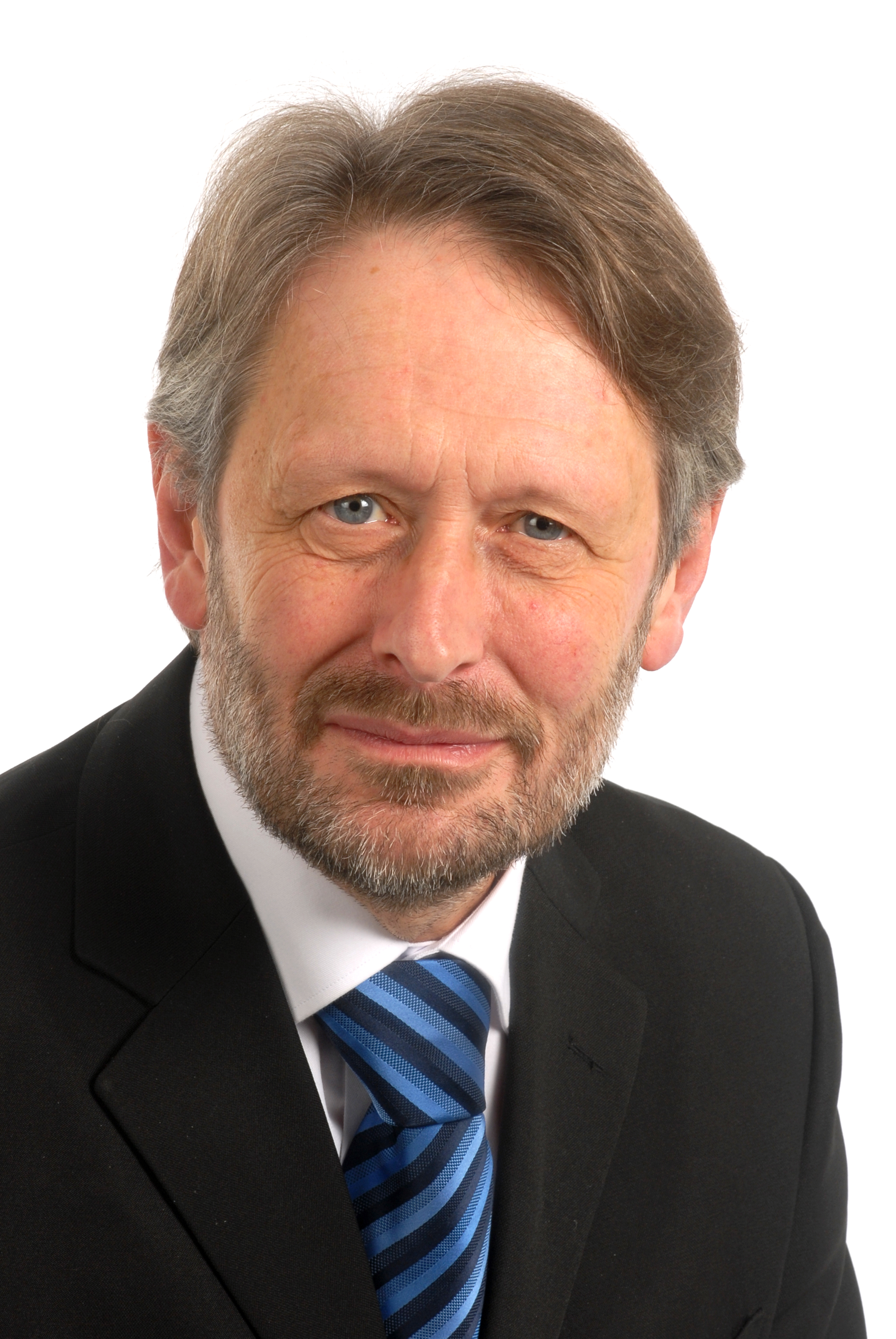

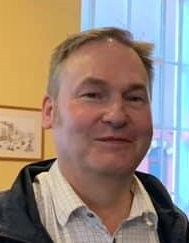

	First party	Second party	Third party
Leader	Peter Soulsby	Sanjay Modhwadia	Nigel Porter
Party	Labour	Conservative	Liberal Democrats
Leader's seat	Mayoralty	North Evington	Aylestone
Last election	56.9%, 53 seats	17.5%, 0 seats	8.7%, 1 seat
Seats before	36	5	1
Seats won	31	17	3
Seat change	▼22	▲17	▲2
Popular vote	89,425	76,867	21,399
Percentage	40.4%	34.8%	9.7%
Swing	▼16.5%	▲17.3%	▲1.0%
	Fourth party	Fifth party
Leader	Patrick Kitterick
Party	Green	Independent
Leader's seat	Castle
Last election	11.6%, 0 seats	0.6%, 0 seats
Seats before	1	11
Seats won	3	0
Seat change	▲3	-
Popular vote	13,830	17,757
Percentage	6.3%	8.0%
Swing	▼5.3%	▲7.4%
- Winner of each seat at the 2023 Leicester City Council election
Mayor before election
Peter Soulsby
Labour
Mayor after election
Peter Soulsby
Labour

The 2023 Leicester City Council election took place on 4 May 2023 to elect all 54 members of Leicester City Council in England. This was on the same day as other local elections, and the election for the directly elected Mayor of Leicester.

Labour's Peter Soulsby was re-elected as mayor and the party retained its majority on the council, but with a significant loss of 22 seats compared to its position at the previous election in 2019. The Conservatives gained 17 extra seats against the national trend. The Green Party and Liberal Democrats also made gains, with each being represented by three seats.

== Background ==
=== 2019 elections ===
Labour retained control of Leicester City Council in the 2019 local elections, winning fifty-three councillors on an increased share of the vote. The Liberal Democrats were runners-up, becoming the only opposition party on the council after the wipe-out of the Conservatives. A month later, Labour came top of the polls in the European Parliament election in the city – Leicester having the second-highest Labour vote share in the country, behind only the London Borough of Newham. The Brexit Party narrowly pipped the Liberal Democrats into second place.

In the 2019 general election, Labour consolidated its support in the city by winning all three constituencies with healthy majorities, despite a disappointing general election campaign elsewhere. However, the candidate selection of Claudia Webbe in Leicester East, from a shortlist of one, caused controversy amongst local Labour Party members who were angry at being denied an option of a candidate from the South Asian community, at Webbe's views on the Kashmir conflict, and at the fact that she was a serving councillor in the London Borough of Islington. Long-serving councillor John Thomas resigned from the party, citing the selection of Webbe and the leadership of Jeremy Corbyn, and the Conservatives achieved a swing of 15% in the constituency.

=== Controversies and by-elections ===
City Mayor Peter Soulsby faced calls to resign by Liberal Democrat leader Nigel Porter during the COVID-19 pandemic after it emerged Soulsby had been breaking lockdown rules to visit his lover. This was in the background of Leicester's COVID cases being amongst the highest in the United Kingdom, with the city being kept in stricter restrictions than the rest of the country for much of the pandemic.

Soulsby was further criticised after Assistant Mayor Mustafa Malik was suspended by the Labour Party after sharing anti-semitic posts on social media but was allowed to retain the Labour whip in the City Council. Councillor Jacky Nangreave was also suspended, after claiming that Keir Starmer was an "agent of Israel", though was later reinstated. Additionally, Labour Councillor for Western Ward, Lindsay Broadwell, resigned the Labour whip and sat as an independent citing the toxic atmosphere of the Labour group and dissatisfaction with the party nationally.

Amidst the controversies, the Labour grip on the city began to wane. In the 2021 North Evington By-election, they narrowly held onto a previously safe ward after a 26.5% swing to the Conservatives. A few months later, the Conservatives gained their first representative on the council since the 2019 elections after winning the Humberstone and Hamilton by-election. Winning Conservative candidate Daniel Crewe was soon, in September 2022, joined by Labour defector Deepak Bajaj. However, Crewe later resigned his membership of the Conservative Party following the 2022 mini-budget.

Despite this, Labour continued to do poorly in local by-elections. Labour narrowly held on in a three-way fight at the Evington by-election, clinging on with a twenty-one per cent reduction in the vote share after both the Conservatives and the Liberal Democrats gained heavily. Another three-way election, the 2022 North Evington by-election, followed, with Labour being relegated to third in a ward that in 2019 it had won with 66.8% of the vote. Sanjay Modhwadia won for the Conservatives, with the Greens some distance behind in second place. There was a further setback when former Council Leader Ross Willmott was suspended by the national Labour Party for membership of an organisation that the party had proscribed.

=== Deselections and defections ===
In spite of these difficulties, Sir Peter Soulsby was re-confirmed as the Labour candidate for the 2023 elections – though the Leicester Mercury noted mixed feelings amongst its readers at this announcement.

However, following the electoral defeats, the Labour Party at national level set up a 'Campaigns Improvement Board' to oversee the local party. The Labour Party National Executive Committee's (NEC) claims that the local Labour Party was beset with "in-fighting, division and no clear vision" was quickly seized upon by political opponents. As a result of the NEC supervision, nineteen local Labour councillors were deselected. The Labour Party was criticised for a disproportionate number of Asian councillors being deselected, with 58% of BAME councillors not re-selected versus just 18% of white councillors while Councillor Stephen Gee quit the party following the process, stating that "Labour no longer supports people with disabilities". After being deselected, many Labour councillors vowed to fight as independents. Additionally, three councillors – Rashmikant Joshi, Paul Westley and Hemant Rae Bhatia – defected to the Conservatives, bringing the total number of Conservative members of the council to five.

To compound Labour's problems, a vote on whether to retain the Mayoral system saw open warfare breakout within the Labour group. The vote, in which City councillors voted to retain the Mayoral system, saw fourteen Labour councillors rebel against the whip amid accusations of bullying and intimidation to force them to vote to retain the mayor. Ultimately, four Labour councillors had the whip suspended while Councillor Patrick Kitterick defected to the Green Party, claiming that "the Labour Party has changed for the worse" and that "“It seems the party is going down a route where you either unquestioningly agree with the city mayor or you leave. So I'm leaving." His defection gave the Green Party its first seat on the City Council since losing all its seats in the 2015 elections.

=== Council composition ===
Party	2019 Election	Before 2023 Election
Labour	53	36
Conservative	0	5
Liberal Democrats	1	1
Green	0	1
Independent	0	11

== Campaign ==
Labour launched its campaign, aiming to make Leicester a 'fairer, happier and safer city' by providing extra support for families struggling with the cost-of-living crisis and to invest in more CCTV and street lights. The party also says it seeks to do more to tackle climate change. Labour Mayor Peter Soulsby claimed after the campaign that religion had been 'weaponised' during the election.

The Conservative campaign was focussed on preventing new housing developments, pledging a nature reserve to prevent housing on the city's fringes. The party also pledges to provide free bus travel for schoolchildren and to not raise council tax above inflation.

The Liberal Democrats are campaigning on building 3,000 new affordable homes and offering a referendum on the mayoral system – a position they also put forward at the 2019 elections.

The Green Party announced it was targeting three wards in the election: Castle, where it held seats between 2011 and 2015; Saffron; and North Evington. The party is campaigning to scrap the Mayoral system, pledging a referendum within a year of taking office.

== Candidates ==
=== Councillors not standing for re-election ===
Councillor	Ward	Party	Notes
Deborah Sangster	Castle	Labour	Deselected
Shahid Khan	Evington	Labour	Deselected
Daniel Crewe	Humberstone and Hamilton	Independent	Elected as a Conservative councillor
Luis Fonseca	North Evington	Labour	Deselected
Bill Shelton	Saffron	Labour	
Stephan Gee	Thurncourt	Independent	Elected as a Labour councillor
Lindsay Broadwell	Western	Independent	Elected as a Labour councillor

=== Councillors standing under a different political affiliation ===
Councillor	2019 party	2019 ward	2023 party	2023 ward
Paul Westley	Labour	Beaumont Leys	Conservative	Beaumont Leys
Hemant Rae Bhatia	Labour	Beaumont Leys	Conservative	Beaumont Leys
Deepak Bajaj	Labour	Evington	Conservative	Evington
Ruma Ali	Labour	Humberstone and Hamilton	TUSC	Evington
Rashmikant Joshi	Labour	North Evington	Conservative	Evington
Rita Patel	Labour	Rushey Mead	Independent	Rushey Mead
Ross Willmott	Labour	Rushey Mead	Independent	Rushey Mead
Kirk Masters	Labour	Stoneygate	Independent	Stoneygate
Sharmen Rahman	Labour	Stoneygate	Independent	Stoneygate
Aminur Thalukdar	Labour	Stoneygate	Independent	Stoneygate
Jacky Nangreave	Labour	Westcotes	Independent	Westcotes
Gary O’Donnell	Labour	Western	Independent	Western
Padmini Chamund	Labour	Belgrave	Independent	Belgrave
Nita Solanki	Labour	Belgrave	Independent	Belgrave
Mahendra Valand	Labour	Belgrave	Independent	Belgrave
Patrick Kitterick	Labour	Castle	Green	Castle

=== Councillors standing in a different ward ===
Councillor	2019 party	2019 ward	2023 party	2023 ward
Manjit Kaur Saini	Labour	Abbey	Labour	Humberstone and Hamilton
Adam Clarke	Labour	Aylestone	Labour	Westcotes
Vi Dempster	Labour	Beaumont Leys	Labour	Western
Ted Cassidy	Labour	Fosse	Labour	Saffron
Ashiedu Joel	Labour	Troon	Labour	Humberstone and Hamilton
Ruma Ali	Labour	Humberstone and Hamilton	TUSC	Evington
Rashmikant Joshi	Labour	North Evington	Conservative	Evington

== Summary ==
=== Election results ===
2023 Leicester City Council election
Party	Candidates	Seats	Gains	Losses	Net gain/loss	Seats %	Votes %	Votes	+/−
Labour	54	31	0	22	▼22	57.4	40.4	89,425	–24.3
Conservative	52	17	17	0	▲17	31.5	34.8	76,867	+15.6
Liberal Democrats	42	3	2	0	▲2	5.6	9.7	21,399	+4.2
Green	26	3	3	0	▲3	5.6	6.3	13,830	+0.1
Independent	27	0	0	0	-	0.0	8.0	17,757	+7.5
TUSC	9	0	0	0	-	0.0	0.7	1,540	N/A
ADF	1	0	0	0	-	0.0	0.1	138	N/A
Reform	1	0	0	0	-	0.0	0.0	80	N/A
Communist	1	0	0	0	-	0.0	0.0	42	N/A
British Democrats	1	0	0	0	-	0.0	0.0	34	N/A

== Ward results ==
=== Abbey ===
Abbey (3 seats)
Party	Candidate	Votes	%	±%
Conservative	Charleigh Barnes	1,829	39.8	
Conservative	Nags Agath	1,793	39.0	
Labour	Annette Byrne	1,776	38.7	
Conservative	Kuljit Singh	1,748	38.1	
Labour	Vijay Riyait	1,652	36.0	
Labour	Emma Saunders-Sinclair	1,536	33.4	
Green	Jim McCallum	583	12.7	
Independent	Hannel Chohan	482	10.5	
Liberal Democrats	Yevgeny Salisbury	391	8.5	
Turnout		4,592	29.68	
Rejected ballots		58	1.3	
Registered electors		15,473		
Conservative gain from Labour				
Conservative gain from Labour				
Labour hold				

=== Aylestone ===
Aylestone (2 seats)
Party	Candidate	Votes	%	±%
Liberal Democrats	Nigel Porter	1,096	42.2	
Liberal Democrats	Scott Kennedy-Lount	927	35.7	
Labour	Rose Griffiths	839	32.3	
Labour	Rebecca Pawley	605	23.3	
Conservative	Deloris Philip	360	13.9	
Conservative	Inder Singh	301	11.6	
Green	Bob Ball	300	11.5	
TUSC	Steve Score	157	6.0	
Independent	George Brown	68	2.6	
Turnout		2,599	29.80	
Rejected ballots		14	0.5	
Registered electors		8,722		
Liberal Democrats hold				
Liberal Democrats gain from Labour				

=== Belgrave ===
Belgrave (3 seats)
Party	Candidate	Votes	%	±%
Conservative	Yogesh Chauhan	4,424	54.6	
Conservative	Shital Adatia	4,409	54.4	
Conservative	Jaiantilal Gopal	4,335	53.5	
Labour	Gurinder Athwal	1,818	22.4	
Labour	Kirit Mistry	1,759	21.7	
Labour	Hersh Thaker	1,636	20.2	
Independent	Nita Solanki	1,356	16.7	
Independent	Padmini Chamund	1,296	16.0	
Independent	Mahendra Valand	1,103	13.6	
Green	Darren Howes	341	4.2	
Liberal Democrats	Pravin Raja	239	3.0	
TUSC	David Rollins	183	2.3	
Turnout		8,098	56.39	
Rejected ballots		99	1.2	
Registered electors		14,360		
Conservative gain from Labour				
Conservative gain from Labour				
Conservative gain from Labour				

=== Evington ===
Evington (3 seats)
Party	Candidate	Votes	%	±%
Liberal Democrats	Zuffar Haq	1,841	33.6	
Conservative	Deepak Bajaj	1,794	32.7	
Conservative	Jenny Joannou	1,657	30.2	
Labour	Naj Hassan	1,603	29.2	
Conservative	Rashmikant Joshi	1,590	29.0	
Liberal Democrats	Farida Patel	1,490	27.2	
Labour	Sue Hunter	1,367	24.9	
Labour	Jatinder Matharu	1,292	23.6	
Liberal Democrats	Nitesh Dave	1,200	21.9	
Independent	Baljit Singh	377	6.9	
Green	Jill Fisher	349	6.4	
TUSC	Ruma Ali	234	4.3	
Turnout		5,483	42.49	
Rejected ballots		58	1.1	
Registered electors		12,905		
Liberal Democrats gain from Labour				
Conservative gain from Labour				
Conservative gain from Labour				

=== Humberstone and Hamilton ===
Humberstone and Hamilton (3 seats)
Party	Candidate	Votes	%	±%
Labour	Stephen Bonham	1,673	38.9	
Labour	Manjit Kaur Saini	1,642	38.2	
Labour	Ashiedu Joel	1,531	35.6	
Conservative	Ranjit Sonigra	1,342	31.2	
Conservative	Sameer Thanki	1,286	29.9	
Conservative	Romail Gulzar	1,275	29.6	
Green	Pam Bellinger	492	11.4	
Independent	Solly Lunat	478	11.1	
Liberal Democrats	Bicram Athwal	416	9.7	
Independent	Vinodrai Ghadiali	345	8.0	
Liberal Democrats	Thomas Hunnings	337	7.8	
Liberal Democrats	Karan Vyas	299	6.9	
TUSC	Barbara Potter	196	4.6	
Independent	Ravi Kanta Powar	196	4.6	
Turnout		4,304	29.74	
Rejected ballots		31	0.7	
Registered electors		14,471		
Labour hold				
Labour hold				
Labour hold				

=== North Evington ===
North Evington (3 seats)
Party	Candidate	Votes	%	±%
Conservative	Dilip Joshi	3,943	45.9	
Conservative	Sanjay Modhwadia	3,910	45.5	
Conservative	Ravi Mahesh	3,863	45.0	
Labour	Mohammed Taher	3,154	36.7	
Labour	Zoya Shaikh	3,136	36.5	
Labour	Ajay Aggarwal	2,776	32.3	
Liberal Democrats	Nilesh Bica	732	8.5	
Liberal Democrats	Hitesh Bhutiya	728	8.5	
Liberal Democrats	Hakan Akgoz	636	7.4	
Green	Hannah Wakley	385	4.5	
Green	Martin Gage	302	3.5	
Green	Brendan Keegan	296	3.4	
Reform	Raj Solanki	80	0.9	
Turnout		8,592	54.59	
Rejected ballots		124	1.4	
Registered electors		15,740		
Conservative gain from Labour				
Conservative gain from Labour				
Conservative gain from Labour				

=== Rushey Mead ===
Rushey Mead (3 seats)
Party	Candidate	Votes	%	±%
Conservative	Bhupen Dave	3,036	45.4	
Conservative	Geeta Karavadra	2,990	44.7	
Conservative	Devi Patel	2,844	42.6	
Labour	Piara Clair	2,008	30.1	
Labour	Gurinder Sandhu	1,761	26.4	
Labour	Priya Mendes	1,751	26.2	
Independent	Rita Patel	1,328	19.9	
Independent	Dharmesh Lakhani	941	14.1	
Independent	Rajul Tejura	761	11.4	
Liberal Democrats	Hash Chandarana	475	7.1	
Independent	Ross Willmott	384	5.7	
Liberal Democrats	Pradeep Gocal	301	4.5	
Liberal Democrats	Asit Sodha	213	3.2	
Turnout		6,682	50.59	
Rejected ballots		94	1.4	
Registered electors		13,209		
Conservative gain from Labour				
Conservative gain from Labour				
Conservative gain from Labour				

=== Thurncourt ===
Thurncourt (2 seats)
Party	Candidate	Votes	%	±%
Labour	Teresa Aldred	1,202	42.4	
Conservative	Abdul Osman	1,122	39.6	
Conservative	Mike Joannou	1,024	36.2	
Labour	Brahmpreet Gulati	998	35.2	
Green	Karen Wildin	293	10.3	
Liberal Democrats	Kate Sullivan	257	9.1	
Turnout		2,832	34.38	
Rejected ballots		30	1.1	
Registered electors		8,238		
Labour hold				
Conservative gain from Labour				

=== Troon ===
Troon (2 seats)
Party	Candidate	Votes	%	±%
Labour	Diane Cank	1,489	38.2	
Labour	Mohinder Sangha	1,432	36.8	
Conservative	Ashton Fernandes	1,329	34.1	
Conservative	Heten Tejura	1,244	31.9	
Independent	Sital Gill	567	14.6	
Independent	Kamlesh Kumari	439	11.3	
Independent	Karan Modha	307	7.9	
Liberal Democrats	Paul Smith	281	7.2	
Turnout		3,895	37.33	
Rejected ballots		46	1.2	
Registered electors		10,433		
Labour hold				
Labour hold				

=== Beaumont Leys ===
Beaumont Leys (3 seats)
Party	Candidate	Votes	%	±%
Conservative	Hazel Orton	1,470	37.7	
Conservative	Hemant Rae Bhatia	1,456	37.4	
Conservative	Paul Westley	1,420	36.5	
Labour	Denis Tanfa	1,278	32.8	
Labour	Mo Peberdy	1,235	31.7	
Labour	David Towers	1,234	31.7	
Green	Andrew Reeves	370	9.5	
Independent	Adrian Barnes	321	8.2	
Liberal Democrats	Daniel Irungu	299	7.7	
Liberal Democrats	Alieu Ceesay	233	6.0	
Turnout		3,578	27.97	
Rejected ballots		28	0.8	
Registered electors		12,791		
Conservative gain from Labour				
Conservative gain from Labour				
Conservative gain from Labour				

=== Braunstone Park & Rowley Fields ===
Braunstone Park & Rowley Fields (3 seats)
Party	Candidate	Votes	%	±%
Labour	Susan Barton	1,489	46.4	
Labour	Elaine Halford	1,419	44.2	
Labour	Kulwinder Johal	1,395	43.4	
Conservative	Jay Popat	805	25.1	
Conservative	Alexandros Ali	760	23.7	
Conservative	Ian Stanton-Wright	705	22.0	
Green	Neil Mcdermott	489	15.2	
Liberal Democrats	Ian Bradwell	370	11.5	
Independent	Jaspreet Gill	369	11.5	
Liberal Democrats	Kamal Panchmatia	259	8.1	
Liberal Democrats	Arshdeep Singh	245	7.6	
TUSC	Wayne Naylor	237	7.4	
Turnout		3,211	22.98	
Rejected ballots		31	1.0	
Registered electors		13,974		
Labour hold				
Labour hold				
Labour hold				

=== Fosse ===
Fosse (2 seats)
Party	Candidate	Votes	%	±%
Labour	Sue Waddington	999	41.1	
Labour	Syed Zaman	792	32.6	
Liberal Democrats	Benjamin Feist	580	23.9	
Conservative	Foligar Lang	535	22.0	
Conservative	Rally Pamsi	531	21.9	
Green	Geoff Forse	377	15.5	
Liberal Democrats	Martin Pold	355	14.6	
TUSC	Brian Scott	129	5.3	
Independent	Chikaire Ezeru	90	3.7	
Turnout		2,428	25.95	
Rejected ballots		24	1.0	
Registered electors		9,356		
Labour hold				
Labour hold				

=== Westcotes ===
Westcotes (2 seats)
Party	Candidate	Votes	%	±%
Labour	Sarah Russell	986	45.2	
Labour	Adam Clarke	818	37.5	
Liberal Democrats	Parmjit Gill	482	22.1	
Liberal Democrats	Juliet Gill	357	16.4	
Green	Jessica Southworth	353	16.2	
Conservative	Dhirubhai Dholakia	283	13.0	
Conservative	Sofia Ali	243	11.0	
Independent	Jacky Nangreave	231	10.6	
Independent	Michael Shenton	137	6.3	
Turnout		2,182	25.44	
Rejected ballots		25	1.1	
Registered electors		8,578		
Labour hold				
Labour hold				

=== Western ===
Western (3 seats)
Party	Candidate	Votes	%	±%
Labour	Vi Dempster	1,536	42.1	
Labour	Molly O'Neill	1,465	40.1	
Labour	Orlanzo Cole	1,441	39.5	
Conservative	Richard Tutt	998	27.3	
Conservative	Kanchan Choudhary	993	27.2	
Conservative	Jay Thobhani	967	26.5	
Independent	Gary O'Donnell	840	23.0	
Green	Tine Juhlert	707	19.4	
Liberal Democrats	Chris Sidwell-Smith	548	15.0	
Turnout		3,651	25.73	
Rejected ballots		19	0.5	
Registered electors		14,187		
Labour hold				
Labour hold				
Labour hold				

=== Castle ===
Castle (3 seats)
Party	Candidate	Votes	%	±%
Green	Patrick Kitterick	1,564	48.0	
Green	Mick Gregg	1,453	44.6	
Green	Liz Sahu	1,419	43.5	
Labour	Danny Myers	1,219	37.4	
Labour	Lee Holmes	1,128	34.6	
Labour	Chizor Onwuegbute	1,101	33.8	
Conservative	Jayaram Shastri	309	9.5	
Liberal Democrats	Nathan Gubbins	288	8.8	
Liberal Democrats	Philip Smith	209	6.4	
Liberal Democrats	Hania Orszulik	196	6.0	
Turnout		3,261	30.43	
Rejected ballots		22	0.7	
Registered electors		10,718		
Green gain from Labour				
Green gain from Labour				
Green gain from Labour				

=== Eyres Monsell ===
Eyres Monsell (2 seats)
Party	Candidate	Votes	%	±%
Labour	Elaine Pantling	791	50.9	
Labour	Karen Pickering	644	41.4	
Conservative	Mohammad Ahmadi	389	25.0	
Conservative	Vineed Vijayan	373	24.0	
Green	Anna Broszkiewicz	174	11.2	
Liberal Democrats	Jo Webb	147	9.5	
Liberal Democrats	Zelda Rubinstein	141	9.1	
Turnout		1,554	19.30	
Rejected ballots		20	1.3	
Registered electors		8,052		
Labour hold				
Labour hold				

=== Knighton ===
Knighton (3 seats)
Party	Candidate	Votes	%	±%
Labour	Melissa March	2,203	43.9	
Labour	Lynn Moore	2,071	41.3	
Labour	Geoff Whittle	2,067	41.2	
Liberal Democrats	Chris Willmott	1,198	23.9	
Green	Sue King	1,053	21.0	
Liberal Democrats	Jorawar Bhoot	1,000	19.9	
Conservative	Ravinder Lall	981	19.6	
Conservative	Lu Mistry	886	17.7	
Conservative	Amar Tanna	866	17.3	
Liberal Democrats	Roopal Shah	843	16.8	
Green	Bill Walker	692	13.8	
TUSC	Alex Gillham	208	4.1	
Turnout		5,015	40.00	
Rejected ballots		29	0.6	
Registered electors		12,538		
Labour hold				
Labour hold				
Labour hold				

=== Saffron ===
Saffron (2 seats)
Party	Candidate	Votes	%	±%
Labour	Ted Cassidy	783	43.6	
Labour	Elly Cutkelvin	774	43.1	
Green	Ursula Bilson	438	24.4	
Green	Mags Lewis	428	23.8	
Conservative	Gillian Jillett	286	15.9	
Conservative	Julie Simons	284	15.8	
Liberal Democrats	Denise Buchan	95	5.3	
TUSC	Peter Bisson	80	4.5	
Liberal Democrats	Michael Smith	78	4.3	
Communist	Ann Green	42	2.3	
British Democrats	David Haslett	34	1.9	
Turnout		1,797	23.04	
Rejected ballots		14	0.8	
Registered electors		7,798		
Labour hold				
Labour hold				

=== Spinney Hills ===
Spinney Hills (2 seats)
Party	Candidate	Votes	%	±%
Labour	Misbah Batool	2,513	52.8	
Labour	Ghulam Malik	2,455	51.6	
Conservative	Mohammed Fozdar	1,121	23.6	
Conservative	Sheraz Durrani	713	15.0	
Independent	Shahid Khan	671	14.1	
Independent	Iqbal Desai	510	10.7	
Liberal Democrats	Christopher Garner	277	5.8	
Green	Jan Grothusen	219	4.6	
ADF	Abdul Vali	138	2.9	
Turnout		4,757	51.72	
Rejected ballots		74	1.6	
Registered electors		9,198		
Labour hold				
Labour hold				

=== Stoneygate ===
Stoneygate (3 seats)
Party	Candidate	Votes	%	±%
Labour	Raffiq Mohammed	2,898	45.3	
Labour	Yasmin Surti	2,777	43.5	
Labour	Manjula Sood	2,107	33.0	
Conservative	Abdul Giash	1,688	26.4	
Independent	Mohammed Thalukdar	1,504	23.5	
Independent	Kirk Master	1,503	23.5	
Independent	Sharmen Rahman	1,153	18.0	
Conservative	Saeed Khilji	1,017	15.9	
Conservative	Shirin Shahid	954	14.9	
Liberal Democrats	Aqdus Ghafar	535	8.4	
Green	Chris Hughes	534	8.4	
Liberal Democrats	Alan Fox	529	8.3	
Turnout		6,391	46.52	
Rejected ballots		53	0.8	
Registered electors		13,738		
Labour hold				
Labour hold				
Labour hold				

=== Wycliffe ===
Wycliffe (2 seats)
Party	Candidate	Votes	%	±%
Labour	Hanif Aqbany	3,690	67.6	
Labour	Mohammed Dawood	3,681	67.4	
Conservative	Zakaria Ahmed	1,218	22.3	
Conservative	Subane Abdi	1,168	21.4	
Liberal Democrats	Hoque Akramul	275	5.0	
Green	Sarah Read	219	4.0	
TUSC	Tessa Warrington	116	2.1	
Turnout		5,458	56.17	
Rejected ballots		51	0.9	
Registered electors		9,717		
Labour hold				
Labour hold				

== Post-election ==
=== Affiliation changes ===
- Diane Cank, elected for Labour, left the party in August 2023 to sit as an independent.
- Sanjay Modhwadia was suspended from the Conservative Party in March 2024 following an argument in a public car park. The police investigated the allegations and decided there was no evidence that a criminal offence had been committed; by July 2024 he had been readmitted to the Conservatives.
- Deepak Bajaj, elected as a Conservative in 2023 (but previously elected for Labour in 2019, having defected to the Conservatives in 2022) re-joined Labour in April 2024.
- Nagarjun "Nags" Agath, elected as a Conservative, left the party to sit as an independent in June 2024, in order to allow him to stand as an independent candidate in Leicester East in the 2024 United Kingdom general election.

=== By-elections ===
==== Stoneygate ====
The by-election was triggered by the death of Labour councillor Manjula Sood on 24 December 2025.

Stoneygate by-election: 19 February 2026
Party	Candidate	Votes	%	±%
Green	Aasiya Bora	1,195	30.4	▲22.9
Labour	Adam Sabat	1,089	27.7	▼12.8
One Leicester	Alef Uddin	638	16.2	N/A
Independent	Faisal Noor	453	11.5	N/A
Conservative	Rashmikant Joshi	327	8.3	▼15.3
Reform	Michael Dabrowski	106	2.7	N/A
Liberal Democrats	Asit Sodha	62	1.6	▼5.9
Independent	Michael Barker	61	1.6	N/A
Majority		106	2.7	
Turnout		3,945	27.75	▼18.7
Rejected ballots		13	0.3	
Registered electors		14,214		
Green gain from Labour				

== See also ==
- 2019 Elections
- 2023 Local Elections
- 2023 Mayoral Elections
