= Manjula Sood =

British politician (1945–2025)

Manjula Sood MBE

Lord Mayor of Leicester
- In office May 2008 – May 2009
- Preceded by: Gary Hunt
- Succeeded by: Roger Blackmore

Leicester City Councillor
- In office 4 May 2023 – 24 December 2025
- In office 14 October 1996 – 6 May 2019

Personal details
- Born: Manjula Paul Sood; 23 December 1945
- Died: 24 December 2025 (aged 80) London, England
- Party: Labour
- Spouse: Paul Sood (died 1996)
- Website: manjulasood.com

Manjula Paul Sood (23 December 1945 – 24 December 2025) was a British Labour Party politician, community service participant and educator. In 2008, Sood became the first Asian female Lord Mayor in the United Kingdom.

== Background ==
Sood immigrated to the United Kingdom in 1970. In 1973 she became the first female Asian primary school teacher in Leicester, England. She taught there for almost 20 years before retiring because of ill health. During her time as a teacher, she introduced multiculturalism into the education sector in Leicester.

Sood died in London on 24 December 2025, at the age of 80.

== Political career ==
Sood was first elected after the death of her councillor husband in 1996. Paul Sood was one of the first Asians in Britain to become a councillor; he was elected as a councillor for the Leicestershire County Council in 1982 and served for almost 14 years before his death. Sood stood in the by-election for her husband's former seat and won.

In May 2008, Sood became Lord Mayor of Leicester, the first Asian female Lord Mayor in the United Kingdom, in over 800 years of the Lord Mayor title.

Sood ceased to be a councillor for Belgrave in 2019 but was again elected at the 2023 Leicester City Council election for the Stoneygate ward.

=== Positions at the time of her death ===
- Trustee and an executive director for the Leicester Council of Faiths, which promotes a better understanding among religions
- Vice chair and women's officer for the Constituency Labour Party (CLP)
- Member of the Asian Refuge Shelter, assisting Asian women going through turmoil in their private lives
- Member of the Afro-Caribbean Working Party
- Member of the Standard and Audit Committee of Leicester City Council, safeguarding the Audit Commission's code of conduct, which elected members of the council and council officials must abide by
- Member of Children and Young Persons scrutiny committee
- Trustee for the North Memorial Homes in Leicester, a charity for war veterans
- Vice chair and public relations officer for a fibromyalgia charity
- Member of the Leicester Domestic Violence forum
- Member of the Older People Forum where she worked to raise the political profile of older people, locally and nationally
- Member of the Faith Regeneration Advisory Group, where she engaged with developing a multi religion centre in Leicester
- Member on the Inter Faith Network UK from 1995
- Chair of mental health regional conferences and member, Department of Health, Care Services Improvement Partnership (CSIP)

=== Initiatives ===
- Organiser for liaising with the Indian High Commission to come to Leicester on a monthly basis to issue visas
- Chair of Naari Lets, an organisation encouraging ethnic minority women in Leicester to become more immersed in commerce

== Awards and achievements ==
- Awarded an Honorary Doctorate of Laws by Leicester University in July 2008.
- Awarded an MBE in the 2009 Birthday Honours for services to the community in Leicester.
- Sport England Regional Champion for East Midlands.
- Leicestershire and Rutland Women of the Year Award 2005, the first Asian woman to receive the award
- Served as the High Bailiff of Leicester from May 2007
- NRI Institute Excellence Award 2008 for Contribution to Politics
- Labour Party Merit Award Winner for contribution to the Labour Party 2004. The first Asian woman to win.
- Red Hot Curry's top 300 most influential Asian women in the UK 2002
- Triangle Media Group Global Award for outstanding contribution to local politics 2006
- Received an honorary award from the Leicestershire Asian Business Association (LABA) for assistance to small businesses

=== Benchmarks ===
- Leicester City's first female Asian elected councillor, a position held from 1996
- Participated in the last three International Women's Days, speaking to large audiences on the challenges and barriers women face in society and the progress they have made since the turn of the 21st century.
