= Sandip Verma, Baroness Verma =

Indian-British politician

The Right Honourable The Baroness Verma
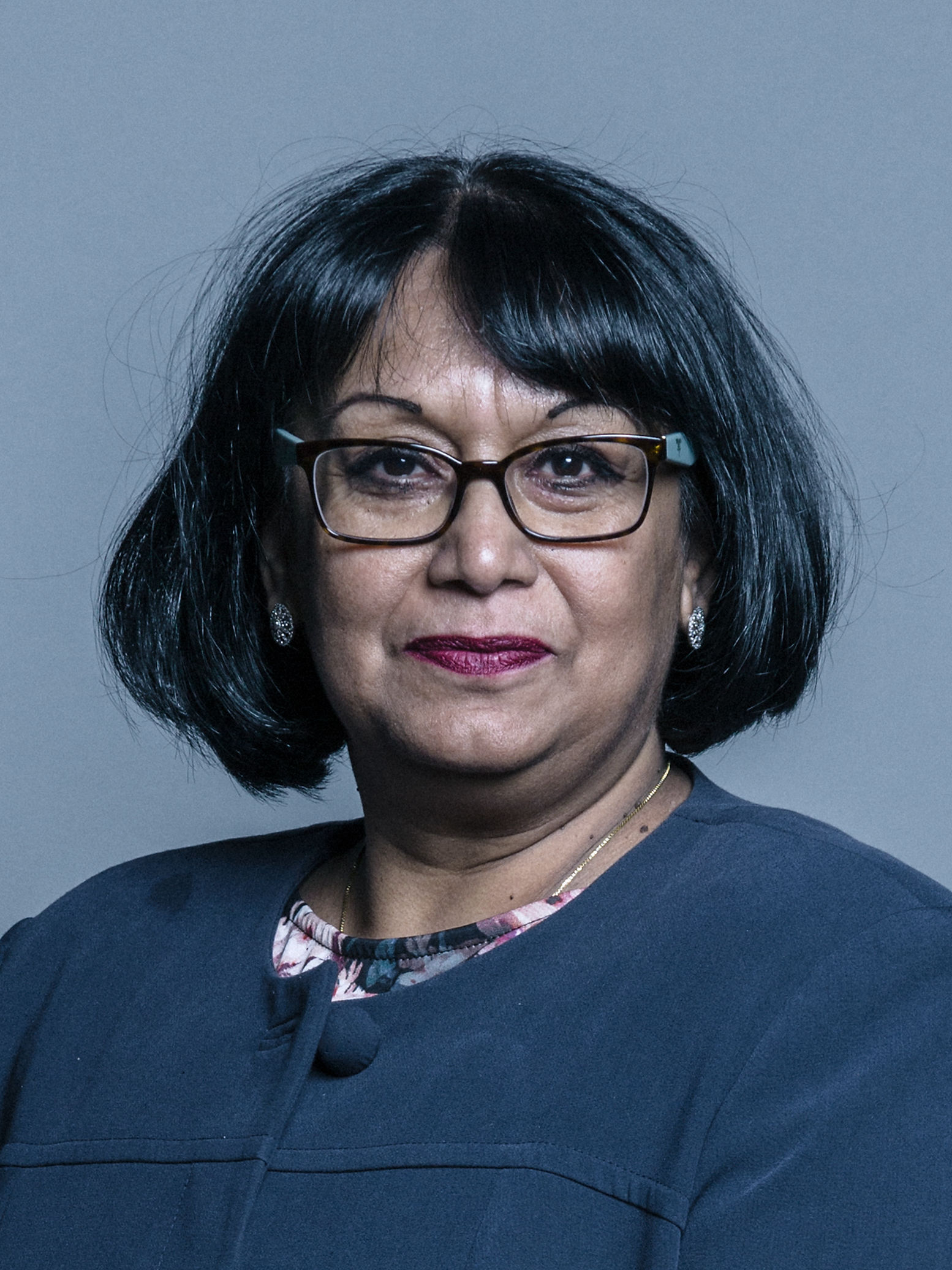
- Official portrait, 2017

Parliamentary Under-Secretary of State for International Development
- In office 7 May 2015 – 13 July 2016
- Prime Minister: David Cameron
- Preceded by: The Baroness Northover
- Succeeded by: James Wharton

Parliamentary Under-Secretary of State for Energy and Climate Change
- In office 4 September 2012 – 7 May 2015
- Prime Minister: David Cameron
- Preceded by: The Lord Marland
- Succeeded by: The Lord Bourne of Aberystwyth

Baroness-in-waiting Government Whip
- In office 11 May 2010 – 4 September 2012
- Prime Minister: David Cameron
- Preceded by: The Baroness Crawley
- Succeeded by: The Lord Ahmad of Wimbledon

Member of the House of Lords
- Lord Temporal
- Life peerage 2 June 2006

Personal details
- Born: 30 June 1959 (age 67) Amritsar, Punjab, India
- Party: Conservative

Sandip K. Verma, Baroness Verma (born 30 June 1959) known until 1977 as Sandip K. Rana, is a British Indian politician in the United Kingdom. An appointed member of the House of Lords, she is Ministerial Champion for Tackling Violence Against Women and Girls Overseas, a role who chairs the UN Women's national committee. Verma was the Parliamentary Under-Secretary of State for International Development, from 2015 to 2016.

== Life ==
Born in Amritsar in the Indian Punjab, as a child Verma migrated with her parents to England, arriving in 1960. In 1977, aged seventeen, she married Ashok Verma. They have two children. She is the grand-daughter of the Indian freedom fighter Ujagar Singh, who was a former leader of the Indian Workers' Association and the India League.

She made her living in their high fashion business before she invested in supplying residential care. This was enabled by the Conservative party's policy of privatisation and the main customer was Leicester Council.

Verma was an unsuccessful Conservative parliamentary candidate in Kingston upon Hull East at the 2001 United Kingdom general election, finishing third, and in Wolverhampton South West in the general election of 2005, coming second to the Labour incumbent, Rob Marris.

On 2 June 2006, she was created a life peer, taking the title Baroness Verma, of Leicester in the County of Leicestershire. The same year, she was appointed as a Patron of the Tory Reform Group.

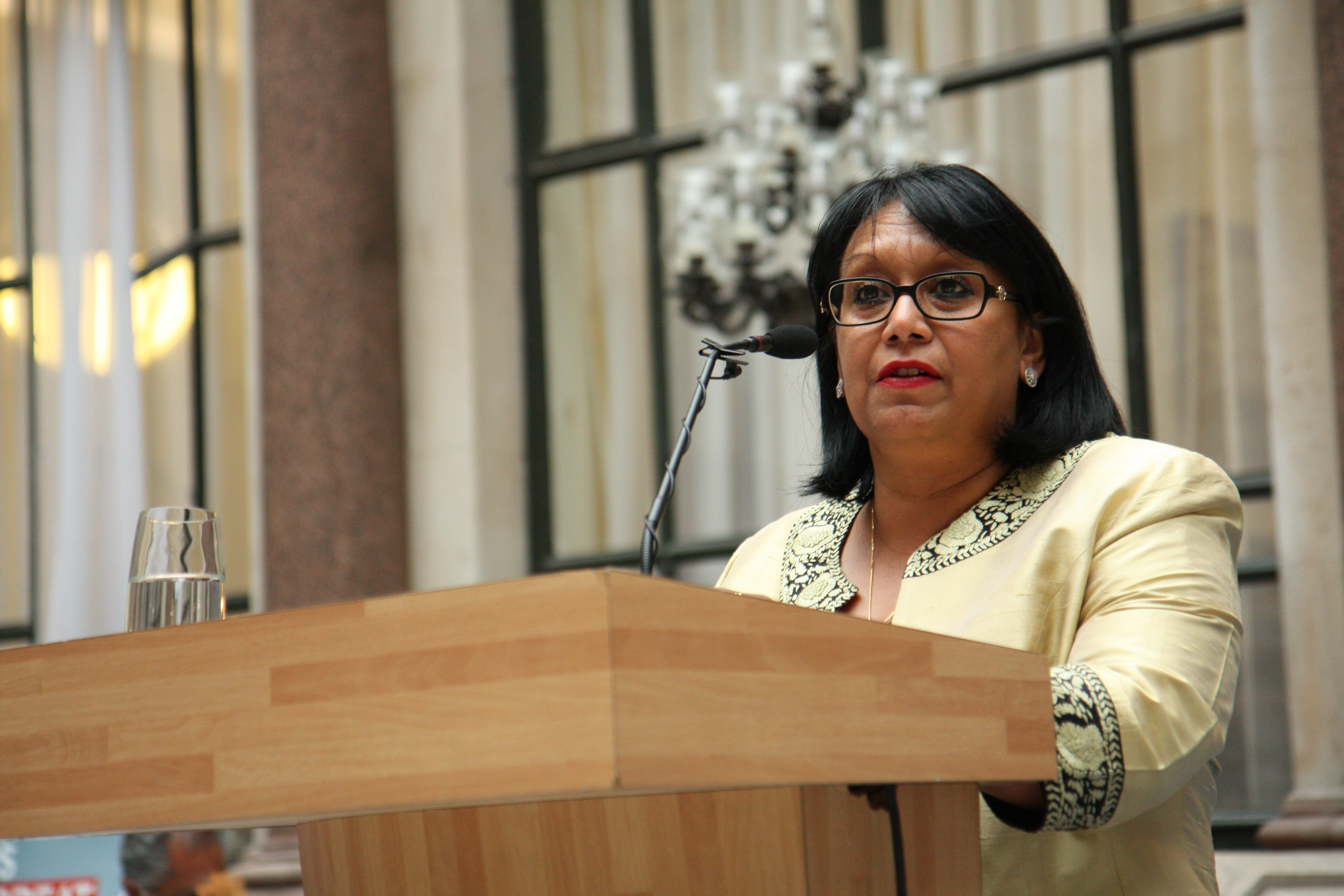
Verma speaks at the launch of the 13th London Mela at the Foreign Office in London on July 23, 2015.

Until the formation of the Conservative-Liberal Democrat coalition following the May 2010 general election, Verma was an Opposition Whip and Conservative Spokesperson in the House of Lords on Education and Skills and for Health. In 2010 she became a Government Whip and Spokesperson for the Cabinet Office, International Development, and Equalities and Women's Issues.

She was Parliamentary Under-Secretary of State in the Department of Energy and Climate Change from 2012 to 2015, and then for International Development from May 2015 to July 2016.

When the new Theresa May ministry was formed in July 2016, following the resignation of David Cameron, Verma was not included in it.

Verma was adopted as the Conservative candidate for the position of directly elected Mayor of Leicester in 2019. She lost to Labour's Peter Soulsby, coming second with 14,519 votes compared to Sir Peter's 51,444 votes. Later that year she as Ministerial Champion for Tackling Violence Against Women and Girls Overseas, was chosen to chair the UN Women's national committee for three years.

In September 2020 Verma apologised for not consulting the Advisory Committee on Business Appointments before taking a directorship in a family firm which made solar power contracts with the controversial Government of Uganda led by General Yoweri Museveni. However, she denied any wrongdoing and stated “I am truly sorry for my misunderstanding of the rules which I accept is my failing and sincerely hope that the committee will accept my deepest regret at this failure. I would not deliberately disrespect the rules and sincerely apologise to the committee”.

== University of Roehampton ==
In April 2022, Baroness Verma was appointed Chancellor of the University of Roehampton. She was formally invested as Chancellor in a ceremony on 18 May 2023.
