= Nigel Porter =

British politician

Cllr. Nigel Porter
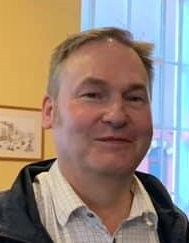
- Nigel Porter in 2019

Leader of the Opposition on Leicester City Council
- In office 2 May 2019 – 5 May 2023
- Preceded by: Vacant
- Succeeded by: Deepak Bajaj

Leicester City Councillor for Aylestone Ward
- Incumbent
- Assumed office 27 September 2004
- Preceded by: Jean Middleton

Personal details
- Party: Liberal Democrats (2011–present)
- Other political affiliations: Conservative (2004-2011)

Nigel Carl Porter is a Liberal Democrat politician in the City of Leicester. He served as the Leader of the Opposition on the Leicester City Council from 2019 to 2023, and has been a ward councillor for Aylestone since 2004.

== Political career ==
Nigel Porter was first elected as a ward councillor for Aylestone in a 2004 by-election, retaining the seat for the Conservative Party following a vacancy caused by the departure of Jean Middleton. He held his seat at the 2007 local elections, finishing second in a two-person ward.

In January 2011, Porter was de-selected as the Conservative Party, pending an investigation into a breach of data protection laws. After a seven-month investigation, he was absolved of all charges. In March, Porter joined the Liberal Democrat group on the city council and was announced as the party's candidate in Aylestone Ward for the upcoming elections. He was the sole Liberal Democrat candidate returned at the 2011 City Council Elections, coming first in Aylestone Ward with 32.2% of the vote. Following the election, Porter attempted to create an opposition group coalition with the only remaining Conservative Councillor.

Porter received national attention after he was forced to apologise in 2017 after making an innuendo about the name of Labour Councillor, John Thomas during a city council debate. Porter called the investigation 'politically motivated' and 'something out of Stalin's Russia' after the Labour-ran Council attempted to have him removed from future Council meetings. Porter has repeatedly accused Labour councillors of bullying, including making jibes about his mental health, threats to 'break his knuckles' and being told that 'There's a lot of us and only one of you. You want to be careful'.

Porter was re-elected in the 2015 City Council election, with a majority of eighty-two votes over the third-placed Conservative candidate.

In 2019, Porter accused the Labour Council of "gagging" him during a budget debate after he was stopped from questioning Labour Mayor, Peter Soulsby's business interests in the Cultural Quarter.

Porter was the Liberal Democrat candidate for the directly elected mayor of Leicester in the 2019 election, pledging to support a referendum to abolish the position if elected. He finished fourth, receiving 5.0% of the vote. However, he was comfortably re-elected as a Councillor, finishing first in his ward. 2019 was the third consecutive election that he was the only Liberal Democrat elected in Leicester.

Following the 2019 Election, Porter was the only opposition councillor on the Leicester City Council. He thus took the position of Leader of the Opposition.

At the beginning of the COVID-19 pandemic, Porter called for face-masks to be provided for free to Leicester citizens, in light of rising cases in the city. The suggestion was labelled "ridiculous" by city mayor, Sir Peter Soulsby. Porter's intervention secured a donation of 2,000 face masks from private businesses for Aylestone residents. Porter subsequently called for Soulsby to resign after it emerged that the mayor had broken COVID-19 restrictions during lockdown.

Porter was reelected on 4 May 2023 with an increased majority and the second seat in the Aylestone ward was won by fellow Liberal Democrat candidate Scott Kennedy-Lount. The pair were joined Zuffar Haq who was elected in the Evington ward, resulting in a Liberal Democrat group of three councillors.
