= One Leicester =

- Leader: Rita Patel
- Founded: 2023
- Headquarters: 25 Heybridge Road, Leicester, LE5 0AP
- Leicester City Council: 0 / 54

One Leicester is a locally based political party in Leicester, England. Promoting localism, it was founded by Rita Patel, a former assistant mayor.

== History ==
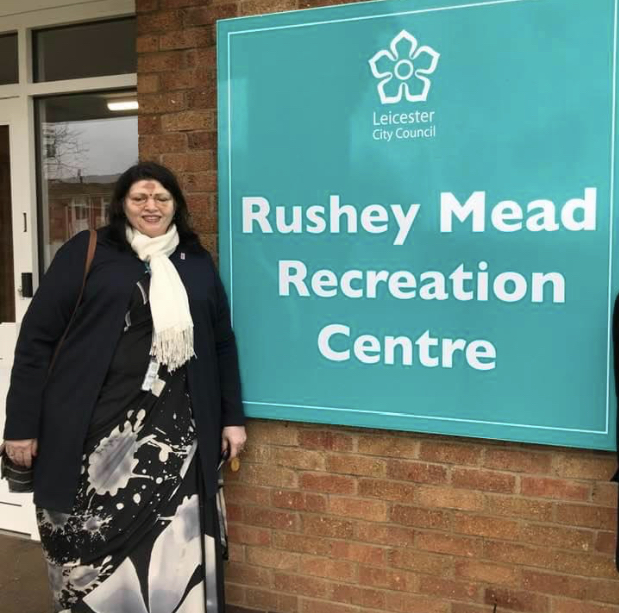
Party founder Rita Patel

Patel, who was assistant mayor for adult social care and for communities, founded the party after being suspended from the Labour Party following an attempt by her and two other Labour councillors to abolish the office of mayor. The party was founded in August 2023, promising a referendum on the mayoralty if elected; the launch coincided with the suspension by Patel's former party Labour of the whole Leicester East party. Patel had earlier stood as an independent for the mayoralty with a pledge to abolish the role, losing to incumbent Peter Soulsby.

In May 2024, Councillor Diane Cank joined One Leicester. A long-standing representative of Troon Ward, Cank had left Labour in August 2023 and had sat as an independent. Cank joined the Green Party in November 2026, leaving One Leicester with no representation on Leicester City Council.

== Electoral history ==
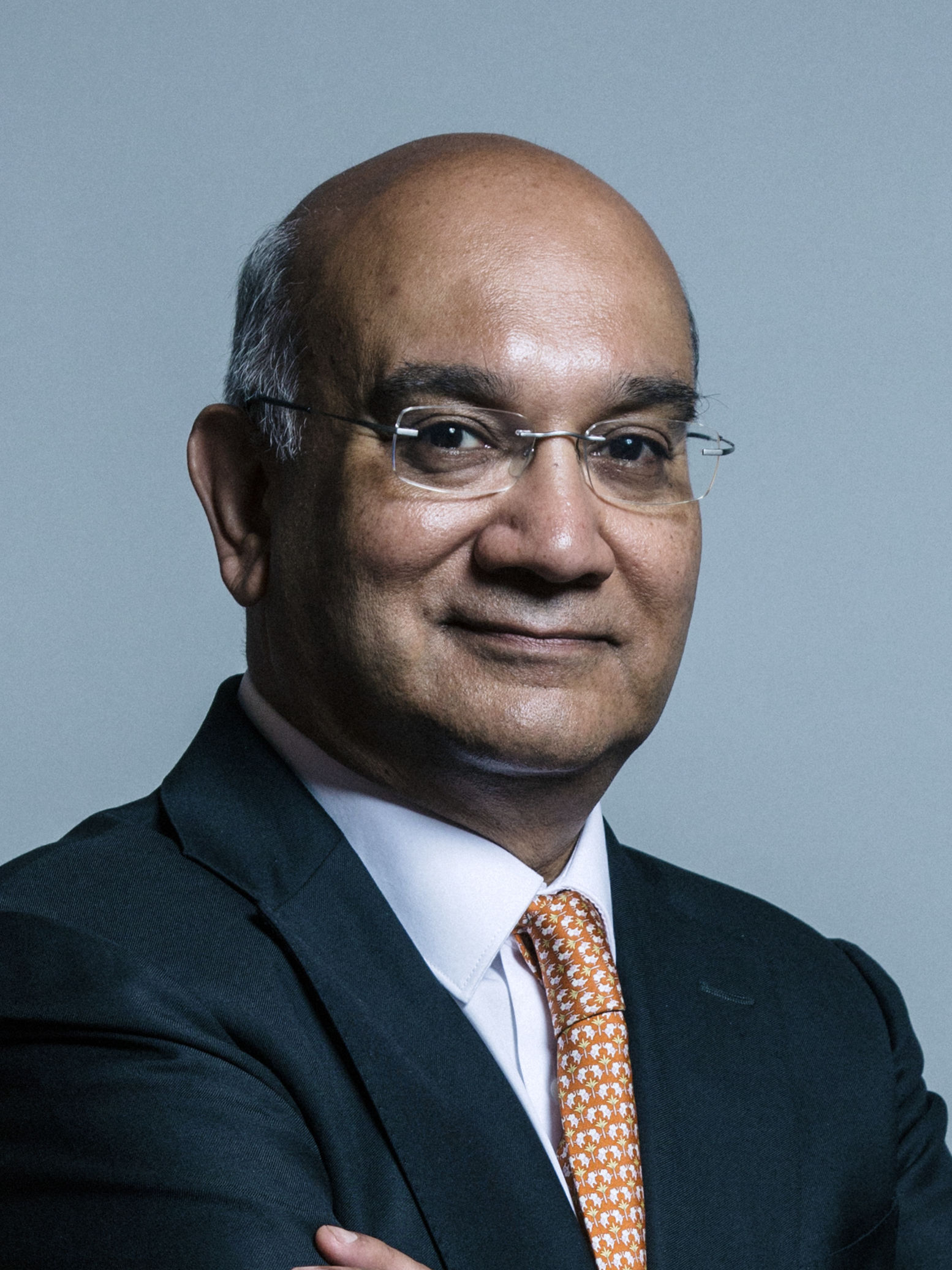
Former MP Keith Vaz was One Leicester's candidate for Leicester East in the 2024 general election.

In May 2024, Fizza Askari stood for One Leicester to be Leicestershire Police and Crime Commissioner.

Former Labour MP Keith Vaz stood for the party in Leicester East in July 2024, the constituency he stood down from in 2019 following a sex and drugs scandal. He announced his campaign for One Leicester while still a member of Labour, from which he was expelled. The Guardian said his campaign was "well-publicised and slick", receiving support from Shilpa Shetty. Election pledges included donating his salary to charity and having his office open every day. He came fifth, with 3,681 votes (7.9%) The party's candidate for Leicester West was businessman Rahoul Naik. Naik came sixth with 327 votes (0.9%), losing his deposit.

In February 2026, Alef Uddin stood for the party in a council by-election in Stoneygate, coming third with 638 votes.

== See also ==
- List of Labour Party breakaway parties (UK)
