= 1995 Leicester City Council election =

1995 English local election

The 1995 Leicester City Council election took place on 4 May 1995 to elect members of Leicester City Council in England. This was on the same day as other local elections.

== Summary ==
1995 Leicester City Council election
Party	Seats	Gains	Losses	Net gain/loss	Seats %	Votes %	Votes	+/−
Labour	45			▲8	80.4	59.0	83,193	+11.3
Liberal Democrats	7			▲1	12.5	18.5	26,052	+0.8
Conservative	4			▼9	7.1	18.6	26,240	–13.5
Independent Labour	0			Steady	0.0	2.0	2,808	N/A
Green	0			Steady	0.0	1.7	2,468	–0.7
Militant Labour	0			Steady	0.0	0.1	146	N/A
Liberal	0			Steady	0.0	0.1	129	N/A
