= 2003 Leicester City Council election =

2003 English local election

Results of the 2003 Leicester City Council election

The 2003 Leicester City Council election took place on 1 May 2003 to elect members of Leicester City Council in England. This was on the same day as other local elections.

The whole council was up for election on new ward boundaries and the total number of seats was reduced from 56 to 54.

== Summary ==
2003 Leicester City Council election
Party	Seats	Gains	Losses	Net gain/loss	Seats %	Votes %	Votes	+/−
Liberal Democrats	25			▲9	46.3	32.8	56,213	+5.6
Labour	19			▼11	35.2	36.0	61,753	–11.7
Conservative	9			▼1	16.7	22.5	38,554	+0.3
Green	1			▲1	1.9	4.9	8,410	+2.7
Independent	0			Steady	0.0	2.3	3,932	+1.8
Socialist Labour	0			Steady	0.0	0.9	1,579	+0.7
BNP	0			Steady	0.0	0.5	886	N/A
Socialist Alliance	0			Steady	0.0	0.1	192	N/A

== Results by Ward (A-Z) ==
=== Abbey (3) ===
Abbey
Party	Candidate	Votes	%
Liberal Democrats	Maguerite Henry	1,597	59.0
Liberal Democrats	John Fitch	1,505	55.6
Liberal Democrats	Paul Smith	1,430	52.8
Labour	Lilavanti Pandya	779	28.8
Labour	Vasudev Skukla	766	28.3
Labour	Tejinder Sohansoha	736	27.2
Conservative	Brian Smith	452	16.7
Conservative	Frances Ashlin	443	16.4
Conservative	Ronald Smith	411	15.2
Turnout		2706	
Liberal Democrats win (new seat)			
Liberal Democrats win (new seat)			
Liberal Democrats win (new seat)			

=== Aylestone (2) ===
Aylestone
Party	Candidate	Votes	%
Conservative	Barbara Chambers	1,275	51.8
Conservative	Jean Middleton	1,212	49.2
Liberal Democrats	Christopher Garner	552	22.4
Liberal Democrats	Geoffrey Pool	543	22.1
Labour	Gwen Abraham	488	19.8
Labour	Neil Clayton	473	19.2
Green	Christine Worth	196	8.0
Green	Thomas O'Connell	185	7.5
Turnout		2462	
Conservative win (new seat)			
Conservative win (new seat)			

=== Beaumont Leys (3) ===
Beaumont Leys
Party	Candidate	Votes	%
Labour	Gordon Getliffe	1,031	52.7
Labour	Paul Westley	955	48.8
Labour	Keith Lloyd-Harris	927	47.4
Conservative	Clifford Farren	577	29.5
Conservative	Alan Mohin	519	26.5
Conservative	Harischandra Mapara	494	25.2
Liberal Democrats	Terence Knight	452	23.1
Liberal Democrats	John Taylor	426	21.8
Liberal Democrats	William Matthews	423	21.6
Socialist Alternative	Simon Furze	67	3.4
Turnout		1957	
Labour win (new seat)			
Labour win (new seat)			
Labour win (new seat)			

=== Belgrave (2) ===
Belgrave
Party	Candidate	Votes	%
Labour	Ramnik Kavia	1,919	64.5
Labour	Colin Hall	1,552	52.1
Independent	Sakarlal Gajjar	857	28.8
Liberal Democrats	Hasmukh Chandarana	601	20.2
Conservative	Jill Allen	410	13.8
Conservative	Matthew Peacock	332	11.2
Green	Richard Fletcher	151	5.1
Green	Jonathan Swift	132	4.4
Turnout		2977	
Labour win (new seat)			
Labour win (new seat)			

=== Braunstone Park & Rowley Fields (3) ===
Braunstone Park & Rowley Fields
Party	Candidate	Votes	%
Liberal Democrats	Andrew Metcalfe	1,098	41.7
Liberal Democrats	Andrew Vincent	1,032	39.2
Liberal Democrats	Joy Seare	1,026	39.0
Labour	Michael Cooke	998	37.9
Labour	Denis McBride	959	36.5
Labour	Wayne Naylor	938	35.7
Conservative	William Ashford	442	16.8
Conservative	Gordon Goode	428	16.3
Conservative	Jane Ritchie	413	15.7
Green	Brian Fewster	166	6.3
Green	Yvonne Peake	143	5.4
Socialist Alternative	Stephen Score	125	4.8
Green	Desmont Peake	121	4.6
Turnout		2630	
Liberal Democrats win (new seat)			
Liberal Democrats win (new seat)			
Liberal Democrats win (new seat)			

=== Castle (3) ===
Castle
Party	Candidate	Votes	%
Labour	Susan Waddington	748	30.6
Liberal Democrats	Deborah Almey	747	30.5
Labour	Patrick Kitterick	708	28.9
Green	Robert Ball	708	28.9
Liberal Democrats	Roberto Bilbao	707	28.9
Labour	Telat Toy	688	28.1
Liberal Democrats	Kuldeep Nagra	574	23.5
Green	Margaret Layton	517	21.1
Conservative	Andrew Bayford	511	20.9
Green	Chris Hughes	497	20.3
Conservative	Alistair Harkness	468	19.1
Conservative	Edward Price	466	19.1
Turnout		2446	
Labour win (new seat)			
Liberal Democrats win (new seat)			
Labour win (new seat)			

On the final count, Patrick Kitterick of Labour and Robert Ball of the Greens were tied in votes. Councillor Kitterick was eventually elected via a drawing of lots.

=== Charnwood (2) ===
Charnwood
Party	Candidate	Votes	%
Labour	William Shelton	879	42.5
Labour	John Thomas	823	39.8
Liberal Democrats	Abdul Alam	740	35.8
Liberal Democrats	Salim Ingar	697	33.7
Conservative	Robert Redman	302	14.6
Conservative	Clifford Maw	293	14.2
Socialist Labour	Avtar Sahota	121	5.8
Independent	Shirley Bennett	114	5.5
Independent	Melissa Bennett	111	5.4
Socialist Labour	Matthew Widdowson	58	2.8
Turnout		2069	
Labour win (new seat)			
Labour win (new seat)			

=== Coleman (2) ===
Coleman
Party	Candidate	Votes	%
Labour	Mary Draycott	1,573	47.6
Labour	Piara Clair	1,538	46.5
Liberal Democrats	Pratap Jethwa	1,413	42.7
Liberal Democrats	Bashir Adam	1,340	40.5
Conservative	Marion Johnson	396	12.0
Conservative	Pauline O'Brien	351	10.6
Turnout		3306	
Labour win (new seat)			
Labour win (new seat)			

=== Evington (2) ===
Evington
Party	Candidate	Votes	%
Conservative	Anthony O'Brien	1,758	47.4
Conservative	Michael Johnson	1,697	45.7
Labour	Kartar Sandhu	1,376	37.1
Labour	David Gorrod	1,367	36.8
Liberal Democrats	Robert Carter	706	19.0
Liberal Democrats	Arif Manjothi	515	13.9
Turnout		3710	
Conservative win (new seat)			
Conservative win (new seat)			

=== Eyres Monsell (2) ===
Eyres Monsell
Party	Candidate	Votes	%
Liberal Democrats	Mark Farmer	1,239	47.4
Liberal Democrats	Dean Ramsdale	1,041	39.8
Labour	Yvonne Todd	837	32.0
Labour	Amanda Herald	762	29.2
Conservative	Teck Khong	527	20.2
Conservative	Michael Parr	385	14.7
BNP	Edward Scott	299	11.4
Green	Sarah Ware	72	2.8
Green	Stephanie Bailey-Grice	64	2.4
Turnout		2613	
Liberal Democrats win (new seat)			
Liberal Democrats win (new seat)			

=== Fosse (2) ===
Fosse
Party	Candidate	Votes	%
Liberal Democrats	Phyllis Green	901	34.7
Labour	Robert Wann	843	32.5
Liberal Democrats	Richard Hickson	823	31.7
Labour	Abdul Osman	731	28.1
Green	Geoffrey Forse	661	25.5
Green	Mark Sperry	484	18.6
Conservative	Julian John	401	15.4
Conservative	Ravinder Taylor	349	13.4
Turnout		2597	
Liberal Democrats win (new seat)			
Labour win (new seat)			

=== Freemen (2) ===
Freemen
Party	Candidate	Votes	%
Liberal Democrats	Dale Keeling	582	33.3
Liberal Democrats	Carlym Sandringham	506	28.7
Labour	Patrick Baines	424	24.3
Labour	Donald Sherriff	392	22.4
Independent	Julie Simons	347	19.9
Conservative	Nicholas Austin	249	14.2
Green	Thomas O'Connell	221	12.6
Conservative	Darrell Laxton	210	12.0
Independent	Arvind Mistry	208	11.9
Green	Matthew Gough	194	11.1
BNP	Kevin Yates	163	9.3
Turnout		1748	
Liberal Democrats win (new seat)			
Liberal Democrats win (new seat)			

=== Humberstone & Hamilton (3) ===
Humberstone & Hamilton
Party	Candidate	Votes	%
Conservative	John Mugglestone	1,848	63.6
Conservative	Roman Scuplak	1,791	61.7
Conservative	Stephen Thompson	1,738	59.8
Labour	Rashmikant Joshi	1,209	41.6
Labour	Richard Thomas	1,101	37.9
Labour	Robert Waterton	1,029	35.4
Turnout		2905	
Conservative win (new seat)			
Conservative win (new seat)			
Conservative win (new seat)			

=== Knighton (3) ===
Knighton
Party	Candidate	Votes	%
Liberal Democrats	Gary Hunt	2,243	46.0
Liberal Democrats	Barry Coles	2,211	45.3
Liberal Democrats	Joan Garrity	2,171	44.5
Conservative	Ross Grant	1,581	32.4
Conservative	Philip Northen	1,565	32.1
Conservative	Albert Veldhuizen	1,497	30.7
Labour	Sarah Russell	761	15.6
Labour	Michael Pullin	737	15.1
Labour	Edward Hasman	732	15.0
Green	Simon Bennett	436	8.9
Green	Indira Nath	373	7.6
Green	Michael Sackin	337	6.9
Turnout		4881	
Liberal Democrats win (new seat)			
Liberal Democrats win (new seat)			
Liberal Democrats win (new seat)			

=== Latimer (2) ===
Latimer
Party	Candidate	Votes	%
Labour	Mansukhlal Chohan	2,986	71.1
Labour	Manjula Sood	2,889	68.8
Independent	Vijay Patel	673	16.0
Independent	Minesh Patel	608	14.5
Conservative	Veronica Bailey	404	9.6
Conservative	Richard Coombes	369	8.8
Independent	Jayantilal Chauhan	250	6.0
Independent	Dalubhai Chauhan	217	5.2
Turnout		4198	
Labour win (new seat)			
Labour win (new seat)			

=== New Parks (3) ===
New Parks
Party	Candidate	Votes	%
Labour	John Blackmore	1,065	43.0
Liberal Democrats	Patricia Beck	1,054	42.5
Labour	Stephen Corrall	1,007	40.6
Labour	Brian Roberts	987	39.8
Liberal Democrats	Paul Setterfield	972	39.2
Liberal Democrats	Patrick McHugh	935	37.7
Conservative	Jane Smith	495	20.0
Conservative	Robert Taylor	486	19.6
Conservative	Graham Tobin	433	17.5
Turnout		2478	
Labour win (new seat)			
Liberal Democrats win (new seat)			
Labour win (new seat)			

=== Rushey Mead (3) ===
Rushey Mead
Party	Candidate	Votes	%
Labour	Culdipp Bhatti	2,091	50.3
Labour	Winston Nurse	1,907	45.9
Labour	Ross Willmott	1,808	43.5
Conservative	Paul Johnson	843	20.3
Liberal Democrats	Sumeer Kalyani	826	19.9
Liberal Democrats	Jorawar Bhoot	800	19.2
Conservative	Andrew Newton	784	18.9
Conservative	Shirley Russell	784	18.9
Liberal Democrats	Mohanlal Raghav	748	18.0
Socialist Labour	Chimanbhai Patel	556	13.4
Socialist Labour	Sital Gill	525	12.6
Socialist Labour	David Roberts	319	7.7
Green	Neil Foley	164	3.9
Green	Mark Simpson	160	3.8
Green	Barry Pettitt	156	3.8
Turnout		4157	
Labour win (new seat)			
Labour win (new seat)			
Labour win (new seat)			

=== Spinney Hills (3) ===
Spinney Hills
Party	Candidate	Votes	%
Liberal Democrats	Mustafa Karim	3,543	54.8
Liberal Democrats	Mussa Saleh	3,381	52.3
Liberal Democrats	Hashin Panchbhaya	3,305	51.1
Labour	Mohammed Nasim	2,333	36.1
Labour	Peter Soulsby	2,284	35.3
Labour	Malik Salim	2,280	35.3
Conservative	Jitesh Dave	596	9.2
Conservative	Daniel Grimley	520	8.0
Conservative	Anthony Smith	490	7.6
Green	Christopher Davies	259	4.0
Green	Alan Stocker	206	3.2
Green	Anthony Walker	197	3.0
Turnout		6465	
Liberal Democrats win (new seat)			
Liberal Democrats win (new seat)			
Liberal Democrats win (new seat)			

=== Stoneygate (3) ===
Stoneygate
Party	Candidate	Votes	%
Liberal Democrats	Parmjit Singh Gill	2,388	49.2
Liberal Democrats	Robert Renold	2,283	47.0
Liberal Democrats	Hussein Suleman	2,265	46.6
Labour	Karey Hunter	1,616	33.3
Labour	Mustafa Kamal	1,520	31.3
Labour	Ned Newitt	1,518	31.3
Conservative	Manjit Sangha	841	17.3
Conservative	Tarun Verma	715	14.7
Conservative	Ubaid Mukri	578	11.9
Green	Jill Cunningham	337	6.9
Green	Matthew Follett	271	5.6
Green	Stephen Wylie	238	4.9
Turnout		4857	
Liberal Democrats win (new seat)			
Liberal Democrats win (new seat)			
Liberal Democrats win (new seat)			

=== Thurncourt (2) ===
Thurncourt
Party	Candidate	Votes	%
Conservative	John Allen	1,508	59.9
Conservative	Brenda Maw	1,296	51.5
Labour	Paul Newcombe	678	26.9
Labour	Gregory Nicolle-Anderiesz	559	22.2
BNP	Clive Potter	424	16.9
Independent	Maurice Williams	255	10.1
Green	Jane Elisita	177	7.0
Green	Murray Frankland	135	5.4
Turnout		2516	
Conservative win (new seat)			
Conservative win (new seat)			

=== Westcotes (2) ===
Westcotes
Party	Candidate	Votes	%
Labour	Andrew Connelly	631	42.8
Liberal Democrats	Mae James	599	40.6
Labour	Nigel Holden	597	40.4
Liberal Democrats	Andrew Tessier	535	36.2
Conservative	Clifford Bedford	192	13.0
Conservative	Leslie Downing	187	12.7
No War Protest Vote	Valerie Smalley	113	7.7
No War Protest Vote	Greta Smalley	97	6.6
Turnout		1476	
Labour win (new seat)			
Liberal Democrats win (new seat)			

=== Western Park (2) ===
Western Park
Party	Candidate	Votes	%
Liberal Democrats	Roger Blackmore	1,389	49.2
Liberal Democrats	Peter Coley	1,349	47.8
Labour	Janet Easingwood	649	23.0
Conservative	Alistair Dixon	624	22.1
Conservative	Kelvin Johnson	615	21.8
Labour	Malcolm Unsworth	569	20.1
Green	Mark Aspey	250	8.9
Green	Christopher Seal	202	7.2
Turnout		2824	
Liberal Democrats win (new seat)			
Liberal Democrats win (new seat)			
