= 2007 Leicester City Council election =

2007 English local election

Results of the 2007 Leicester City Council election

The 2007 Leicester City Council election took place on 3 May 2007 to elect members of Leicester City Council in England. This was on the same day as other local elections.

== Summary ==
2007 Leicester City Council election
Party	Seats	Gains	Losses	Net gain/loss	Seats %	Votes %	Votes	+/−
Labour	38			▲19	70.4	42.2	81,142	+6.2
Conservative	8			▼1	14.8	18.8	36,160	–3.7
Liberal Democrats	6			▼19	11.1	23.6	45,393	–9.2
Green	2			▲1	3.7	6.2	11,865	+1.3
Independent	0			Steady	0.0	2.5	4,829	+0.2
Liberal	0			Steady	0.0	2.3	4,329	N/A
BNP	0			Steady	0.0	1.6	3,159	+1.1
UKIP	0			Steady	0.0	0.8	1,520	N/A
Respect	0			Steady	0.0	0.6	1,229	N/A
Socialist Labour	0			Steady	0.0	0.5	978	–0.4
English Democrat	0			Steady	0.0	0.5	884	N/A
Unity	0			Steady	0.0	0.3	602	N/A
Socialist Alternative	0			Steady	0.0	0.1	184	±0.0

== Results by Ward (A-Z) ==
Source:
