= 2019 Leicester City Council election =

- 2 May 2019

All 54 seats to Leicester City Council 28 seats needed for a majority
- Turnout: 35.7%
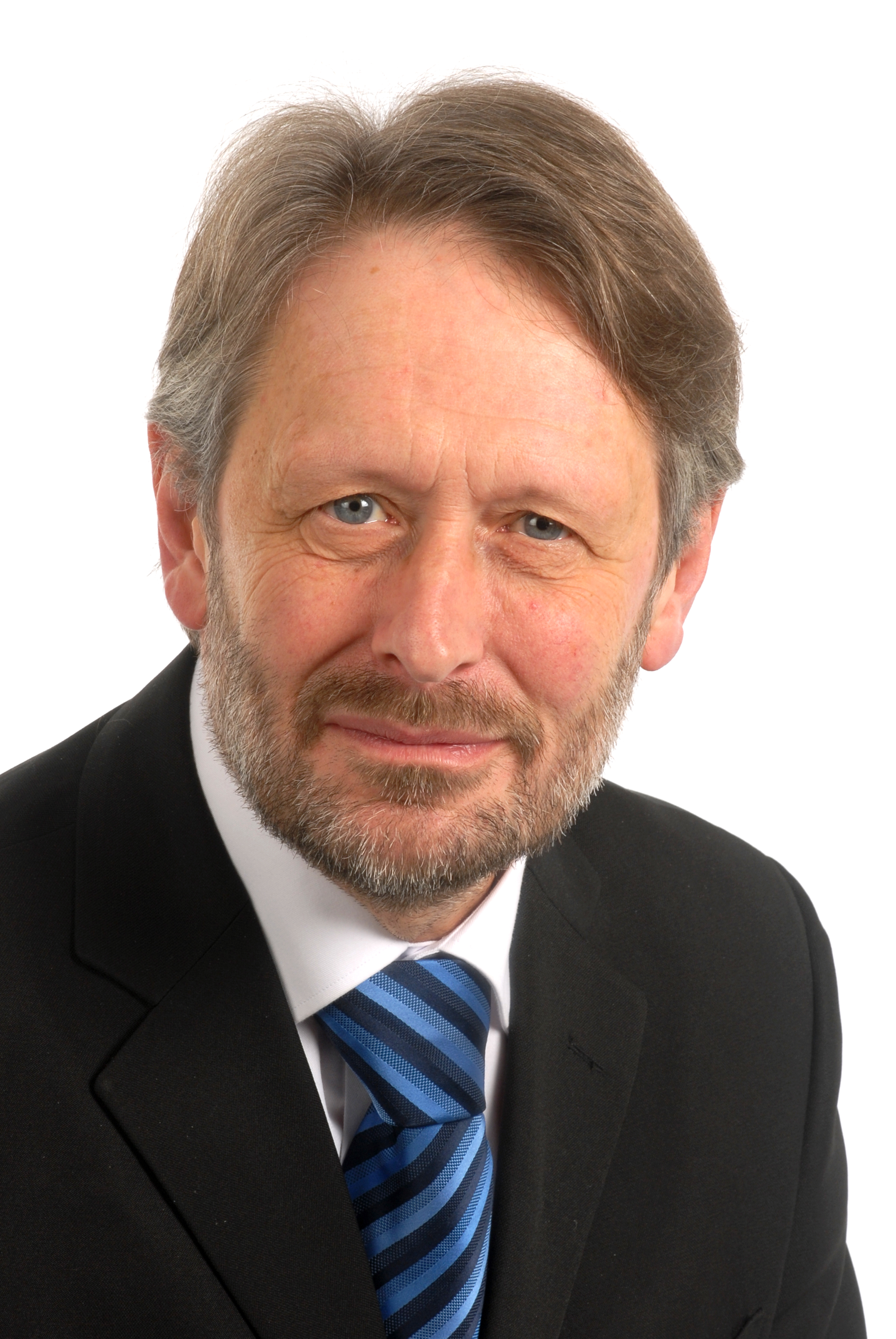

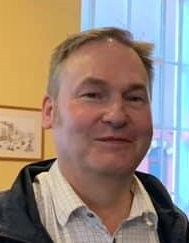
	First party	Second party	Third party
Leader	Sir Peter Soulsby	Nigel Porter	Ross Grant
Party	Labour	Liberal Democrats	Conservative
Leader's seat	Did not stand (Note: Peter Soulsby was the incumbent Labour Mayor, running for third term.)	Aylestone (Note: Also contested Mayoral Election)	Knighton (defeated) (Note: Ross Grant was the sole Conservative Councilor in the 2015-19 Leicester City Council, the Mayoral Candidate was Baroness Sandip Verma)
Seats won	53	1	0
Seat change	▲1	Steady	▼1
Popular vote	126,569	10,682	37,495
Percentage	64.5%	5.4%	19.1%
Swing	▲9.5%	▼1.1%	▲1.5%
- Winner of each seat at the 2019 Leicester City Council election
Council control before election
Labour
Council control
Labour

The 2019 Leicester City Council election took place on 2 May 2019 to elect all fifty-four members of the Leicester City Council in England. This was on the same day as other local elections, and the election for the directly elected Mayor of Leicester.

== Summary ==
=== Election result ===
2019 Leicester City Council election
Party	Candidates	Seats	Gains	Losses	Net gain/loss	Seats %	Votes %	Votes	+/−
Labour	54	53	1	0	▲1	98.1	64.5	126,569	+9.5
Liberal Democrats	28	1	0	0	Steady	1.9	5.4	10,682	–1.1
Conservative	54	0	0	1	▼1	0.0	19.1	37,495	+1.5
Green	27	0	0	0	Steady	0.0	6.2	12,129	–0.9
UKIP	22	0	0	0	Steady	0.0	3.6	7,104	–8.4
Socialist Alternative	10	0	0	0	Steady	0.0	0.6	1,237	+0.4
Independent	3	0	0	0	Steady	0.0	0.4	719	–1.3
The New United Kingdom Voters Alliance	2	0	0	0	Steady	0.0	0.1	183	N/A

== Ward results ==
=== Abbey (3) ===
Abbey
Party	Candidate	Votes	%	±%
Labour	Annette Dawn Byrne	2,124	56.0	
Labour	Vijay Singh Riyait	1,784	47.0	
Labour	Manjit Kaur Saini	1,767	46.6	
Conservative	David Haslett (Note: David Haslett was expelled from the Conservative Party after close of nominations after racist and homophobic social media posts were discovered.)	599	15.8	
Conservative	Lakhwinder Singh	521	13.7	
Green	Melanie Elizabeth Gould	496	13.1	
Conservative	Anjoom Iftikhar Maniar	457	12.0	
UKIP	Paul Gerald Edwards	451	11.9	
UKIP	Susan Shelley	428	11.3	
UKIP	Pete Stone	379	10.0	
Green	Michael Jeffrey Sackin	337	8.9	
Liberal Democrats	Paul Edwin Smith	281	7.4	
Majority		1,168	30.8	+8.8
Registered electors		13,883		
Turnout		3,793	27.62	
Rejected ballots		42	1.1	
Labour hold				
Labour hold				
Labour hold				

=== Aylestone (2) ===
Aylestone
Party	Candidate	Votes	%	±%
Liberal Democrats	Nigel Porter	972	34.6	
Labour	Adam Clarke	923	32.9	
Liberal Democrats	Scott Kennedy-Lount	667	23.8	
Labour	Su Strange	545	19.4	
Conservative	Mukesh Basra	495	17.6	
Conservative	Barry Elliot	486	17.3	
Green	Alexandra Goodwin	281	10.0	
UKIP	Rambhaben Dave	196	7.0	
UKIP	Joanne Hassell	214	7.6	
Green	Andrew Reeves	183	6.5	
Socialist Alternative	Stephen Score	77	2.7	
Majority		256	9.1	
Registered electors		8,745		
Turnout		2,807	32.29	
Rejected ballots		17	0.6	
Liberal Democrats hold				
Labour hold				

=== Beaumont Leys (3) ===
Beaumont Leys
Party	Candidate	Votes	%	±%
Labour	Paul Westley	1,579	48.1	
Labour	Vi Dempster	1,563	47.7	
Labour	Hemant Bhatia	1,563	47.7	
Conservative	Suzanne Burnside	663	20.2	
Conservative	Sameer Dilipkumar Thanki	558	17.0	
Conservative	Praful Ladwa	554	16.9	
Green	Rob Reeves	289	8.8	
Green	Stephen Massey	340	10.4	
UKIP	Carol Young	335	10.2	
UKIP	Tracey Greeves	309	9.4	
UKIP	Shane Durrant	303	9.2	
Liberal Democrats	Gary Hunt	253	7.7	
Socialist Alternative	Alex Morgan	102	3.1	
Majority		900	27.4	
Registered electors		12,839		
Turnout		3,280	25.79	
Rejected ballots		31	0.9	
Labour hold				
Labour hold				
Labour hold				

=== Belgrave (3) ===
Belgrave
Party	Candidate	Votes	%	±%
Labour	Padmini Chamund	5,872	73.4	
Labour	Nita Solanki	5,383	67.3	
Labour	Mahendra Mohanbhai Valand	4,707	58.9	
Conservative	Ramesh Pamsi Bhulabhai	1,205	15.1	
Conservative	Devi Prakashveer Singh	951	11.9	
Conservative	Jagtar Singh	842	10.5	
Green	Mags Lewis	497	6.2	
Independent	Sanjay Prem Gogia	324	4.1	
Liberal Democrats	Asit Sodha	293	3.7	
Independent	Khandubhai Vanmalibhai Patel	211	2.6	
Majority		3,502	43.8	
Registered electors		14,507		
Turnout		7,995	55.95	
Rejected ballots		121	1.5	
Labour hold				
Labour hold				
Labour hold				

=== Braunstone Park & Rowley Fields (3) ===
Braunstone Park & Rowley Fields
Party	Candidate	Votes	%	±%
Labour	Elaine Halford	1,622	47.9	
Labour	Susan Barton	1,602	47.3	
Labour	Kulwinder Singh Johal	1,553	45.9	
Green	Christopher Williams	604	17.8	
UKIP	Victoria Young	525	15.5	
UKIP	Stuart Mobbs	455	13.4	
UKIP	Anthony Wright	454	13.4	
Conservative	Aileen Marlow	450	13.3	
Conservative	Anil Verma	432	12.8	
Conservative	Somayya Sheth	377	11.1	
Liberal Democrats	Ian Bradwell	373	11.0	
Socialist Alternative	Tessa Warrington	175	5.2	
Majority		949	28.0	
Registered electors		14,410		
Turnout		3,387	23.68	
Rejected ballots		26	0.8	
Labour hold				
Labour hold				
Labour hold				

=== Castle (3) ===
Castle
Party	Candidate	Votes	%	±%
Labour	Danny Myers	1,678	57.0	
Labour	Patrick Joseph Kitterick	1,575	53.5	
Labour	Deborah Anne Sangster	1,392	47.3	
Green	Jill Fisher	1,285	43.6	
Liberal Democrats	Hannah Louise Grafton Waters	583	19.8	
Conservative	Sebastian William Riley	392	13.3	
Conservative	Rowan William Salmon	325	11.0	
Conservative	Tom Guyton-Day	314	10.7	
Majority		107	3.6	
Registered electors		9,678		
Turnout		2,944	30.92	
Rejected ballots		48	1.6	
Labour hold				
Labour hold				
Labour hold				

=== Evington (3) ===
Evington
Party	Candidate	Votes	%	±%
Labour	Deepak Bajaj	2,590	56.6	
Labour	Sue Hunter	2,409	52.6	
Labour	Ratilal Bhagwan Govind	2,254	49.2	
Conservative	Richard Coombes	1,029	22.5	
Conservative	Charulata Natver Chauhan	959	20.9	
Conservative	Suraya Ahmed Yasin	819	17.9	
Green	Ursula Bilson	579	12.6	
Liberal Democrats	Thomas Neville Hunnings	390	8.5	
Socialist Alternative	Satinder Singh Toor	191	4.2	
Socialist Alternative	Caroline Vincent	146	3.2	
Majority		1,225	26.8	
Registered electors		12,876		
Turnout		4,578	35.99	
Rejected ballots		57	1.2	
Labour hold				
Labour hold				
Labour hold				

=== Eyres Monsell (2) ===
Eyres Monsell
Party	Candidate	Votes	%	±%
Labour	Elaine Pantling	741	44.1	
Labour	Karen Pickering	641	38.1	
UKIP	Andrew Greaves	328	19.5	
UKIP	Dennis Wright	294	17.5	
Conservative	Oliver Down	209	12.4	
Conservative	Tony Yates	192	11.4	
Green	Sarah Read	144	8.6	
Liberal Democrats	Benedict Rogers	137	8.1	
Liberal Democrats	Zelda Rubinstein	116	6.9	
Green	Zina Zelter	92	5.5	
Majority		313	18.6	
Registered electors		8,284		
Turnout		1,682	20.47	
Rejected ballots		14	0.8	
Labour hold				
Labour hold				

=== Fosse (2) ===
Fosse
Party	Candidate	Votes	%	±%
Labour	Ted Cassidy	1,096	44.9	
Labour	Sue Waddington	1,067	43.7	
Green	Geoff Forse	455	18.6	
Conservative	Dave King	389	15.9	
Liberal Democrats	Chris Brain	246	10.1	
UKIP	Charlie Wright	239	9.8	
Conservative	Ibrahim Gocke	224	9.2	
UKIP	Mandy Wright	215	8.8	
Independent	Paul Newcombe	184	7.5	
Majority		612	25.1	
Registered electors		9,563		
Turnout		2,442	25.89	
Rejected ballots		34	1.4	
Labour hold				
Labour hold				

=== Humberstone & Hamilton (3) ===
Humberstone & Hamilton
Party	Candidate	Votes	%	±%
Labour	Gurinder Singh Sandhu	2,095	50.7	
Labour	Ruma Ali	1,905	46.1	
Labour	John Thomas	1,895	45.9	
Conservative	Reece Romi Sanjiv Ladwa	1,128	27.3	
Conservative	Utkarsh Maheshbhai Thakkar	958	23.2	
Conservative	Leela Manoj Keshavji	903	21.9	
Green	Pam Bellinger	650	15.7	
Liberal Democrats	Philip Smith	421	10.2	
Majority		767	18.6	
Registered electors		14,340		
Turnout		4,131	29.3	
Rejected ballots		71	1.7	
Labour hold				
Labour hold				
Labour hold				

=== Knighton (3) ===
Knighton
Party	Candidate	Votes	%	±%
Labour	Lynn Valerie Moore	2,350	44.3	
Labour	Melissa Claire March	2,340	44.1	
Labour	Geoff Whittle	1,994	37.6	
Conservative	Ross Grant	1,740	32.8	
Conservative	Andy Bayford	1,443	27.2	
Conservative	Abdul Giash	1,251	23.6	
Green	Dave Dixey	1,091	20.6	
Liberal Democrats	Chris Willmott	893	16.8	
Liberal Democrats	Lewis Hastie	709	13.4	
Liberal Democrats	Nathan Gubbins	616	11.6	
Socialist Alternative	Anna-Sofia Wiking	160	3.0	
Majority		254	4.8	
Registered electors		12,627		
Turnout		5,306	42.34	
Rejected ballots		40	0.7	
Labour hold				
Labour hold				
Labour gain from Conservative				

=== North Evington (3) ===
North Evington
Party	Candidate	Votes	%	±%
Labour	Luis Fonseca	5,076	66.8	
Labour	Rashmikant Joshi	5,201	68.4	
Labour	Jean Khote	4,797	63.1	
Conservative	Sheraz Ali Durrani	1,213	16.0	
Conservative	Pamsi Rally	1,106	14.5	
Conservative	Khemraj Gohel	1,092	14.4	
Green	Hannah Wakley	418	5.5	
Liberal Democrats	Christopher Garner	353	4.6	
Majority		3,584	47.1	
Registered electors		15,173		
Turnout		7,604	50.81	
Rejected ballots		105	1.4	
Labour hold				
Labour hold				
Labour hold				

=== Rushey Mead (3) ===
Rushey Mead
Party	Candidate	Votes	%	±%
Labour	Rita Patel	4,118	63.1	
Labour	Piara Singh Clair	3,786	58.0	
Labour	Ross Willmott	3,320	50.9	
Conservative	Geeta Mahesh Karavadra	1,166	17.9	
Conservative	Sudhir Odedra	998	15.3	
Conservative	Heten Tejura	883	13.5	
Liberal Democrats	Hash Chandarana	556	8.5	
Liberal Democrats	Nitesh Pravin Dave	554	8.5	
Green	Anne Louise Scott	451	6.9	
Majority		2,154	33.0	
Registered electors		13,617		
Turnout		6,527	48.53	
Rejected ballots		81	1.2	
Labour hold				
Labour hold				
Labour hold				

=== Saffron (2) ===
Saffron
Party	Candidate	Votes	%	±%
Labour	Elly Cutkelvin	780	51.2	
Labour	Bill Shelton	641	42.1	
Green	Neil James McDermott	328	21.5	
Liberal Democrats	Ruan Hughes	184	12.1	
Conservative	Abdikayf Bashir Farah	164	10.8	
Conservative	Ali Douas	151	9.9	
Liberal Democrats	Michael Thomas Smith	127	8.3	
Socialist Alternative	Pete Bisson	114	7.5	
Majority		313	20.5	
Registered electors		7,812		
Turnout		1,524	19.88	
Rejected ballots		29	1.9	
Labour hold				
Labour hold				

=== Spinney Hills (2) ===
Spinney Hills
Party	Candidate	Votes	%	±%
Labour	Mustafa Malik	2,932	66.1	
Labour	Misbah Batool	2,847	64.2	
Conservative	Inayat Patel	944	21.3	
Conservative	Mehboob Akuji	934	21.1	
Green	Bob Ball	215	4.8	
Liberal Democrats	Brenner Munden	138	3.1	
Socialist Alternative	Drew Walton	79	1.8	
Majority		1,903	42.9	
Registered electors		9,312		
Turnout		4,436	48.14	
Rejected ballots		47	1.0	
Labour hold				
Labour hold				

=== Stoneygate (3) ===
Stoneygate
Party	Candidate	Votes	%	±%
Labour	Kirk Master	3,922	67.0	
Labour	Sharmen Rahman	3,809	65.1	
Labour	Mohammed Aminur Thalukdar	3,527	60.2	
Conservative	Mariyah Shahid	762	13.0	
Conservative	Umer Yusuf	740	12.6	
Conservative	Drew Charles	679	11.6	
Green	Chris Hughes	562	9.6	
Green	Mary Louise Savigar	481	8.2	
Liberal Democrats	Alan Fox	349	6.0	
Liberal Democrats	Roopal Shah	269	4.6	
Socialist Alternative	Franklin O'Riordan	142	2.4	
Majority		2,765	47.2	
Registered electors		13,490		
Turnout		5,854	43.96	
Rejected ballots		76	1.3	
Labour hold				
Labour hold				
Labour hold				

=== Thurncourt (2) ===
Thurncourt
Party	Candidate	Votes	%	±%
Labour	Teresa Louise Aldred	1,254	47.4	
Labour	Stephan Paul Gee	1,077	40.7	
Conservative	Jack Hickey	757	28.6	
Conservative	Mikey Johnny Halford	721	27.2	
UKIP	Joseph Peter Shelley	204	7.7	
Green	Anna Broszkiewicz	180	6.8	
UKIP	Wayne Eason	161	6.1	
Liberal Democrats	Paul Martin Joseph Taylor	117	4.4	
The New United Kingdom Voters Alliance	Amy Morgan	95	3.6	
The New United Kingdom Voters Alliance	Ian Michael Fox	88	3.3	
Socialist Alternative	Darren Baxter	51	1.9	
Majority		320	12.1	
Registered electors		8,356		
Turnout		2,647	31.99	
Rejected ballots		26	1.0	
Labour hold				
Labour hold				

=== Troon (2) ===
Troon
Party	Candidate	Votes	%	±%
Labour	Di Cank	1,768	54.5	
Labour	Ashiedu Joel	1,516	46.7	
Conservative	Jayesh Vinod Mistry	685	21.1	
Conservative	Dipak Gohil	606	18.7	
Green	Naomi Jane Diamond	356	11.0	
Liberal Democrats	Radhika Dave	269	8.3	
Majority		831	25.6	
Registered electors		10,148		
Turnout		3,245	32.45	
Rejected ballots		48	1.5	
Labour hold				
Labour hold				

=== Westcotes (2) ===
Westcotes
Party	Candidate	Votes	%	±%
Labour	Jacky Nangreave	1,144	52.4	
Labour	Sarah Russell	1,082	49.6	
Green	Liz Sahu	473	21.7	
Conservative	Badron Chowdhury	335	15.4	
Liberal Democrats	Ildiko Gyory	229	10.5	
Conservative	Ndumiso Nsingo	192	8.8	
UKIP	Mahesh Patel	136	6.2	
UKIP	Hetalben Premgi	103	4.7	
Majority		609	27.9	
Registered electors		8,716		
Turnout		2,182	25.25	
Rejected ballots		19	0.9	
Labour hold				
Labour hold				

=== Western (3) ===
Western
Party	Candidate	Votes	%	±%
Labour	Orlanzo George Cole	1,646	45.9	
Labour	Gary O'Donnell	1,542	43.0	
Labour	Lindsay Petya Broadwell	1,494	41.7	
Conservative	Thomas George Broome	659	18.4	
Conservative	Rhys Elliott Brown	607	16.9	
Green	Christopher Davies	603	16.8	
Green	Marie Lefebvre	549	15.3	
Conservative	Eric Antoni Major	519	14.5	
UKIP	Gregg Young	511	14.2	
UKIP	Stuart Young	475	13.2	
Liberal Democrats	Chris Sidwell-Smith	430	12.0	
UKIP	Jitesh Dave	389	10.8	
Majority		835	23.3	
Registered electors		14,475		
Turnout		3,586	24.96	
Rejected ballots		27	0.7	
Labour hold				
Labour hold				
Labour hold				

=== Wycliffe (2) ===
Wycliffe
Party	Candidate	Votes	%	±%
Labour	Hanif Aqbany	4,539	81.5	
Labour	Mohammed Dawood	4,142	74.4	
Conservative	Abdul Rashid Master	372	6.7	
Conservative	Abdulrahim Bhagat	345	6.2	
Green	Aasiya Gulamohammed Bora	190	3.4	
Liberal Democrats	William Peter Tench	157	2.8	
Majority		3,770	67.7	
Registered electors		9,747		
Turnout		5,566	57.78	
Rejected ballots		66	1.2	
Labour hold				
Labour hold				

== Changes 2019–2023 ==
- Evington councillor Deepak Bajaj, a former Lord Mayor of Leicester, left the Labour Party and joined the Conservatives in September 2022, citing what he called a "complete failure of democratic processes" within the local Labour group.
- Humberstone and Hamilton councillor Daniel Crewe, the council's only Conservative member, resigned from the party later the same month over the government's September 2022 mini-budget and continued to sit as an independent.

=== By-elections ===
==== North Evington (May 2021) ====
North Evington: 6 May 2021
Party	Candidate	Votes	%	±%
Labour	Vandevi Pandya	3,306	47.2	−36.4
Conservative	Abdul Razak Osman	2,565	36.6	+16.6
Green	Aasiya Bora	241	3.4	−3.5
Liberal Democrats	Asit Sodha	240	3.4	−2.4
TUSC	Kumaran Bose	117	1.6	
Reform	Raj Solanki	89	1.3	
For Britain	David Haslett	69	1	
Independent	Charnjit Singh Sagoo	61	0.9	
Communist	Andrea Burford	33	0.5	
Majority		741	10.6	−36.5
Turnout		7,004	45	
Labour hold		Swing		

This by-election was called after the death of Labour councillor Jean Khote, whose term of office ended on 13 February 2020; the vote itself was delayed over a year by the nationwide postponement of the May 2020 local elections due to the COVID-19 pandemic.

==== Humberstone and Hamilton (July 2021) ====
Humberstone and Hamilton: 22 July 2021
Party	Candidate	Votes	%	±%
Conservative	Daniel Crewe	1,062	44.7	+18.4
Labour	Abdul Jaleel Abdul Ghafoor	790	33.2	−15.6
Liberal Democrats	Bicram Athwal	262	11.0	+1.2
Green	Pam Bellinger	190	8.0	−7.1
For Britain	David Haslett	37	1.6	New
Reform	Raj Solanki	37	1.6	New
Majority		272	11.5	N/A
Turnout		2,396	16.7	
Conservative gain from Labour		Swing	▲17.0	

The seat fell vacant following the death of Labour councillor John Thomas, a former Lord Mayor of Leicester, shortly before May 2021.

==== Evington (February 2022) ====
Evington By-election 3 February 2022
Party	Candidate	Votes	%	±%
Labour	Shahid Ullah Khan	1,557	38.8	−20.8
Conservative	Jenny Joannuo	1,382	34.4	+11.9
Liberal Democrats	Zuffar Haq	830	20.7	+12.2
Green	Ursula Bilson	200	5.0	−7.6
For Britain	David George	45	1.1	+1.1
Majority		175	4.4	−22.4
Turnout		4,014	30.7	−5.3
Labour hold		Swing	▼16.4	

Labour councillor Ratilal Govind died of cancer on 2 December 2021, prompting this by-election.

==== North Evington (October 2022) ====
North Evington By-election 13 October 2022
Party	Candidate	Votes	%	±%
Conservative	Sanjay Modhwadia	3,441	49.6	▲32.7%
Green	Aasiya Bora	1,790	25.8	▲20.0%
Labour	Rajul Tejura	1,563	22.5	▼49.8%
Liberal Democrats	Jitesh Dave	100	1.4	▼3.5%
TUSC	Tessa Warrington	45	0.6	▼1%
Majority		1,651	23.8	
Turnout		6,943	44.9	▼0.1
Conservative gain from Labour		Swing	41.3%	

This by-election followed the resignation of Labour councillor Vandevi Pandya in August 2022 — herself the winner of the ward's earlier May 2021 by-election.
