= 2011 Leicester City Council election =

Local election in Leicester

- 5 May 2011

All 54 seats to Leicester City Council 27 seats needed for a majority
| | First party | Second party |
|---|---|---|
| Party | Labour | Conservative |
| Seats won | 52 | 1 |
| Seat change | +14 | -7 |
| | Third party |
| Party | Liberal Democrats |
| Seats won | 1 |
| Seat change | -5 |
- Winner of each seat at the 2011 Leicester City Council election
Council control before election
Labour
Council control
Labour

The 2011 Leicester City Council election took place on 5 May 2011 to elect members of Leicester City Council in England. This was on the same day as other local elections and the first election for the directly elected Mayor of Leicester.

== Election result ==
The 54 councillors are elected from 27 wards, each electing either 2 or 3 councillors. The results of the election were that 52 Labour councillors were elected, with 1 Conservative and 1 Liberal Democrat. Labour gained from the Conservatives, Liberal Democrats and Greens, the latter of which lost both of their remaining seats.

Leicester City Council local election result 2011
| Party | Seats | Gains | Losses | Net gain/loss | Seats % | Votes % | Votes | +/− |
|---|---|---|---|---|---|---|---|---|
| Labour | 52 | 14 | 0 | +14 | 96.0 | 55.2 | 49,761 | |
| Conservative | 1 | 0 | 7 | -7 | 2.0 | 19.7 | 17,727 | |
| Liberal Democrats | 1 | 1 | 6 | -5 | 2.0 | 13.7 | 12,352 | |
| Green | 0 | 0 | 2 | -2 | 0.0 | 4.4 | 3,967 | |
| UKIP | 0 | 0 | 0 | 0 | 0.0 | 1.7 | 1,557 | |
| Independent | 0 | 0 | 0 | 0 | 0.0 | 1.7 | 1,530 | |
| TUSC | 0 | 0 | 0 | 0 | 0.0 | 1.2 | 1,102 | |
| Liberal | 0 | 0 | 0 | 0 | 0.0 | 1.0 | 888 | |
| English Democrat | 0 | 0 | 0 | 0 | 0.0 | 0.5 | 442 | |
| Unity for Peace and Socialism | 0 | 0 | 0 | 0 | 0.0 | 0.5 | 434 | |
| English People's Party | 0 | 0 | 0 | 0 | 0.0 | 0.4 | 354 | |

== See also ==
- Leicester City Council elections
