= Drama Desk Award for Outstanding Director =

American theatre award

- Awarded for: Outstanding Director
- Location: New York City
- Country: United States
- Presented by: Drama Desk
- First award: 1955
- Final award: 1974
- Website: dramadesk.org (defunct)

The Drama Desk Award for Outstanding Director was introduced in 1955 to honor directors, with no distinction between work in plays or musicals. From 1968, multiple awards were presented for each season. In 1975 the category was retired and replaced by two awards: Drama Desk Award for Outstanding Director of a Play and Drama Desk Award for Outstanding Director of a Musical.

== Award winners ==
Key

and bold indicates the winner.

Year	Designer	Production	Ref.
**1955**	**Jack Landau**	**The Clandestine Marriage / The White Devil**	
**1956**	**José Quintero**	**The Iceman Cometh**	
**1957-1958**	N/A		
**1959**	**William Ball**	**Ivanov**	

=== 1960s ===
Year	Designer	Production	Ref.
1960-1964	N/A		
1965	**Ulu Grosbard**	A View from the Bridge	
1966	N/A		
1967	**Joseph Hardy**	You're a Good Man, Charlie Brown	
1968	**Robert Moore**	The Boys in the Band	
1968	**Tom O'Horgan**	Tom Paine	
1969	**Tom O'Horgan**	Futz	
1969	**Neal Kenyon**	Dames at Sea	
1969	**Alan Arkin**	Little Murders	
1969	**Michael Schultz**	Does a Tiger Wear a Necktie?	
1969	**Gordon Davidson**	In the Matter of J. Robert Oppenheimer	
1969	**Edwin Sherin**	The Great White Hope	

=== 1970s ===
Year	Designer	Production	Ref.
1970	Jerzy Grotowski	**The Apocalypse**	
1970	Alan Arkin	**The White House Murder Case**	
1970	Ron Field	**Applause**	
1970	Joseph Hardy	**Child's Play**	
1970	Harold Prince	**Company**	
1971	Robert Wilson	**Deafman Glance**	
1971	Andre Gregory	**Alice in Wonderland**	
1971	Peter Brook	**A Midsummer Night's Dream**	
1971	Michael Bennett and Harold Prince	**Follies**	
1971	Tom O'Horgan	**Lenny**	
1971	Paul Sills	**Ovid's Metamorphoses** and **Paul Sills' Story Theatre**	
1972	Mel Shapiro	**Older People**	
1972	Andrei Șerban	**Medea**	
1972	Peter Hall	**Old Times**	
1972	Jeff Bleckner	**Sticks and Bones**	
1972	A. J. Antoon	**That Championship Season**	
1972	Mel Shapiro	**Two Gentlemen of Verona**	
1973	Victor Garcia	**Yerma**	
1973	Joseph Chaikin and Roberta Sklar	**The Mutation Show**	
1973	Harold Prince	**A Little Night Music**	
1973	Bob Fosse	**Pippin**	
1973	Michael Rudman	**The Changing Room**	
1973	Harold Prince	**The Great God Brown**	
1974	José Quintero	**A Moon for the Misbegotten**	
1974	Harold Prince	**Candide**	
1974	Harold Prince	**The Visit**	
1974	Frank Dunlop	**[[Scapino (play}|]]**	
1974	Marvin Felix Camillo	**Short Eyes**	

== See also ==
- Drama Desk Award for Outstanding Director of a Play
- Drama Desk Award for Outstanding Director of a Musical
