= Leicester Haymarket Theatre =

Theatre in Leicester, England

Coordinates: 52.6375°N 1.1320°W

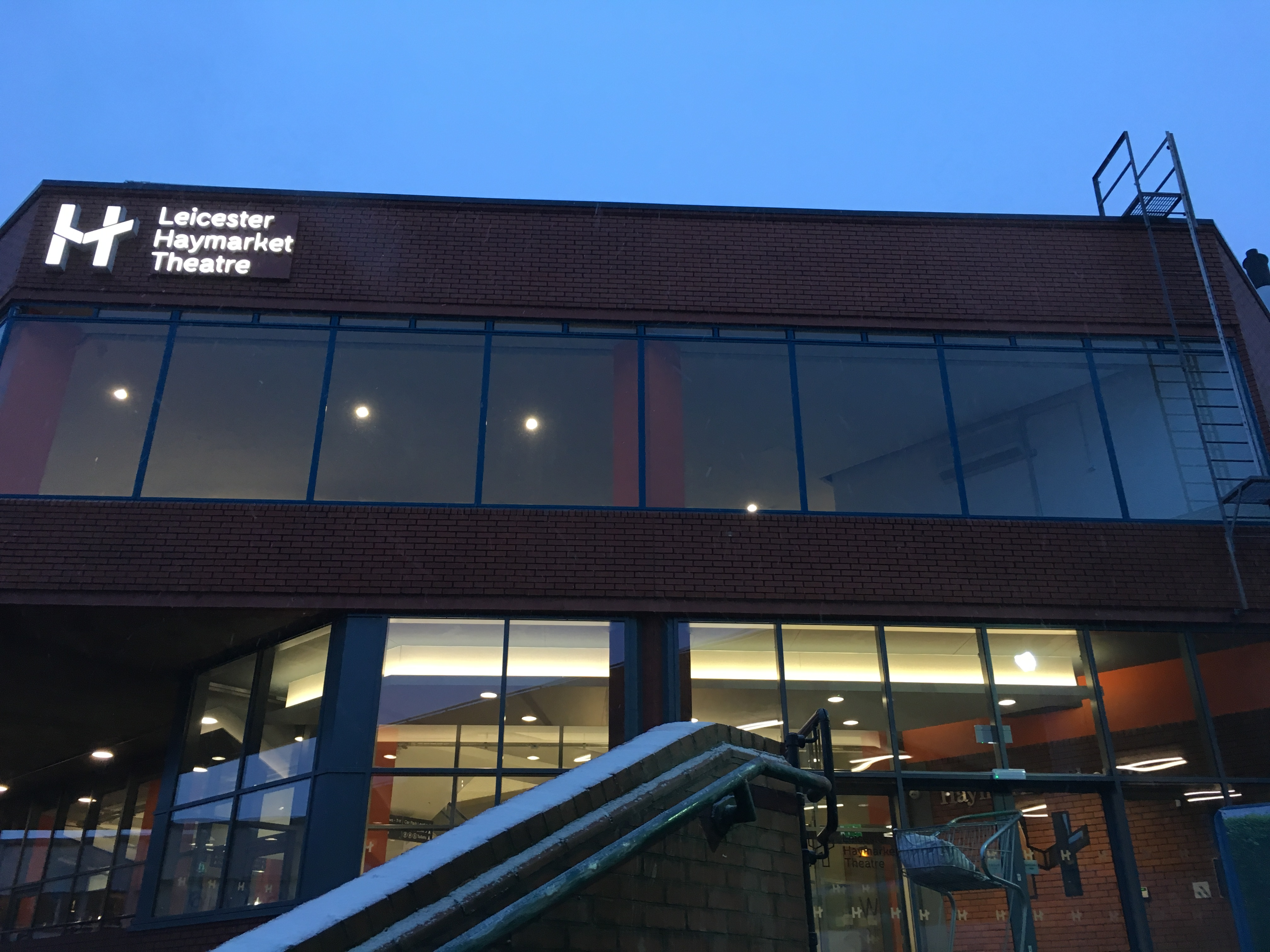
- Entrance to the Leicester Haymarket Theatre following refurbishment in 2018
- Interactive map of Leicester Haymarket Theatre
- Address: 1 Garrick Walk, Haymarket, Leicester; England
- Owner: ING Real Estate Management
- Capacity: 901 (main theatre) 120 (studio theatre)
- Current use: Performing arts centre

Construction
- Opened: 1973; 53 years ago
- Years active: 1973–2007, 2018–2020
- Architect: Building Design Partnership

The Leicester Haymarket Theatre is a theatre in Leicester, England, next to the Haymarket Shopping Centre on Belgrave Gate in Leicester City centre. It operated as a theatre (with two stages) from 1973 to 2007, and again briefly between 2017 and 2020. Since 2023 it has been a teaching and performing base for a dance school.

== History ==
The Haymarket Theatre was designed by Building Design Partnership, to supersede the small Phoenix Theatre. When first built, the auditorium sat 750 people, "built with a large London dimensioned stage, capable of staging grand Opera, or Ballet, but having too small a seating capacity to make it viable for such shows". Later a rehearsal area in the building was converted into a smaller, more intimate stage, the Studio Theatre, which sat 120 people.

The Haymarket Theatre was opened by Sir Ralph Richardson on 30 November 1973. The opening season started ahead of the official opening with The Recruiting Officer on 17 October 1973, Economic Necessity on 24 October and Cabaret on 21 November. Leicester City Council purchased a 99-year lease of the theatre in 1974.

The Haymarket's early production directors were Robin Midgley and Michael Bogdanov. The musical director was American Robert Mandell, and the Haymarket soon gained a reputation for developing and producing stage musicals, many of which transferred to the West End in London and Broadway in New York. The Haymarket mounted several musicals in collaboration with Cameron Mackintosh.

Between 1973 and 2007 the theatre was operated by The Leicester Theatre Trust. The Trust vacated the theatre in 2007 when it moved to the newly built Curve Theatre, Leicester in Leicester's Cultural Quarter. The last show held at the Haymarket by the Leicester Theatre Trust was Wizard of Oz starring Helena Blackman in 2006. The theatre was closed in 2007 and remained so for the next 10 years.

In June 2016 the management of the theatre was taken over by an organisation known as the Haymarket Consortium who undertook that it would be re-opened as a performance, training and e-sports venue. The theatre was re-opened for performances on 2 March 2017 and a formal opening ceremony took place later that year. The theatre closed again in March 2020, during the Coronavirus pandemic and entered liquidation on 22 May 2020.

In 2023 it reopened as a teaching and performing base for a dance school.

== Metal Tree sculpture ==
The Metal Tree sculpture by Hubert Dalwood, at the front of the entrance to the Haymarket Theatre, was the only major piece of abstract sculpture in the city centre for many years. It was unveiled in 1974.

== Selected productions ==
The theatre was noted for its production of musicals, some in collaboration with Cameron Mackintosh. The following are some of the productions held at the theatre. All are in the main theatre, unless noted (Studio Theatre productions).

=== 1970s ===
- 1973. The Recruiting Officer, by George Farquhar. 17 October – 10 November 1973.
- 1973. Economic Necessity, by John Hopkin, starring Anthony Bate. World premiere. 24 October – 17 November 1973.
- 1973. Cabaret, by John Kander, Fred Ebb and Joe Masteroff. 21 November – 19 December 1973.
- 1973–1974. Aladdin. Pantomime. 22 December 1973 – 19 January 1974.
- 1974. Caucasian Chalk Circle, by Bertolt Brecht, directed by Michael Bogdanov. March 1974.
- 1974. Joseph and the Amazing Technicolor Dreamcoat, by Andrew Lloyd Webber and Tim Rice, directed by Robin Midgley, starring Maynard Williams and Michael Attwell. 13 March – 20 April 1974.
- 1974. Little Lamb, by Liane Aukin, directed by Robin Midgley, starring Heather Sears and Bill Wallis. May 1974.
- 1974. Hobson's Choice, by Harold Brighouse. Ended 29 June 1974.
- 1974. Happy as a Sandbag, by Ken Lee, directed by Philip Hedley and Rhys McConnochie, starring Brian Protheroe, Lesley Duff and Darryl Kavann. Ended 17 August 1974.
- 1974. Leave Him to Heaven, by Ken Lee, directed by Philip Hedley and Rhys McConnochie, starring Brian Protheroe, Lesley Duff and Darryl Kavann. Ended 17 August 1974.
- 1974. Joseph and the Amazing Technicolor Dreamcoat, by Andrew Lloyd Webber and Tim Rice, directed by Robin Midgley, starring Ben Cross, Maynard Williams and Michael Attwell. 22 August – 14 September 1974.
- 1974. Equus, by Peter Shaffer, directed by Robin Midgley, starring Ben Cross and Carmen Silvera. 25 September – 12 October 1974.
- 1974. How the Other Half Loves, by Alan Ayckbourn. Ended 16 November 1974.
- 1974. Irma La Douce, by Marguerite Monnot, Julian More, David Heneker and Monty Norman, directed by Robin Midgley and Peter Reeves, starring Ben Cross and Penelope Nice. 20 November – 14 December 1974.
- 1974. Romeo and Juliet, by William Shakespeare, directed by Michael Bogdanov, starring Alan Rickman, Mary Rutherford, Bill Wallis and Jonathan Kent.
- 1974. Mind Your Head, by Adrian Mitchell, starring Ben Cross.
- 1974–1975. Dick Whittington. Pantomime, by Anthony Cornish and Christopher Tookey, directed by Anthony Cornish, starring Linal Haft, Buster Skeggs and Perry Cree. 19 December 1974 – 25 January 1975.
- 1975. Joseph and the Amazing Technicolor Dreamcoat, by Andrew Lloyd Webber and Tim Rice, directed by Robin Midgley, starring Alan Rickman, Maynard Williams and David Quilter. 22 July – 30 August 1975.
- 1975. There's a Girl in My Soup, by Terence Frisby. ? – Saturday 20 September 1975.
- 1975. Guys and Dolls, by Frank Loesser, Jo Swerling and Abe Burrows, directed by Robin Midgley, starring Alan Rickman, Michael Attwell, Bill Wallis, Maynard Williams and Niki Marvin. 6 November – 12 December 1975.
- 1975–1976. Babes in the Wood. Pantomime. December 1975 – January 1976.
- 1976. The Fantasticks, by Harvey Schmidt and Tom Jones. Studio Theatre, 20 January – 7 February 1976.
- 1976. Absurd Person Singular, by Alan Ayckbourn. 21 January – 14 February 1976.
- 1976. Bloody Neighbours, by Richard Crane. Studio Theatre, 10 February – 21 February 1976.
- 1976. A Midsummer Night's Dream, by William Shakespeare, directed by Robin Midgley, starring Mia Farrow and Heather Sears. 25 February – 13 March 1976.
- 1976. Who's Afraid of Virginia Woolf?, by Edward Albee.
- 1976. Knocking on My Floor, by William Fairchild. 7 April – 24 April 1976.
- 1976. Mame, by Jerry Herman. 28 April – 8 May 1976.
- 1976. Joseph and the Amazing Technicolor Dreamcoat, by Andrew Lloyd Webber and Tim Rice.
- 1976. Sophocles: The Theban Plays (the 'Oedipus trilogy'). Oedipus Rex starring Miriam Karlin. 13 October – 6 November 1976.
- 1976. The Boy Friend, directed by Alexander Doré, starring Miriam Karlin and Elaine Paige. November 1976.
- 1976–1977. Cinderella. Pantomime. Thursday 23 December 1976 – Saturday 15 January 1977.
- 1977. Hay Fever, by Noël Coward, directed by Jan Sargent, starring Miriam Karlin, Grania Hayes and David Glover. 8 March – 2 April 1977.
- 1977. The Seagull, by Anton Chekhov, starring Miriam Karlin. April 1977.
- 1977. Cause Célèbre, by Terence Rattigan, directed by Robin Midgley, starring Glynis Johns and Helen Lindsay. World premiere. Wednesday 18 May – Saturday 18 June 1977.
- 1977. Oliver!, by Lionel Bart, directed by Robin Midgley, starring Roy Hudd. Saturday 16 July – Saturday 3 September 1977.
- 1977. Rain, by W. Somerset Maugham, adaptation by John Colton and Clemence Randolph, directed by Bob Carlton, starring Carroll Baker.
- 1977. She Stoops to Conquer, by Oliver Goldsmith, starring Paul Lavers, Heather Sears and James Hayter, 19 October – 5 November 1977.
- 1977. Camelot, by Frederick Loewe and Alan Jay Lerner. 10 November – 17 December 1977.
- 1977. A Doll's House, by Henrik Ibsen. Studio Theatres. Ended Saturday 10 December 1977.
- 1977–1978. Jack and the Beanstalk. Pantomime. Thursday 22 December 1977 – Saturday 28 January 1978.
- 1978. Crippen, by Richard Crane, directed by Hugh Wooldridge, starring Grania Hayes and Derek Beard. Studio Theatre, January 1978.
- 1978. Otherwise Engaged, by Simon Gray, directed by Jan Sargent, starring Wendy Gifford, Michael Gunn, Rosamund Shelley, Barry Justice, David Neal, Roy Macready and Bob Cartland. 3 May – 27 May 1978.
- 1978. See How They Run, by Philip King. Tuesday 6 June 1978 – ?.
- 1978. Joseph and the Amazing Technicolor Dreamcoat, by Andrew Lloyd Webber and Tim Rice, directed by Robin Midgley, starring Clive Wood and Nigel Bennett. 20 July – 2 September 1978.
- 1978. Misalliance, by George Bernard Shaw, directed by Michael Meacham, starring Clive Wood and David Timson.
- 1978–1979. My Fair Lady, by Alan Jay Lerner, Frederick Loewe and George Bernard Shaw, directed by Robin Midgley, starring Tony Britton, Liz Robertson, Peter Bayliss and Dame Anna Neagle. November 1978 – January 1979.
- 1978–1979. The Gingerbread Man, by David Wood. Studio Theatre. November 1978 – January 1979.
- 1978–1979. Mother Goose. Pantomime, directed by Alexander Doré, starring Jean Morton, Russell Henderson and Roy Macready. 21 December 1978 – ? 1979.
- 1979. One of Our Howls is Missing, by Raymond Allen, directed by Jimmy Thompson, starring Carol Hawkins and Christopher Beeny. Wednesday 25 April 1979 – ?.
- 1979. All Together Now, by Peter Buckman and Clive Swift, directed by Robin Midgley, starring Russell Henderson, Terry Molloy and Alan Starkey. 4 July – 21 July 1979.
- 1979. The Rocky Horror Show, by Richard O'Brien, directed by Jim Sharman, starring Daniel Abineri, Amanda Redman, Nicholas Courtney, Trevor Byfield and Sarah Payne. 8 August – 8 September 1979, before a national tour.
- 1979. Caste, by Thomas William Robertson, directed by Michael Meacham, starring Roger Davenport, James Hayter, Pippa Guard, Geoffrey Burridge, Pamela Lane, Bob Hewis and Joanne Pearce. 12 September 1979 – ?.
- 1979. An Early Life (part of The Glittering Prizes), by Frederic Raphael, directed by Michael Meacham, starring Geoffrey Burridge, Pippa Guard, David Cann, Roy Macready and Carmen Silvera. Ended 27 October 1979.
- 1979–1980. Oklahoma!, by Richard Rodgers and Oscar Hammerstein II, directed by James Hammerstein, starring John Diedrich, Christina Mathews, Madge Ryan, Alfred Molina, Linal Haft, Mark White, Shan Stevens and Robert Bridges. 29 November 1979 – 2 February 1980.
- 1979–1980. Nutcracker Sweet, by David Wood. 4 December 1979 – 12 January 1980.
- 1979–1980. Just a Verse and a Chorus, by and starring Roy Hudd. Studio Theatre, 19 December 1979 – 19 January 1980.

=== 1980s ===
- 1980. Funny Peculiar, by Mike Stott, directed by Robin Midgley, starring Michael Gunn, Penelope Nice, Barbara New, David Riley, Alan Starkey, Carol Cleveland, Patrick Monckton and Nigel Bennett. 13 February – 8 March 1980.
- 1980. One for the Pot, by Ray Cooney and Tony Hilton, starring Roy Hudd. May 1980.
- 1980. Godspell, by Stephen Schwartz and John-Michael Tebelak, directed by Jan Sargent. 19 July 1980 – ?.
- 1980. Once a Catholic, by Mary O'Malley, directed by Warren Hooper, starring Susan Beagley, Wendy Brierly, Christopher Brown, Joyce Fenby, Desmond Jordan, Pamela Lane and Tim McInnerny. Ended 27 September 1980.
- 1980. The Importance of Being Earnest, by Oscar Wilde, directed by Frank Hauser, starring David Downer, Isabelle Amyes, Polly Adams, Richard Easton, Margaretta Scott and Desmond Jordan. 1 October 1980 – ? (The entire production transferred to The Old Vic, London, opening 14 October 1980, so before then).
- 1980–1981. Gigi, by Alan Jay Lerner and Frederick Loewe, starring Dilys Hamlett, David Firth, Hugh Paddick and Betty Marsden. November 1980 – 17 January 1981.
- 1981. School for Scandal, by Richard Brinsley Sheridan, directed by Colin George. Wednesday 21 January 1981 – ?.
- 1981. Two Into One, by Ray Cooney, directed by Roger Redfarn, starring Jan Walters and Richard Coleman. World premiere. 19 March 1981 – ?.
- 1981. The Ghost of Daniel Lambert, by Sue Townsend, starring Perry Cree. 7 May – 11 July 1981.
- 1981. Godspell, by Stephen Schwartz and John-Michael Tebelak. June – August 1981.
- 1981. The Dresser, by Ronald Harwood, directed by Robin Lefevre, starring Joss Ackland. 3 September – 30 September 1981.
- 1981. Relatively Speaking, by Alan Ayckbourn, directed by Michael Meacham. Wednesday 28 October 1981 – ?.
- 1981–1982. Gypsy, by Jule Styne, Stephen Sondheim and Arthur Laurents, directed by Roger Redfarn, starring Fiona Fullerton and Noele Gordon. 1 December 1981 – ? 1982.
- 1982. Salad Days, by Dorothy Reynolds and Julian Slade. 21 July 1982 – ?.
- 1982. Arsenic and Old Lace, by Joseph Kesselring, directed by Warren Hooper, starring Antonia Pemberton, Pamela Cundell, Bill Thomas and Maurice Colbourne. 31 August 1982 – ?.
- 1982. South Pacific, by Richard Rodgers, Oscar Hammerstein II and Joshua Logan. 30 November 1982 – ?.
- 1983. Master Class, by David Pownall, directed by Justin Greene, starring Timothy West, David Bamber, Peter Kelly and Jonathan Adams. World premiere. 26 January – 19 February 1983.
- 1983. Hello, Dolly!, by Jerry Herman and Michael Stewart, a Leicester Amateur Operatic Society production. 11 May – 21 May 1983.
- 1983. Grease, by Jim Jacobs and Warren Casey, directed by Warren Hooper, starring Denise Welch and David Easter. 21 July – 20 August 1983.
- 1983. Ghosts, by Henrik Ibsen, directed by Michael Meacham, starring Sylvia Syms and Ron Berglas. November 1983.
- 1983. West Side Story, by Jerome Robbins, Leonard Bernstein, Stephen Sondheim and Arthur Laurents, directed by Tom Abbott. Thursday 24 November 1983 – ?.
- 1984. Passion Play, by Peter Nichols, directed by Mike Ockrent, starring Leslie Phillips, Barry Foster and Judy Parfitt. 7 March – 7 April 1984.
- 1984. The Cherry Orchard, by Anton Chekhov, directed by Nancy Meckler, starring Susan Engel, Nick Stringer and Alfred Molina. 23 May – 16 June 1984.
- 1984. The Hired Man, by Melvyn Bragg and Howard Goodall, directed by David Gilmore, starring Paul Clarkson, Julia Hills, Richard Walsh and Michael Mawby. Thursday 19 July 1984 – ?.
- 1984. Bloody Poetry, by Howard Brenton, directed by Roland Rees, starring James Aubrey, Fiona Shaw, Jane Gurnett, Valentine Pelka, William Gaminara and Sue Burton. World premiere. 1 October – 20 October 1984.
- 1984. Macbeth, by William Shakespeare, directed by Nancy Meckler, starring Bernard Hill and Julie Walters.
- 1984. Pygmalion, by George Bernard Shaw, starring Peter O'Toole, John Thaw and Jackie Smith-Wood. 18 April 1984 – ?. The production then transferred to a run at London's Shaftesbury Theatre.
- 1984. A Midsummer Night's Dream, by William Shakespeare, directed by Nancy Meckler, starring Angela Bruce, Don Warrington, Vicky Licorish, Michael Kingsbury, Souad Faress and Alex Norton. 24 October 1984 – ?.
- 1984–1985. Me and My Girl, by Noel Gay, Douglas Furber, L. Arthur Rose and Stephen Fry, directed by Mike Ockrent, starring Robert Lindsay, Emma Thompson and Frank Thornton. 23 November 1984 – 26 January 1985.
- 1984–1985. Medea, by Euripides, Studio Theatre. 5 December 1984 – 5 January 1985.
- 1985. Woyzeck, by Georg Büchner, Studio Theatre. 9 January – 2 February 1985.
- 1985. Steaming, by Nell Dunn, directed by Warren Hooper, starring John Ross and Lindy Janiec. 29 January – 16 February 1985.
- 1985. Some of my Best Friends are Husbands, by Hugh Leonard, directed by Robin Lefevre, starring Peter Bowles. 27 February – 23 March 1985.
- 1985. Joseph and the Amazing Technicolor Dreamcoat, by Andrew Lloyd Webber and Tim Rice, directed by Nancy Meckler. 28 March – 4 May 1985.
- 1985. The London Cuckolds, by Edward Ravenscroft, directed by Stuart Burge. 15 May – 1 June 1985.
- 1985. Pride and Prejudice, by David Pownall, based on the novel by Jane Austen, directed by Bill Pryde, starring Tessa Peake-Jones, Julia Deakin, Peter Sallis and Stuart Organ. 11 September 1985 – ?.
- 1985. Macbeth, by William Shakespeare, starring Bernard Hill, Julie Walters, Nick Stringer and Jeremy Swift. 24 October 1985 – ?.
- 1985–1986. The Pajama Game, by Richard Bissell, George Abbott, Richard Adler and Jerry Ross, directed by Mike Ockrent, starring Paul Jones, Fiona Hendley, and Catherine Zeta-Jones as a company member. 21 November 1985 – 25 January 1986.
- 1985–1986. The Wind in the Willows, by Carl Davis, based on the children's book by Kenneth Grahame. World premiere. 30 November 1985 – 4 January 1986.
- 1986. The Entertainer, directed by Robin Lefevre, starring Peter Bowles, Sylvia Syms and Frank Middlemass. 15 April 1986 – ?.
- 1986. One for the Road, by Willy Russell. 13 May – 31 May 1986.
- 1986. The Canterbury Tales, by Geoffrey Chaucer, adapted by Phil Woods with Michael Bogdanov, directed by Ian Watt-Smith. 22 July – 30 August 1986.
- 1986. Woza Albert!, by Percy Mtwa, Mbongeni Ngema and Barney Simon, Studio Theatre, 9 September – 4 October 1986.
- 1986. Loot, by Joe Orton, directed by Ian Forest, starring Shay Gorman.
- 1986–1987. High Society, directed by Richard Eyre, starring Trevor Eve, Natasha Richardson, Stephen Rea and Patrick Ryecart. 19 November 1986 – 31 January 1987.
- 1986–1987. Mr Men's Magic Island. 1 December 1986 – 3 January 1987.
- 1987. Kip's War. Musical. World premiere.
- 1987. Summer and Smoke, by Tennessee Williams, starring Frances Barber. 9 September – 3 October 1987.
- 1987–1988. Fat Pig, musical by Henry Krieger, starring Gary Shail. 20 November 1987 – 30 January 1988.
- 1988. Timon of Athens, by William Shakespeare, directed by Simon Usher, starring Guy Williams, Brian Bovell, Philip Brook and Anthony Douse. Studio Theatre. 11 February – 12 March 1988.
- 1988. Crimes of Passion: double bill of The Ruffian on the Stair and The Erpingham Camp, by Joe Orton, directed by Keith Boak. 16 March – 26 March 1988.
- 1988. Easter, by August Strindberg, starring Nyree Dawn Porter and Jemma Richardson. 13 – 30 April 1988.
- 1988. Julius Caesar, by William Shakespeare, directed by John Dexter, starring Stephen Boxer, Robert Flemyng, Joseph Marcell, Martin McKellan and Jacqueline Dankworth. 9 September – 5 November 1988.
- 1988. Creon, by Stephen Spender, based on the Theban Plays (the 'Oedipus trilogy') by Sophocles, directed by John Dexter, starring Joseph Marcell. World premiere. 13 October – 5 November 1988.
- 1989. Stepping Out, by Richard Harris, directed by Tim Flavin, starring Cate Fowler, Myra Sands, Tony Crean and Charlotte Avery. 2 February – 4 March 1989.
- 1989. M. Butterfly, by David Henry Hwang, directed by John Dexter, starring Sir Anthony Hopkins, Peter Egan and Lynn Farleigh. 25 March – 8 April 1989.
- 1989. The Widowing of Mrs. Holroyd, by D. H. Lawrence, directed by John Dove, starring Kevin Whately, Karen Lewis and Philip Whitchurch. 13 April – 6 May 1989.
- 1989. Dames at Sea, by George Haimsohn, Robin Miller and Jim Wise, directed by Tim Flavin, starring Bonnie Langford, Joan Savage and Teddy Green. 14 July – 26 August 1989 (scheduled run; the run was pulled early to allow Yuri Lyubimov to rehearse Hamlet on the main stage).
- 1989. Hamlet, by William Shakespeare, directed by Yuri Lyubimov, starring Daniel Webb, James Nesbitt, Martin McKellan and Lloyd Owen. September 1989 – ?.
- 1989. A Doll's House, by Henrik Ibsen, directed by Nick Ward, starring Daniel Massey.
- 1989. Kiss Me, Kate, by Cole Porter and Bella and Samuel Spewack. Production by Leicester Amateur Operatic Company.
- 1989–1990. The Murders in the Rue Morgue, by Edgar Allan Poe, directed by Simon Usher, starring Fenella Fielding. 14 December 1989 – 31 January 1990.

=== 1990s ===
- 1990. Another Love Story, by Frederick Lonsdale, directed by Edward Fox, starring Edward Fox and Jill Bennett. 19 April 1990 – ?.
- 1992. Merrily We Roll Along, by Stephen Sondheim and George Furth, directed by Paul Kerryson. 10 April – 15 April and 23 April – 9 May 1992.
- 1993. The Destiny of Me, by Larry Kramer, directed by and featuring Simon Callow.
- 1994. Calamity Jane, by James O'Hanlon, Charles K. Freeman, Ronald Hanmer, Phil Park, Sammy Fain and Paul Francis Webster, directed by Paul Kerryson, starring Louise Gold, Ricco Ross, Liz Izen, Hal Fowler, Nicole Carty, James Head, Alan Mosley, James Duke and Phillip Aiden. 18 November 1994 – ?.
- 1998–1999. Singin' in the Rain, by Betty Comden, Adolph Green, Arthur Freed and Nacio Herb Brown. 4 December 1998 – 6 February 1999.

=== 2000s ===
- 2002. On Your Toes, directed by Paul Kerryson, starring Adam Cooper, Linzi Hateley. Kathryn Evans, Marguerite Porter and Irek Mukhamedov.

== Image gallery ==
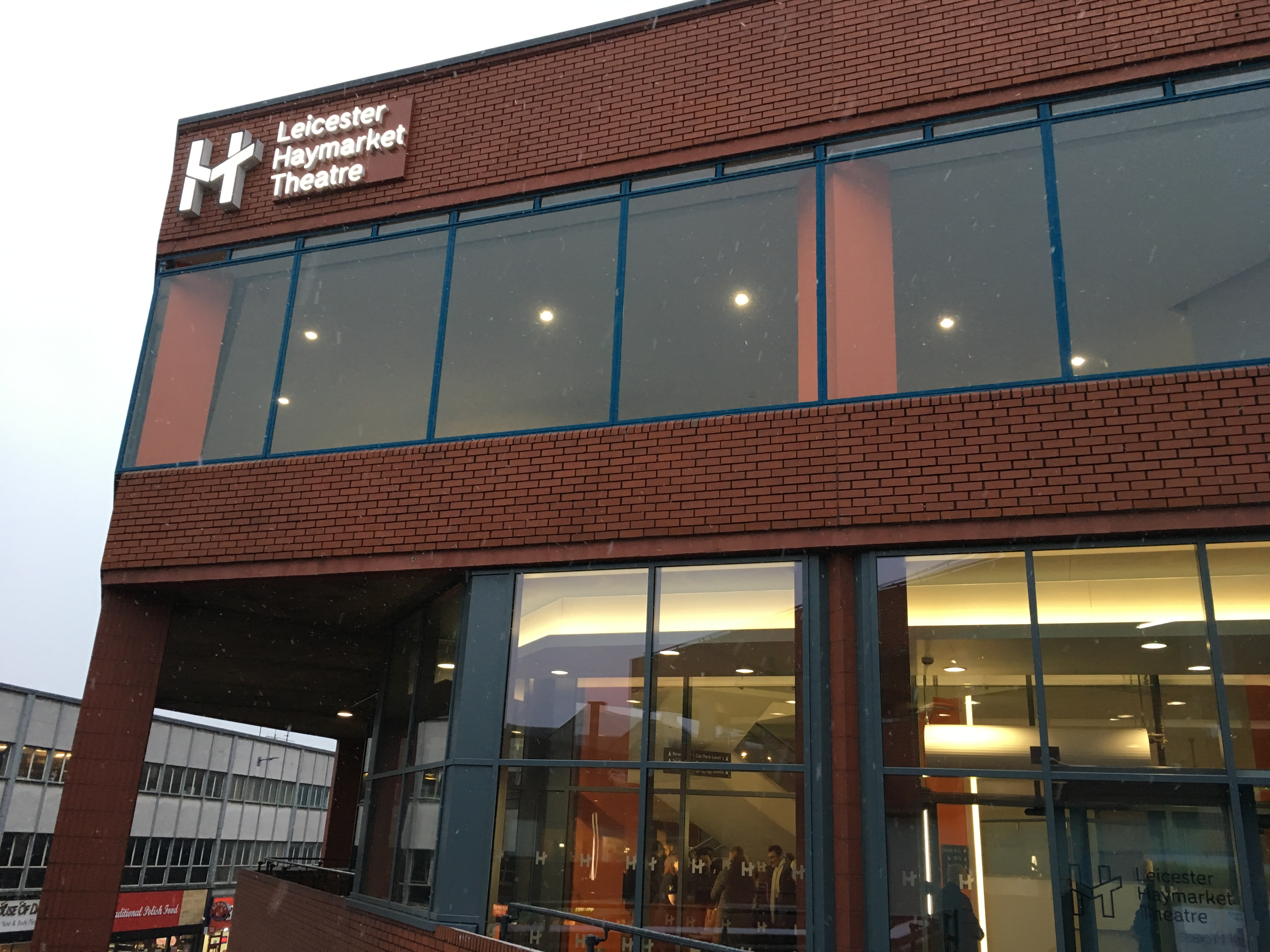
Red-brick exterior to the theatre

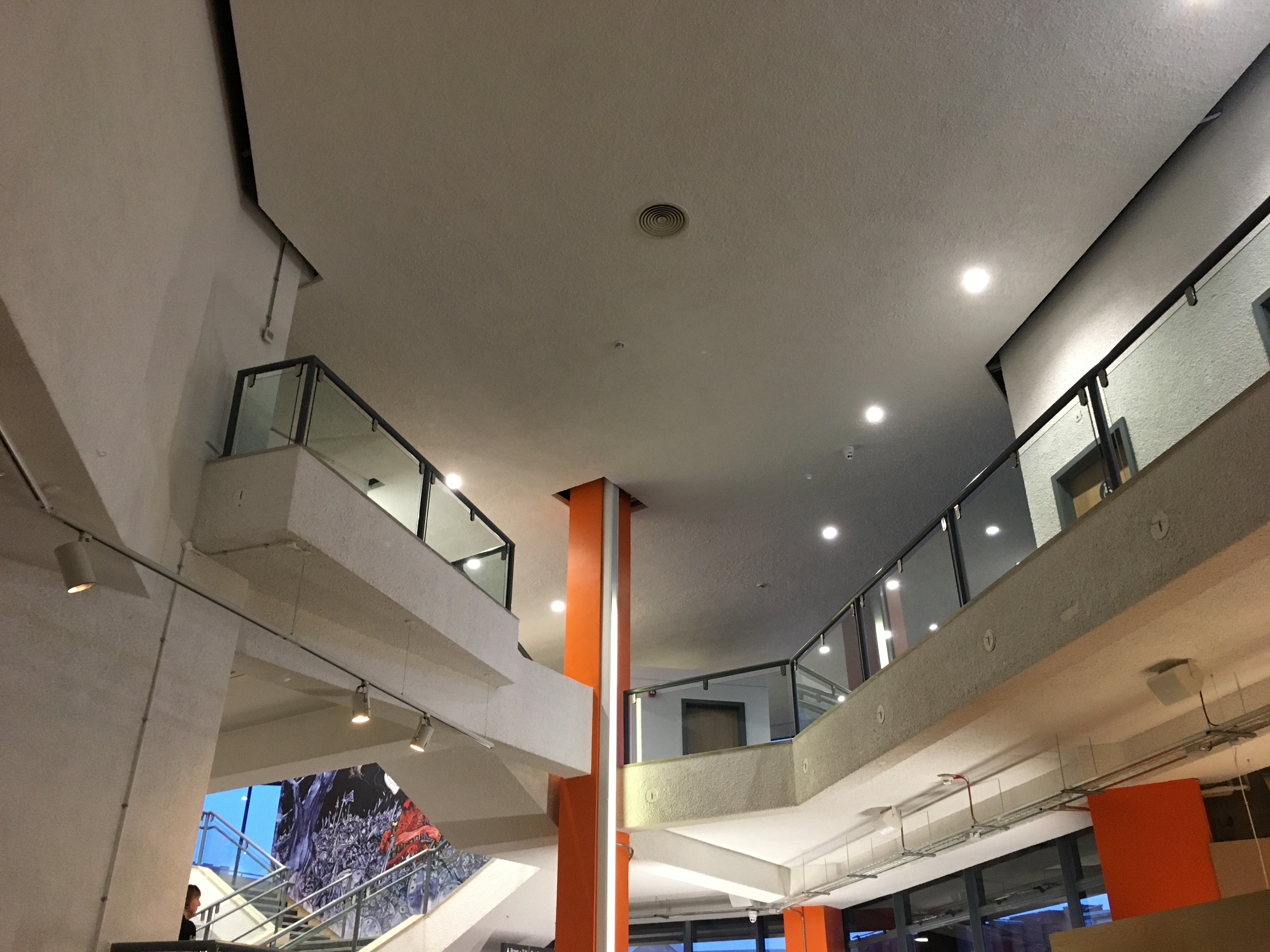
Foyer area demonstrating Brutailst architecture

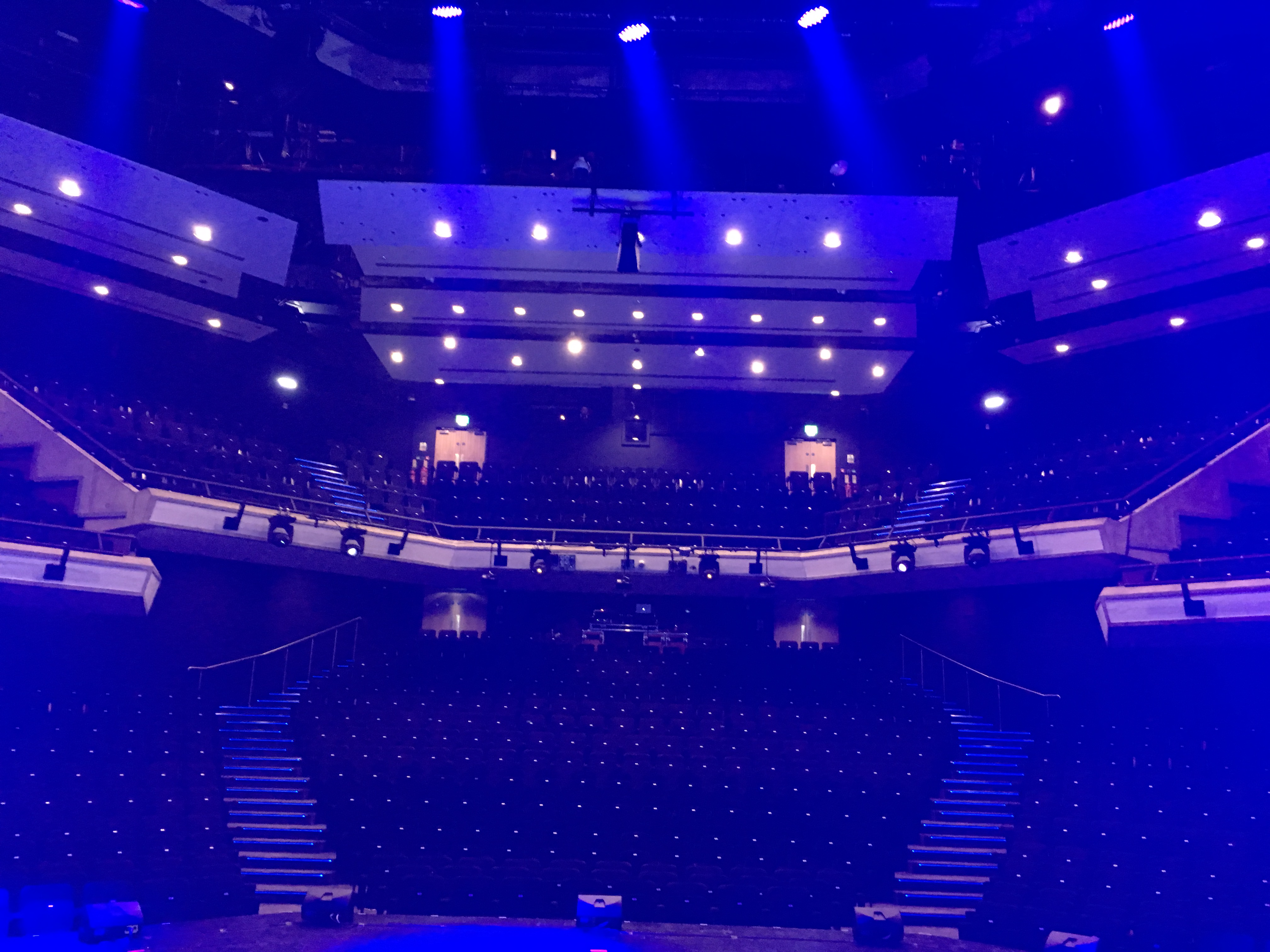
The main auditorium has 901 seats

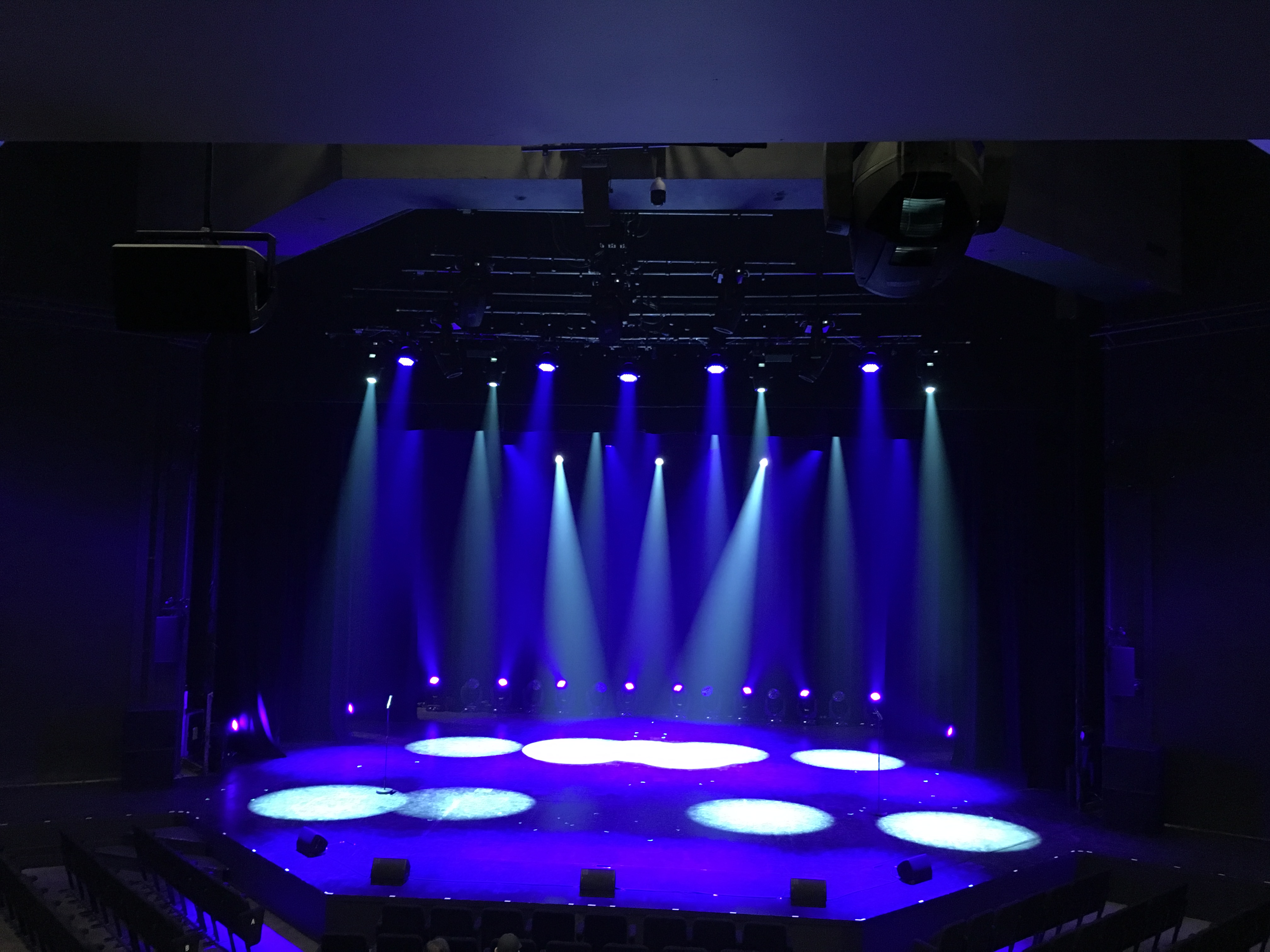
The main stage is the largest in England

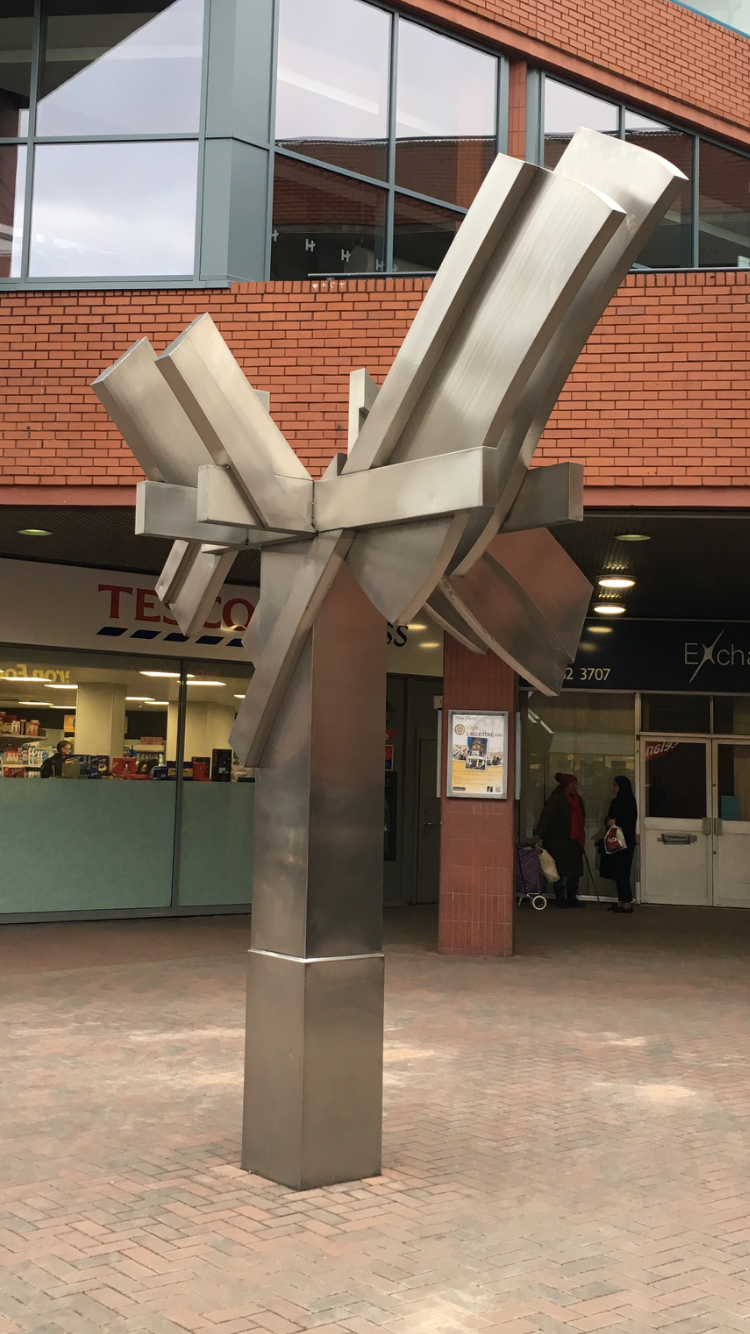
Metal Tree sculpture

== See also ==
- Curve (theatre)
- Little Theatre (Leicester)
- Sue Townsend Theatre
- De Montfort Hall
