= List of Where the Heart Is episodes =

Where the Heart Is is a British television drama series created by Ashley Pharoah and Vicky Featherstone, originally produced by United Productions in association with Anglia Television, later, Meridian Broadcasting, and finally, entirely by Granada Television in its final year. It was commissioned for ITV and premiered on 6 April 1997, lasting ten series and 110 episodes, concluding on 10 September 2006.

The series initially centres on the personal and professional lives of two district nurses, Peggy Snow (Pam Ferris) and Ruth Goddard (Sarah Lancashire) in the fictional town of Skelthwaite, a close-knit community in Yorkshire. Following their departures, the series shifted focus to the residents of the town. Filming of the show took place in Colne Valley in West Yorkshire, mainly within the villages of Marsden, Slaithwaite, the town of Meltham, and occasionally the Town Hall in Huddersfield.

== Series overview ==
Series	Episodes	Originally released	
Series	Episodes	First released	Last released
1	6	6 April 1997	11 May 1997
2	10	19 April 1998	5 July 1998
3	14	18 April 1999	25 July 1999
4	16	30 April 2000	3 September 2000
5	16	22 April 2001	12 August 2001
6	12	21 April 2002	7 July 2002
7	9	6 July 2003	23 December 2003
8	8	11 July 2004	29 August 2004
9	10	26 June 2005	28 August 2005
10	9	16 July 2006	10 September 2006

== Episodes ==
=== Series 1 (1997) ===
No. overall	No. in series	Title	Directed by	Written by	Original release date
1	1	"Skelthwaite"	Herbert Wise	Ashley Pharoah	6 April 1997
First-ever episode. Peggy is a district nurse in West Yorkshire. When she decides to help a patient in severe pain, she ends up being accused of murder. In the meantime, Peggy's assistant and her husband's boss are having a baby.
2	2	"Things Fall Apart"	Herbert Wise	Ashley Pharoah	13 April 1997
Peggy sets about investigating a small boy's behavioural problems.
3	3	"Summoned by Bells"	Anthony Garner	Ashley Pharoah	20 April 1997
A seemingly trivial incident in a nursing home turns into a nightmare for Ruth.
4	4	"A Place in the World"	Anthony Garner	Ashley Pharoah	27 April 1997
A trip to Scarborough brings back memories for Ruth as she bumps into an old flame.
5	5	"King Walter"	Jan Sargent	Ashley Pharoah	4 May 1997
A crisis arises when Walter's flat catches fire.
6	6	"Dream"	Jan Sargent	Ashley Pharoah	11 May 1997
The Scorpions prepare to do battle for the honour of the town.

=== Series 2 (1998) ===
No. overall	No. in series	Title	Directed by	Written by	Original release date
7	1	"The Final Curtain"	A.J. Quinn	Ashley Pharoah	19 April 1998
Peggy and Ruth suffer divided loyalties after Vic has an accident at Goddard's.
8	2	"The Healing Game"	Herbert Wise	Peter Bowker	26 April 1998
The new publican falls out with the rugby team.
9	3	"Fresh"	Nick Laughland	Ashley Pharoah	3 May 1998
A young nurse whose approach challenges established practices joins the centre but Stephen likes her more than a little!
10	4	"Gone Fishing"	Nick Laughland	Stephen Greenhorn	10 May 1998
On a fishing trip to Whitby, the lads' real catches are made on land.
11	5	"Darkness Follows"	Anthony Garner	Stephen Greenhorn	17 May 1998
Ruth and Simon have their hopes of a holiday dashed.
12	6	"Family Matters"	Anthony Garner	Peter Bowker	24 May 1998
Tragedy strikes the community when Dick runs over a child with his van.
13	7	"Ice Pops"	Hettie Macdonald	Michael Wynne	31 May 1998
While Peggy has to face up to the possibility of her own serious illness, Dick is having difficulty coming to terms with the death of the boy in the car accident. Ruth had problems of her own with her grandmother.
14	8	"No Place Like Home"	Hettie Macdonald	Peter Bowker	7 June 1998
Vic and Peggy take off on a silver wedding anniversary weekend in the Lakes.
15	9	"She Goes On"	Nick Laughland	Ashley Pharoah	21 June 1998
Ruth's attraction to a doctor leads her to think that he is not all he seems. Peggy has problems with Stephen seeing Jackie, and Dick faces a hearing over the accident.
16	10	"Love"	Nick Laughland	Ashley Pharoah	5 July 1998
Vic's first love returns to Skelthwaite causing some concern for Peggy.

=== Series 3 (1999) ===
No. overall	No. in series	Title	Directed by	Written by	Original release date	UK viewers (millions)
17	1	"Expansions"	Christopher King	Danny Miller	18 April 1999	11.70
Cheryl drops a bombshell, and Ruth surprises Simon.
18	2	"Learning the Game"	Indra Bhose	Stephen Bennett	25 April 1999	10.48
Tension mounts when Vic jeopardises a young man's rugby career.
19	3	"Flesh and Blood" (Note: There are three episodes with the title "Flesh and Blood", namely Series 3, Episode 3; Series 6, Episode 10; and Series 10, Episode 8.)	Indra Bhose	John O'Donnell	2 May 1999	9.18
There is devastating news for Simon and Ruth.
20	4	"Letting Go"	Christopher King	Toby Whithouse	9 May 1999	10.47
Jacqui returns to Skelthwaite and reveals to Stephen that she is pregnant.
21	5	"Moving On"	Christopher King	Ben Rostul	16 May 1999	10.83
Stephen is hit by a bombshell, and Sandra is unsure whether she has made the right decision.
22	6	"Home"	Mike Vardy	Johanne McAndrew	23 May 1999	10.58
Peggy attends an Italian class and turns out to be a natural.
23	7	"Reach for the Stars"	Martyn Friend	Johanne McAndrew	30 May 1999	9.58
Henry organises a team-building weekend in the Lake District while Alison and Jacqui meet.
24	8	"New Moon Arising"	Simon Massey	Danny Miller	6 June 1999	10.33
Ruth has an emotional time searching for the mother of an abandoned baby.
25	9	"Not My Brother"	Simon Massey	Ben Rostul	20 June 1999	9.24
Ruth and Simon are distraught when Alfie has to be rushed to hospital.
26	10	"A Special Language"	Mike Vardy	Stephen Bennett	27 June 1999	9.00
A teacher's suicide attempt hits not only his family but also Peggy and Stephen.
27	11	"A Higher Duty"	Christopher King	Stephen Bennett	4 July 1999	8.63
Stephen and Jacqui are finally reconciled, but Ruth's and Simon's lives are further apart than ever.
28	12	"Runaway"	Christopher King	Declan Croghan	11 July 1999	8.03
Peggy feels responsible when a tramp comes to Skelthwaite and takes up past memories for both Walter and a newly married couple.
29	13	"Union"	Jonas Grimås	Paul Coates	18 July 1999	7.71
Dick struggles with the news about why he and Cheryl have been unable to conceive, and Ruth tells Simon she's made a decision about their future together.
30	14	"The Letter"	Jonas Grimås	Ben Rostul	25 July 1999	8.36
Ghosts from the past haunt Ruth and Peggy, and a cold front in Skelthwaite creates a business for Keith.

=== Series 4 (2000) ===
No. overall	No. in series	Title	Directed by	Written by	Original release date	UK viewers (millions)
31	1	"Breaking the Ice"	Alan Dossor	Danny Miller	30 April 2000	8.74
Anna Kirkwall starts late on the first day of her new job at the health centre.
32	2	"No Regrets"	David Thacker	Johanne McAndrew	7 May 2000	9.91
The new male nurse sets tongues wagging in Skelthwaite.
33	3	"The Dead Zone"	Chris Bernard	Ben Rostul	14 May 2000	9.23
The nurses' survival skills are put to the test when they are stranded on the Moors.
34	4	"Shifting Sands"	David Thacker	Stephen Bennett	21 May 2000	10.10
Chris's over friendly manner towards a daughter of a man suffering from MS puts his job in danger. Peggy is offered a promotion, but it means working in Leeds.
35	5	"Visiting Rights"	Chris Bernard	Robert Fraser	28 May 2000	8.74
A prisoner is granted compassionate leave to visit his father, who is unwell, after an appeal from Sister Anna, and Anna's mother comes to visit, causing her stress. Simon moves in with Henry.
36	6	"The Leaving Party"	Alan Dossor	Paul Coates	4 June 2000	10.40
Peggy's farewell party at the health centre arrives.
37	7	"A Foreign Field"	Christopher King	Danny Miller	11 June 2000	9.43
The Skelthwaite Scorpions travel to France. While there, Vic visits the war grave of his uncle.
38	8	"Unforgettable"	Christopher King	Ashley Pharoah	9 July 2000	9.64
A runaway horse causes a fatal road accident. In the aftermath of the crash, Peggy dies from the injuries she sustained from the car crash.
39	9	"A Good Day"	Chris Bernard	Ben Rostul	16 July 2000	9.33
Skelthwaite comes together in mourning to say goodbye to a much loved resident. A glamorous blonde visits the village; is she here to stay?
40	10	"Friends in Need"	Chris Bernard	Ben Rostul	23 July 2000	10.04
Vic and Lucy have problems coping with Peggy's death. Karen's new job puts a strain on her friendship with Anna.
41	11	"Idle Hands"	Moira Armstrong	Paul Coates	30 July 2000	8.29
Tension rises between Karen and Jacqui, but a night out calms things down. Chris and Jacqui discover a lucrative secret.
42	12	"Over the Rainbow"	Moira Armstrong	Jacquetta May	6 August 2000	8.40
The atmosphere in the Snow house is fraught with tension as the whole family struggle to cope without Peggy.
43	13	"Modern Love"	Christopher King	Robert Fraser	13 August 2000	8.31
Henry and Jess have an eventful meal together while Simon and Anna go on a date that is memorable for all the wrong reasons.
44	14	"Legacy"	Christopher King	Adrian Mead	20 August 2000	9.29
Goddard's is threatened with closure after a virus attacks the children of Skelthwaite.
45	15	"Getting Better"	Chris Bernard	Robert Fraser	27 August 2000	8.48
The nurses suspect a patient is being abused.
46	16	"The Field"	Chris Bernard	Ben Rostul	3 September 2000	7.88
The nurses suspect a patient is being abused.

=== Series 5 (2001) ===
No. overall	No. in series	Title	Directed by	Written by	Original release date	UK viewers (millions)
47	1	"Happiness"	Moira Armstrong	Robert Fraser	22 April 2001	9.85
Karen and Anna help an apparently perfect family come to terms with a troubled past. Karen faces her 40th birthday, and Vic receives some disturbing news.
48	2	"Runaways"	Christopher King	Declan Croghan	29 April 2001	8.80
An elderly patient is driven to take drastic measures when his wife is put into intensive care.
49	3	"Sanctuary"	Christopher King	Ben Cooper	6 May 2001	7.51
Karen puts her career on the line when she clashes with Dr. Kenworthy over her concerns for one of his patients.
50	4	"Choices"	Christopher King	John Martin Johnson	13 May 2001	8.52
The nurses help a young couple cope with a life changing dilemma, but Anna has worries of her own.
51	5	"The Ties That Bind"	Moira Armstrong	John Martin Johnson	20 May 2001	8.36
A glamorous blonde causes havoc. Anna plucks up the courage to tell Simon about her pregnancy.
52	6	"Home to Roost"	Moira Armstrong; Jeremy Silberston	John Martin Johnson	27 May 2001	8.12
A new pretty young nurse arrives at the health centre and brings with her a breath of fresh air.
53	7	"Faith"	Christopher King	Adrian Mead	3 June 2001	8.64
Anna and Karen believe that a patient's treatment is being compromised by the intervention of a faith healer.
54	8	"Pound of Flesh"	Jamie Annett	Michael Ennis	17 June 2001	9.05
A mysterious young man causes havoc when he comes to Skelthwaite looking for his long lost father.
55	9	"Damage"	Moira Armstrong	John Martin Johnson	24 June 2001	7.83
Luke and Oscar continue to cause trouble for everyone as Karen gets ready to take a life-changing journey. Dick and Cheryl confront Oscar.
56	10	"Too Much Too Young"	Jeremy Silberston	Matt Parker	1 July 2001	8.56
A young school girl confides in Anna, telling her that she is heavily pregnant.
57	11	"Temptation"	Keith Washington	Nicola Baldwin	8 July 2001	8.69
Karen allows her mother to stay at her house for a few days. David is made a tempting offer by a Canadian businessman.
58	12	"As Time Goes By"	Julie Edwards	Carol Cullington	15 July 2001	9.42
One year after her death from a fatal car crash, friends of Peggy hold a memorial service to remember her. Anna and Karen have a patient who still thinks he is at work, but it's been closed for six months. They reunite him with his children.
59	13	"Declaration"	Keith Washington	Tony Ramsay	22 July 2001	8.14
Skelthwaite prepare to vote, while Paul Goayer suspects his wife is being unfaithful.
60	14	"Sticks and Stones"	Julie Edwards	Michael Ennis	29 July 2001	7.47
A good looking new employee at Goddard's sets heart a flutter, but what secret does he hide? Karen's mother says she has devastating news.
61	15	"Cats and Dogs"	Jamie Annett	John Martin Johnson	5 August 2001	8.44
The nurses get more than they bargain for when Anna organises a darts match in The Skelthwaite Arms.
62	16	"The Team"	Jamie Annett	John Martin Johnson	12 August 2001	9.40
David is caught up in a lucrative scam while Glenn wants nothing to do with Marie or her baby.

=== Series 6 (2002) ===
No. overall	No. in series	Title	Directed by	Written by	Original release date	UK viewers (millions)
63	1	"No Turning Back"	Jamie Annett	Tony Ramsay	21 April 2002	7.69
Simon has a surprise for Anna, and a new family sets tongues wagging in town.
64	2	"Relative Strangers"	Jamie Annett	Robin Mukherjee	28 April 2002	7.20
Karen and Beth reunite an estranged family when a baby girl goes missing, Vic makes a shock announcement.
65	3	"Happy Returns"	Clive Arnold	Nicola Baldwin	5 May 2002	6.31
The Buckleys face a family crisis, and an old flame of David threatens to cause trouble.
66	4	"Trust"	Jon East	Simon Allen	12 May 2002	7.21
Karen's secret past is revealed by Evelyn, and Simon is getting cold feet about his impending nuptials.
67	5	"In Your Dreams"	Jon East	Andrea Earl	19 May 2002	7.24
Simon's business is crumbling, and he feels guilty over his fling with Evelyn.
68	6	"United We Stand"	Terry McDonough	Andrea Earl	26 May 2002	7.56
A heartbroken Anna faces fresh pressure over the future of the factory now Simon has put it in Amy's name.
69	7	"Hold My Hand"	Clive Arnold	Nicola Baldwin	2 June 2002	6.99
Karen is attacked. Luke gets into huge trouble at school. Tom proposes to Beth.
70	8	"Don't Let Go"	Terry McDonough	Michael Ennis	9 June 2002	7.84
A wedding cake reminds Anna of lost happiness. Karen struggles to forgive Garth.
71	9	"Never Alone"	Jan Sargent	Cecily Hobbs	16 June 2002	7.73
A teacher's forgetfulness puts her pupils at risk. Anna tries to impress a bank manager but loses her temper.
72	10	"Flesh and Blood"	Jan Sargent	Carolyn Bonnyman	23 June 2002	7.77
Baby Amy is rushed into hospital with suspected meningitis, and Molly is being bullied in school.
73	11	"Count on Me"	Clive Arnold	Matt Parker	30 June 2002	8.68
When an elderly man is discovered injured by the side of the road, the nurses get involved in the hunt for the hit-and-run motorcyclist.
74	12	"Extra Time"	Clive Arnold	Nicola Baldwin	7 July 2002	8.66
The factory in Skelthwaite employs a new arrival in town, a mother of five.

=== Series 7 (2003) ===
No. overall	No. in series	Title	Directed by	Written by	Original release date	UK viewers (millions)
75	1	"My Way"	Moira Armstrong	John Martin Johnson; Carolyn Bonnyman	6 July 2003	7.07
A new family arrives in Skelthwaite, putting Anna's nose out of joint. David is shocked when Karen is contacted by someone from the past.
76	2	"The Games We Play"	Brian Farnham	Helen Griffin	13 July 2003	6.66
Karen's happiness at finding her son begins to fade when she discovers his dark secret.
77	3	"The Need of You"	Brian Farnham	Andrea Earl	20 July 2003	8.14
Karen follows her runaway son to London. Alan enters the men into a talent contest.
78	4	"Love Hurts"	Moira Armstrong	Carolyn Bonnyman	27 July 2003	8.20
Sally is appalled by Nathan's taste when he falls for the rich daughter of a local rugby team captain.
79	5	"Not Waving But Drowning"	Paul Walker	Cecily Hobbs	3 August 2003	7.25
There is turmoil when Karen leaves. David decides that there is nothing left for him in Skelthwaite.
80	6	"A Time to Dance"	Paul Walker	Sian Evans	10 August 2003	7.71
A line dancer comes to Skelthwaite and takes a shine to Anna, while Nathan announces that he wants to marry.
81	7	"Coming Home"	Emma Bodger	Louise Roche	17 August 2003	7.43
Beth and Tom's relationship is put to the test as they struggle to come to terms with her ectopic pregnancy.
82	8	"Mister & Missus"	Emma Bodger	Adrian Pagan	24 August 2003	6.34
On Beth and Tom's wedding day, Jo puts a spanner in the works by saying he doesn't want to be best man.
83	9	"Archangel"	Emma Bodger	John Martin Johnson	23 December 2003	5.79
Christmas special. The nurses "go on strike" with their various family Christmas preparations and insist the men take over. At work, the women try to reconcile a father and daughter, while Anna has an unexpected suitor.

=== Series 8 (2004) ===
No. overall	No. in series	Title	Directed by	Written by	Original release date	UK viewers (millions)
84	1	"Bowl of Cherries"	Emma Bodger	Cecily Hobbs	11 July 2004	8.40
Nathan decides to give up university studies to become an artist instead, and Beth worries that Tom prefers being at the factory than spending time with her. Kate decides to marry her boyfriend.
85	2	"Stormy Weather"	Emma Bodger	Sian Evans	18 July 2004	7.60
Tom convinces Anna to go after a new investor for the factory. An elderly patient takes a liking to Beth as she reminds her of her dead sister.
86	3	"Moon River"	Paul Walker	Matt Parker	25 July 2004	7.75
Ozias has Alan fired from the factory, and Luke's first match with the Scorpions has tragic consequences.
87	4	"The Games We Play"	Moira Armstrong	Cecily Hobbs	1 August 2004	6.91
Unable to take Ozias' bullying any more, Billy resigns for good.
88	5	"Little Boy Blue"	Paul Walker	Nicola Baldwin	8 August 2004	7.28
Beth is fed up with Tom being too overprotective, and Anna is torn between saving the factory and remaining loyal to her friends. Luke returns home from hospital but his attitude towards David has changed.
89	6	"Skin Deep"	Moira Armstrong	Cecily Hobbs	15 August 2004	7.52
Nathan discovers that Alice has been two timing them. An accusation by a wife of a man who suffered severe burns puts Billy's and Sally's marriage under strain.
90	7	"Body & Soul"	Jan Sargent	Sian Evans	22 August 2004	6.98
Ozias suffers from a cerebral aneurysm, but before being admitted to hospital, he tries to ruin the factory once and for all. Beth takes the local widows on an excursion but her water breaks halfway through the journey.
91	8	"Never Can Say Goodbye"	Jan Sargent	Cecily Hobbs	29 August 2004	6.57
A foster mother struggles to cope with her foster son returning to his natural mother.

=== Series 9 (2005) ===
No. overall	No. in series	Title	Directed by	Written by	Original release date	UK viewers (millions)
92	1	"Care"	Paul Walker	Cecily Hobbs	26 June 2005	7.04
Anna and David tie the knot. After losing his sister in a fatal car crash, Goddard's employee Danny struggles to look after his niece if it means he has to change his lifestyle.
93	2	"When All This Is Over"	Paul Walker	Matt Parker	3 July 2005	6.88
Danny struggles in his role as a parent. Ozias hires his military coach to train the Scorpions. Luke and Megan discover some shocking news.
94	3	"Stamp of Approval"	Jan Sargent	Sian Evans	10 July 2005	6.34
Billy, Joe, David and Danny all go searching for Harding's deputy. Luke and Megan can't decide whom to tell about their pregnancy. New nurse Kim Blakeney arrives at Skelthwaite.
95	4	"Sisters Under the Skin"	Jan Sargent	Nicola Baldwin	17 July 2005	6.63
Billy's attempt to stay on the side of the workers backfires. Sally and Anna clash when they discover Megan's shock pregnancy.
96	5	"Together"	Moira Armstrong	Tony Ramsay	24 July 2005	7.32
Sally's heavy handed treatment of Megan and Luke backfires. Kim and Danny can't get their friendship right. Bravely, Jean reveals her illness to her new boyfriend.
97	6	"Legacy"	Moira Armstrong	Cecily Hobbs	31 July 2005	6.92
Megan and Luke take a natural approach to her pregnancy. Sally is disappointed with life. Laura and Adam Miller are concerned about their son.
98	7	"Brief Encounters"	Ian Bevitt	Nicola Baldwin	7 August 2005	7.09
Simon Goddard returns from Australia unannounced. Joan can't bring himself to tell Ozias about Alice. Kim's involvement with Alistair Pope becomes increasingly difficult.
99	8	"Peaches and Cream"	Ian Bevitt	Matt Parker	14 August 2005	7.14
Simon's involvement at Goddard's concerns Anna and David, causing Ozias to resign. Sally's insecure about her marriage. Megan decides not to return to school. Ed and Pete's friendship is on the line.
100	9	"So Long"	Jan Sargent	Cecily Hobbs	21 August 2005	7.02
Sally tries to help an emphysema patient reconcile with his grandson. Megan's baby shower holds a few surprises. Meanwhile, Kim and Danny are keeping their relationship from their kids.
101	10	"In a Perfect World"	Jan Sargent	Cecily Hobbs	28 August 2005	6.74
Skelthwaite mourns Sally's death. Danny and Cady move into Kim's house. Anna faces a dilemma when she becomes involved in Cathy Saunders' adoption application. The factory makes an unusual contribution to the kids' art fair.

=== Series 10 (2006) ===
No. overall	No. in series	Title	Directed by	Written by	Original release date	UK viewers (millions)
102	1	"R.S.V.P."	Paul Walker	Cecily Hobbs	16 July 2006	4.37
Anna and Kim welcome a new edition to the team, trainee nurse Zoe. Billy plots a revenge prank on a rival rugby team.
103	2	"Greater Love"	Paul Walker	Simon Burt	23 July 2006	4.71
Anna's judgement is called into question. Zoe makes a shock discovery. Ozias is concerned to find an old adversary has business in Skelthwaite.
104	3	"Home Grown"	Ian Bevitt	Karen McLachlan	30 July 2006	5.18
The factory loses an important contract. After twenty years, Mark and Marla return to Skelthwaite. His deteriorating health affects his marriage and his relationship with a former friend.
105	4	"Walk of Faith"	Ian Bevitt	Nicola Baldwin	6 August 2006	5.35
David and Anna's romantic weekend in Blackpool changes course when their family and friends decide to join them. Billy faces up to the loss of his wife, Sally.
106	5	"Closure"	Moira Armstrong	Cecily Hobbs	13 August 2006	5.86
David's birthday proves a bad day to celebrate as it's crunch time at Goddard's. Anna has to find a replacement for Kim. Emma has moved in with her new boyfriend, Andy.
107	6	"Finding Heaven"	Moira Armstrong	Simon Burt	20 August 2006	5.62
It's Nisha's first week as district nurse but things go badly when she clashes with Anna. The Skelthwaite Scorpions need an injection of new blood.
108	7	"Don't Look Back in Anger"	Jan Sargent	Matt Parker	27 August 2006	5.21
Anna resolves to mount a picket at the construction of the new supermarket site. Nisha fails to notice a bond developing between her daughter and Robert Ashford.
109	8	"Flesh and Blood"	Jan Sargent	Sian Evans	3 September 2006	5.96
Anna has to decide whether to accept the Ashford's offer to buy Goddard's land. For the local butcher, the Ashford's supermarket could mean the closure of their business.
110	9	"And on the Way I Dropped It"	David Tucker	Cecily Hobbs	10 September 2006	6.71
Last-ever episode. It's the wedding of Luke and Megan, and all of Skelthwaite is excited. Terri helps Billy practise his speech; they kiss in the end, but both are aghast.
