= Theatre Date =

1969 British television series

Theatre Date is a British anthology television series that aired on BBC1 in 1969. The series aired televised broadcasts of current plays from London's West End. A total of five broadcasts were made in the series. These included: William Douglas-Home's The Secretary Bird (January 23, 1969); Ronald Millar's They Don't Grow on Trees (February 14, 1969); Joyce Rayburn's The Man Most Likely To... (February 26, 1969); Basil Dawson and Felicity Douglas's The Crunch (October 14, 1969); and Jim Wise, George Haimsohn and Robin Miller's musical Dames at Sea (November 4, 1969).

== Episode status ==
Of the 5 broadcasts, three are lost, being "They Don't Grow on Trees", "The Crunch", & "Dames at Sea", with no recordings known to exist.
