= Felix Rojas =

Puerto Rican writer, director, and producer

- Born: Felix Manuel Rojas; July 11, 1962 (age 63); Bronx, NY, U.S.
- Occupations: Writer, director, producer
- Spouse: Saida Rios
- Children: 2 sons

Felix Manuel Rojas (born July 11, 1962) is a Puerto Rican writer, director, and producer from The Bronx, New York, best known for his play Growing Up Gonzales.

== Career ==
Rojas began his theatrical career at Syracuse University in a production of Short Eyes by Miguel Pinero. In the mid 1980s, Rojas was introduced to Marvin Felix Camillo, artistic director of The Family Repertory Company (known as "The Family"), who became Rojas' mentor. The Family's primary focus was staging English-language plays written by Hispanic writers that depicted the experience of being raised in an urban environment, and through this company Rojas produced his first two original works, Hotel Presidential and From the Mind of Cheo. He also traveled to Spain and Cuba with The Family as a writer, stage manager, and production manager.

After the production of Mandance, Rojas took a 17-year break from the industry to focus on raising his two sons, Felix Jr. and Nick. During this time he served as a director of a Boys and Girls club, and worked in outreach for the homeless for five years before returning to the theater.

In 2009, Rojas was introduced to a script-writing program by his son Nick, and subsequently began writing again, returning to the entertainment industry in 2010 with several original works. His most successful work since his return was Growing Up Gonzales, which opened in the Pregones Theater in 2010 and played on and off for the following seven years throughout New York, in The Jan Hus Playhouse, The Poet's Den Theater, and The Medicine Theater. Set in the Bronx during the 1970s, Growing Up Gonzales is a two-act show following the life of two brothers, Johnny and Cisco, who grow up in the same environment but lead completely different lives. The play includes a comedic voiceover at the beginning explaining Puerto Rican customs and Spanish expressions that appear in the performance.

== Works ==
=== Plays ===
- Hotel Presidential
- Soy Chris
- From the Mind of Cheo
- Mandance
- El Conde y La Condesa

=== Films ===
- On the Down Low
- A Place for Us
- Perfect Vision

=== Television ===
- Papi's Promise - TV pilot

== Awards and nominations ==
- HOLA for Outstanding Achievement in play writing
- Williamsburg International Film Festival for Outstanding Achievement in Filmmaking
