= Robert Mandell =

Robert Mandell may refer to:

- Robert Mandell (film producer), American film and animated series director and producer
- Robert Mandell (conductor) (1929–2020), American-born British-based conductor
- Robert A. Mandell (born 1947), American attorney, diplomat and businessman
- G Koop (Robert Mandell), American record producer, songwriter and musician

== See also ==
- Robert Mandel (born 1945), film and television producer and director
