= Robin Midgley =

English director (1934–2007)

Robin Midgley (10 November 1934 – 19 May 2007) was an English director in theatre, television and radio and responsible for some of the earliest episodes of Z-Cars and for the television version of the Royal Shakespeare Company's Wars of the Roses.

== Early life ==
Midgley was born in Torquay, Devon, and educated at Blundell's School in Tiverton, Devon, and at King's College, Cambridge, where he directed plays with casts including Jonathan Miller, Sylvia Plath and Daniel Massey.

Midgley married, first, the playwright and psychotherapist Liane Aukin, and, in 1991, the dancer and choreographer Denni Sayers. His two sons from his first marriage are Baptist minister Benjamin Midgley and child psychotherapist Nicholas Midgley.

== Career ==
After Cambridge, Midgley was employed as a drama producer for BBC Radio and was posted to Jamaica, where he worked closely with the comedian and broadcaster Charles Hyatt.

Midgley’s first London stage production, Kill Two Birds, was at the St Martin's Theatre in 1961, and his first in New York City, Those That Play the Clowns, in 1966. He also worked for two seasons with Bernard Miles at the Mermaid Theatre, at Blackfriars in the City of London, before taking charge of the Phoenix Theatre, Leicester, in 1968, a post in which he continued while simultaneously opening the new Haymarket Theatre in Leicester in 1973 as its first artistic director.

The Haymarket produced Joseph and the Amazing Technicolour Dreamcoat in 1974, 1975, 1976, 1978, and 1985. During this period, the production transitioned from a shorter school version into a full-length musical.

Midgley was later in charge of the Cambridge Theatre Company based at the Arts Theatre (1988–91) and the Lyric Theatre, Belfast (1992–98).

His theatrical productions have included:

- Boris Vian's Victor for the Royal Shakespeare Company at the Aldwych in 1964
- Athol Fugard’s 1968 play Mille Miglia about Stirling Moss
- Alan Ayckbourn's play How the Other Half Loves with Robert Morley in 1970
- William Douglas-Home's Lloyd George Knew My Father in 1972, starring Ralph Richardson and Peggy Ashcroft
- Terence Rattigan's Cause Célèbre at Her Majesty's Theatre in 1977
- Lionel Bart's musical Oliver! at the Albery Theatre in 1977, starring Roy Hudd as Fagin
- The 1979 West End revival of My Fair Lady produced by Cameron Mackintosh at the Adelphi Theatre with Tony Britton, Liz Robertson, Dame Anna Neagle, Richard Caldicot and Peter Land
- Petula Clark's musical Someone Like You at the Strand Theatre in 1990
- John Lahr's 1991 adaptation of Richard Condon's The Manchurian Candidate at the Lyric, Hammersmith

== Later life ==
In later life, Midgley gave acting lessons to young singers at the Royal Opera House, and taught and directed at the Royal Academy of Dramatic Art.

== Sources ==
- Obituary - Robin Midgley, The Guardian, 23 May 2007

http://www.arthurlloyd.co.uk/LeicesterTheatres/HaymarketTheatreLeicester.htm
