= Cause Célèbre (play) =

Radio play by Terence Rattigan

First edition (publ. Hamish Hamilton, 1978)

Cause Célèbre or A Woman of Principle is a 1975 radio play, and the final play by the English author Terence Rattigan. It was inspired by the trial of Alma Rattenbury and her teenage lover in 1935 for the murder of her third husband Francis Rattenbury and first broadcast on BBC Radio 4 on 27 October 1975. It was Rattigan's first radio play, and Alma was played by Diana Dors. Rattigan was then commissioned to rewrite it as a stage play, ready to be produced in Autumn 1976, but his terminal cancer and casting problems meant he was able to start work only in January 1977, alongside director Robin Midgley. This stage version premiered at the Haymarket Theatre, Leicester in 1977 before its West End premiere on 4 July 1977 at Her Majesty's Theatre in London, with Glynis Johns as Alma Rattenbury and Helen Lindsay as Edith Davenport. It received largely positive reviews. Rattigan discharged himself from hospital to attend the opening night.

A 1987 television version of the stage play starred Helen Mirren as Alma and David Suchet as O'Connor. The stage play itself was revived at the Old Vic from March to June 2011 to mark Rattigan's centenary. The revival was directed by Thea Sharrock, with Alma played by Anne-Marie Duff and Edith Davenport by Niamh Cusack. Reviews were mainly very positive, with The Guardian calling it a "fine revival" of a play which "stands the test of time", though the London Evening Standard regretted that "this is not Rattigan at his most eloquently anguished." A new production of the radio play was aired by BBC Radio 4 on 25 June 2011, again directed by Sharrock with original music by Adrian Johnston.

== Old Vic cast ==
- Joan Webster ..... Lucy Black
- Francis Rattenbury .... Timothy Carlton
- John Davenport .... Simon Chandler
- Croom-Johnson ..... Richard Clifford
- Christopher .... Oliver Coopersmith
- Christopher (Understudy) - Oscar Dunbar
- Edith Davenport .... Niamh Cusack
- Alma Rattenbury ..... Anne-Marie Duff
- Ewen Montagu ..... Rory Fleck-Byrne
- Tony Davenport .... Freddie Fox
- Irene Riggs .... Jenny Galloway
- Judge ...... Patrick Godfrey
- O'Connor .... Nicholas Jones
- George Wood .......Tommy McDonnell
- Stella Morrison ....... Lucy Robinson
- Clerk of the court .....Tristan Shepherd
- Casswell ....... Richard Teverson
- Wardress ....... Sarah Waddell
- Sergeant Bagwell ....... Michael Webber
- Coroner ....... Tristram Wymark
