= Nicola Baldwin =

British playwright and scriptwriter

Nicola Baldwin is a British playwright and scriptwriter.

== Life ==
She wrote for "Where the Heart Is (British TV series)", and "Have Your Cake" for BBC Radio 4.

== Awards ==
- 1993 George Devine Award
- 1993 Time Out Award, Best New Play

== Works ==
- Confetti, Oval House Theatre, London, 1992; The Last Refuge, London, 2012; Map Studio, London, 2012
- Undeveloped Land, Chelsea Theatre, London, 1993
- The Gift, Y Touring Theatre Company, 1995
- Cracked, Y Touring Theatre Company, 1996
- 23:59, Crucible Theatre, Sheffield, 1999
- The Rib Cage, Royal Exchange Theatre Studio, Manchester, 1999
- Leap of Faith, Y Touring Theatre and National Theatre Education, Albany Theatre, London, 2005
- The Thirteenth Devil, BBC Radio 4, Afternoon Play, 2006
- Beowulf, Ball Court, Prior Park College, Bath, 2007
- Metropolis, Ball Court, Prior Park College, Bath, 2008
- Seven Scenes, BBC Radio 3, The Wire, 2011
- Tony and Rose, BBC Radio 4, Afternoon Play, 2013
- Blackshirts, Royal National Theatre Studio, 2013
- All Saints, The Last Refuge, London, 2013; The Kings Head, London, 2013
- Hotel Bastille, Camden People’s Theatre, London, 2014
