= Robert Mandell (conductor) =

American music conductor (1929-2020)

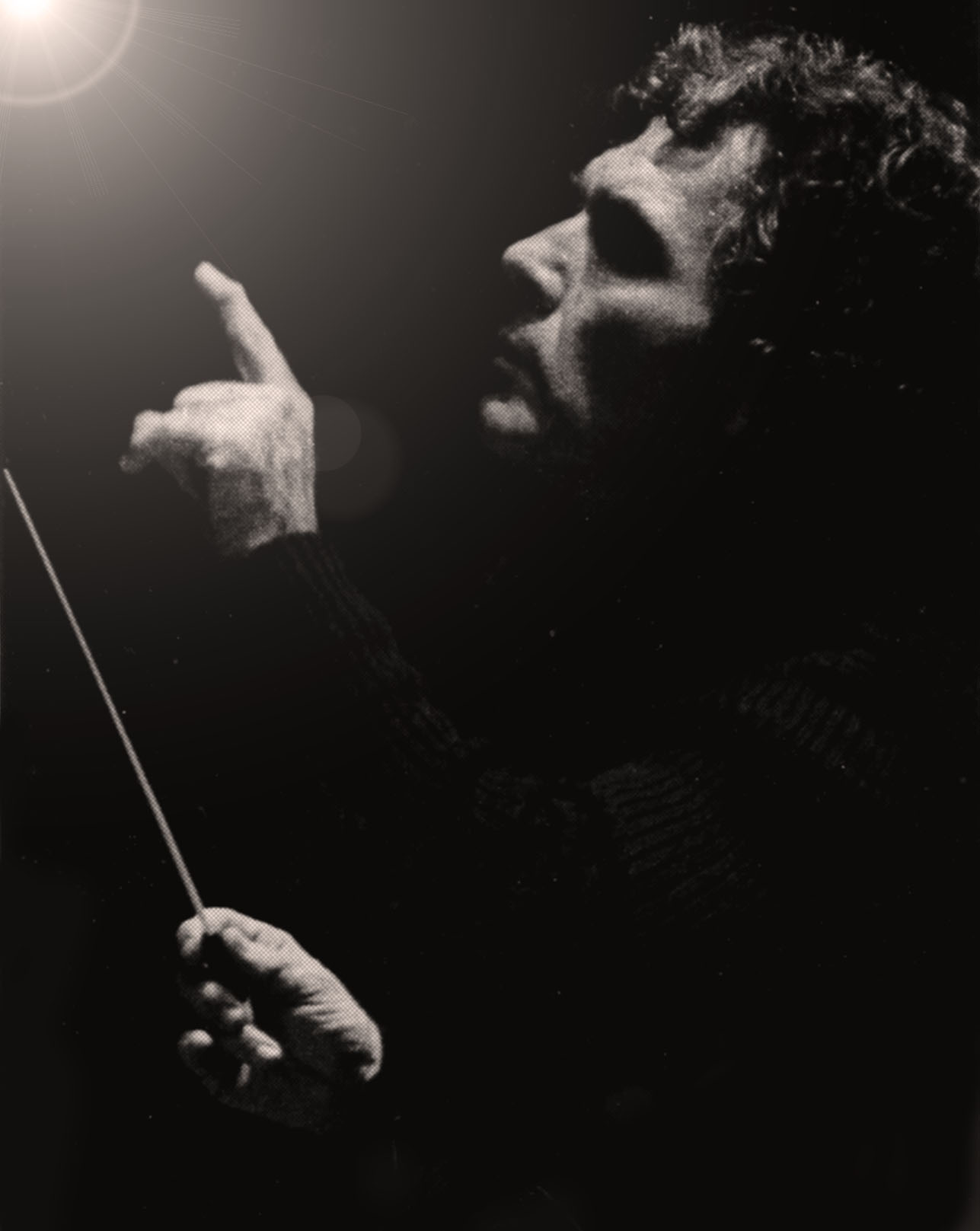
- Born: 22 August 1929; New York City, New York, U.S.
- Died: 25 April 2020 (aged 90); Leicester, England, UK
- Other names: Bobby Lee, Robert Lee
- Occupation: conductor

Robert Mandell (22 August 1929 – 25 April 2020) was an American-born British-based conductor. He conducted family and children's concerts, and stage musicals.

== Biography ==
=== Early life and education ===
Robert Mandell was born in New York City in August 1929, and was the youngest of four children. At the age of eight, Robert acted on the stage and in radio shows under the professional names Bobby Lee and Robert Lee. He worked on noted American radio shows such as Let's Pretend and Ellery Queen. His Broadway stage credits include the original season of Lady in the Dark with Gertrude Lawrence. (Note: Lady In the Dark also marked a personal triumph for Danny Kaye in that it is the Broadway show that launched his major entertainment career.) Mandell played Tad Lincoln in Yours, A. Lincoln, starring Vincent Price. (Note: The New York Times review of Yours A. Lincoln by Paul Horgan, based on the Otto Eisenschmidl book Why Was Lincoln Murdered?. Vincent Price was in the leading role and the play was mounted by the Experimental Theatre at the Schubert Theater on 101 July 1942, Director Robert Ross.)

Mandell began his undergraduate music studies at The City College of New York (CCNY) in 1947. While at CCNY, he made his conducting debut for a production mounted by its Theater Workshop of Leonard Bernstein's first hit musical On The Town. The production was attended by the show's creator, George Abbott, its stage director, writers and lyricists Betty Comden and Adolph Green, choreographer Jerome Robbins, and the show's composer, Leonard Bernstein. Bernstein recommended Mandell to his mentor Serge Koussevitsky for a scholarship to the Berkshire Music Center in Tanglewood, Massachusetts. Mandell studied for the next three summers under Bernstein, who took over the conducting department following Kousevitzky's death in 1951. Bernstein further recommended Mandell for a scholarship to the Juilliard School of Music in New York, where Mandell was awarded a three-year postgraduate scholarship in conducting under Jean Morel. (Note: Jean Morel (1903–1975) was a French conductor who emigrated to the United States in 1939. He taught at Brooklyn College and the Juilliard School of Music, and conducted at the New York Metropolitan Opera House. Notable protégés include James Levine and Leonard Slatkin.)

=== Career ===
In 1955, Mandell was appointed the special music assistant to Bernstein for a series of television specials he created for the Ford Foundation's sponsored arts program, Omnibus, on CBS. In 1956, Mandell founded the Ars Nova Ensemble, (Note: The Ars Nova Ensemble performed live under Mandell between 1956 and 1964 and performances were regularly reviewed by The New York Times. See New York Times Archives for concert reviews by Edward Downes July 29, 1958; John Briggs, April 19, 1960; Eric Salzman March 18, 1961 and March 20, 1962, Raymond Ericson December 23, 1963; "H.K" February 17, 1964) with whom he began to perform an annual series of concerts at Town Hall and Carnegie Hall in New York City. His Ars Nova 1956 recording of Stravinsky's L'Histoire du Soldat, one of the earliest to employ stereo technology, has been re-released after 50 years. That same year he was appointed music director of the York Symphony Orchestra in York, Pennsylvania.

In 1957, Bernstein appointed Mandell to become part of the creative team for his newly planned televised Young People's Concerts. In 1958, Mandell was also named music director of the Philadelphia Little Symphony, both of whom he performed with in Philadelphia and New York, and the Westchester Symphony in Westchester County, New York.

Between 1955 and 1967, Mandell was executive music director of the North Shore Music Theatre in Beverly, Massachusetts. Between 1961 and 1968, he recorded over 50 LP discs in London for Reader's Digest Records under a variety of pseudonyms, including Eric Hammerstein, Johnny Gibbs, Ray Thomas, Juan Ramirez, Pablo Mendez, Dick Mahi, The Button-Down Brass, The Romantic Saxophones and Strings, and The Collegians. In 1968 Mandell took up residency with his family in England. He concentrated his career initially in musical theater and then on bringing popular classical concerts to a new audience through his "Concerts for the Family" series.

In 1972, Mandell became the music director for the Anthony Newley and Leslie Bricusse musical The Good Old Bad Old Days, which ran for 309 performances at London's Prince of Wales Theatre. In 1973 Mandell became executive music director at the city of Leicester's newly opened Haymarket Theatre, which launched a number of major international revivals of musicals such as Joseph and The Amazing Technicolour Dreamcoat and Cameron Mackintosh's tour of Oliver!, prior to its London West End opening. (Note: The Theatre was known for mounting large-scale musicals both home grown and in collaboration with Cameron Mackintosh, such as Oliver!, My Fair Lady, and Oklahoma. Musicals of note under Mandell's musical direction were: Joseph And The Amazing Technicolour Dreamcoat, produced several times at the Haymarket, in 1974, 1975, 1976, 1978, Guys and Dolls (1975) (co-directed by Robin Midgely and Robert Mandell), The Boy Friend (1976) (directed by Alexander Dore and featuring Elaine Paige), Oliver (1977) (directed by Robin Midgley featuring Roy Hudd, which was the first remounting of the original London production using Sean Kenny's revolving set), and Camelot) From 1974, Mandell designed musical entertainments for the concert hall.

In 1975, Mandell began what became a regular series of guest tenures with The City of Birmingham Symphony Orchestra to promote a new series of "Concerts for the Family" and young people's concerts. (Note: From Covent Garden to Broadway was performed on July 18, 1975, at Birmingham Town Hall with soloist Lois McDonall, the CBSO and the CBSO Chorus as the first of a series of themed concerts that pioneered concert programs of classical and popular theatre music in the UK aimed at family audiences instead of traditional concert-going audiences.)

After acquiring a major classical theatrical and light entertainment music library of over 1,000 orchestrations in 1976 from the estate of the British composer and arranger George Melachrino, Mandell launched a national family concert program conducting a reestablished Melachrino strings and orchestra ensamblee, with whom he toured the UK nationally annually until 2000. In May 2012, Mandell published an extended musical memoir of Bernstein, entitled West Side Maestro.

Mandell died in Leicester in April 2020, at the age of 90. He had been admitted to hospital following a fall and had tested positive for COVID-19 during the COVID-19 pandemic in England.
