= Neal Kenyon =

Neal Kenyon (December 6, 1929 – December 19, 2008) was an American theatre director, choreographer, and actor.

Born in Hammond, Indiana, Kenyon graduated from Louisiana State University with a degree in theatre. He began his career working in television, and then made his off-Broadway stage debut in 1958 in The Boy Friend.

He directed and choreographed both off-Broadway and Broadway shows in the 1970s. He then began a teaching career, at Florida State University (FSU) in Sarasota, Florida from 1976 to 1981, and then at FSU in Tallahassee.

Kenyon received the Drama Desk Award for directing the off-Broadway musical Dames at Sea.
