= Roberta Sklar =

American activist

- Occupations: Activist, theatre director
- Organization: OutRight Action International
- Spouse: Sondra Segal
- Children: 2

Roberta Sklar is an American activist, feminist and award-winning theatre director. She is currently a communications consultant and senior strategist for OutRight Action International (née IGLHRC)and other LGBT Rights advocacy organizations . She formerly served as Director of Communications for The International Gay and Lesbian Human Rights Commission, The National Gay and Lesbian Task Force and the Empire State Pride Agenda. Sklar has provided strategic communications consulting to social justice domestic and international organizations.

As a theater director she was the co director of major works (The Serpent, Terminal, the Mutation show, Endgame ) at the Open Theater (1968–1972), and co artistic director of the Women's Experimental Theater with Clare Coss and Sondra Segal (1976–1986). The women's experimental theater produced three original trilogies: The Daughters Cycle: Daughters, Sister/ Sister, and Electra Speaks; and Women's Body and other Natural Resources: Food, Food Talk and Feast or Famine).

Sklar and long-time partner Sondra Segal, a playwright, poet, and essayist, were married in Vancouver, British Columbia in 2003. They have two children and reside in NYC.
