= Dames at Sea =

1966 American musical parody

- Original cast recording
- Music: Jim Wise
- Lyrics: George Haimsohn; Robin Miller
- Book: George Haimsohn; Robin Miller
- Productions: 1966 Off-Off-Broadway; 1968 Off-Broadway; 1969 West End; 1973 Lake Forest, Illinois; 1985 Off-Broadway revival 1989 West End revival 2004 Off-Broadway revival 2015 Broadway
- Awards: 1968 Drama Desk Award for Outstanding Lyrics

Dames at Sea is a 1966 musical with book and lyrics by George Haimsohn and Robin Miller and music by Jim Wise.

The musical is a parody of large, flashy 1930s Busby Berkeley-style movie musicals in which a chorus girl, newly arrived off the bus from the Midwest to New York City, steps into a role on Broadway and becomes a star. It originally played Off-Off-Broadway in 1966 at the Caffe Cino and then played Off-Broadway, starring newcomer Bernadette Peters, beginning in 1968 for a successful run. The show has enjoyed a London run, a television adaptation and a number of revivals, before its Broadway premiere in October 2015.

== Production history ==
The musical was originally a short sketch, based loosely on the Gold Diggers movies, written by George Haimsohn, Jim Wise, and Robin Miller. The character of "Ruby" was suggested by the Ruby Keeler-type from those early movies. It was lengthened to a 50-minute production, and director Robert Dahdah prepared it for its first staging. After the original actress who was to play "Ruby" withdrew during rehearsals, choreographer Don Price recommended newcomer Bernadette Peters for the role. The show opened in May 1966 as Dames at Sea, or Golddiggers Afloat at the Caffe Cino, a small coffee house/performance space in New York City's Greenwich Village, where it continued for 148 performances. The original Caffe Cino cast featured Peters as Ruby, Joe McGuire as Frank, David Christmas as Dick, Jill Roberts as Joan, Norma Bigtree as Mona and Gary Filsinger as the Director and Captain. Peters was replaced by her sister, Donna Forbes (now DeSeta) during the run.

Retitled simply Dames at Sea, the musical re-opened at the Bouwerie Lane Theatre on December 20, 1968, and transferred to the larger Theater de Lys on April 22, 1969, and closed on May 10, 1970, after a total of 575 performances. Directed and choreographed by Neal Kenyon, the show again featured Peters in the role of Ruby and David Christmas as Dick. The cast also featured Steve Elmore as the Captain, Tamara Long as Mona Kent, Joseph R. Sicari as Lucky, and Sally Stark as Joan. After Peters left the show, the role of "Ruby" was played by Loni Ackerman, Bonnie Franklin, Janie Sell, Barbara Sharma, and Pia Zadora.

On August 27, 1969, the show opened at London's Duchess Theatre, where it ran for 127 performances. The West End production was filmed for the television program Theatre Date, and was broadcast on BBC1 on November 4, 1969.

Peters appeared in a regional production at the Paper Mill Playhouse in Millburn, New Jersey in early 1973. In July 1973, Peters appeared again as Ruby at the Academy Playhouse, Lake Forest, Illinois. Subsequent revivals have been staged at the Lamb's Theatre in Manhattan (1985) (with Stephen Flaherty playing the piano), the Haymarket Theatre, Leicester, London (1989), and at the theater where the musical first played off-Broadway, the Bouwerie Lane Theatre, produced by Jean Cocteau Repertory and directed by David Fuller, from September 3, 2004, to November 28, 2004.

The show began previews on Broadway on September 24, 2015, and officially opened on October 22 at the Helen Hayes Theatre, with direction and choreography by Randy Skinner. A workshop for this production was held in January 2014, with Laura Osnes, Rachel York, Mara Davi, John Bolton, Cary Tedder, and Danny Gardner. The Broadway cast featured John Bolton as The Captain/Hennesey, Mara Davi as Joan, Danny Gardner as Lucky, Eloise Kropp as Ruby, Lesli Margherita as Mona Kent and Cary Tedder as Dick. The show was described as "a tap-happy gem of a show that celebrates the golden era of movie musicals". Among the producers were Infinity Theatre Company and Perry Street Theatricals. The show was produced in 2012 by Infinity Theatre Company, Annapolis, Maryland, with direction and choreography by Randy Skinner. This production closed on January 3, 2016, after 85 performances and 32 previews.

The musical is popular for schools and has been produced in many countries.

== Plot ==
In the early 1930s, a Broadway musical is in rehearsal. Mona Kent is its temperamental diva star, Joan a wise-cracking chorus girl, and Hennesy the producer/manager/director. The naive Ruby arrives from Utah, with "nothing but tap shoes in her suitcase and a prayer in her heart", determined to be a Broadway star. She promptly faints into the arms of Dick, a sailor and aspiring songwriter ("It's You"). Ruby gets a job in the chorus, but Hennesy informs the cast that the theater must be torn down, and they must find another place, which turns out to be a ship, for the show. Joan and Lucky, another sailor and her former boyfriend, renew their romance ("Choo-Choo Honeymoon") while Ruby admits her feelings for Dick ("The Sailor of My Dreams"). Dick and Lucky persuade their Captain to volunteer the use of their ship ("Dames at Sea"). Mona recognizes the Captain as a former boyfriend ("The Beguine"). When Mona kisses Dick, to persuade him to give her one of his songs, Ruby notices and becomes despondent ("Raining In My Heart"). Dick explains the misunderstanding and the couple make up ("There's Something About You"). While rehearsing on the actual ship, Mona becomes seasick ("The Echo Waltz"); Ruby steps in to save the show and becomes a star ("Star Tar"). The three couples decide to marry ("Let's Have A Simple Wedding").

=== Other elements ===
John Wilson in The New York Times pointed out that the music is a mixture of parody, such as the torch song "That Mister Man", pastiche ("Raining in My Heart"), and the real thing. Wilson wrote that "The pastiche songs, built around phrases borrowed from or close to actual songs of the genre, usually project an appealing period flavor." The joke was that, while spoofing the large, lavish movie musicals, Dames at Sea did it with a cast of six, two pianos and percussion, and a tiny stage.

In the 2015 Broadway production, director Randy Skinner noted that this was "the first time in New York that 'Dames at Sea' will be heard with an orchestra, and the show will have more dancing than ever before with all new dance and vocal arrangements by Rob Berman". This production opened with movie credits projected onto a screen, reproducing exactly the font used by Warner Bros. in the early 1930s. Skinner received a 2016 Tony Award nomination for his choreography.

== Musical numbers ==
Act I

- "Overture"
- "Wall Street" - Mona
- "It's You" - Dick and Ruby
- "Broadway Baby" - Dick
- "That Mister Man of Mine" - Mona and Company
- "Choo-Choo Honeymoon" - Joan and Lucky
- "The Sailor of My Dreams" - Ruby
- "Singapore Sue" - Lucky and Company
- "Broadway Baby" (reprise) - Hennesey
- "Good Times Are Here to Stay" - Mona, Joan and Company

Act II

- "Dames at Sea" - Company
- "The Beguine" - Mona and Captain
- "Raining in My Heart" - Ruby and Company
- "There's Something About You" - Dick and Ruby
- "Raining in My Heart" (reprise) - Ruby
- "The Echo Waltz" - Mona, Joan, Ruby and Company
- "Star Tar" - Ruby and Company
- "Let's Have a Simple Wedding" - Company

== Major casts ==
Character	Original Off-Off-Broadway (1966)	Original Off-Broadway (1968)	TV movie (1971)	Workshop (2014)	Original Broadway (2015)
Ruby	Bernadette Peters	Bernadette Peters	Ann-Margret	Laura Osnes	Eloise Kropp
Dick	David Christmas	David Christmas	Harvey Evans	Cary Tedder	Cary Tedder
Joan	Jill Roberts	Sally Stark	Anne Meara	Mara Davi	Mara Davi
Lucky	Joe McGuire*	Joseph R. Sicari	Dick Shawn	Danny Gardner	Danny Gardner
Mona	Norma Bigtree	Tamara Long	Ann Miller	Rachel York	Lesli Margherita
Hennessy/The Captain	Gary Filsinger	Steve Elmore	Fred Gwynne	John Bolton	John Bolton

*In this production, Lucky was called "Frank".

== Critical response ==
In his review in The New York Times of the 1968 production, Clive Barnes wrote "'Dames At Sea' is a real winner, a little gem of a musical. The show is wonderfully helped by its cast. The star I suppose is Bernadette Peters as the wholly sweetly silly small-town chorine who taps her way from the bus station to stardom in 24 hours." Walter Kerr, in his Sunday Times feature article, added "You'll find the show cheerful and ingratiating, I think ... Miss Peters is a real find ... She is extremely funny, and endearing on top of that." The Time magazine review noted that the show had "three thoroughly engaging stars and some of the most ingenious staging currently on or off Broadway. Tamara Long, as the slinky heavy, brandishes a flaming Morganitic torch for her Mister Man, and Sally Stark, as Ruby's peroxided pal, belts a note almost as plangent as the great Merman's. The comic delight of the show, though, is Bernadette Peters, whose Ruby can simultaneously sing and dance up a storm that puts all New York (including Queen Mane of Rumania) at her feet."

The review of the production at the Off-Broadway Bouwerie Lane Theatre (2004) in the Gay City News:

Director David Fuller has filled his production with such subtle touches, which make the show seem intriguingly contemporary, and far from the saccharine and serious treatments this chestnut usually receives, he's restored the true Off-Broadway spirit that used the establishment's own forms to tweak its foibles. First staged during the Vietnam War era, the musical seems more relevant than ever as it takes precise aim at the sunny outlook that comes from near-psychotic denial of reality.

The review praises the cast: "The cast does a great job ... Individually, Kathleen White as Ruby is deliciously comic, with expressions and physical comedies that recall Lucille Ball ... Chrysten Peddie as Joan has the tough dame attitude down cold. She's got a warm presence, is a great dancer and has a strong voice."

The USA Today reviewer of the 2015 production wrote: "So why bring this trifle to Broadway, for the first time, 49 years after its downtown premiere? Never mind; just check your cares and pretensions at the door of the Helen Hayes Theatre, ... and prepare to be thoroughly charmed. Through it all, happily, Skinner keeps everyone dancing, providing exuberant tap routines that his cast executes with joyful facility."

Steven Suskin, in reviewing for the Huffington Post wrote: "The surprise, today, is that the show remains viable; this first Broadway production is impeccably staged and loaded with entertainment, and should delight its target audience ... The songs ... hit all the bases, reminding us of all those wonderful Harry Warren songs; but they are mostly lightweight pastiches, never quite as memorable as the real thing. The show--which was heretofore performed with two pianos and a drummer--is now fully orchestrated."

== Television ==
An adaptation for television starred Ann-Margret as Ruby, Ann Miller as Mona, Anne Meara as Joan, Harvey Evans as Dick, Fred Gwynne as Hennesy and Dick Shawn as the Captain. It was broadcast on the Bell System Family Theater on NBC on November 15, 1971. The cast had extra chorus girls and boys, and there were full production numbers, turning into the very thing it was spoofing. Ann Miller was singled out for praise, especially when "she was allowed to tap out her brassy impersonation of the temperamental star".

== Recording ==
The original off-Broadway Cast Recording was released in 1969 by Columbia Masterworks Records (Columbia OS 3330) and issued on CD by Sony. The Original London Cast Recording is also available on CD.

== Awards and nominations ==
=== Original Off-Broadway production ===
Year	Award Ceremony	Category	Nominee	Result
1968	Drama Desk Award	Outstanding Performance	Bernadette Peters	Won
1968	Drama Desk Award	Outstanding Director of a Musical	Neal Kenyon	Won
1968	Drama Desk Award	Outstanding Lyrics	George Haimsohn and Robin Miller	Won
1968	Outer Critics Circle Award	Best Off-Broadway Musical		Won

=== Broadway ===
Year	Award Ceremony	Category	Nominee	Result
2016	Tony Award	Best Choreography	Randy Skinner	Nominated
2016	Drama Desk Award	Outstanding Choreography	Randy Skinner	Nominated
2016	Outer Critics Circle Award	Outstanding Revival of a Musical		Nominated
2016	Outer Critics Circle Award	Outstanding Choreography	Randy Skinner	Nominated
2016	Fred and Adele Astaire Awards	Outstanding Female Dancer in a Broadway Show	Eloise Kropp	Nominated
2016	Fred and Adele Astaire Awards	Outstanding Female Dancer in a Broadway Show	Mara Davi	Nominated
2016	Fred and Adele Astaire Awards	Outstanding Choreographer in a Broadway Show	Randy Skinner	Nominated
2016	Fred and Adele Astaire Awards	Outstanding Ensemble in a Broadway Show	John Bolton, Mara Davi, Danny Gardner, Eloise Kropp, Lesli Margherita, Cary Tedder	Nominated
