= George Haimsohn =

- George Haimsohn at the Caffe Cino circa 1966

Background information
- Born: June 6, 1925; St. Louis, Missouri, U.S.
- Died: January 17, 2003 (aged 77) New York City, New York, U.S.
- Genre: Musical theatre
- Occupation: Librettist

George Haimsohn (June 12, 1925 – January 17, 2003) was an American writer and photographer. He was best known for co-writing the book and libretto of the popular 1960s Off-Broadway musical Dames at Sea. He produced male nude and "physique photography" under the name Plato, and wrote a number of gay male erotic novels under the name Alexander Goodman.

== Biography ==
Haimsohn was born in St. Louis, Missouri. He served in the U.S. Navy during World War 2, and subsequently graduated from the University of California at Berkeley. In 1952 he moved to Greenwich Village, New York City.

In the mid-1960s, he anonymously wrote The Gay Coloring Book and My Trip Around the World, comedic picture books illustrated by Dom Orejudos (a.k.a. "Etienne"), depicting the social and sex lives of contemporary gay men living in the Village. He also wrote and illustrated Modern Fairy Tales: Autobiography of a Camp under the pseudonym Peter B. Luvvly.

In 1966 he co-wrote with Robin Miller the book and libretto for the musical Dames at Sea, with music by Jim Wise. The original Off-Off-Broadway production launched the career of Bernadette Peters. Dames was adapted into a 1971 TV production starring Ann-Margret. His other musicals were Now, Zing! and Johnny American.

He wrote erotic short stories and novels for gay male readers in the mid-1960s, under the pen name Alexander Goodman. His published books include The Soft Spot: Four Short Stories (1964), A Sliver of Flesh: Four New Short Stories of the Homosexual Life (1965), Carnal Matters: Four Short Stories (1965), Handsome Is... (1966), Mercenary Affections: Stories of the Homosexual Life (1966), A Sweet Gentle Boy and Other Stories (1967), The First Time: Five Short Stories (1967), Blaze of Summer (1967), The Gay Psychedelic Sex Book: Collages and Limericks (1967), A Summer on Fire Island (1968), and Happyland and Other Stories (1968).

In the 1980s, he wrote and illustrated The Portable Hamlet, The Bedside Faust, and Inside Romeo and Juliet, comedic illustrated retellings of the classic works, for college readers.
