= Jim Wise (composer) =

American composer and English professor

Jim Wise (April 24, 1919 – November 13, 2000) was an American musical composer and English professor. He is known for the musical Dames at Sea, as well as his contributions to the New Jersey Institute of Technology's Theater.

== Early life ==
Wise was born in Akron, Ohio in 1919 as James Newton Wise. After graduating from Wooster College in 1941 with a degree in Classical Languages, he served in the Army’s Public Relations Division during World War II. He began his M.A. in English Literature at Columbia University upon returning to the U.S. in 1946. Wise completed his M.A. in 1948 and taught at Columbia’s School of General Studies from 1950–1952.

== Career ==
He began working at Newark College of Engineering (NJIT) (now known as New Jersey Institute of Technology) in 1955, where he taught English and Drama until his retirement in 1989.

In May 1966, Dames at Sea opened off-off-Broadway at the Café Cino, located in Greenwich Village, under the title Dames at Sea or Golddiggers Afloat. The musical is parody of musicals from the 1920s and 1930s, Dames at Sea. Newcomer Bernadette Peters, starring as “Ruby", got her start in this musical. The musical re-opened under the title Dames at Sea in the Off-Broadway Bouwerie Lane Theatre on December 20, 1968 and then transferred to the Theatre De Lys on April 22, 1969, where it played until its closing on May 10, 1970, with a total of 575 performances. The musical won the 1969 Outer Critics Circle Award, Best Off-Broadway Musical. Dames at Sea was revived at Manhattan’s Lamb’s Theatre in 1985, at NJIT in 1989, and on Broadway in 2015.

In 1988 Wise founded the Allardice-Wise Scholarship at Wooster College in memory of his friend and classmate James B. Allardice. The scholarship continues to be awarded, on the basis of a competitive audition, to a senior Theatre major who has demonstrated exceptional talent and interest in theatre. During his lifetime, Wise sat in on the auditions and helped pick the scholars.

He endowed an annual scholarship at NJIT "to students with outstanding academic records and contributions to NJIT Theatre." A theatre at NJIT is named for him.

Wise wrote the musical Yankee Ingenuity in 1976, and the children's musical Olaf Who Never Walked But Always Danced with Don Price, in 1997. He also wrote "specialty material" for performers including Dodi Goodman and Gloria DeHaven.
