= Marvin Felix Camillo =

American theater director and actor

Marvin Felix Camillo (1937 in Newark, New Jersey – January 22, 1988 in La Rochelle, France) was an American theater director and actor, noted for his founding of The Family theater company, a group in New York largely made up of ex-convicts.

== Stage productions ==
- Short Eyes (1974)
- The Cool World (1960)
