= Jan Sargent =

British director and writer

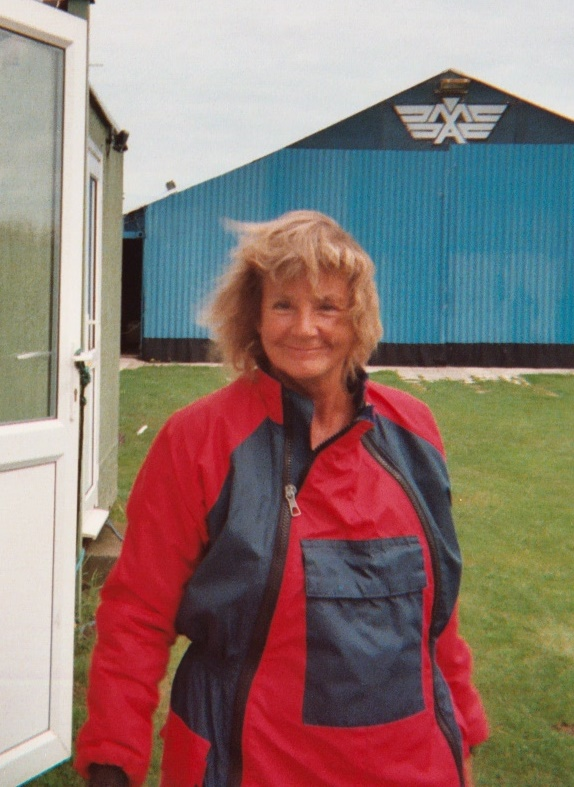

Jan Sargent is a British director and writer of television, film, and theatre. One of her best known productions is Arthur Miller's The Price at the Bristol Old Vic. She has also directed episodes of Where the Heart Is, Backup, Dangerfield, The Bill, Ruth Rendell Mysteries, Soldier Soldier, Casualty, Big Deal, Truckers, Black Silk, Desmonds, Births Marriages & Deaths and Small Change. She is married to actor George Irving.
