= The Bishops Fee, Leicester =

Manorial estate

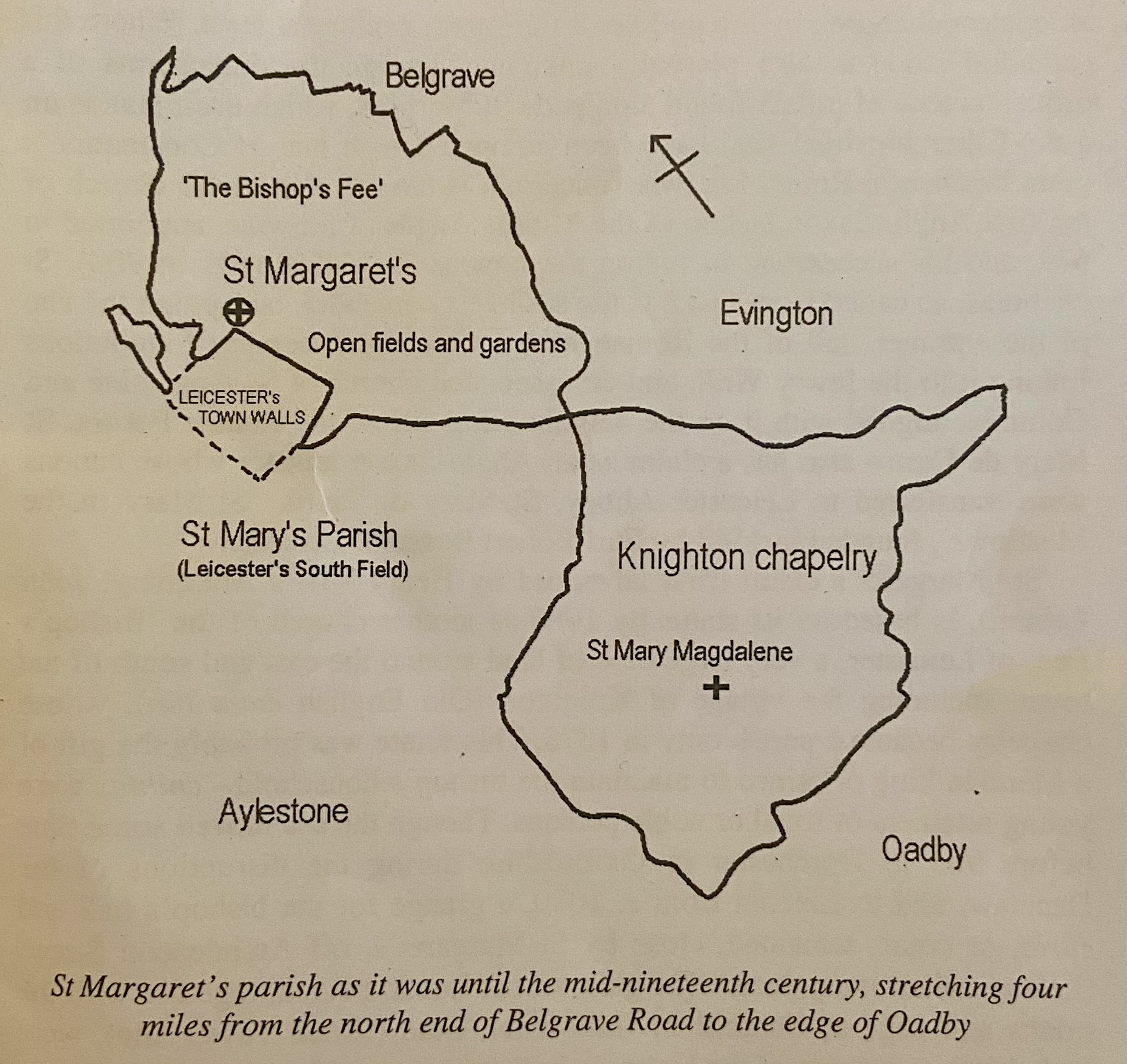
Bishops Fee estate and St Margaret's Parish, Leicester

The Bishops Fee was a large manorial estate and administrative liberty surrounding the north and east Leicester old town. From at least 1087 until 1547 it was owned by the Bishop of Lincoln, one of his endowment estates. It consisted of 2,658 acres and included the two major suburbs outside the northern and eastern town gates. The territory is now covered by many of the eastern and northern suburbs of the modern city of Leicester. First recorded in Domesday Book in 1086 as 10 carucates of land, it is possible it predates this and some sources have suggested the estate was Anglo Saxon in origin. During the English Reformation in 1547 the estate was appropriated from the Diocese of Lincoln by the Crown and sold to subsequent landlords. Its parish church was the Prebendal Church of St Margaret outside the north eastern corner of the old Roman and medieval walls and was administered from a local episcopal curia (or grange) probably situated next to the church.

== Territory ==
The estate consisted of two large territories, the northern one, containing all of Leicesters principal medieval suburbs and most of its farm land, and the southern one, centred around Knighton which formed a separate chapelry.

=== Northern Estate ===
The northern estate, known as the Bishops Fee proper, consisted of 1,138 acres and extended between the River Soar and the parishes of Belgrave and Evington surrounding Leicester on part of its north, the whole of its east, and part of its south walls. Today it covers many of Leicesters eastern suburbs and its north central suburbs including the area around Belgrave Road, St Matthew’s, Spinney Hills, Highfields, and London Road.

=== Southern Estate (Knighton) ===
The second estate, known as the Knighton Chapelry, consisted of 1,520 acres situated between the parishes of Evington, Oadby, and Ayleston centred on the ancient village of Knighton. Today the large housing estates which have now surrounded historic Knighton as well as the neighbourhoods of Clarendon Park, Stoneygate, South Knighton, West Knighton, and parts of Saffron Lane are all situated on this former estate. Together these territories make up most of the suburbs east of the river soar in the modern city with the exception of Ayleston, Belgrave, and Evington. As a result most post Industrial Revolution parishes in Leicester are daughter churches of St Margaret’s with parishes carved out of the Bishops Fee parish.

== History ==
=== Origins ===
The origins of the Bishops Fee are shady. Historians until the 20th century assumed that the estate was granted by one of the Mercian kings sometime between 679, when the Bishopric of Leicester was created for Cuthwine, and 874, when Ceobred the last Bishop fled to Dorchester. It is also possible that the estate was granted by Ethelfleda or an English king to the exiled Bishopric of Leicester and Lindsey which had been combined with Dorchester following the Danish invasion sometime after the Saxon reconquest of 918. However, the Victoria County History notes there is no surviving record of a pre Norman grant. It is therefore entirely possible that the Bishops Fee was granted during the division of land after the Norman conquest when the Bishopric of Dorchester, the combined sees of Leicester, Lindsey, and Dorchester, was transferred to Lincoln in 1072 by Bishop Remigius de Fécamp. Whenever it was granted it appears clearly in its entirety in Domesday Book in 1086.

=== Conflict with the Earls and Borough of Leicester ===
The adjacency of so large an episcopal estate to both the borough of Leicester and the estate of the Earls of Leicester caused great friction both with the Earldom and the borough corporation. From around 1143 the Earls persistently tried to gain control of the area of the Bishops Fee just outside East Gates, including Belgrave Gate and Humberstone Gate. Eventually in 1217 the dispute between the Earl and the Bishop was resolved by an agreement. However difficulties between the Bishop of Lincoln and the Borough persisted. In 1322, Belgrave Gate was ruled to be part of the Borough and therefore subject to its taxation. Humberstone Gate, Church Gate, and Gallowtree Gate were also included in the Boroughs territory in time however personal disputes over tax from residents on the basis of the joint Bishops Fee and Borough status of their property persisted into the modern age. The vast majority of the territory was still free of financial exactions from the Borough until it gradually urbanised in the 19th century. The privileges of independence of the St Margaret's Vestry Committee in Leicesters suburbs were only partly done away with in 1835 and lingered in certain forms (such as the sessions Prebendal Court) for many years.

=== Feudal justice in the Bishops Fee ===
It is highly likely that the gallows referenced in the street name Gallowtree Gate are those of the Bishops Fee rather than the Borough of Leicester. The street, running along the old town east wall and now one of Leicester's principal shopping streets, was part of a route starting at the prebendal manor house near St Margaret's, running along the east wall of Leicester up Church Gate, past East Gate, Gallowtree Gate, and up to the area on St Mary’s Hill where Victoria Park is now situated. The gallows stood roughly at the top of what is now London Road opposite the London Road Entrance to Victoria Park. All of these places were on Bishops Fee land.

=== Knighton Chapelry ===
The southern estate centred on the settlement of Knighton. This village was served by the Church of St Mary Magdalen, which for most of its history was a chapel of ease dependent on St Margaret’s. It is now one of the areas parish churches however it remained a chapel under the authority of the Prebendary of St Margaret's until the late 19th century king after the crown took possession of the estates.

=== Crown appropriation and estate history 1547-1877 ===
In 1547 during the English Reformation, the 1,520 acre southern part of the Bishops Fee served by the Knighton Chapelry was given to The Crown by the Diocese of Lincoln. The Crown seemed probably held onto the estate until it was sold to William Parr, Marquis of Northampton in 1571. In 1583 the queen was holding it again and it was known as the Queens Manor in the Bishops Fee. It was sold 6 years later to some local burghers. Later owners would include Sir Henry Harrington, Sir Richard Morrison, and then the Earls of Devonshire until the end of the 17th century. (fn. 82) After 1683 the descent is lost until 1764 when the manor was in the hands of Lord William Manners. Later sold to the Earls of Dysart, they remained the owners until 1877, when the corporation of Leicester purchased the remainder of the estate, by then reduced to just 92 acres.

== See also ==
- Leicester
- Timeline of Leicester
- St Margaret's Church, Leicester
