= Queens Road =

Queens Road or Queen's Road may refer to:

- Queens Road, Leicester, England
- Queen's Road, Richmond, England
- Queens Road, Peckham, Southwark, England
  - Queens Road Peckham railway station, Southwark, England
  - Nunhead and Queen's Road (ward), Southwark
- Queens Road, Walthamstow, England
- Queen's Road, Cambridge, England
- Queen's Road, Brighton, England
- Queen's Road, Hong Kong
- Queen's Road, Gibraltar
- Queen's Road, Belfast
