= Knighton, Leicester =

Area of Leicester, England

Coordinates: 52.606°N 1.116°W

Knighton
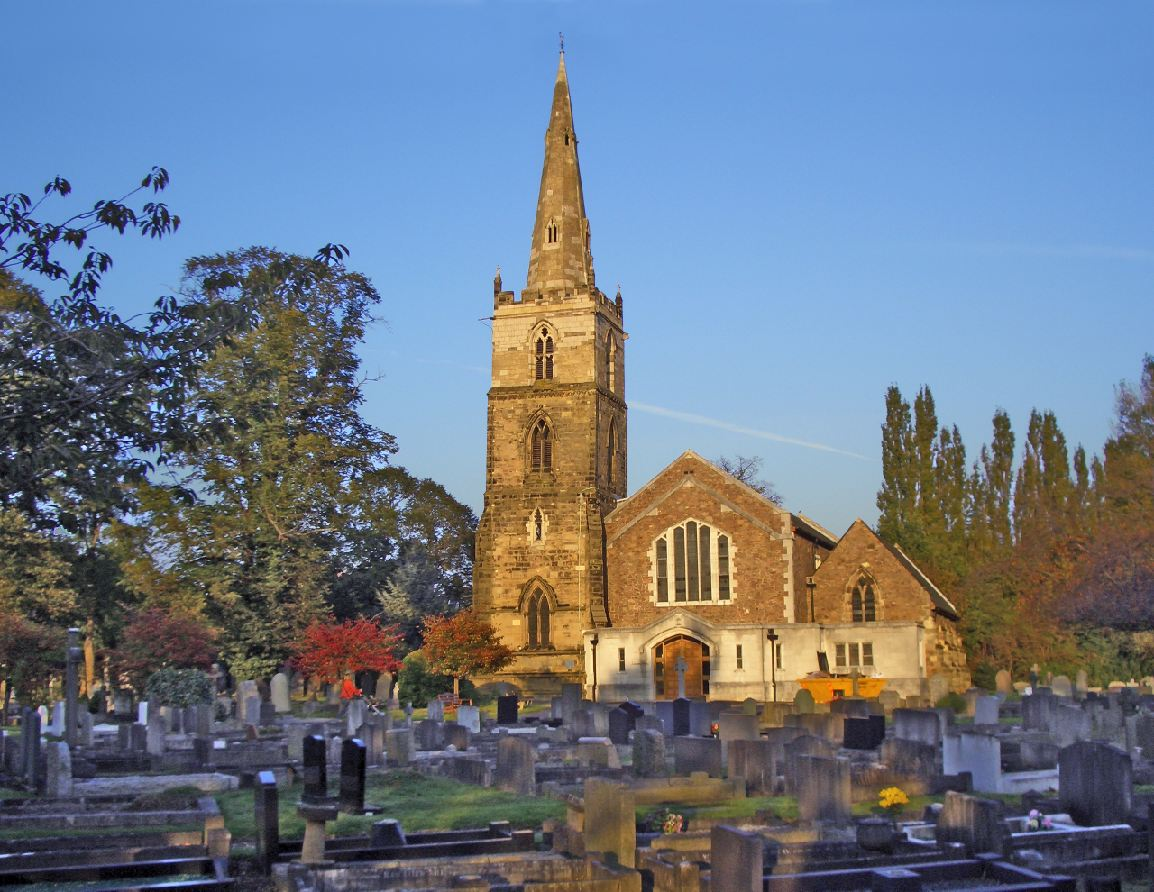
- St Mary Magdalen Church and churchyard cemetery, Knighton, Leicester

- Location within Leicestershire
- Population: 16,805 (2011 census)
- Unitary authority: Leicester
- Shire county: Leicestershire
- Region: East Midlands
- Country: England
- Sovereign state: United Kingdom
- Post town: LEICESTER
- Postcode district: LE2
- Dialling code: 0116
- UK Parliament: Leicester South

Map showing locations around Knighton. The shaded area shows the Leicester city boundary.

Knighton is a residential suburban area of Leicester, in the ceremonial county of Leicestershire, England. It situated between Clarendon Park to the north, Stoneygate to the east, Oadby and Wigston to the south and the Saffron Lane estate to the west.

Originally a separate village a couple of miles from Leicester city centre, it became linked to it by the areas known as Stoneygate and Clarendon Park during the Victorian period, due to the demand for housing for those newly employed in industry. It still retains several of the village's original buildings, such as Oram Cottage and the Church of St Mary Magdalen; the village core is now a conservation area.

== Population ==
The population at the 2011 census was 16,805. but the Knighton census ward differs significantly from the Knighton neighbourhood area. A portion of Stoneygate is included. The ancient parish had a population of 383 in 1831, rising to 6,075 by 1891, after the first wave of Leicester's Victorian expansion into the northern part of the parish. Knighton itself saw much building in the 1930s and 1940s with red-brick semi-detached houses. The village as a suburb expanded further in the mid-20th century with the building of the housing estates of West Knighton and South Knighton. These two estates have a mix of housing of the post-war era.

== History ==
Knighton was named in the Domesday Book of 1086 (where it is spelled Cnihetone, and gives a picture of a fairly large village of 24 households and substantial farmlands, part of wider manorial estate known as The Bishops Fee under the lordship of the Bishops of Lincoln, who at the time of the Doomsday Survey was a Norman cleric named Remigius de Fécamp. It functioned as a civil parish between Leicester and Wigston Magna, with an identity separate from the town of Leicester until the end of the 19th century. Ecclesiastically, it was a chapelry of St Margaret's Church, Leicester and appears to have been so since before the Norman conquest. Both St Margaret's, Leicester and St Mary Magdelene, Knighton, were held by the Bishop of Lincoln, and from the 13th century St Margaret's was a prebendary church of Lincoln Cathedral, and thus had considerable autonomy compared to Leicester's other ecclesiastical parishes, which were all held by Leicester Abbey. The tithes and glebe lands at Knighton were thus in the hands of the vicar of St Margaret's. Although Knighton Church dates back to at least the 13th century, it was served by a curate, and did not have its own vicar until it was made a separate ecclesiastical parish in 1878.

The medieval parish had four substantial open fields, and the village economy was centred on agricultural activity. Until the Enclosure award of 1756 these four open fields, named Stockwell, Safforn, Goldhill, and the Breach Field, were subdivided into narrow strips that were allocated annually amongst the families in the village. These fields were enclosed in 1756 and divided up permanently between the 14 families that had rights to the land, giving a snapshot of the spread of wealth in the village. 1,520 acres (620 ha) were allocated, in proportion to the size of each family's existing rights. The Craddock family, who by this time were the Lords of the Manor, received almost 700 acres. Of the other families, Edward Inge received 260 acres, the Foster and Johnson families each received well over 100 acres, leaving the other 10 families to share 300 acres between them.

=== Growth of Stoneygate ===
Knighton retained its agricultural character into the 19th century, whilst Leicester to the north and Wigston to the south were becoming centres of the framework knitting cottage industry. The first effects of the expansion of Leicester were felt, not in the village itself, but in the area of the parish that became known as Stoneygate. Suburban development had its beginnings in the 1770s and 80s with a substantial private dwelling called Stoneygate House, on what later became Toller Road, followed by the conversion of a farmhouse on the Harborough Turnpike, (now London Road) into a 'gentleman's residence' called The Stoney Gate. By the 1840s there were 10 houses strung along the London Road, occupied by some of Leicester's most prosperous tradesmen and industrialists. The trend of wealthy clients getting a house built for their own use continued up to 1863, by which time there were 32 such spacious mansions. From 1865 the side roads began to be opened up, developed by speculative builders, and a more rapid expansion and infilling got underway.

=== Clarendon Park ===
From 1875 the estate that had formerly been The Breach Field, in Knighton's open field days, began to be sold off for development. The density of housing was greater than in Stoneygate, and many streets were laid out with rows of brick terraces, and acquired the name Clarendon Park, apparently as a marketing device. By 1888 Clarendon Park's road layout was substantially complete and built up. Queen's Road and Clarendon Park Road were provided with shops and other community facilities. Large, well-funded churches were rapidly established both in Clarendon Park and to a lesser extent Stoneygate. Among these were St John the Baptist Anglican Church (1885), London Road Congregational (1886), Queen's Road Primitive Methodist (1887), Clarendon Park Road Baptist (1894), St Michael and All Angels Anglican (1898), Clarendon Park Road Wesleyan Methodist (1901 replacing an 1886 mission hall), Salvation Army (1901) and Stoneygate Baptist (1905).

=== Boundary changes ===
The historic parish occupied a broad swathe of land on the southern border of Leicester. From Safron lane in the west, it was roughly 2.8 miles (4.5 km) wide, extending to the Gartree Road in the east.

Knighton was formerly a chapelry in St Margaret parish, from 1866 Knighton was a civil parish in its own right until it was abolished on 26 March 1896 and merged with Leicester.

== Knighton Park ==
Knighton Park forms the southern part of the neighbourhood, south of the A563 Palmerston Way. The 78 acres (32 ha) park was bought from the Craddock-Hartopp trustees by Leicester city council in the late 1930s but wartime prevented its conversion to a public park until 1953. The various compartments and zones within the Park still reflect many of the divisions of the land put in place in 1756 for agricultural improvements when the Knighton open fields were enclosed and subdivided for the first time.

Knighton Spinney is a small area of woodland on the north-east side of the Park, 2.9 hectares (7.2 acres) in extent, that was declared a Local Nature Reserve in 2003. It was planted as a mix of oak and ash trees by Squire Craddock-Hartopp in 1840, as he was concerned about the lack of oaks for shipbuilding. With the shift to iron ships, they were never needed for this purpose, but the spinney was used as a covert for foxhunting. By 1932 the Craddocks could see its wildlife value and covenanted it as a wildlife reserve for all time. It now has a diverse woodland structure, and provides a valuable habitat for spring woodland flowers, birds, mammals and insects.

The park was first awarded the Green Flag Award in 2005. It has a range of amenities, including two play areas, tennis courts, pitch & put (seasonal opening), sensory garden, heath garden. The Wash Brook runs through the park.

== St Thomas More's Catholic Church ==
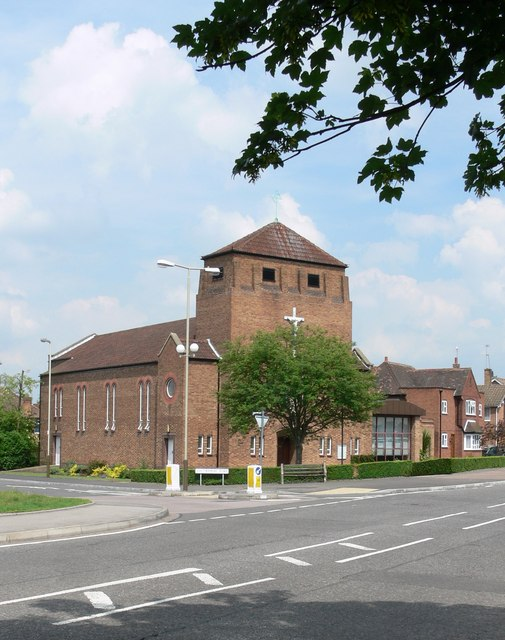
St Thomas More, Knighton Road

The parish of St Thomas More was formed in 1947 and the church was designed in 1948 by the architects Reynolds & Scott, who built a number of parishes in the Diocese of Nottingham. The church was designed in a stripped basilican style. The broad west tower is a recognisable local landmark due to its distinctive nature. Whilst there were a number of Catholic churches within Leicester at the time of the church's construction, St Thomas More's was the first to be built to serve the community of Knighton. The foundation stone was laid by Edward Ellis, Bishop of Nottingham, in 1950. The church was officially opened for use in 1952. The design incorporated a domed baldacchino over the altar and altar rails, all of which have been removed. At the time of the re-ordering which removed the baldacchino, a parish hall was built adjacent to the church. Stained glass windows along the nave of the church include references to key elements of the Roman Catholic faith, with symbolic representations of Christ's ministry and a number of the sacraments.

In the late 1990s to modernise and to make the church suitable to the reforms implemented during the Second Vatican Council the baldacchino, traditional altar, altar rail and marble lectern were replaced with mosaics implanted into the floor of the sanctuary, a mosaic cross was installed in the confessional and new decorational pieces were placed above the new, unusual octagonal altar.

== Notable people ==
- Henry Knighton: wrote a history of England from the Norman conquest until 1396, the year he died.
- Sir William Lindsay Everard: MP, brewer and pioneer aviator.
- Clare Hollingworth: journalist and first person to alert the world that World War II had started
