= Stoneygate =

Suburb of Leicester, England

Coordinates: 52.616°N 1.103°W

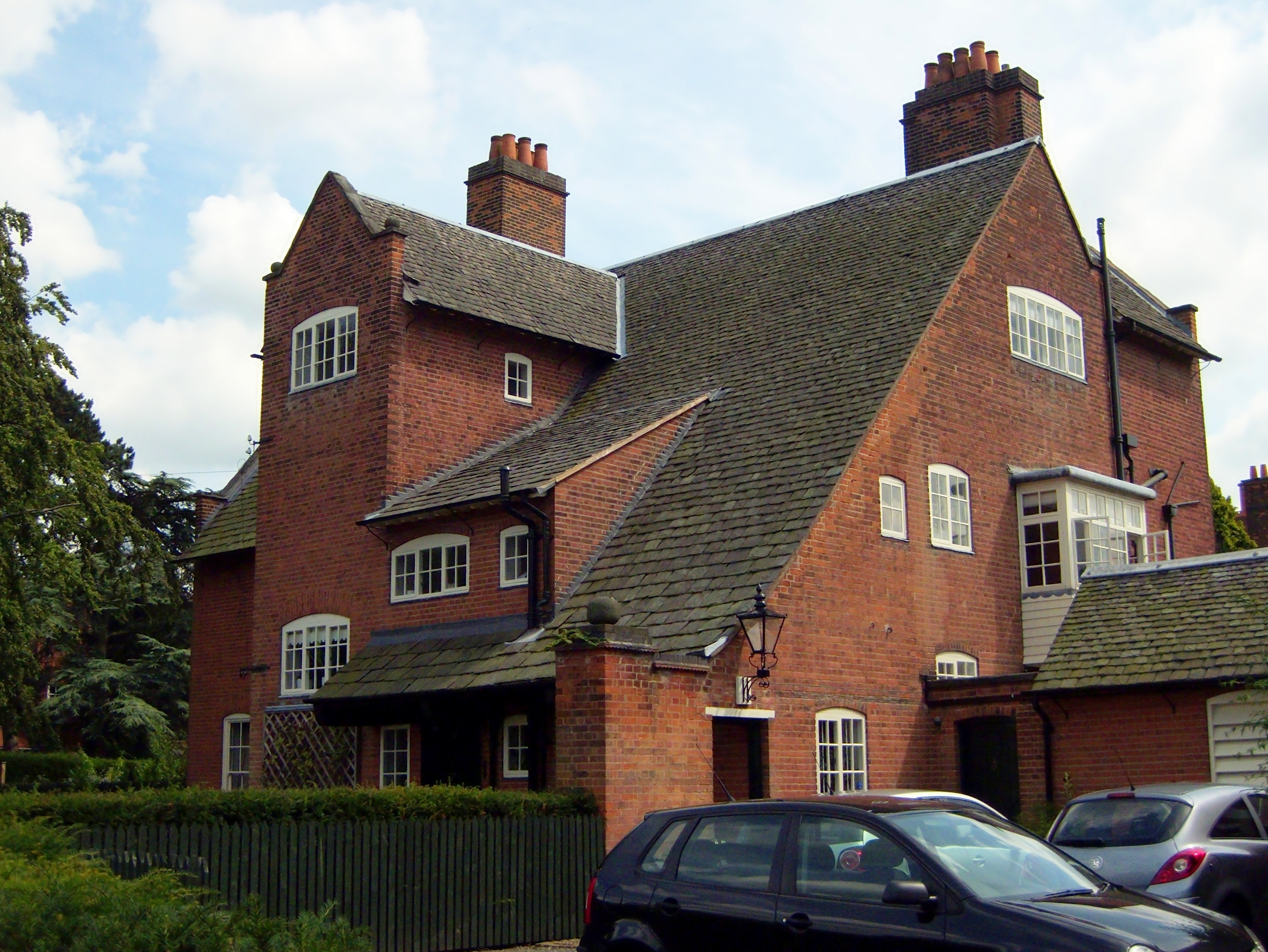
Inglewood (1892), Ratcliffe Road, designed by Ernest Gimson

Stoneygate is part of the City of Leicester, England.

Situated on the south-east side of the city some two miles from the centre, Stoneygate is a mainly residential suburb characterised by its large Victorian houses. It straddles the London Road which connects Leicester with the town of Market Harborough and was formerly the main route for horse-drawn carriages between Leicester and London. It gives its name to Stoneygate ward, which also includes parts of Evington Valley and Highfields, whilst the south-eastern parts of Stoneygate are counted in the Knighton ward of Leicester City Council.

== History ==
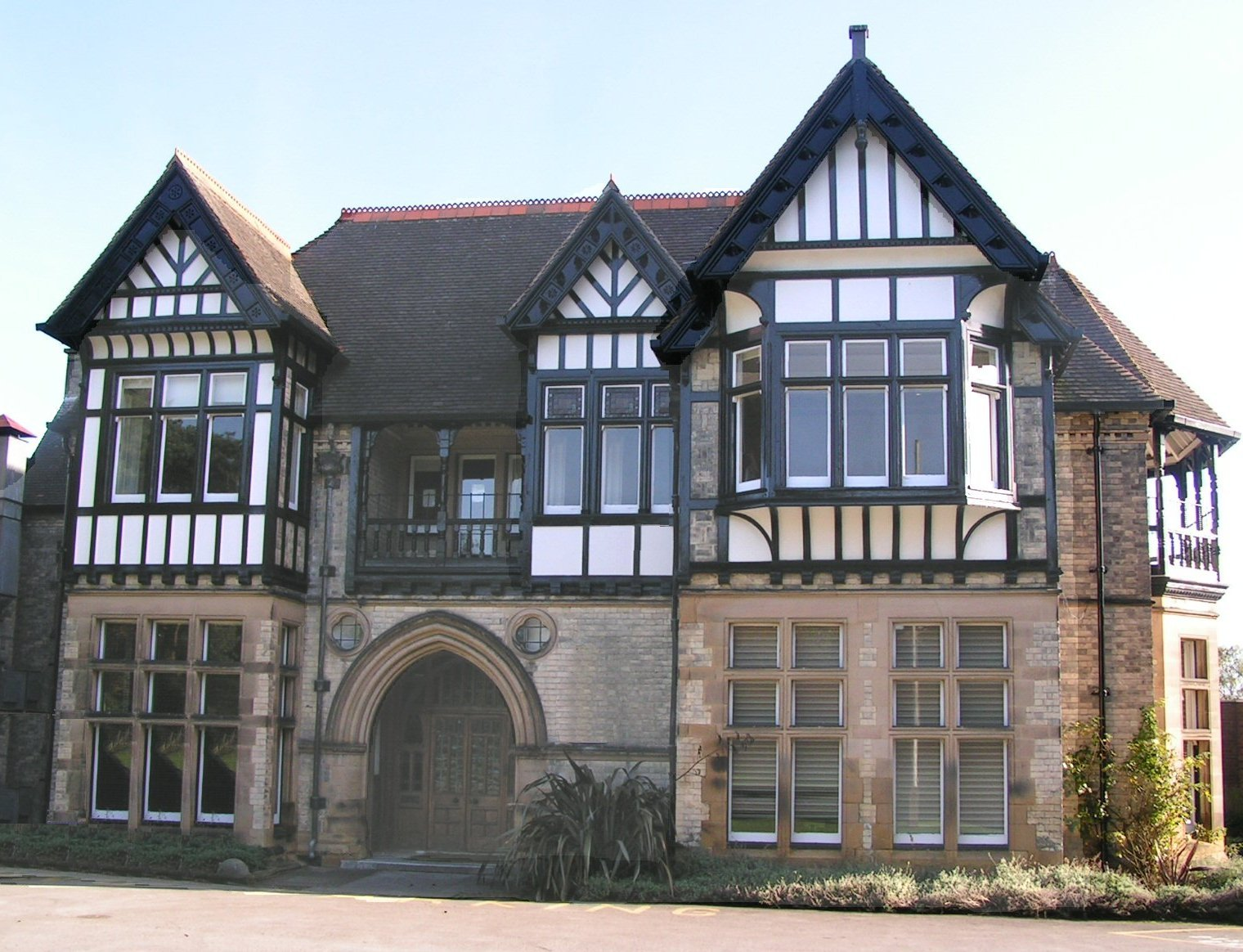
Brookfield on London Road, Thomas Fielding Johnson's family home

The name 'Stoneygate' originates in Old English as "stone road", and Ordnance Survey maps show the former route of the Roman Gartree Road leading south-east from Leicester towards Little Stretton, Medbourne, Corby and eventually, Colchester.

Stoneygate's historical significance was recognised when it was designated a conservation area by Leicester City Council in 1978. The Stoneygate Conservation Area (which also includes properties in the adjacent suburb of Clarendon Park) is bounded by Victoria Park Road to the north, Queens Road to the west, Stoneygate Road to the east and Shirley Road to the south. A map is available on the Stoneygate Conservation Area Society website (see external links below).

There are many examples of well-preserved Victorian family homes in Stoneygate as well as slightly later Edwardian buildings and -in the southern section- homes built after the Great War of 1914–18 and influenced by more modern architectural styles, notably Art Deco. Particularly worthy of note are 'Brookfield' and 'The Firs', both on London Road. The first is the best surviving example of a grand house and 'mini-estate' created by a prosperous manufacturing family in imitation of the local gentry. The second is Stoneygate's oldest house; an elegant Regency-style villa built for a solicitor c1826. There are no less than twelve Grade II listed residential properties. These include 'The White House' in North Avenue designed in a variation of the Arts & Crafts style by Ernest Gimson in 1898 and 22 Avenue Road, designed in the modernist style by Fello Atkinson and Brenda Walker of James Cubitt and Partners in 1953. The Stoneygate Conservation Area Society, a group of local volunteers with a current membership of 189 households, exists to inform the public about the Conservation Area, its history and proposed developments that will affect its future.

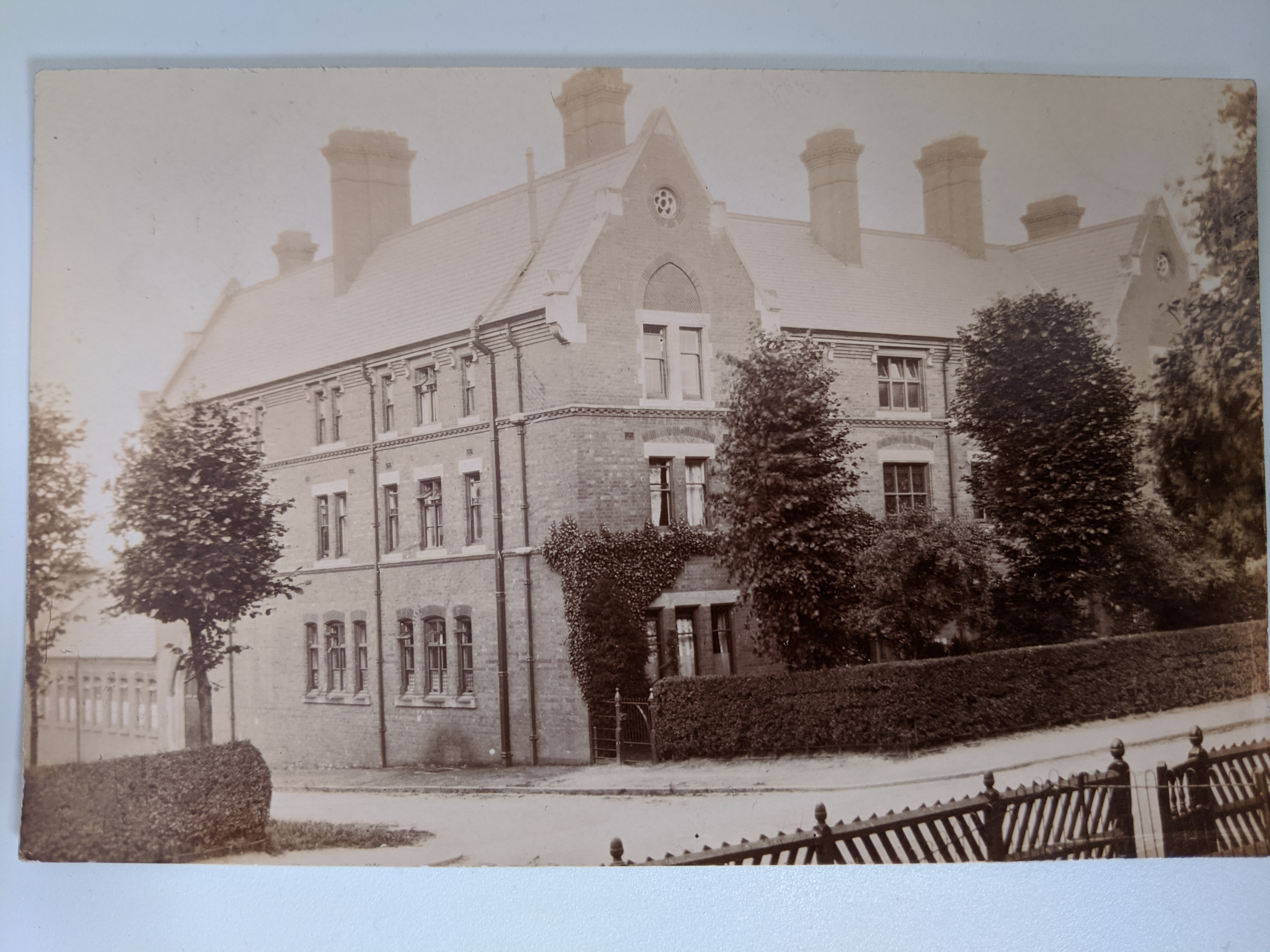
Circa 1908

== Profile of one Stoneygate house ==
No 58 Stoneygate Road stands on the corner of Aber Road, and is a large three-storey red brick Victorian building in the gothic style. It was built in 1880 to plans by local architect William Beaumont Smith to relocate the 'Home for Penitent Females' from its previous premises at 16 Blue Boar Lane, Leicester. 'The Home', as it was known, was a charity run by a Committee of local philanthropists and religious leaders to provide welfare and reform for unmarried mothers (often referred to as 'fallen women'). It is assumed that the women's children would have been taken from their mothers and would be treated as orphans or adopted soon after birth. The charity would generate income by taking in washing which would be done by the inmates.

The original plans are dated 23 July 1880 and appear to have been submitted for approval on 21 August that year and include a section of building up to No. 60 Stoneygate Road, which was never completed. The main three-storey component provided a kitchen, dining room and matron's office on the ground floor, with two floors of dormitories, individual bedrooms and bathrooms above. In an 'L'shaped single storey projection to the rear was the laundry and associated out buildings. A coal yard, carriage house and stable were added in 1882, also to designs by Beaumont-Smith.

William Beaumont-Smith (WBS) appears to have begun his career working for Parsons & Dain who were quite a successful firm of local architects in the early Victorian period, William Parsons being responsible for some of Leicester's grand civic buildings including the Leicestershire and Rutland County Asylum (later part of the University of Leicester) and the Theatre Royal (now demolished). They were also responsible for early parts of the Leicester Royal Infirmary. By 1855 Parsons seems to have disappeared from the partnership and WBS has taken his place; the firm now being called Dain & Smith. They are recorded in local directories as practising from 21 St. Martins in Leicester and during this time WBS was resident in London Rd (Stockdale Terrace and 51 London Rd – next to the Hind Hotel, opposite the railway station).

By 1876 WBS was on his own, practising from Greyfriars Chambers, 7 Friar Lane, Leicester, where he continued to work until his death in 1899. He was also Leicestershire County Surveyor from this time until his death. His private residences may indicate his changing fortunes: in 1876–77 he was resident at No. 2 New Walk. By 1878 he was at 'Trentham Villa' in Granville Road and remained here until 1881. This suggests he was doing very well indeed – they were (and some remain) grand houses overlooking Victoria Park at the southern end of New Walk. However, by 1889 he had moved to 61 Evington Rd – still nice houses but nothing like as grand and Granville Rd. He remained in Evington Rd until the late 1890s – in 1899 he was living at a property was called 'Campsie', 11 Alexandra Road in Stoneygate.

By the 1930s No. 58 Stoneygate Road had become 'The Home School' and some alterations were made including the addition of the single storey recreation room adjoining No.60 and the conversion of part of the outbuildings to a chapel. In 1942 a further single storey building was added to the rear of the recreation room as an air raid shelter. In the late 1950s the building changed hands again, this time passing to the NHS for use as a new community-based rehabilitation facility for women (later mixed) with learning disabilities. The facility, known as the Stoneygate Hostel, formed part of the Glenfrith group of hospitals along with Stretton Hall hospital. The Hostel was closed by the NHS in the mid-1990s. The building was occupied by the Leicester Montessori Grammar School until it abruptly closed in July 2016. As of 2026, it is the Miller House School.

== Stoneygate Conservation Area and Listed Buildings ==
Map showing conservation area and listed buildings in Stoneygate, Leicester:
1 St John The Baptist Church (1884-5) II*
2 Clarendon Park Congregational Church (1896) II
3 Eastfield, Stanley Road (1844) II
4 Stoneygate School (1857) II
5 The Firs: No. 223 London Road (1826-9) II
6 White House (1897) II
7 No 2 Springfield Road (1845) II
8 Nos 4 and 6 Springfield Road (1900) II
9 No 22 Avenue Road, plus Garden Room (1956) II
10 Inglewood, No. 32 Ratcliffe Road (1892) II*
11 Nos 34 to 38 Ratcliffe Road (1893) II
12 Ratcliffe Lodge (1897) II

The Stoneygate Conservation Area was established in 1978 to protect the character and appearance of the suburb. Described as 'Leicester’s best-surviving Victorian suburb', it covers 93 hectares (230 acres), much larger than Leicester's other conservation areas. The earliest houses, along the London Road, were built from 1840 onwards, in what was then the parish of Knighton, outside the borough boundary. Initially these were built by and for prosperous Leicester industrialists. From 1865, speculative builders began a larger scale expansion, including the opening up of side roads. The substantial houses that were built during the 19th and early 20th centuries included many examples by the city’s best-known architects including Joseph Goddard, Stockdale Harrison, Redfern & Sawday, James Tait and Isaac Barradale. In addition to the restrictions and safeguards afforded by the Conservation area as a whole, there are 13 buildings that are individually listed, which provides a higher degree of legal protection of the character and setting of the buildings concerned.

=== Stoneygate's Listed Buildings ===
Churches

- (1) Church of St. John the Baptist: CLARENDON PARK ROAD Grade II* listed building.No. 1074035. Built 1884-85, designed by Joseph Goddard.
- (2) Clarendon Park Congregational Church: LONDON ROAD Grade II listed building.No. 1361393. Congregational Church on London Road, built in 1896.

Stanley Road

- (3) Eastfield: STANLEY ROAD Grade II listed building.No. 1391182 Large suburban house of 1844 with three successive alterations up to 1904. It has been in institutional use since the mid-20th century and has a large 1950s extension.

London Road

- (4) Stoneygate School, No. 254 LONDON ROAD (No 1-4 Scholars Walk) Grade II listed building.No. 1300173. Built as a house in 1859.
- (5) The Firs: No. 223 LONDON ROAD Grade II listed building.No. 1300175 built around 1826-9.

North Avenue

- (6) The White House: No. 12 NORTH AVENUE Grade II listed building.No. 1185095. 1897 Arts and Crafts house in whitewashed brick, built by Ernest Gimson for his brother Arthur.

Springfield Road

- (7) No. 2 SPRINGFIELD ROAD: Grade II listed building.No. 1263323
- (8) Nos. 4 & 6 SPRINGFIELD ROAD: Grade II listed building.No. 1299684. A pair of semi-detached Norman Shaw style houses.

Avenue Road

- (9) AVENUE ROAD: No 22 Grade II listed building.No. 1375665. House of 1953-4 by James Cubitt and Partners for Mr and Mrs H Goddard. It was widely publicised when first built as an example of a new way of living, in a modernist style house.
- (9) AVENUE ROAD: No 22 Garden Room Grade II listed building.No. 1375666 Freestanding building in the garden of No 22, in the same 'sophisticated American' style.

Ratcliffe Road

- (10) Inglewood: No. 32 RATCLIFFE ROAD Grade II* listed building.No. 1074805. 1892 Arts and Crafts house with intact interiors. Built by Ernest Gimson for his own use, it was sold soon afterwards to Mr and Mrs Evans, who lived there until Mrs Annie Evans died in 1975, leaving their collection of Gimson Arts and Crafts furniture to the Leicestershire Museums service.
- (11) RATCLIFFE ROAD: 34–38 Grade II listed building.No. 1096041. Three attached houses built in 1893 by Amos Hall
- (12) Ratcliffe Lodge: No 56 RATCLIFFE ROAD Grade II listed building.No. 1109951. 1897 house by Joseph Goddard.

=== Demolished mansions ===
Statutory planning protection came too late for at least 30 of Stoneygate's 19th century mansions. These large buildings in extensive grounds proved too tempting a target for profit in the mid-20th century, when substantial blocks of flats or estates of houses could replace a single unwanted mansion. Several of the earliest houses in the suburb were lost in this way, including 'The Stoney Gate', a 17th-century farmhouse converted into a mansion in the 1820s, demolished in 1962. The Shrubbery (1845) was demolished to build the Stoneygate Court flats in 1934 and Elmsleigh Hall, built in 1874 for John Stafford, a Leicester cheese and provisions merchant, was demolished in 1935 to make way for Elmsleigh Avenue.

== Amenities ==
Stoneygate is well-provided with its own local amenities. In addition to the medical practice on Springfield Road and the St John the Baptist Primary School on East Avenue, there are several private schools (including Montessori), nurseries and dental practices. Stoneygate also has a wide variety of fashionable shops and boutiques on Allendale Road and Francis Street.

== Transport links ==
Leicester's London Road railway station is a fifteen-minute journey by bus, car or taxi.

Arriva Midlands operate Sapphire routes 31/31A/31E along the main London Road with buses up to every 10 minutes into Oadby and City Centre.

Centrebus operate the UHL Hospital Hopper services connecting with Leicester Royal Infirmary, Glenfield Hospital and the Leicester General Hospital, it serves a stop on Stoughton Road.

== Local and National Government ==
Stoneygate gives its name to a Leicester City Council ward that also includes parts of Evington Valley and Highfields. The population of the ward at the 2011 census was 20,390. It is part of the Leicester South parliamentary constituency whose MP is currently Shockat Adam (Independent).
