= William Spurrett Fielding-Johnson =

British military officer

William Spurrett Fielding Johnson
- Born: 8 February 1892; Leicester, Leicestershire, England
- Died: 10 February 1953 (aged 61); Leicester, Leicestershire, England
- Relatives: Thomas Fielding Johnson (grandfather)
- Military career
- Allegiance: United Kingdom
- Branch: British Army; Royal Air Force
- Service years: 1913–1918; 1939–1945
- Rank: Captain (WWI); Squadron Leader (WWII)
- Service number: 73613 (RAF)
- Units: Leicestershire Yeomanry; No. 3 Squadron RFC; No. 56 Squadron RFC; No. 214 Squadron RAF; No. 180 Squadron RAF
- Conflicts: World War I World War II
- Awards: Military Cross & Bar (1915 & 1918); Distinguished Flying Cross (1942)

William Spurrett Fielding Johnson MC and Bar, DFC (8 February 1892 – 10 February 1953) was a British military officer who served in both World War I and World War II. Originally an Army officer, he later joined the Royal Flying Corps, and became a flying ace credited with six aerial victories, and ended the war as a captain with two awards of the Military Cross. In World War II he served in the Royal Air Force, winning the Distinguished Flying Cross and rising to the rank of squadron leader.

== Biography ==
=== Background and early life ===
Fielding Johnson was born in Leicester, the son of Thomas Fielding Johnson Jr. (1856–1931) and Florence Lyne Paget (1856–1933), and grandson of Thomas Fielding Johnson. The family were wealthy worsted spinners.

He was educated at Rugby School, and was a cadet in the school's Junior Division of the Officers' Training Corps. He was commissioned as a Second Lieutenant in the Leicestershire ("Prince Albert's Own") Yeomanry on 16 March 1913.

=== World War I ===
The Leicestershire Yeomanry were mobilised in August 1914 at the start of the First World War, and arrived in France in November as part of the North Midland Mounted Brigade.

On 13 May 1915, during the Second Battle of Ypres, the regiment was on the front line of the Ypres Salient, occupying a sector of trenches about 300 yards (270 m) wide, north of the railway line running north-east from Ypres. Fielding Johnson was with "B" Squadron occupying the northern half of the line, with "C" Squadron to the south, and "A" Squadron in support trenches 300 yards further back. The advanced trenches were in poor condition, only 5 feet (1.5 m) deep and 2.5 feet (0.76 m) wide at the bottom. The parapets were of loose soil, there were few sandbags, and no dugouts or other forms of protection. Heavy shelling from 3.30 to 6.00 am caused few casualties, before the Germans attempted to launch an assault, but were repulsed. A second, heavier shelling began, until at 7.30 am the Germans attacked again, managing to capture part of "B" Squadron's trench, and advancing to within 200 yards of the support trenches by using bulletproof steel shields as protection, before digging in. Fielding Johnson and what was left of "B" Squadron joined "C" Squadron, and quickly threw up a barricade across the trench line, fighting off the enemy on their flank, and those advancing from the front. Casualties were very heavy and eventually Fielding Johnson was the only officer left. He decided to retire down the trench, cross the railway line and join the 3rd Dragoon Guards on the other side. They had great difficulty in crossing the railway, which was under fire from German machine guns, but managed by building a parapet of sandbags. Fielding Johnson eventually joined the 3rd Dragoons accompanied by a sergeant-major and 14 men, the only survivors from "B" and "C" squadrons. "A" Squadron held their position in the support trenches until noon, when they were reinforced by troops from Royal Horse Guards, the 10th Hussars, and the Essex Yeomanry, and counter-attacked, but succeeded only in driving the Germans back as far as the advanced trenches, so the dead and wounded were never recovered. That day the regiment lost 52 killed, 95 wounded and 39 missing. On 3 July 1915 Fielding Johnson was awarded the Military Cross for his "conspicuous gallantry" on that day.

On 19 October 1915, he began aerial duty as an observer/gunner in 3 Squadron's Morane Parasols. On 19 January 1916, he was injured during a crash. After he recovered, he trained as a pilot. In October 1917, he was posted to 56 Squadron. In a month's action beginning 17 February 1918 and ending 18 March, while flying Royal Aircraft Factory SE.5a No. B37, he destroyed four enemy fighters, drove down another one out of control, and destroyed a reconnaissance two-seater. The latter victory was shared with fellow ace Second Lieutenant Maurice Mealing. He was awarded the bar to his Military Cross on 13 May 1918.

=== World War II ===
Fielding Johnson joined the Royal Air Force Volunteer Reserve prior to the outbreak of the Second World War, being granted a probationary commission as a pilot officer on 4 July 1939. His commission was confirmed and he was promoted to flying officer on 7 September 1939. Fielding Johnson served as an aerial gunner with 'A' Fight, 214 Squadron and was the oldest rear gunner in the service in 1940–41. He was promoted to flight lieutenant on 7 September 1940, and was serving as an acting-squadron leader when awarded the Distinguished Flying Cross on 22 September 1942. He was promoted to squadron leader on 1 July 1944. On 29 October 1944 he parachuted to safety behind allied lines after the Mitchell bomber he was flying in was shot down by anti-aircraft fire over Holland. At the time he was Gunnery Officer with 180 Squadron, based in Belgium with the Second Tactical Air Force at Melsbroek. He was uninjured.

== Family ==
Fielding Johnson married, firstly in 1918, Gwendolen (or Gwendoline) Edith Whetstone, daughter of the late Walter Whetstone (1863–1904) of Shirley Lodge, Knighton, Leicester and his wife Edith Caroline Beckingham; her mother, daughter of James Beckingham of Burnopfield, had remarried in 1908, to Ernest Varvill Hiley, and was known later as Lady Hiley.

The couple resided at Strancliffe, Barrow on Soar; and later at Marske-by-Sea and Sawley. There was an only son of the marriage, Hugh Henry (1921–1945). He was killed over Germany, taking part in Operation Clarion on 22 February 1945. The marriage ended in divorce in 1929, with Gwendolen bringing an action for divorce because of adultery, which was not defended. Gwendolen died in a road accident in 1935.

Fielding Johnson married, secondly in 1931 at the Savoy Chapel, Noel Earle née Downes-Martin, of Killoskehane Castle, County Tipperary. She had married, firstly in 1918, Eric Greville Earle, the marriage being dissolved in 1931, and Earle marrying that year Diana Harley. Noel had four sons with Earle, the eldest Cecil Diccon being accidentally killed while serving in the Royal Horse Artillery on 15 November 1945.

In 1930 Fielding Johnson moved to Compton Bassett in Wiltshire. He bought Manor Farm there that year, later adding Streete Farm and in 1936 Dugdale's Farm, and built up a dairy herd.
