= Thomas Fielding Johnson =

British businessman and philanthropist

- Thomas Fielding Johnson, c.1900
- Born: Thomas Johnson; 24 December 1828; Nether Langwith, Nottinghamshire, England
- Died: 18 March 1921 (aged 92); Leicester, England
- Education: Nonconformist Proprietary School, Leicester
- Occupations: Businessman and philanthropist
- Years active: 1852–1921
- Spouse(s): Julia Christiana Stone (m. 1855–1859) Agnes Paget (m. 1863–1917)
- Children: Thomas Jr. (1856–1931); Joseph (1857); Agnes Mabel (1864–1942); Harold Paget (1865–1877)
- Parent(s): John Goode Johnson (1798–1872); Eliza Fielding (1803–1878)
- Relatives: William Spurrett Fielding-Johnson (grandson)

Thomas Fielding Johnson (24 December 1828 – 18 March 1921) was a prominent Victorian businessman and philanthropist in Leicester, England. Among his many acts of public spiritedness and generosity was the donation in 1919 of a 37 acres (15 ha) site and buildings for the establishment of Leicester, Leicestershire and Rutland University College which finally became the University of Leicester.

== Family life ==
Fielding Johnson was born at Nether Langwith, Nottinghamshire, the third of eight children born to John Goode Johnson (1798–1872) and Eliza Fielding (1803–1878). His very early years were spent at the family home, The Old Mill House in Langwith, but he soon followed his elder brother to study at the Nonconformist Proprietary School in Leicester (the building now occupied by the New Walk Museum & Art Gallery) and moved into the Leicester home of his uncle (his mother's brother) and aunt, Joseph and Martha Fielding.

His aunt and uncle had no children of their own and Fielding Johnson was adopted by them in 1840 aged twelve. This sort of arrangement was not uncommon among the Victorian middle-classes and allowed the wealth earned by successful parents to be passed down the generations and retained within families. Previously known simply as Thomas Johnson, from then on he adopted the surname that he is now known by; Fielding Johnson.

In 1855 Fielding Johnson married Julia Christiana Stone, the daughter of Samuel Stone and Mary Chamberlain. As the first Town Clerk to the New Corporation of Leicester (an office equivalent to Chief Executive in the modern City Council and which he held between 1836 and 1872), Fielding Johnson's father-in-law was a prominent member of Leicester's growing professional middle-class. He was a partner in the legal firm of Stone, Paget and Billson and left a legacy to future generations of lawyers in the form of his 'Stone's Justices' Manual', a definitive legal text which is still available today. The marriage ended after only four years as a result of Christiana's premature death in 1859. It produced two sons; Thomas Fielding Johnson Junior (1856–1931) and Joseph (1857) who died aged only six months.

Fielding Johnson remarried in 1863. His second wife came from his existing social circle and was Agnes Paget, second daughter of Alfred Paget and Eliza Smith. Alfred Paget was also a partner in the firm of Stone, Paget and Billson and belonged to a local family with a landowning background whose younger members were prominent in Leicester's professions. This second marriage - which appears to have been a very happy one- lasted until Agnes died in 1917. It produced a daughter Agnes Mabel (1864–1942) and a son, Harold Paget (1865–1877) who contracted measles while a boarder at Rugby School and died, aged only twelve.

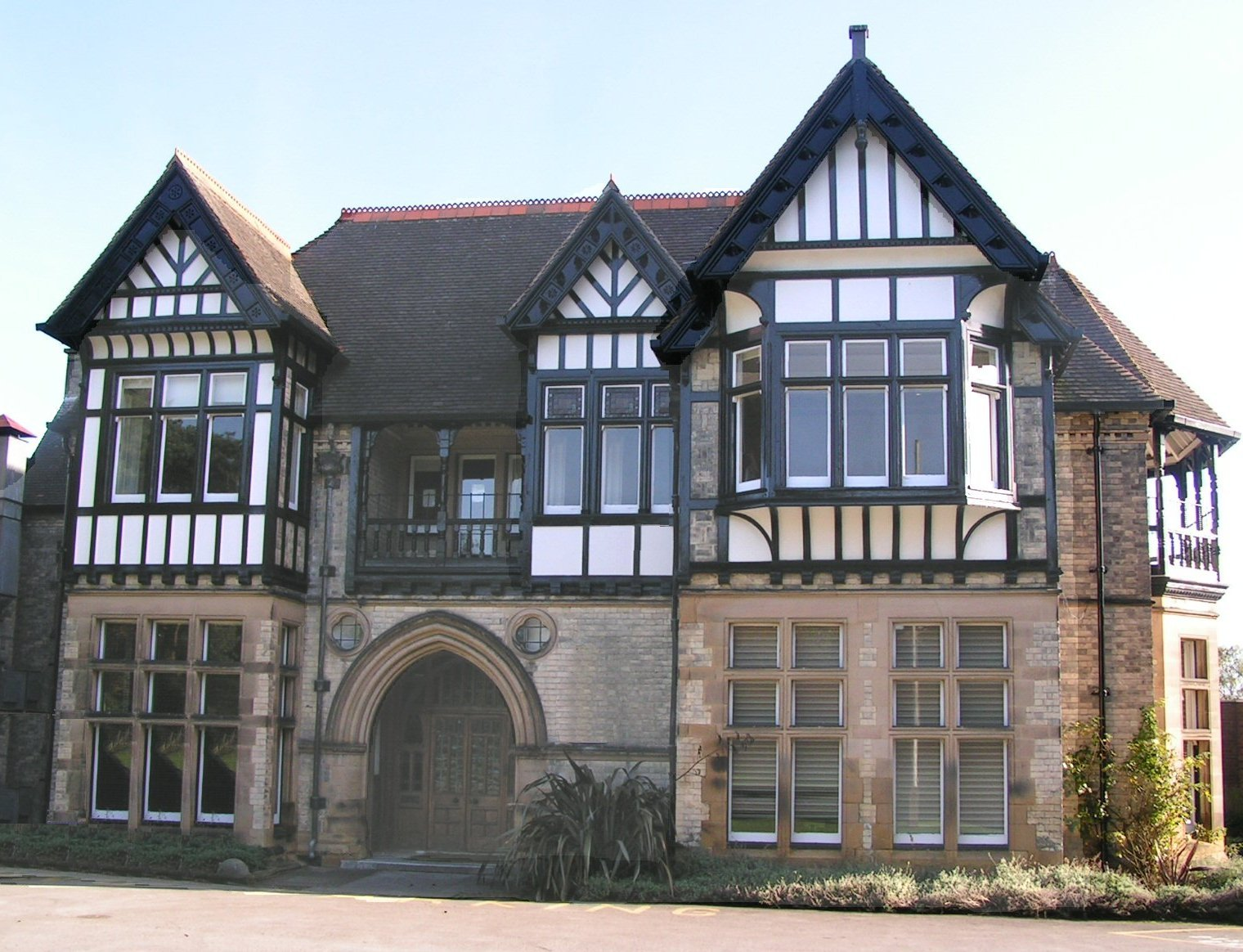
"Brookfield", Thomas Fielding Johnson's family home in Stoneygate, Leicester

From 1869 until his death, the family lived at "Brookfield", a large Victorian house standing in its own miniature 'estate' and modelled on the seats of the local gentry. Situated in open countryside along the London Road and just beyond the borough boundary, it was one of the first houses to be built in what later became the residential suburb of Stoneygate. The house and grounds were given to the new Diocese of Leicester by Thomas Fielding Johnson Junior in the 1920s and became the home of Bishop Bardsley, Leicester's first bishop since the ninth century. Brookfield was used by the Red Cross during the second world war, later as the Charles Frears Nursing and Midwifery campus of De Montfort University and since May 2013 has been part of the University of Leicester.

Johnson died on 18 March 1921.

== Business ==
Fielding Johnson's adoptive father Joseph was a freeman of the borough, a member of the new corporation (from 1835), an alderman and (between 1846 and 1847) Borough Mayor. He was a well-known figure in early Victorian Leicester who was, by the time his nephew arrived, the owner of a successfully established worsted spinning business in West Bond Street. He made Thomas a partner in 1852 and on his uncle's death in the same year, Thomas assumed control aged 24 years.

Fielding Johnson appears to have been a talented but careful businessman who recognised that his best hopes for sustainable success lay in developing an effective business model in one factory and then duplicating it in others. It appears to have worked (during his own lifetime, at least). Throughout the 1914–18 war the Fielding & Johnson Company supplied more yarn to the Government for army purposes than any other firm in England.

=== Innovation ===
The Fielding & Johnson Company was one of the first in Leicester to use steam engines in its factories. The factory in Bond Street spun wool sourced in England and later New Zealand and in 1861 two steam engines named 'Juno' and 'Jupiter' were installed to operate new 'Brookhouse' knitting frames. These two engines were not replaced until the 1940s. In 1862 the firm bought a second factory in Leicester, Abbey Mills, and in 1885 a third, Anker Mill in Nuneaton. The two engines in this latter (named 'Annie' and 'Elizabeth') were modelled on James Watt's original steam engine and ran night and day between 1890 and 1938 with only three stoppages of more than a week.

The company continued to innovate long after Thomas's death. In 1957 Anker Mill was the first premises in England into which the "New Bradford" system of worsted weaving, drawing and spinning was introduced. This revolutionary new system combined the old labour-intensive system of drawing, spinning, twisting and winding using large numbers of machines into a single system where only three operations were needed. This allowed more wool to be produced on the same floor area and was thus much more efficient.

== Voluntary and social work ==
While he appears to have had little interest in national politics, Fielding Johnson was very active in local politics and social affairs. He was a town councillor between 1861 and 1870 and was also made a Justice of the Peace for the Borough in 1873 and for the County in 1888. Remarkably for a man in his position, he also found time to be a prison visitor.

Like many of the City's emerging middle-class, Fielding Johnson was a religious nonconformist and like John Biggs he attended the Great Meeting Hall in Bond Street (where his marriage to Christiana took place).

Humane in his outlook and a Liberal by conviction, he was nonetheless a firm believer in maintaining law and order and volunteered as a Special Constable during the Chartist riots that followed the 1848 French Revolution.

Fielding Johnson was also ready to take up arms when necessary and was one of the first twelve members of the Leicester Volunteer Rifle Corps. Formed in 1859 and later absorbed into the Territorial Army, they were a reaction to the perceived threat of an invasion from France led by belligerent army officers during the unstable reign of Emperor Napoleon III.

He was a trustee of the Sutton Charity, established by Leicester businessman Benjamin Sutton in 1858 to provide support for patients requiring convalescence after hospital treatment and thus unable to work. He was also a member of the Board of Governors of Leicester Infirmary (later the Leicester Royal Infirmary) for thirty years, spending most of it as vice-chairman and the years between 1898 and 1902 as chairman.

On 10 June 1919 Thomas Fielding Johnson was introduced to King George V and Queen Mary during their visit to Leicester as 'the Grand Old Man'. In recognition of his great contribution to the city and its people, he was presented with the honorary Freedom of the City on 30 September 1919 aged 91 years old. A silver casket containing the document is in the possession of Leicester Museum. A memorial tablet commemorating his gift to Leicester University can be seen in the building that bears his name while a bell at Leicester Cathedral was named in honour of his son, Thomas Fielding Johnson Junior.
