= Queens Road, Leicester =

Shopping area in Leicester, UK

Coordinates: 52.617°N 1.117°W

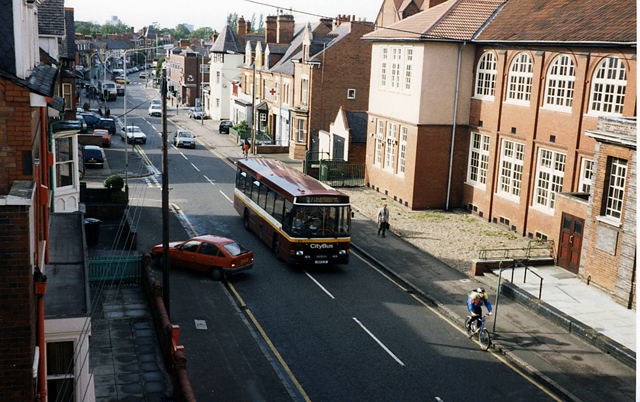
Queens Road

Queens Road is the main shopping area for the Clarendon Park area in Leicester. Notably the road contains Leicester Friends Meeting House as well as several other Christian places of worship.

Although house prices along this street are generally high, there are some very reasonably-priced terrace houses in the midsection.

Schools nearby include St Crispin’s Grammar and Preparatory School, St John’s the Baptist C of E Primary School, Avenue Primary School and Leicester Partnership School.
