= Clarendon Park, Leicester =

Area of the city of Leicester, England

Coordinates: 52.616°N 1.116°W

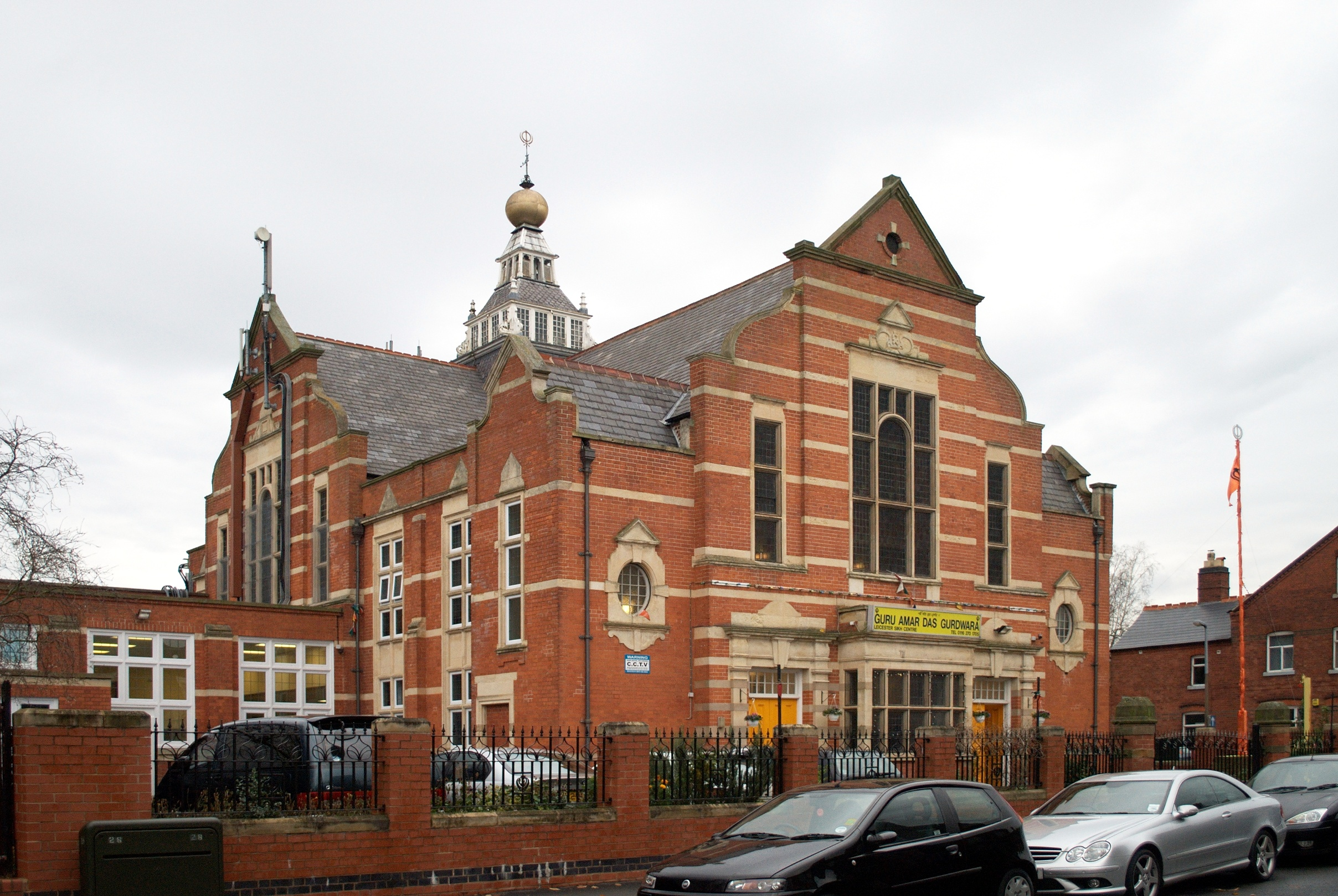
The Guru Amar Das Gurdwara on Clarendon Park Road: one of the most prominent buildings in the area

Clarendon Park is an area in the south of the city of Leicester. It is bordered by Welford Road to the west, London Road to the east, Victoria Park to the north and Avenue Road/Avenue Road Extension to the south. It is part of Castle Ward and the constituency of Leicester South. There are two major shopping streets; Queens Road and Clarendon Park Road. These two roads intersect near the centre of Clarendon Park, with Queens Road running north–south, and Clarendon Park Road running east–west.

== History ==
It is often said that, until the nineteenth century, much of the land now covered by Clarendon Park was owned by the Society of Friends, whose meeting house is still situated in the area. It is believed that it was the Society's opposition to the consumption of alcohol that led to there at one time being very few pubs in the area, although several bars have opened in recent years along Queens Road. In fact, the land was owned by the Cradock family of Knighton. It remained undeveloped until the 1870s until Edward Hartopp Cradock sold it (120 acres) to Samuel Francis Stone, Charles Smith and Alfred Donisthorpe, three local businessmen operating under the name the `Clarendon Park Company', and it is much more likely that they, as nonconformists, made it a binding condition of any future land sale that developed properties should not be used to sell alcoholic beverages.

The origin of the name 'Clarendon Park' is unknown, but it has been suggested that it was chosen because it "bestowed an appropriate dignity on what was intended to be a good class residential district".

Building work began immediately and the streets west of Queens Road were laid out and developed very quickly by local builders such as Harry Orton or architect/builders such as James Bird. East of Queens Road, development was slower and more sporadic, with some larger plots in Clarendon Park Road, North, East and Central Avenues being bought as investments. The better-known architects active in Clarendon Park during the 1880s included James Tait, Isaac Barradale (6-12 Clarendon Park Road) and Stockdale Harrison (East Avenue). In the 1890s Springfield Road provided a showcase for Goddard & Co (nos 6-8 and 45–55), Draper & Walters (no27), Arthur Wakerley (no3) and Redfern & Sawday while Ernest Gimson built a house for his half-brother, Arthur, in North Avenue in 1897.

== Clarendon Park today ==
An important influence on Clarendon Park is its proximity to the University of Leicester. A large number of university students live in the area, something that has led to it being described as "a redbrick uni nirvana".

Leicester Squash Club and Leicestershire Lawn Tennis Club are both a short walk away in nearby Stoneygate and Knighton.

Clarendon Park is known as a centre for small independent businesses, with cafés and vintage and second-hand shops particularly well represented.

== Notable people ==
Joe Orton lived at 261 Avenue Road Extension between 1933 and 1936.

== Schools ==
St. John The Baptist Church of England Infant and Junior School is situated on East Avenue and Clarendon Park Road, was officially opened in 1974.

Avenue Primary School is located on Avenue Road Extension.

St Crispin’s School is a Grammar and Preparatory School of Victoria Park on St Mary’s Road. It is an independent school.

== Places of Worship ==
- Christchurch Clarendon Park, A Baptist-Methodist Ecumenical Church
- Clarendon Park Congregational Church, opened in 1886.
- Guru Amar Das Gurdwara (Leicester Sikh Centre), opened in 1992 by the ex-committee members of Guru Teg Bahadar and Guru Nanak Gurdwara in an old Protestant Church
- Chinese Christian Church
- Geeta Bhavan Hindu Temple
- St John the Baptist (Church of England)
- Avenue Community Church
- Messianic Jewish Synagogue
- Leicester Society of Friends (Quakers)
- RCCG Amazing Grace Leicester
- LPJC (Neve Shalom), Progressive Synagogue
