= Leicester =

- City and unitary authority
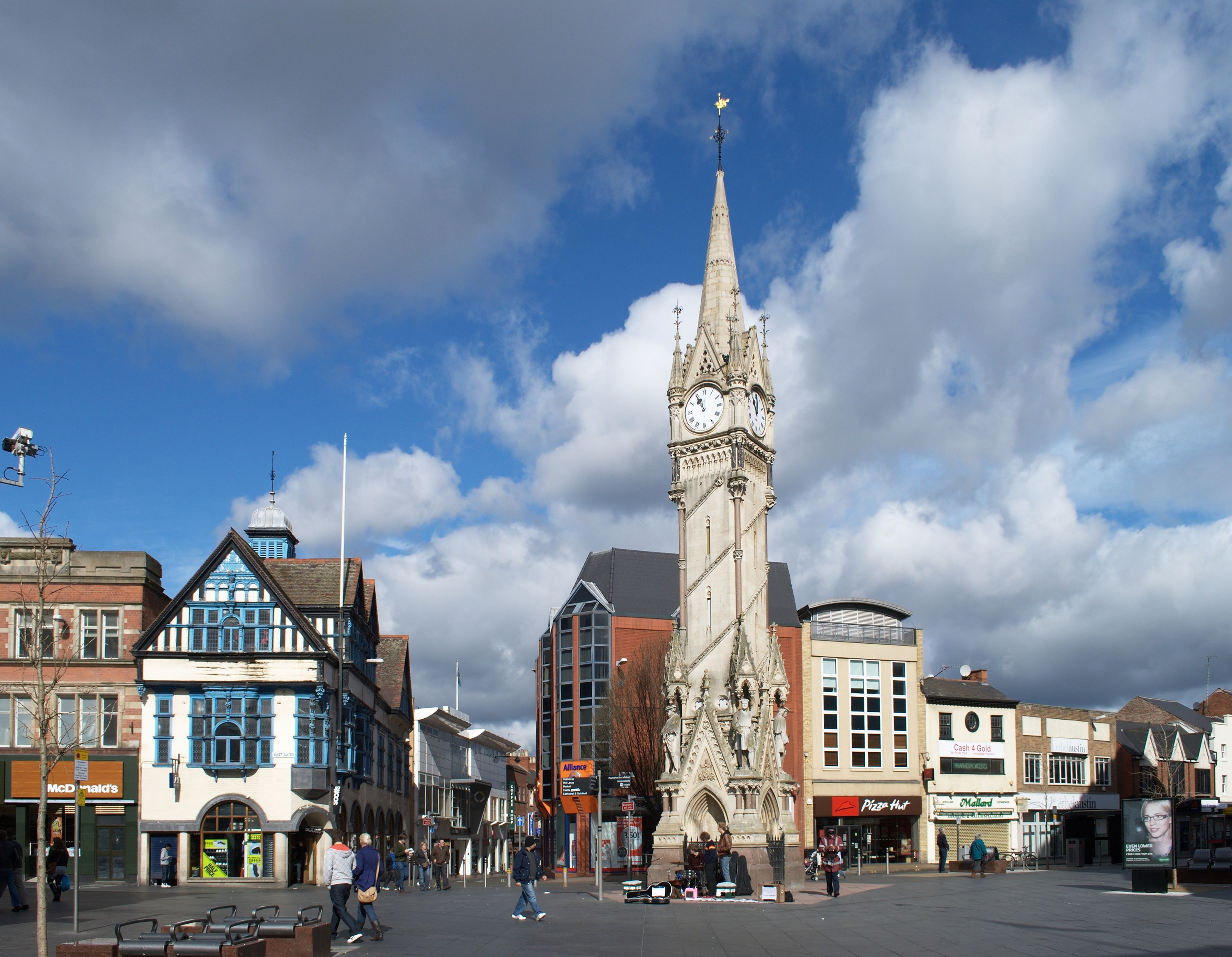
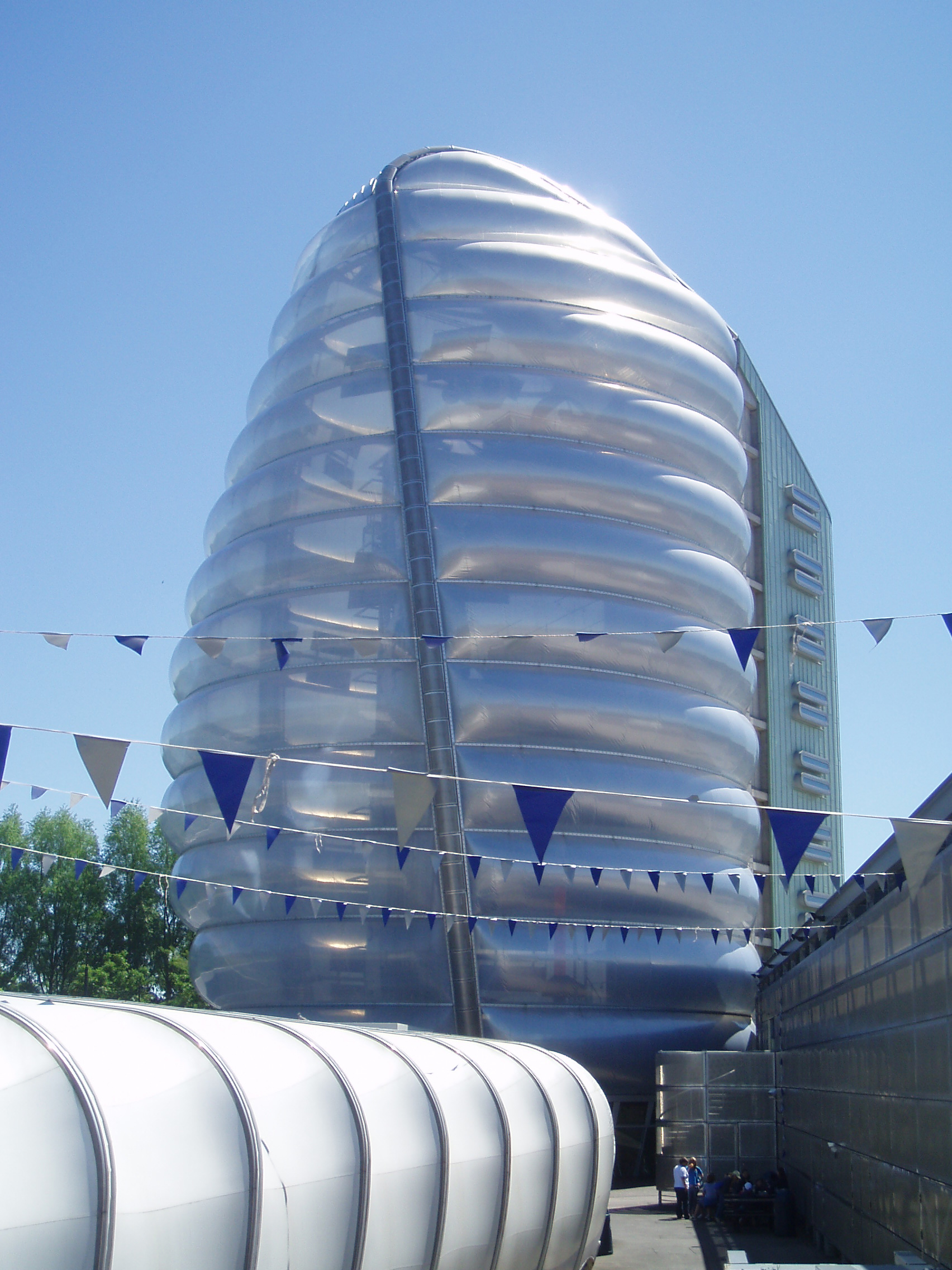
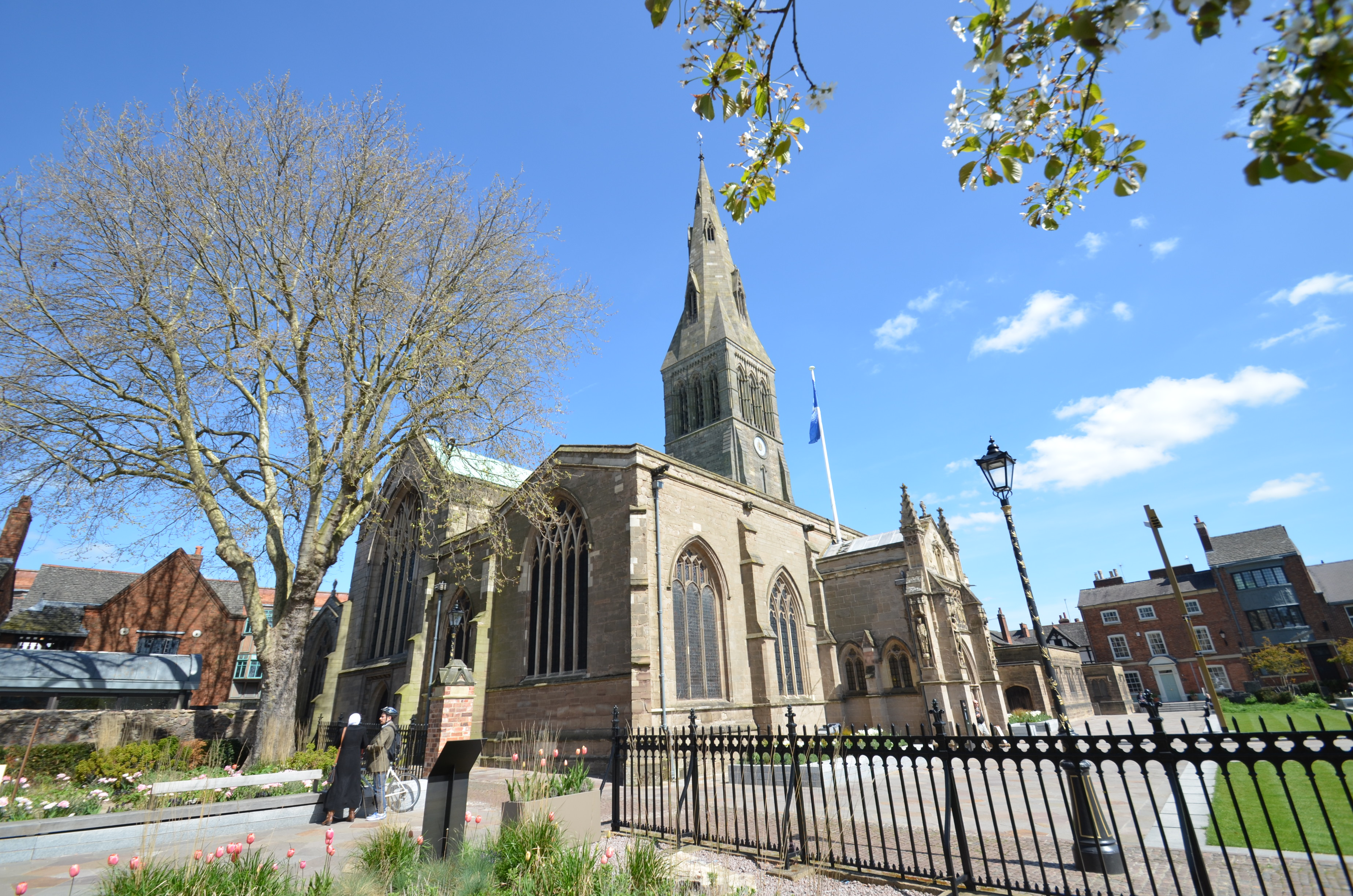
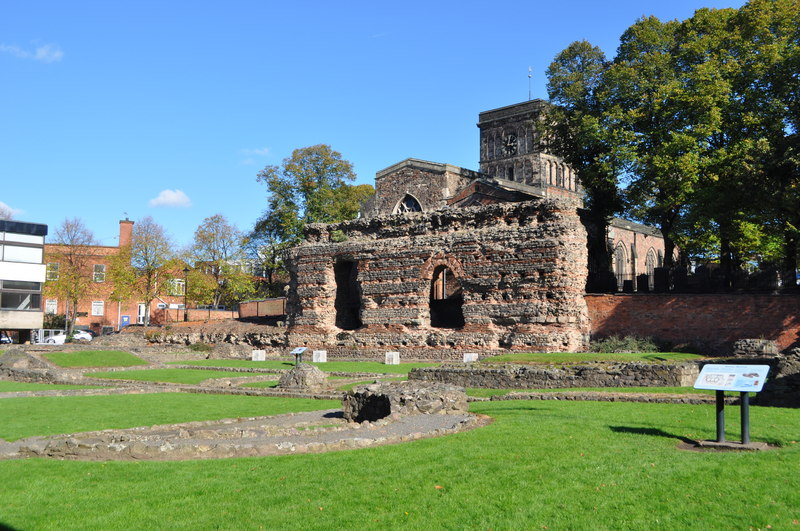
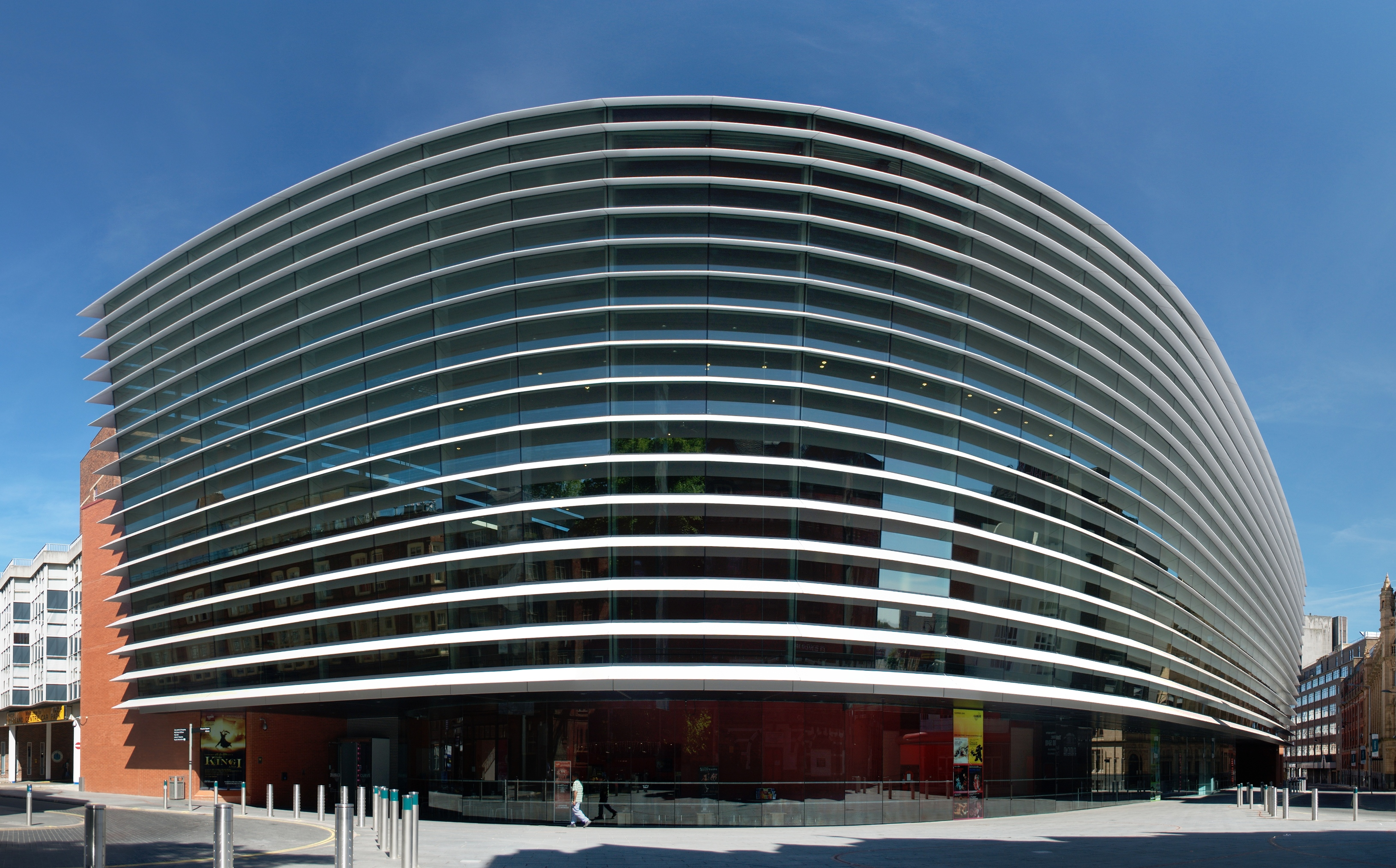
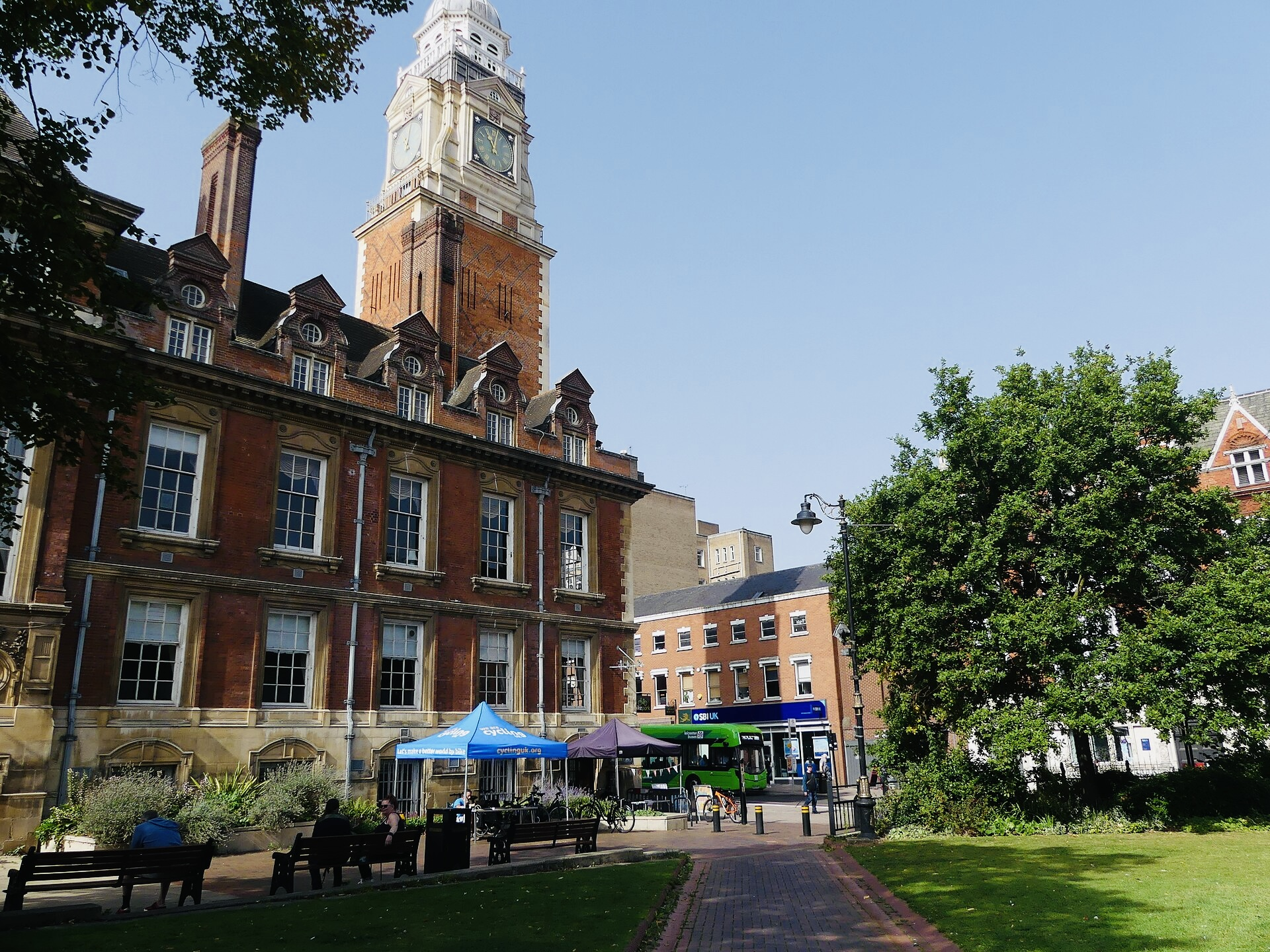
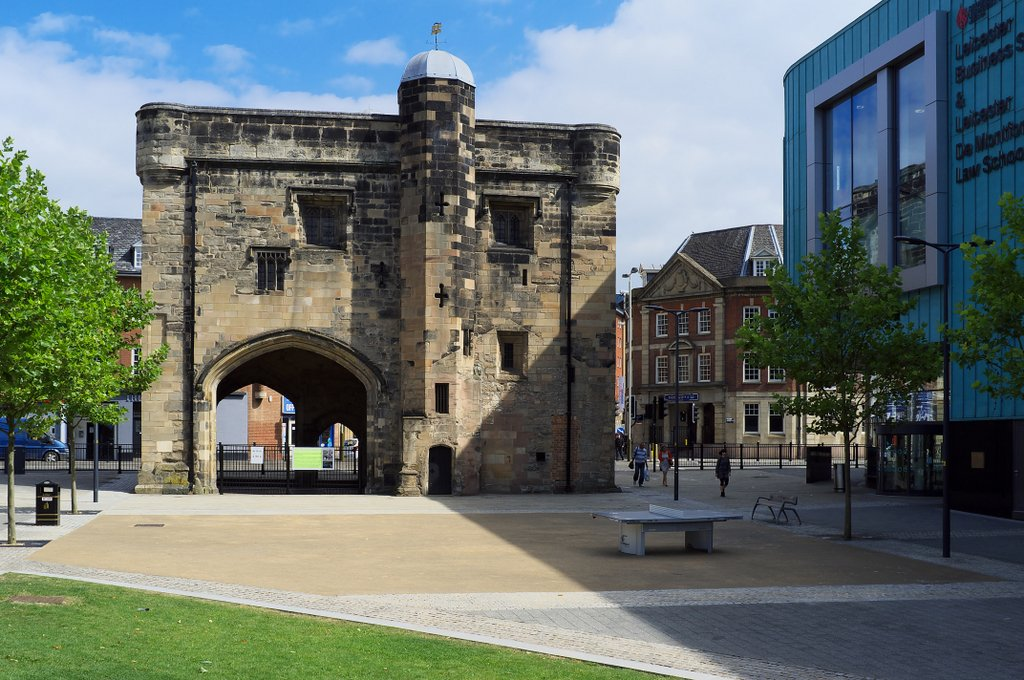
- Clock Tower Space Centre Cathedral Jewry Wall Curve Theatre Town Hall Magazine Gateway

- Coat of arms
- Motto(s): Latin: Semper Eadem, lit. 'Always the Same'
- Shown within Leicestershire
- Coordinates: 52°38′10″N 1°07′59″W
- OS grid reference: SK 5874 0433
- Sovereign state: United Kingdom
- Country: England
- Region: East Midlands
- Ceremonial county: Leicestershire
- Founded: c.47 AD as Ratae Corieltauvorum
- City status restored: 1919
- Unitary authority: 1997
- Administrative HQ: City Hall
- Civic suite: Leicester Town Hall
- Areas of the city (2011 census BUASD): List: Abbey; Aylestone; Aylestone Park; Beaumont Leys; Birstall (Village) (part); Braunstone Town (Village) (part); City Centre; Clarendon Park; Dane Hills; Evington; Frog Island; Glenfield (Village) (part); Glen Parva (Village) (part); Hamilton; Humberstone; Kirby Muxloe (Village) (part); Knighton (Village) (part); New Humberstone; New Parks; North Evington; Oadby (Town) (part); Rowlatts Hill; Rowley Fields; South Wigston (Village) (part); Stoneygate; Thurncourt; Westcotes; Wigston (Town) (part); Wolsey Island

Government
  - Type: Unitary authority with mayor and cabinet
  - Body: Leicester City Council
  - Control: Labour
  - Elected mayor: Peter Soulsby (L)
  - Lord Mayor: Kulwinder Singh Johal
  - Chief Executive: Alison Greenhill
  - House of Commons: 3 MPs: Shockat Adam (Ind); Liz Kendall (L); Shivani Raja (C)

Area
  - Total: 73 km^{2} (28 sq mi)
  - Rank: 225th

Population (2025)
  - Total: 383,116
  - Rank: 22nd
  - Density: 5,224/km^{2} (13,530/sq mi)
- Demonym: Leicestrian

Ethnicity (2021)
  - Ethnic groups: List: 43.4% Asian; 40.9% White; 7.8% Black; 3.8% Mixed; 4.1% other

Religion (2021)
  - Religion: List: 24.7% Christianity; 23.5% Islam; 23.0% no religion; 17.9% Hinduism; 4.5% Sikhism; 0.3% Buddhism; 0.1% Judaism; 0.6% other; 5.6% not stated
- Time zone: UTC+0 (GMT)
  - Summer (DST): UTC+1 (BST)
- Postcode area: LE
- Dialling code: 0116
- ISO 3166 code: GB-LCE
- GSS code: E06000016
- ITL code: TLF21
- GVA: 2021 estimate
  - Total: £9.2 billion
  - Per capita: £25,124
- GDP (nominal): 2021 estimate
  - Total: £10.2 billion
  - Per capita: £27,848
- Website: leicester.gov.uk

Leicester (/ˈlɛstər/ LES-tər) is a city, unitary authority area, and the county town of Leicestershire, in the East Midlands of England. It is the largest city in the East Midlands, with a population of 383,116 in 2025. The greater Leicester urban area had a population of 559,017 in 2021, making it the 11th most populous in England, and the 13th most populous in the United Kingdom. For three years running, the annual Good Growth for Cities Index has ranked Leicester as the best place to live and work in the East Midlands. The latest study, which is based on a range of economic factors, rated Leicester as the best performing city in the East Midlands in 2024 and 20th overall out of 52 other UK cities.

The city lies on the River Soar and is approximately 90 miles (140 km) north-northwest of London, 33 miles (53 km) east-northeast of Birmingham and 21 miles (34 km) northeast of Coventry. Nottingham and Derby lie around 21 miles (34 km) to the north and northwest respectively, whilst Peterborough is located 37 miles (60 km) to the east. Leicester is close to the eastern end of the National Forest.

Leicester has a long history extending into ancient times. The site of an Iron Age oppidum, it developed into the Roman town of Ratae Corieltauvorum following the conquest. The ruins of Ratae were later settled by the Anglo-Saxons, and then captured by the Vikings who made it one of the Five Boroughs of the Danelaw. After the Norman Conquest the town came under the authority of the Beaumont and De Montfort Earls, most notably the famous rebel Simon de Montfort. After his death in 1265 the town passed to the House of Lancaster and Leicester Castle became one of their strongholds, a royal residence when the family came to the throne in 1399. Leicester therefore became an important town in the wider nation, the meeting place of the parliaments of 1318, 1414, and 1450, and a place frequently visited by the King and his court. Most famously King Richard III spent his last days in the town before his death at the Battle of Bosworth and was buried there in August 1485. In the Early Modern era Puritanism flourished in Leicester and the town was a supporter of the Parliamentarian cause in the Civil War. In the Victorian age the town became known for its hosiery and shoe manufacturing industries. It also rapidly expanded in population and size eventually gaining city status in 1919. Since the mid-20th century, immigration from countries of the British Commonwealth has seen Leicester become an ethnically diverse city, and one of the largest urban centres of the Midlands.

Leicester is at the intersection of two railway lines: the Midland Main Line and the Birmingham to London Stansted Airport line. It is also at the confluence of the M1/M69 motorways and the A6/A46 trunk routes. Leicester Cathedral is home to the new tomb of Richard III who was reburied in the cathedral in 2015 after being discovered nearby in the foundations of the lost Greyfriars chapel, more than 500 years after his death. In sporting terms, the city of Leicester is home to football club Leicester City, rugby club Leicester Tigers, basketball team Leicester Riders, the Leicester City Hockey Club, and the Leicestershire County Cricket Club. In 1996, a statue was erected in the city centre to commemorate the success of the city's sporting teams in this year. In 2016, Leicester was named as the UK's Greatest Sporting City, and in 2008, it was named as a European City of Sport.

== Name ==
The name of Leicester comes from Old English. It is first recorded in Latinised form in the early ninth century as Legorensis civitatis and in Old English itself in an Anglo-Saxon Chronicle entry for 924 as Ligera ceastre (and, in various spellings, frequently thereafter). In the Domesday Book of 1086, it is recorded as Ledecestre.

The first element of the name is the name of a people, the Ligore (whose name appears in Ligera ceastre in the genitive plural form); their name came in turn from the river Ligor (now the River Soar), the origin of whose name is uncertain but thought to be from Brittonic (possibly cognate with the name of the Loire).

The second element of the name is the Old English word ceaster ("(Roman) fort, fortification, town", itself borrowed from Latin castrum).

A list of British cities in the ninth-century History of the Britons includes one Cair Lerion; Leicester has been proposed as the place to which this refers (and the Welsh name for Leicester is Caerlŷr). But this identification is not certain.

Based on the Welsh name (given as Kaerleir), Geoffrey of Monmouth proposed a king Leir of Britain as an eponymous founder in his Historia Regum Britanniae (12th century). (Note: "After this unhappy fate of Bladud, Leir, his son was advanced to the throne, and nobly governed his country sixty years. He built, upon the river Sore a city, called in the British tongue Kaerleir, in the Saxon, Leircestre.")

== History ==
Map of key historic sites of Leicester Old Town. The Roman and medieval walls are marked by the dotted line. The one surviving Roman ruin is marked in purple. The secular sites are in blue. The towns five surviving ancient churches are in red. The dissolved mendicant and chantry foundations are in black. The key site of Leicester Abbey over the river is beyond the borders of the map to the north east.

=== Prehistory ===
Leicester is one of the oldest cities in England, with a history going back at least two millennia. The native Iron Age settlement encountered by the Romans at the site seems to have developed in the 2nd or 1st centuries BC, around a century or so before the arrival of the Romans. Little is known about this settlement or the condition of the River Soar at this time, although roundhouses excavated from this era seem to have clustered along roughly 8 hectares (20 acres) of the east bank of the Soar. This area of the Soar was split into two channels: a main stream to the east and a narrower channel on the west, with a presumably marshy island between. The settlement seems to have controlled a ford across the larger channel. The later Roman name was a latinate form of the Brittonic word for "ramparts" (cf. Gaelic rath and the nearby villages of Ratby and Ratcliffe), suggesting the site was an oppidum. The plural form of the name suggests it was initially composed of several villages. The Celtic tribe holding the area was later recorded as the "Coritanians" but an inscription recovered in 1983 showed this to have been a corruption of the original "Corieltauvians". The Corieltauvians may have ruled over roughly the area of the East Midlands.

=== Roman ===
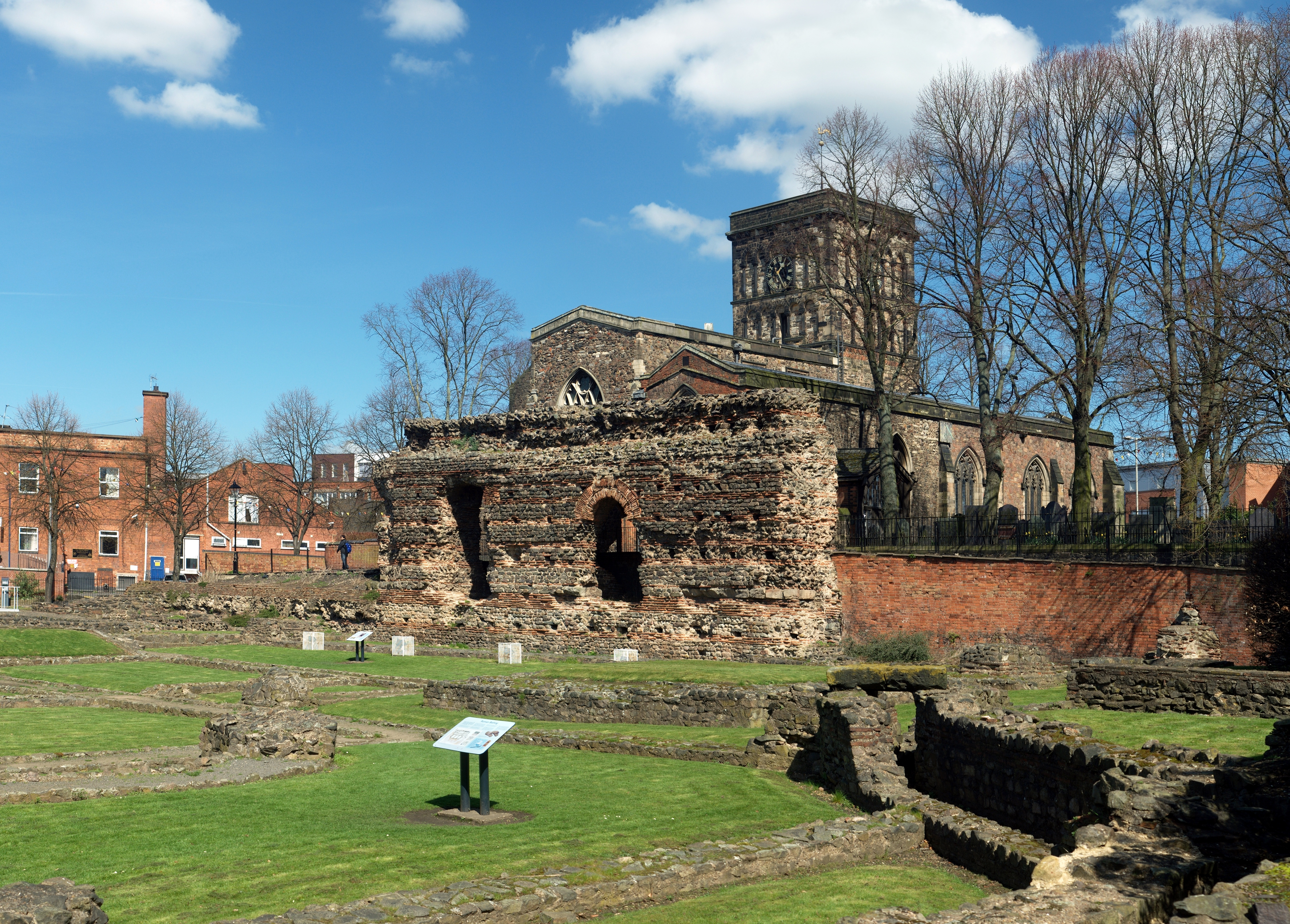
St Nicholas's Church and the Jewry Wall

It is believed that the Romans arrived in the Leicester area around AD 47, during their conquest of southern Britain. The Corieltauvian settlement lay near a bridge on the Fosse Way, a Roman road between the legionary camps at Isca (Exeter) and Lindum (Lincoln). It remains unclear whether the Romans fortified and garrisoned the location, but it slowly developed from around the year 50 onwards as the tribal capital of the Corieltauvians under the name Ratae Corieltauvorum. In the 2nd century, it received a forum and bathhouse. In 2013, the discovery of a Roman cemetery found just outside the old city walls and dating back to AD 300 was announced. The remains of the baths of Roman Leicester can be seen at the Jewry Wall; recovered artifacts are displayed at the adjacent museum.

=== Medieval ===
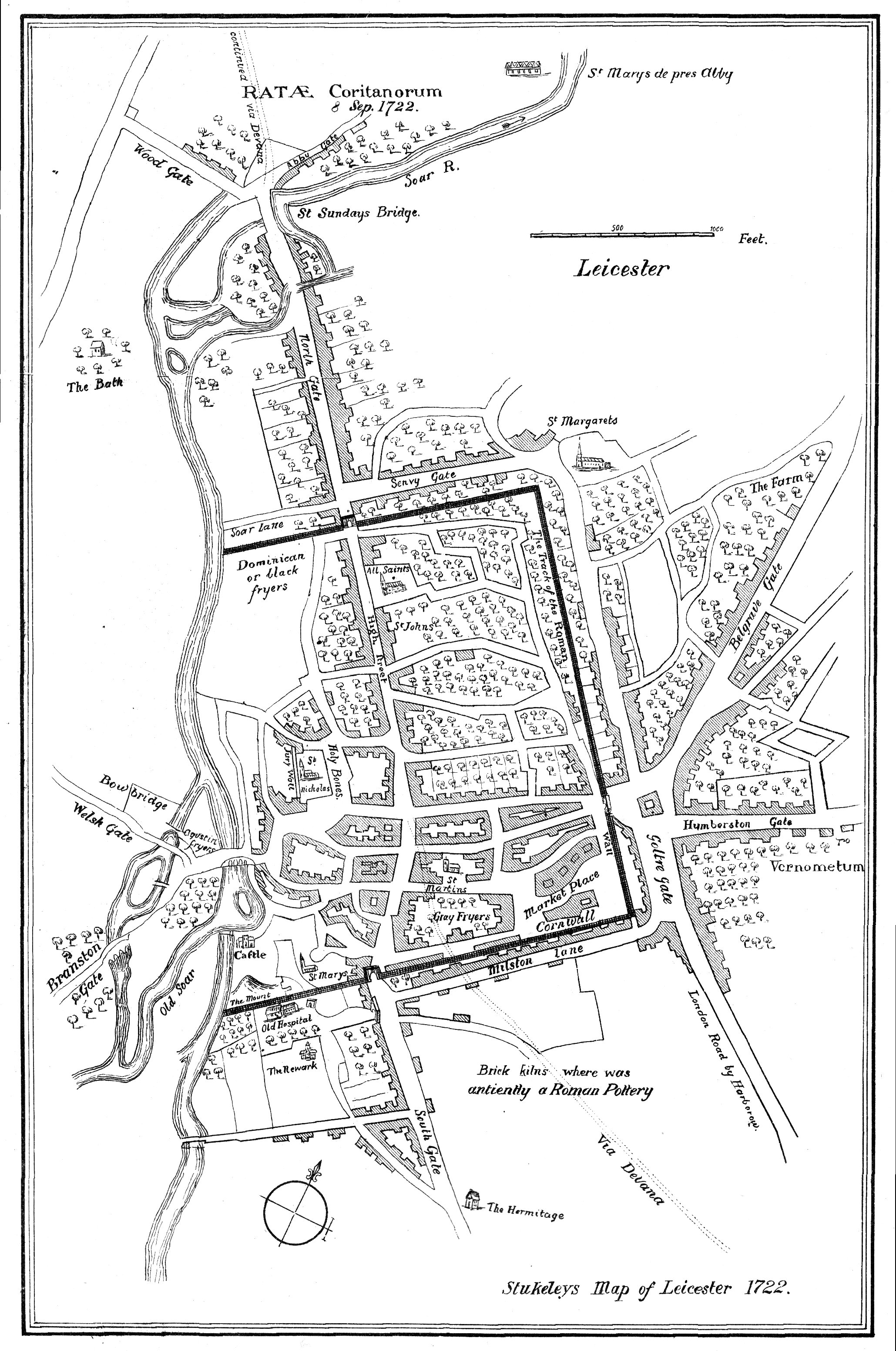
Map of Leicester Old Town

Knowledge of the town following the Roman withdrawal from Britain is limited. It seems to have been continually occupied after Roman protection ceased through the 5th and 6th centuries, although with a significantly reduced population. Its memory was preserved as the Cair Lerion of the History of the Britons. Following the Saxon invasion of Britain, Leicester was occupied by the Middle Angles and subsequently administered by the kingdom of Mercia. It was elevated to a bishopric in either 679 or 680; this see survived until the 9th century, when Leicester was captured by Danish Vikings. Their settlement became one of the Five Burghs of the Danelaw, although this position was short-lived. The Saxon bishop, meanwhile, fled to Dorchester-on-Thames and Leicester did not become a bishopric again until the parish church of St Martin became Leicester Cathedral in 1927. The settlement was recorded under the name Ligeraceaster in the early 10th century.

Following the Norman conquest, Leicester was recorded by William's Domesday Book as Ledecestre. It was noted as a city (civitas) but lost this status in the 11th century owing to power struggles between the Church and the aristocracy and did not become a legal city again until 1919.

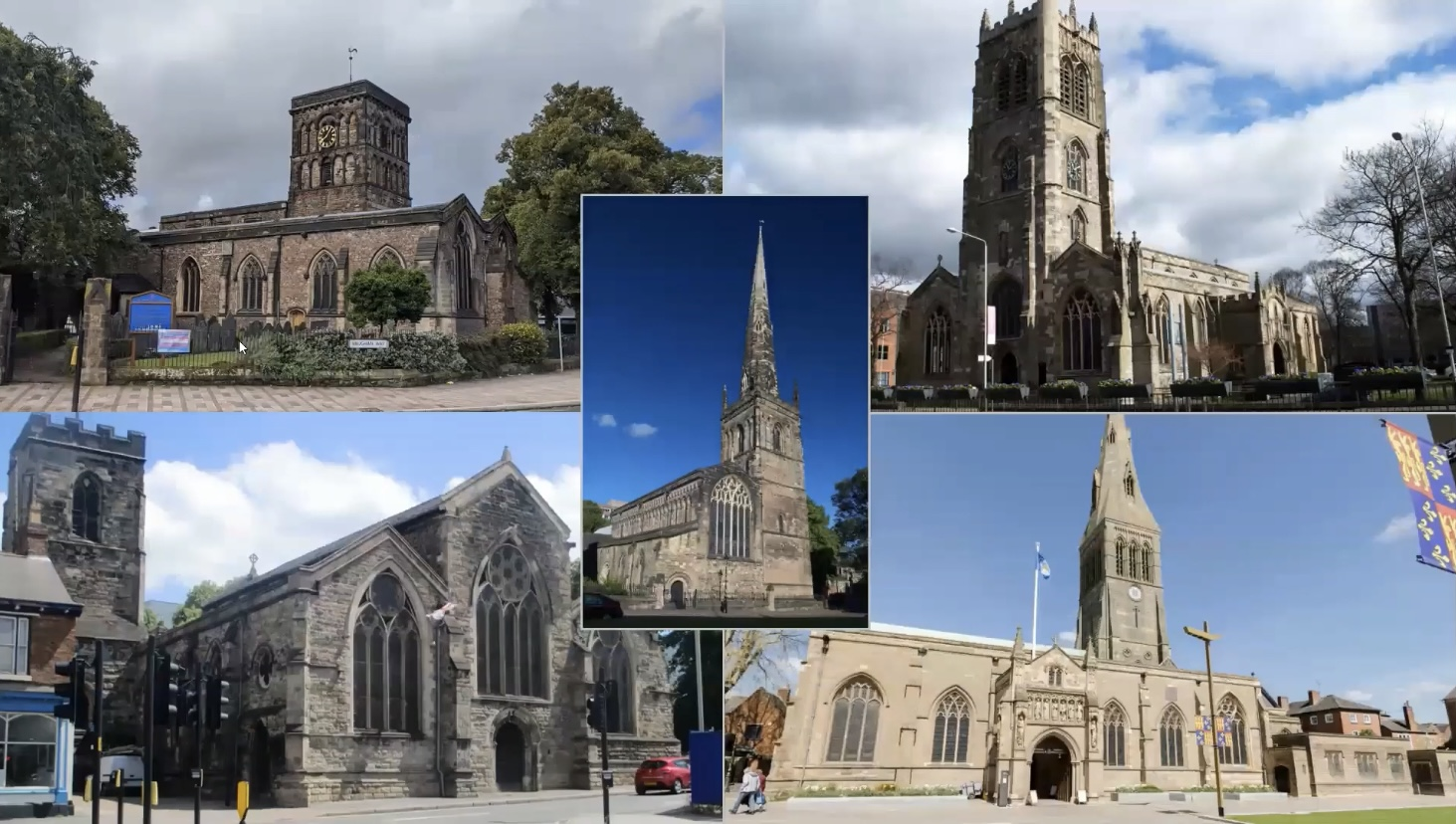
The five surviving medieval parish churches of Leicester: St Nicholas (top left), St Margaret's (top right), Leicester Cathedral (bottom right), All Saints (bottom left), and St Mary de Castro (centre).

Geoffrey of Monmouth composed his History of the Kings of Britain around the year 1136, naming a King Leir as an eponymous founder figure. According to Geoffrey's narrative, Cordelia had buried her father beneath the river in a chamber dedicated to Janus and his feast day was an annual celebration.

When Simon de Montfort became Earl of Leicester in 1231, he gave the borough a grant to expel the Jewish population "in my time or in the time of any of my heirs to the end of the world". He justified his action as being "for the good of my soul, and for the souls of my ancestors and successors". Leicester's Jews were allowed to move to the eastern suburbs, which were controlled by de Montfort's great-aunt and rival, Margaret, Countess of Winchester, after she took advice from the scholar and cleric Robert Grosseteste, at that time Archdeacon of Leicester. It would appear, however, that the expulsion was largely effective, and there is no evidence of any Jews remaining in Leicester. De Montfort's acts of anti-Jewish persecution in Leicester and elsewhere were part of a wider pattern that led to the expulsion of the Jewish population from England in 1290.

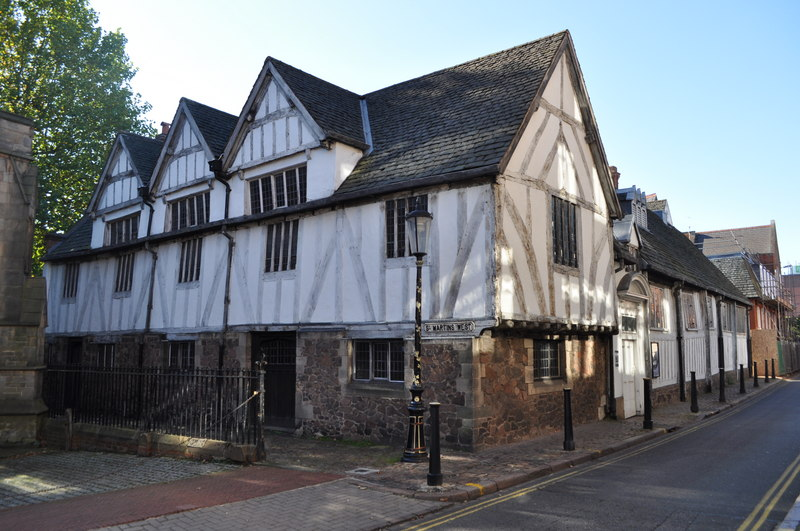
Leicester Guildhall, dating from the 14th century

During the 14th century, the earls of Leicester and Lancaster enhanced the prestige of the town. Henry, 3rd Earl of Lancaster and of Leicester founded a hospital for the poor and infirm in the area to the south of the castle now known as The Newarke (the "new work"). Henry's son, the great Henry of Grosmont, 4th Earl of Lancaster and of Leicester, who was made first Duke of Lancaster, enlarged and enhanced his father's foundation, and built the collegiate Church of the Annunciation of Our Lady of The Newarke. This church (a little of which survives in the basement of the Hawthorn Building of De Montfort University) was destroyed during the reign of King Edward VI. It became an important pilgrimage site because it housed a thorn said to be from the Crown of Thorns, given to the Duke by the King of France. The church (described by Leland in the C16th as "not large but exceeding fair") also became, effectively, a Lancastrian mausoleum. Duke Henry's daughter Blanche of Lancaster married John of Gaunt and their son Henry Bolingbroke became King Henry IV when he deposed King Richard II. The Church of the Annunciation was the burial place of Duke Henry, who had earlier had his father re-interred here. Later it became the burial place of Constance of Castile, Duchess of Lancaster (second wife of John of Gaunt) and of Mary de Bohun, first wife of Henry Bolingbroke (Henry IV) and mother of King Henry V (she did not become queen because she died before Bolingbroke became king). John of Gaunt died at Leicester Castle in 1399. When his son became king, the Earldom of Leicester and the Duchy of Lancaster became royal titles (and the latter remains so).

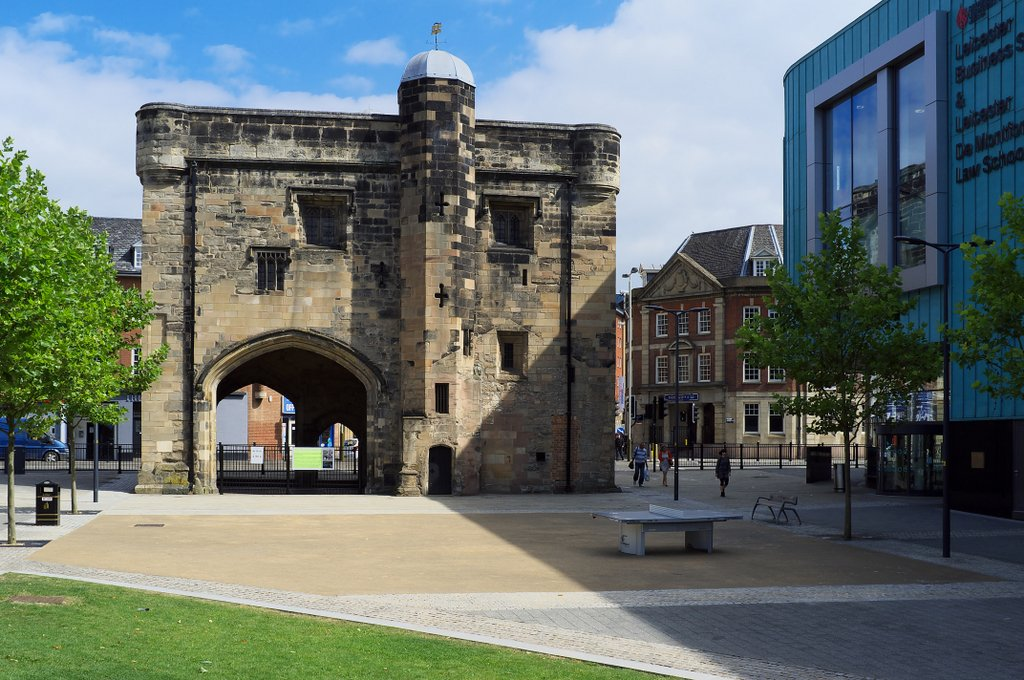
The Newarke Gateway or Magazine Gateway

At the end of the War of the Roses, King Richard III was buried in Leicester's Greyfriars Church a Franciscan Friary and Church which was demolished after its dissolution in 1538. The site of that church is now covered by King Richard III Visitor Centre (until 2012 by more modern buildings and a car park). There was a legend his corpse had been cast into the river, while some historians argued his tomb and remains were destroyed during the dissolution of the monasteries under Henry VIII. However, in September 2012, an archaeological investigation of the car park revealed a skeleton which DNA testing helped verify to be related to two descendants of Richard III's sister. It was concluded that the skeleton was that of Richard III because of the DNA evidence and the shape of the spine. In 2015 Richard III was reburied in pride of place near the high altar in Leicester Cathedral.

=== Modern ===
==== Tudor ====
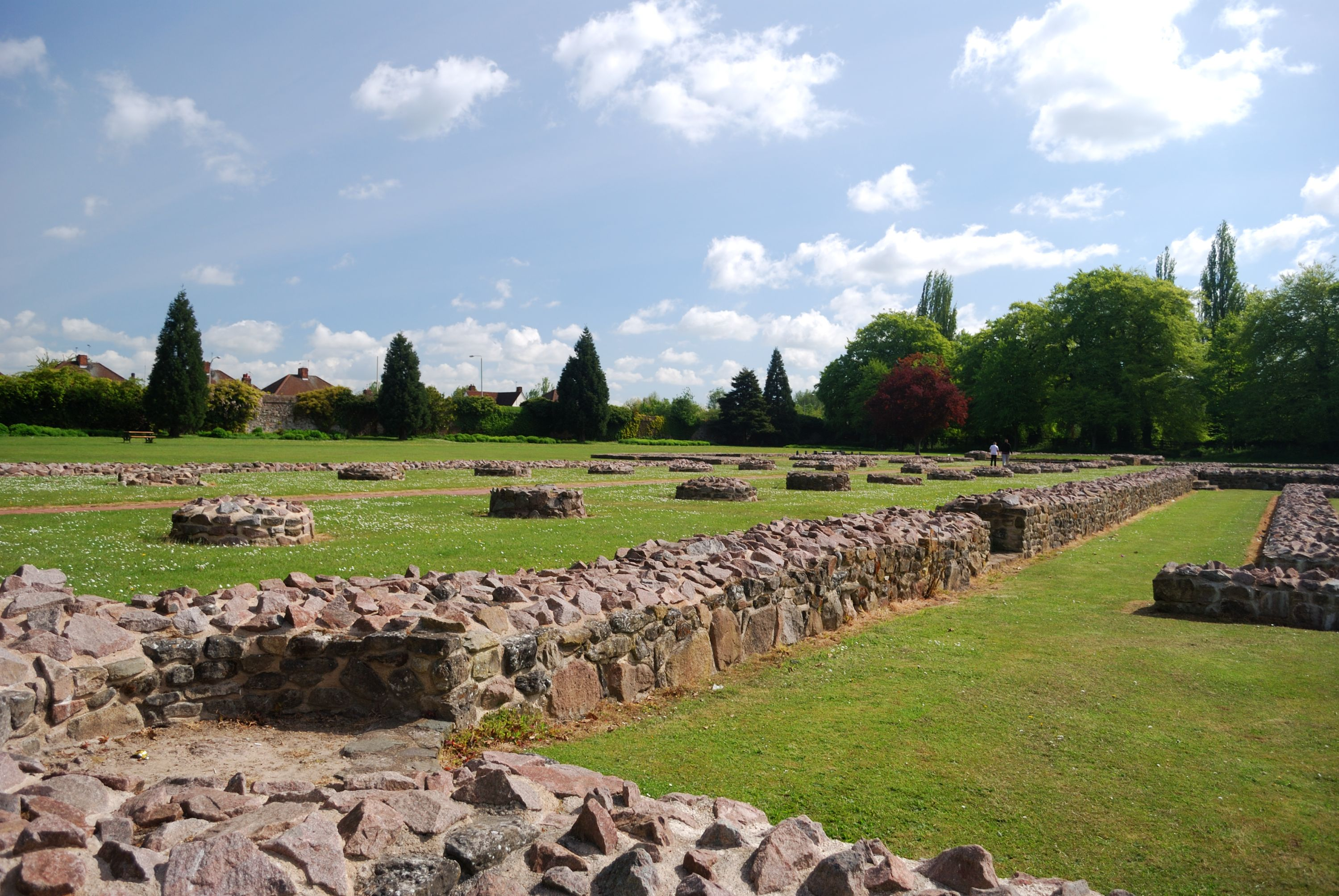
Leicester Abbey ruins, now part of Abbey Park

On 4 November 1530, Cardinal Thomas Wolsey was arrested on charges of treason and taken from Yorkshire. On his way south to face dubious justice at the Tower of London, he fell ill. The group escorting him was concerned enough to stop at Leicester to rest at Leicester Abbey. There, Wolsey's condition quickly worsened. He died on 29 November 1530 and was buried at Leicester Abbey, now Abbey Park.

Lady Jane Grey, who claimed the English throne for nine days in June 1553, was born at Bradgate Park near Leicester around 1536.

Queen Elizabeth I's intimate and former suitor, Robert Dudley, was given the Earldom of Leicester.

==== Stuart ====
After the Union of the Crowns, Anne of Denmark, Prince Henry, and Princess Elizabeth travelled to Leicester on 24 June 1603, after the courtier and usher Thomas Conway was assured that the town was free from infection or plague. Prince Charles, later King Charles I, travelled to London with his guardian Alexander Seton. The royal party stayed at Leicester for three days in August 1604 at the townhouse of William Skipwith.

The Corporation of Leicester opposed the efforts of Charles I to disafforest the nearby Leicester Forest, believing them to be likely to throw many of its residents into poverty and need of relief. Sir Miles Fleetwood was sent to commission the disafforestation and division of lands being used in common. Riots destroyed enclosures in spring 1627 and 1628, following a pattern of anti-enclosure disturbances found elsewhere including the Western Rising.

Petitions challenging the enclosures were presented by the Corporation of Leicester and borough residents to the King and Privy Council. They were unsuccessful so petitioned the House of Lords in June 1628 who however supported Fleetwood but asked for proceedings made by the Crown against the rioters to be dropped. Compensation made to the legal residents of the forest was reasonably generous by comparison with other forests. The Corporation of Leicester received 40 acres (16 ha) for relief of the poor.

==== Civil War ====
Leicester was a Parliamentarian (colloquially called Roundhead) stronghold during the English Civil War. In 1645, King Charles I of England and Prince Rupert decided to attack the (then) town to draw the New Model Army away from the Royalist (colloquially called Cavaliers) headquarters of Oxford. Royalist guns were set up on Raw Dykes and, after an unsatisfactory response to a demand for surrender, the assault began at 3pm on 30 May 1645 by a Royalist battery opposite the Newarke. The town – which only had approximately 2,000 defenders opposed to the Royalist Army of approximately 10,000 combatants – was sacked on 31 May 1645, and hundreds of people were killed by Rupert's cavalry. It was reported that 120 houses had been destroyed and that 140 wagons of plunder were sent to the Royalist stronghold of Newark.

Following the Parliamentarian victory over the Royalist Army at the Battle of Naseby on 14 June 1645, Leicester was recovered by Parliament on 18 June 1645.

==== Industrial era ====
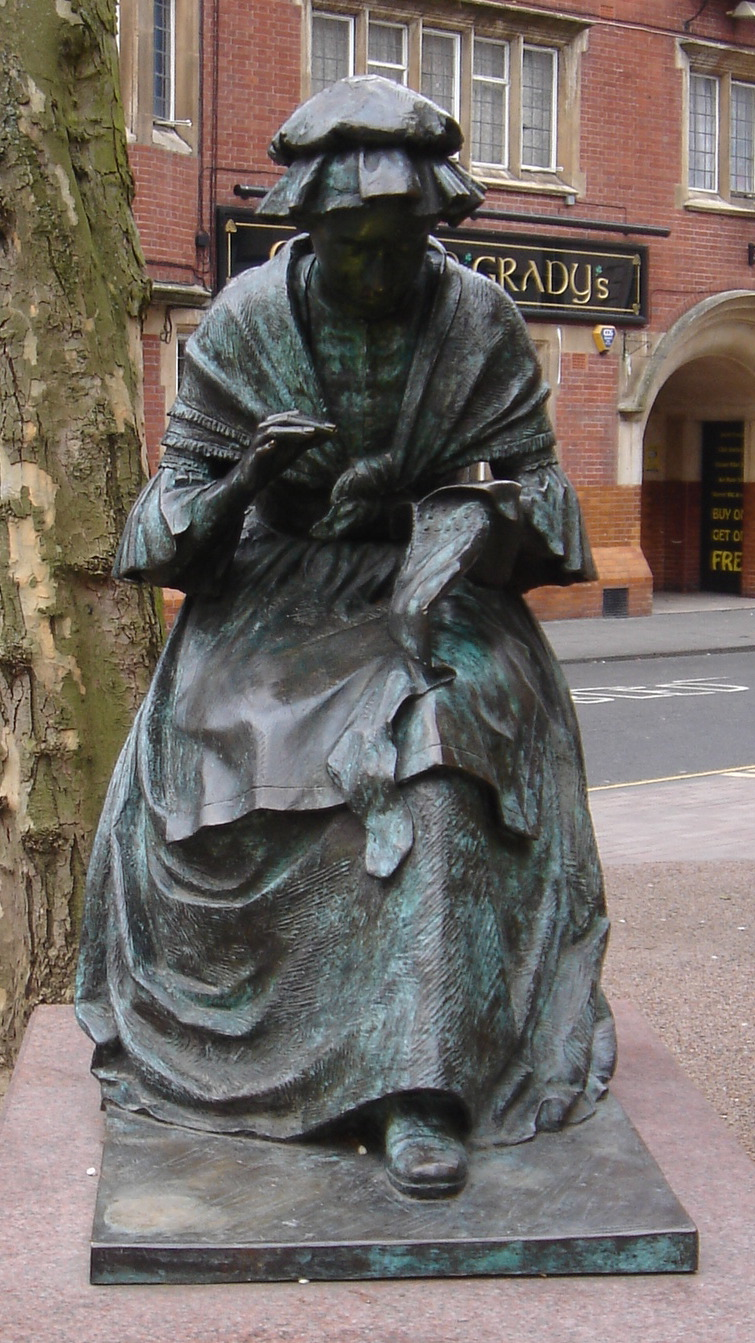
The Leicester Seamstress by James Walter Butler (1990) Leicester, Hotel Street

The construction of the Grand Union Canal in the 1790s linked Leicester to London and Birmingham. The first railway station in Leicester opened in 1832, in the form of the Leicester and Swannington Railway which provided a supply of coal to the town from nearby collieries. The Midland Counties Railway (running from Derby to Rugby) linked the town to the national network by 1840. A direct link to London St Pancras was established by the Midland Railway in the 1860s. These developments encouraged and accompanied a process of industrialisation which intensified throughout the reign of Queen Victoria. Factories began to appear, particularly along the canal and river, and districts such as Frog Island and Woodgate were the locations of numerous large mills. Between 1861 and 1901, Leicester's population increased from 68,100 to 211,600 and the proportion employed in trade, commerce, building, and the city's new factories and workshops rose steadily. Hosiery, textiles, and footwear became the major industrial employers: manufacturers such as N. Corah & Sons and the Cooperative Boot and Shoe Company were opening some of the largest manufacturing premises in Europe. They were joined, in the latter part of the century, by engineering firms such as Kent Street's Taylor and Hubbard (crane makers and founders), Vulcan Road's William Gimson & Company (steam boilers and founders), Martin Street's Richards & Company (steel works and founders), and British United Shoe Machinery Co (manufacturer of footwear machinery and materials).

The politics of Victorian Leicester were lively and very often bitter. Years of consistent economic growth meant living standards generally increased, but Leicester was a stronghold of Radicalism. Thomas Cooper, the Chartist, kept a shop in Church Gate. There were serious Chartist riots in the town in 1842 and again six years later. The Leicester Secular Society was founded in 1851 but secularist speakers such as George Holyoake were often denied the use of speaking halls. It was not until 1881 that Leicester Secular Hall was opened. The second half of the 19th century also witnessed the creation of many other institutions, including the town council, the Royal Infirmary, and the Leicester Constabulary. It also benefited from general acceptance (and the powers given by the Public Health Acts) that municipal organisations had a responsibility to provide for the town's water supply, drainage, and sanitation. In 1853, backed with a guarantee of dividends by the Corporation of Leicester the Leicester Waterworks Company built a reservoir at Thornton for the supply of water to the town. This guarantee was made possible by the Public Health Act 1847 and an amending local act of Parliament, the Leicester Waterworks Amendment Act 1851 (14 & 15 Vict. c. xxxiii). In 1866 another amending act, the Leicester Waterworks Act 1866 (29 & 30 Vict. c. xxvii), enabled the Corporation of Leicester to take shares in the company to enable the construction of another reservoir at Cropston, completed in 1870. The Corporation of Leicester was later able to buy the waterworks and build another reservoir at Swithland, completed in the 1890s.

Leicester became a county borough in 1889, although it was abolished in 1974 as part of the Local Government Act 1972, and was reformed as a non-metropolitan district and city. The city regained its unitary status, being administered separately from Leicestershire, in 1997. The borough had been expanding throughout the 19th century, but grew most notably when it annexed Belgrave, Aylestone, North Evington, Knighton, and Stoneygate in 1892.

==== Early 20th century ====
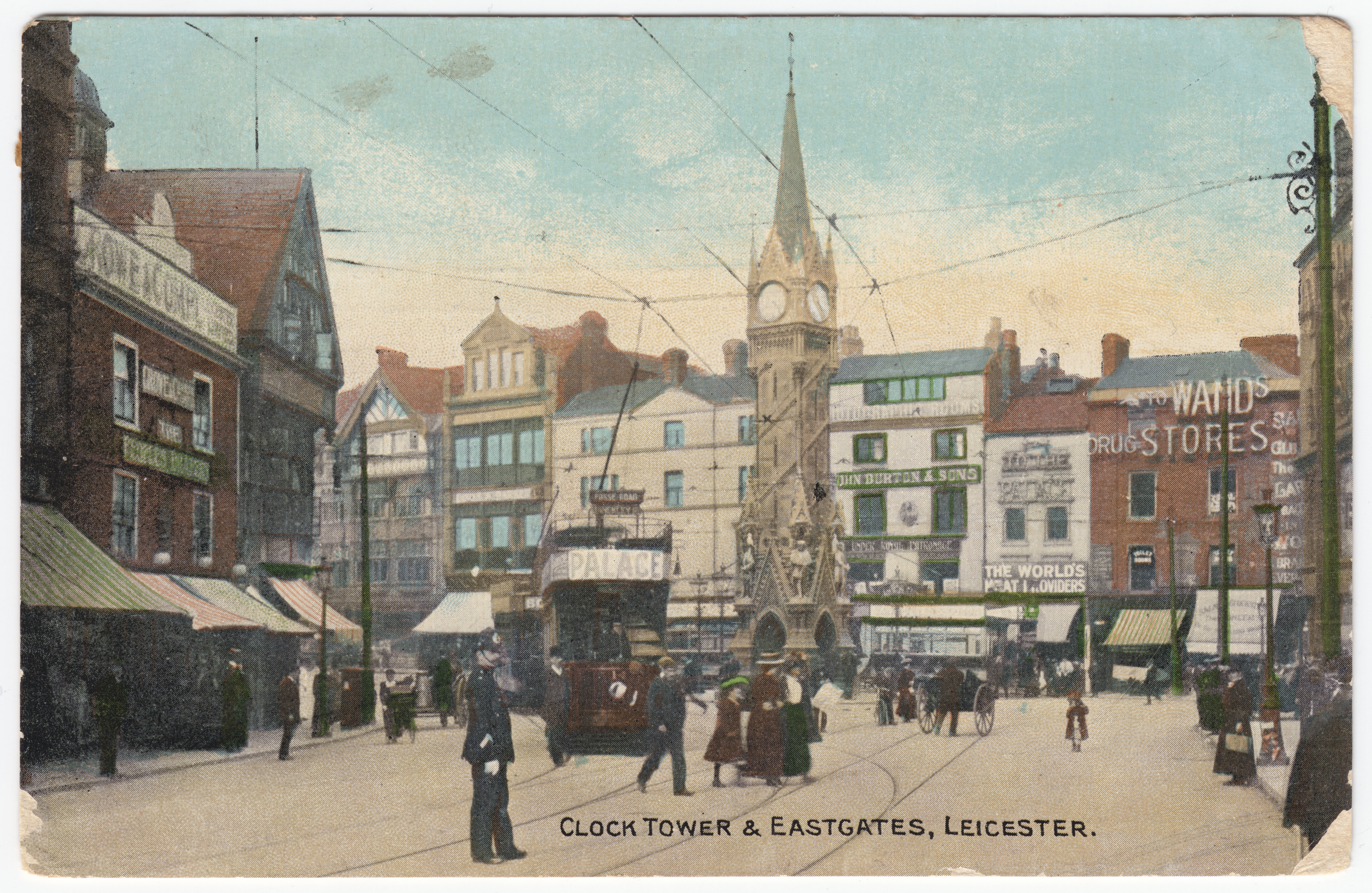
Edwardian city centre

In 1900, the Great Central Railway provided another link to London, but the rapid population growth of the previous decades had already begun to slow by the time of Queen Victoria's death in 1901. World War I and the subsequent epidemics had further impacts. Nonetheless, Leicester was finally recognised as a legal city once more in 1919 in recognition of its contribution to the British war effort. Recruitment to the armed forces was lower in Leicester than in other English cities, partly because of the low level of unemployment and the need for many of its industries, such as clothing and footwear manufacturing, to supply the army. As the war progressed, many of Leicester's factories were given over to arms production; Leicester produced the first batch of Howitzer shells by a British company which was not making ammunition before the war. After the war, the city received a royal visit; the king and queen received a march-past in Victoria Park of thousands of serving and demobilised soldiers. Following the end of the war, a memorial arch—the Arch of Remembrance—was built in Victoria Park and unveiled in 1925. The arch, one of the largest First World War memorials in the UK, was designed by Sir Edwin Lutyens, who also designed the Cenotaph in London and is a grade I listed building. A set of gates and lodges, again by Lutyens, were added in the 1930s, leading to the memorial from the University Road and London Road entrances to Victoria Park.

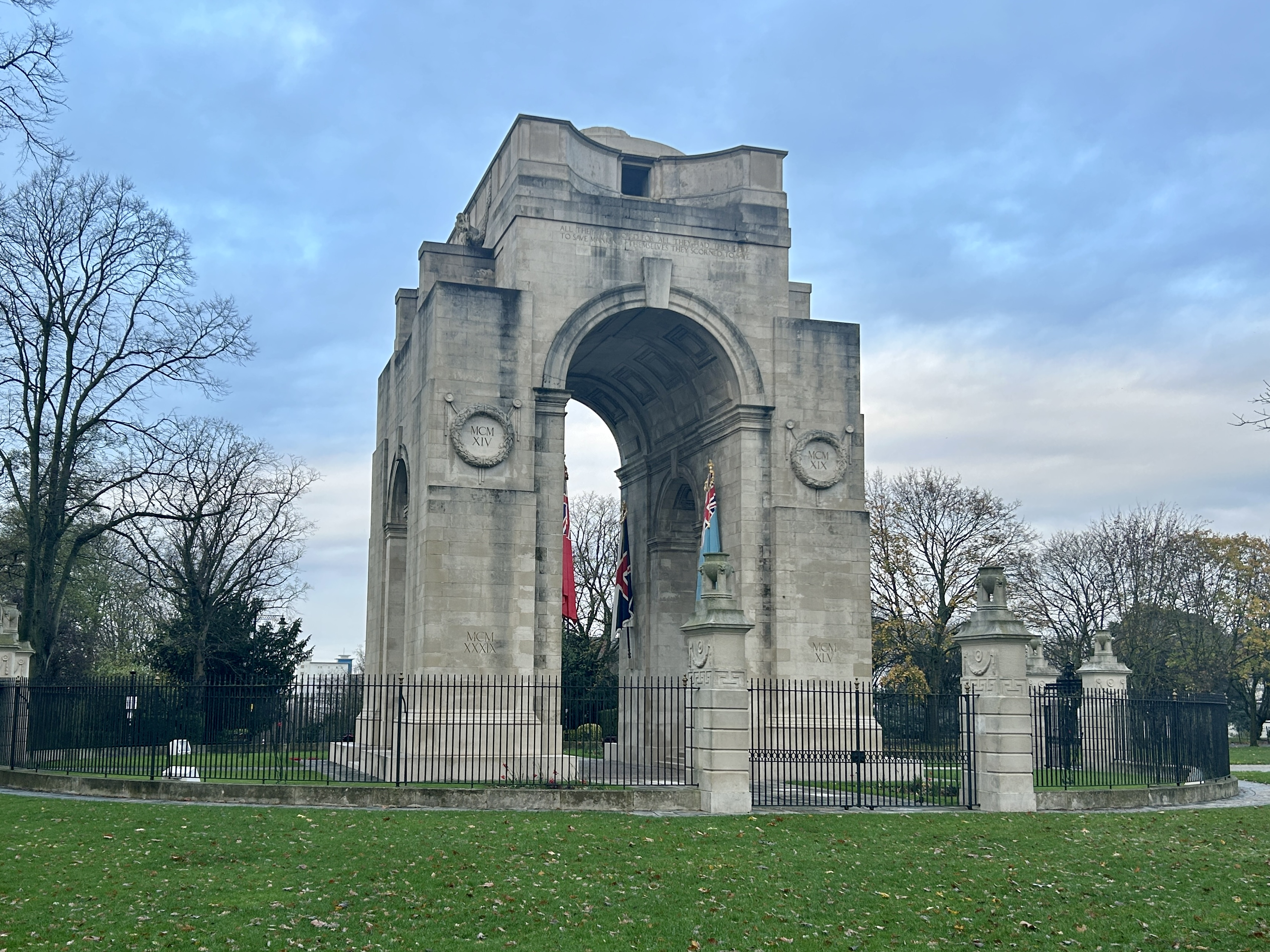
The Arch of Remembrance in Victoria Park

In 1927, Leicester became a cathedral city again on the consecration of St Martin's Church as the cathedral. A second major extension to the boundaries following the changes in 1892 took place in 1935, with the annexation of the remainder of Evington, Humberstone, Beaumont Leys, and part of Braunstone. A third major revision of the boundaries took place in 1966, with the net addition to the city of just over 450 acres (182 ha). The boundary has remained unchanged since that time.

Leicester's diversified economic base and lack of dependence on primary industries meant it was much better placed than many other cities to weather the tariff wars of the 1920s and Great Depression of the 1930s. The Bureau of Statistics of the newly formed League of Nations identified Leicester in 1936 as the second-richest city in Europe and it became an attractive destination for refugees fleeing persecution and political turmoil in continental Europe. Firms such as Corah and Liberty Shoes used their reputation for producing high-quality products to expand their businesses. These years witnessed the growth in the city of trade unionism and particularly the co-operative movement. The Co-op became an important employer and landowner; when Leicester played host to the Jarrow March on its way to London in 1936, the Co-op provided the marchers with a change of boots. In 1938, Leicester was selected as the base for Squadron 1F, the first A.D.C.C (Air Defence Cadet Corp), the predecessor of the Air Training Corps.

==== World War II ====
Leicester was bombed on 19 November 1940. Although only three bombs hit the city, 108 people were killed in Highfields.

=== Contemporary ===
The years after World War II, particularly from the 1960s onwards, brought many social and economic challenges.

==== Urban expansion; central rapprochement ====
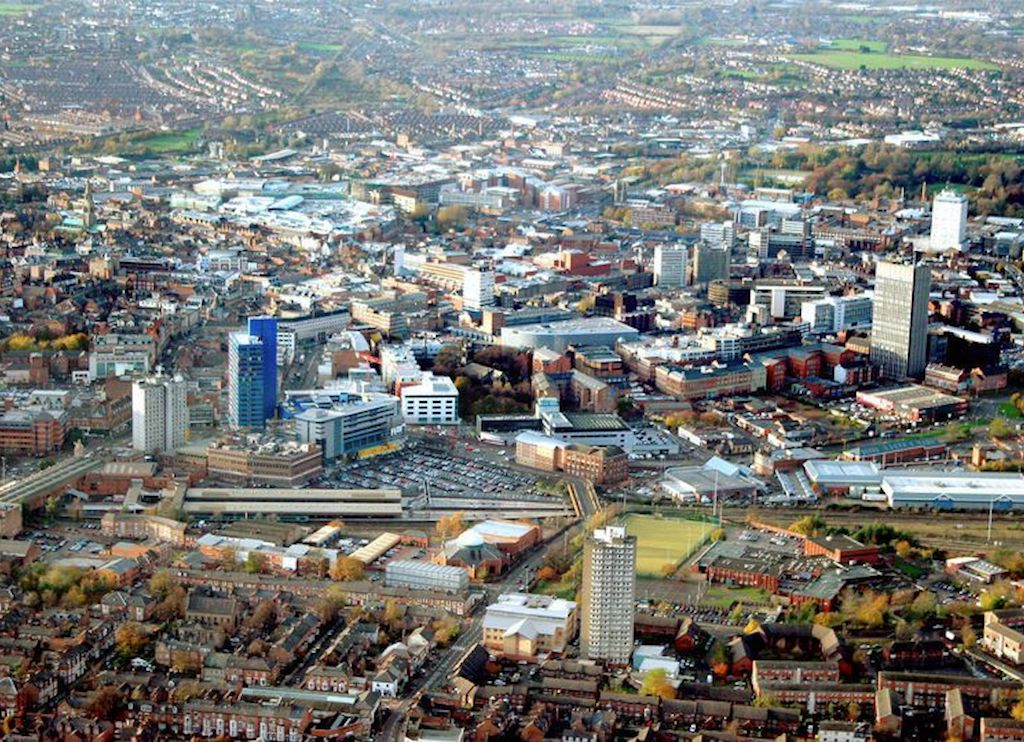
Central Leicester (looking WNW)

Mass housebuilding continued across Leicester for some 30 years after 1945. Existing housing estates such as Braunstone were expanded, while several completely new estates – of both private and council tenure – were built. The last major development of this era was Beaumont Leys in the north of the city, which was developed in the 1970s as a mix of private and council housing.

There was a steady decline in Leicester's traditional manufacturing industries and, in the city centre, working factories and light industrial premises have now been almost entirely replaced. Many former factories, including some on Frog Island and at Donisthorpe Mill, have been badly damaged by fire. Rail and barge were finally eclipsed by automotive transport in the 1960s and 1970s: the Great Central and the Leicester and Swannington both closed and the northward extension of the M1 motorway linked Leicester into England's growing motorway network. With the loss of much of the city's industry during the 1970s and 1980s, some of the old industrial jobs were replaced by new jobs in the service sector, particularly in retail. The opening of the Haymarket Shopping Centre in 1971 was followed by a number of new shopping centres in the city, including St Martin's Shopping Centre in 1984 and the Shire Shopping Centre in 1992. The Shires was subsequently expanded in September 2008 and rebranded as Highcross. By the 1990s, as well, Leicester's central position and good transport links had established it as a distribution centre; the southwestern area of the city has also attracted new service and manufacturing businesses.

==== Immigration ====
1972 advertisement in the Uganda Argus newspaper to discourage Ugandan Asians from settling in Leicester

Since World War II Leicester has experienced large scale immigration from across the world. Many Polish servicemen were prevented from returning to their homeland after the war by the communist regime, and they established a small community in Leicester. Economic migrants from the Irish Republic continued to arrive throughout the post war period. Immigrants from the Indian sub-continent began to arrive in the 1960s, their numbers boosted by Asians arriving from Kenya and Uganda in the early 1970s.

In 1972, Idi Amin announced that the entire Asian community in Uganda had 90 days to leave the country. Shortly thereafter, Leicester City Council launched a campaign aimed at dissuading Ugandan Asians from migrating to the city. The adverts did not have their intended effect, instead making more migrants aware of the possibility of settling in Leicester. Nearly a quarter of initial Ugandan refugees (around 5000 to 6000) settled in Leicester, and by the end of the 1970s around another quarter of the initially dispersed refugees had made their way to Leicester. Officially, the adverts were taken out for fear that immigrants to Leicester would place pressure on city services and at least one person who was a city councillor at the time says he believes they were placed for racist reasons. The initial advertisement was widely condemned, and taken as a marker of anti-Asian sentiment throughout Britain as a whole, although the attitudes that resulted in the initial advertisement were changed significantly in subsequent decades, not least because the immigrants included the owners of many of "Uganda's most successful businesses."

Forty years later, Leicester's mayor Sir Peter Soulsby expressed his regret for the behaviour of the council at the time.

In the 1990s, a group of Dutch citizens of Somali origin settled in the city. Since the 2004 enlargement of the European Union a significant number of East European migrants have settled in the city. While some wards in the northeast of the city are more than 70% South Asian, wards in the west and south are all over 70% white. The Commission for Racial Equality (CRE) had estimated that by 2011 Leicester would have approximately a 50% ethnic minority population, making it the first city in Britain not to have a white British majority. This prediction was based on the growth of the ethnic minority populations between 1991 (Census 1991 28% ethnic minority) and 2001 (Census 2001 – 36% ethnic minority). However, Professor Ludi Simpson at the University of Manchester School of Social Sciences said in September 2007 that the CRE had "made unsubstantiated claims and ignored government statistics" and that Leicester's immigrant and minority communities disperse to other places. The 2011 census showed that the population of Leicester was 50% White or 45% White British, if other white ethnicities were excluded.

The Leicester Multicultural Advisory Group is a forum, set up in 2001 by the editor of the Leicester Mercury, to co-ordinate community relations with members representing the council, police, schools, community and faith groups, and the media.

==== Coronavirus ====
The COVID-19 pandemic has brought many social and economic challenges across the country and across the world. Leicester has been particularly badly affected in the United Kingdom; from July 2020 during the imposition of the first local lockdown which saw all non-essential retail closed again and businesses such as public houses, restaurants and hairdressers unable to reopen. Businesses such as these in areas such as Glenfield and that part of Braunstone Town which outside of the formal city council area, have since been allowed to reopen following a more tightly defined lockdown area from 18 July 2020.

==== City boundary expansion ====
Interactive map of new boundaries

In July 2026, the government approved plans for a large expansion of Leicester's city boundaries to include Great Glen, Oadby, Wigston, Blaby, Enderby, Braunstone Town, Glenfield, Anstey, Birstall and Syston. This will see the city's population increase from around 372,000 to around 623,000. The changes are controversial, and are planned to be implemented in April 2028.

== Geography ==
The Office for National Statistics has defined a Leicester Urban Area (LUA); broadly the immediate Leicester conurbation, although without administrative status. The LUA contains the unitary authority area and several towns, villages and suburbs outside the city's administrative boundaries.

=== Areas and suburbs ===
Map of Leicester showing some of the localities and suburbs

Suburbs and districts of Leicester (ancient villages now incorporated into the city are shown in bold)

- Abbey Rise
- Ashton Green
- **Aylestone**
- Beaumont Leys
- Bede Island
- **Belgrave**
- Blackfriars
- Braunstone
- Braunstone Frith
- Bradgate Heights
- City Centre
- Clarendon Park
- Crown Hills
- Dane Hills
- **Evington**
- Evington Valley
- Eyres Monsell
- Frog Island
- Goodwood
- Hamilton
- Highfields
- Horston Hill
- **Humberstone**
- Humberstone Garden
- Kirby Frith
- **Knighton**
- Mowmacre Hill
- Netherhall
- Newfoundpool
- New Parks
- North Evington
- Northfields
- Rowlatts Hill
- Rowley Fields
- Rushey Mead
- Saffron
- Southfields
- South Knighton
- Spinney Hills
- Stocking Farm
- Stoneygate
- St. Matthew's
- St. Mark's
- St. Peters
- Thurnby Lodge
- West End
- West Knighton
- Western Park
- Woodgate

=== Climate ===
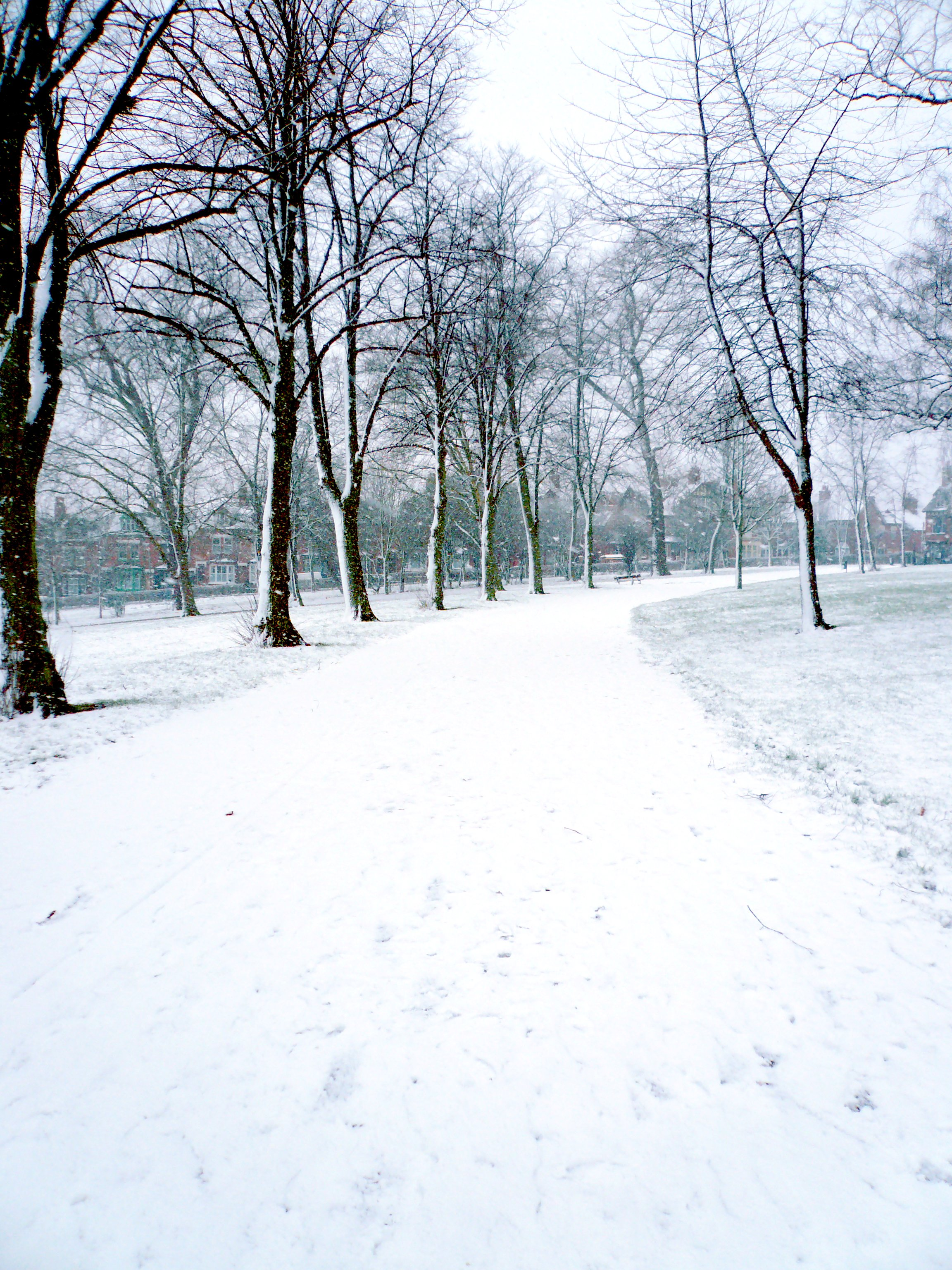
Snow in Spinney Hill Park, 2007

Leicester experiences a maritime climate with mild to warm summers and cool winters, rain spread throughout the year, and low sunshine levels. The nearest official Weather Station was Newtown Linford, about 5 miles (8.0 km) northwest of Leicester city centre and just outside the edge of the urban area. However, observations stopped there in 2003. The current nearest weather station is Market Bosworth, about 10 miles (16 km) west of the city centre.

The highest temperature recorded at Newtown Linford was 34.5 °C (94.1 °F) during August 1990, although a temperature of 35.1 °C (95.2 °F) was achieved at Leicester University during August 2003. However, the highest temperature since records began in Leicester is 36.7 °C (98.1 °F) on 15 July 1868. More typically the highest temperature would reach 28.7 °C (83.7 °F) – the average annual maximum. 11.3 days of the year should attain a temperature of 25.1 °C (77.2 °F) or above.

The lowest temperature recorded at Newtown Linford was −16.1 °C (3.0 °F) during January 1963. Typically, 54.9 air frosts will be recorded during the course of the year.

Rainfall averages 684.4 mm per year, with 1 mm or more falling on 120.8 days. All averages refer to the period 1971–2000.

Climate data for Newtown Linford, (Note: Weather station is located 5 miles (8 km) from the Leicester city centre.) elevation: 119 m (390 ft), 1971–2000 normals, extremes 1960–2002
Month	Jan	Feb	Mar	Apr	May	Jun	Jul	Aug	Sep	Oct	Nov	Dec	Year
Record high °C (°F)	13.6 (56.5)	16.3 (61.3)	21.7 (71.1)	23.9 (75.0)	26.5 (79.7)	31.5 (88.7)	35.0 (95.0)	34.5 (94.1)	27.7 (81.9)	23.3 (73.9)	16.2 (61.2)	14.6 (58.3)	35.0 (95.0)
Mean daily maximum °C (°F)	6.7 (44.1)	7.0 (44.6)	9.9 (49.8)	12.4 (54.3)	16.2 (61.2)	18.8 (65.8)	21.6 (70.9)	21.2 (70.2)	17.8 (64.0)	13.7 (56.7)	9.3 (48.7)	7.5 (45.5)	13.5 (56.3)
Daily mean °C (°F)	3.6 (38.5)	3.8 (38.8)	6.1 (43.0)	7.9 (46.2)	11.2 (52.2)	13.9 (57.0)	16.2 (61.2)	16.1 (61.0)	13.4 (56.1)	9.9 (49.8)	6.2 (43.2)	4.3 (39.7)	9.4 (48.9)
Mean daily minimum °C (°F)	0.5 (32.9)	0.5 (32.9)	2.1 (35.8)	3.3 (37.9)	6.0 (42.8)	8.7 (47.7)	10.8 (51.4)	10.7 (51.3)	8.8 (47.8)	6.0 (42.8)	2.8 (37.0)	1.3 (34.3)	5.1 (41.2)
Record low °C (°F)	−16.1 (3.0)	−11.7 (10.9)	−11.1 (12.0)	−6.6 (20.1)	−3.3 (26.1)	−0.9 (30.4)	2.8 (37.0)	2.8 (37.0)	0.0 (32.0)	−6.2 (20.8)	−7.4 (18.7)	−14.4 (6.1)	−16.1 (3.0)
Average precipitation mm (inches)	61.7 (2.43)	48.9 (1.93)	51.9 (2.04)	51.5 (2.03)	50.8 (2.00)	63.1 (2.48)	46.1 (1.81)	59.3 (2.33)	61.5 (2.42)	60.6 (2.39)	60.3 (2.37)	68.8 (2.71)	684.4 (26.94)
Average precipitation days (≥ 1.0 mm)	12.1	10.2	11.6	9.7	9.1	9.6	7.8	8.8	9.3	10.2	10.7	11.7	120.8
Source: KNMI (Note: Data calculated from raw monthly term data)

== Governance ==
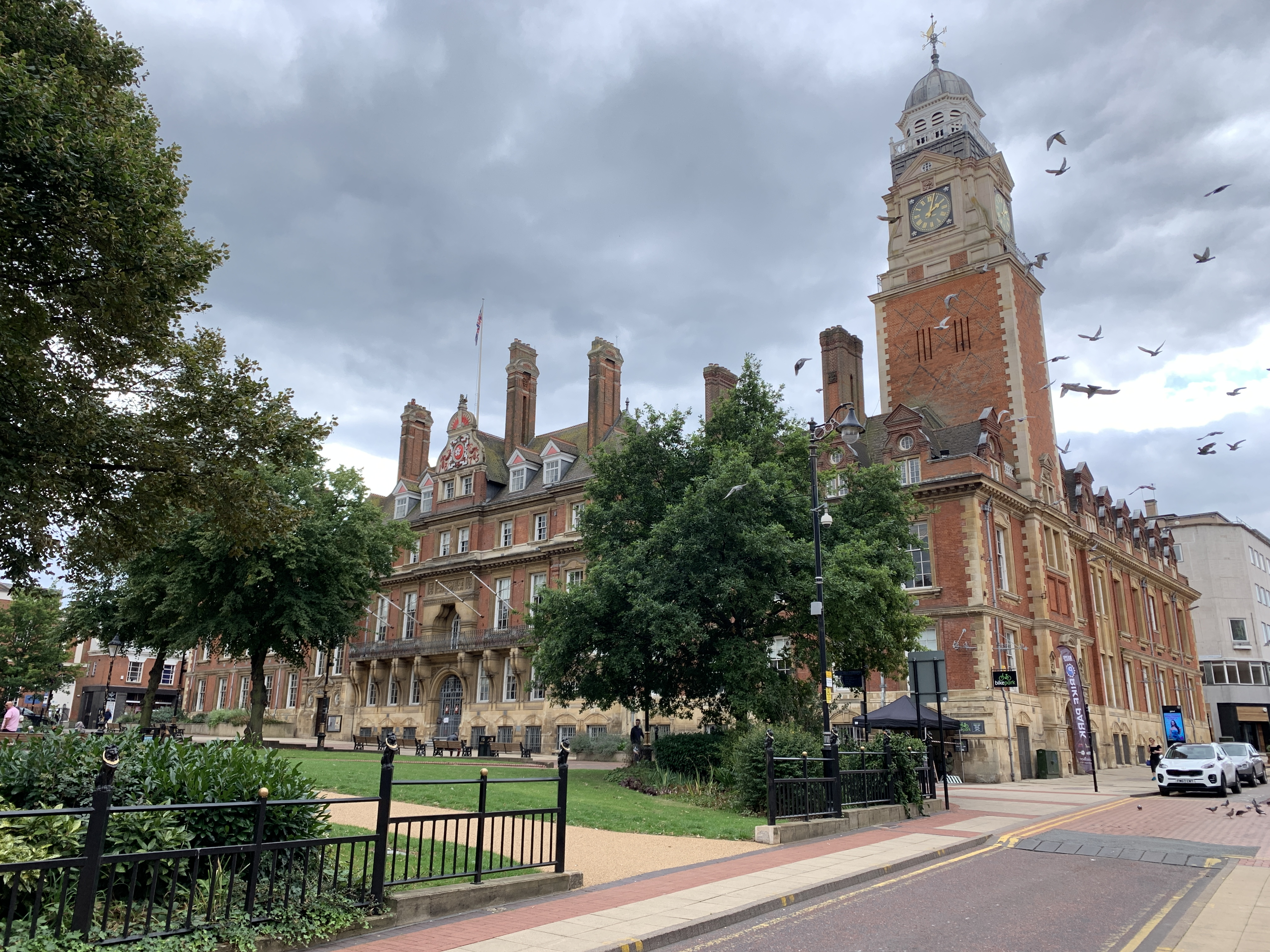
Leicester Town Hall, completed in 1876

On 5 May 2011, the directly elected Mayor of Leicester role came into effect after the inaugural election. This post exists in addition to that of Lord Mayor which goes back to the Middle Ages and is these days a ceremonial role.

The first mayor of Leicester was a Norman knight, Peter fitz Roger ("Peter, son of Roger") in 1251. Following the restoration of city status in 1919 this title was elevated to "Lord Mayor." In 1987 the first Asian Mayor of Leicester was indirectly elected by the councillors, Councillor Gordhan Parmar. After institution of a directly elected mayor in 2011 the Lord Mayor of Leicester still exists as a ceremonial role under Leicester City Council.

On 1 April 1997, Leicester City Council became a unitary authority. Previously, local government had been a two-tier system: the city and county councils were responsible for different aspects of local-government services. That system is still in place in the rest of Leicestershire. Leicestershire County Council retained its headquarters at County Hall in Glenfield, just outside the city boundary but within the urban area. The administrative offices of Leicester City Council are in the centre of the city at City Hall in Charles Street, having moved from Welford Place. The 1970s council offices at Welford Place were declared unsafe in 2010 and demolished on 22 February 2015. In 2018 a newly built New Walk Centre was completed as a privately funded mix of offices, shops and flats, alongside tree-lined open spaces. Some services (particularly the police and the ambulance service) still cover the whole of the city and county, but for the most part the councils are independent.

Leicester is divided into 21 electoral wards: Abbey, Aylestone, Beaumont Leys, Belgrave, Braunstone Park & Rowley Fields, Castle, Evington, Eyres Monsell, Fosse, Humberstone & Hamilton, Knighton, North Evington, Rushey Mead, Saffron, Spinney Hills, Stoneygate, Thurncourt, Troon, Westcotes, Western, and Wycliffe.

=== Political control ===
The current directly elected mayor is Sir Peter Soulsby of the Labour Party.

After a long period of Labour administration (since 1979), the city council from May 2003 was run by a Liberal Democrat/Conservative coalition under Roger Blackmore, which collapsed in November 2004. The minority Labour group ran the city until May 2005, under Ross Willmott, when the Liberal Democrats and Conservatives formed a new coalition, again under the leadership of Roger Blackmore.

In the local government elections of 3 May 2007, Leicester's Labour Party once again took control of the council in what can be described as a landslide victory. Gaining 18 new councillors, Labour polled on the day 38 councillors, creating a governing majority of +20. Significantly however, the Green Party gained its first councillors in the Castle Ward, after losing on the drawing of lots in 2003, though one of these subsequently resigned and the seat was lost to Labour in a by-election on 10 September 2009. The Conservative Party saw a decrease in their representation. The Liberal Democrat Party was the major loser, dropping from 25 councillors in 2003 to only 6 in 2007. This was in part due to the local party splitting, with a number of councillors standing for the Liberal Party.

In the local government elections of 5 May 2011 and those of May 2015, Labour won 52 of the city's 54 seats, with the Conservatives and Liberal Democrats winning one seat each. In the 2019 local elections, the Labour Party gained the sole Conservative held ward of Knighton leaving Nigel Porter of the Liberal Democrats as the only opposition member on the city council.

The current composition of Leicester City Council is as follows:

Party	Councillors
Labour	31
Conservative	15
Green	3
Liberal Democrats	3
One Leicester	1
Independent	1
Total	54

There have been four changes in party affiliation since the last full council election in May 2023. Councillor Diane Cank left the Labour group in August 2023. Councillor Sanjay Modhwadia, the Conservative Party candidate in the 2024 Leicester mayoral election, was suspended from the Conservative Party following an argument with group leader Deepak Bajaj in a public car park over who should be the next group leader. Conservative group leader Deepak Bajaj subsequently defected to the Labour Party on 8 April, lambasting a culture of violence, racism, religious divides, threats and bullying within the Conservative Party in Leicester. The conservative group was further reduced in June 2024 when councillor Nagarjun "Nags" Agath quit the party to stand as an independent candidate in Leicester East in the 2024 United Kingdom general election. Agath cited displeasure in the choice of the Conservative candidate, Shivani Raja, as his reason to stand, branding her as an "inexperienced candidate" that had been "dumped" on the city.

=== Representation at Westminster ===
In the 2024 general election, Leicester is divided into three Parliamentary constituencies: Leicester East, represented by Conservative Party MP Shivani Raja, Leicester South, represented by independent MP Shockat Adam, and Leicester West represented by Work and Pensions Secretary Liz Kendall of the Labour Party.

=== Coat of arms ===
Arms of the City of Leicester: Gules, a cinquefoil ermine pierced of the field

Full coat of arms with the supporters granted in 1929

The Corporation of Leicester's coat of arms was first granted to the city at the Heraldic Visitation of 1619, and is based on the arms of the first Earl of Leicester, Robert Beaumont. The charge is a cinquefoil ermine, on a red field, and this emblem is used by the city council. After Leicester became a city again in 1919, the city council applied to add to the arms. Permission for this was granted in 1929, when the supporting lions, from the Lancastrian Earls of Leicester, were added.

The motto "Semper Eadem" was the motto of Queen Elizabeth I, who granted a royal charter to the city. It means "always the same" but with positive overtones meaning unchanging, reliable or dependable, and united. The crest on top of the arms is a white or silver legless wyvern with red and white wounds showing, on a wreath of red and white. The legless wyvern distinguishes it as a Leicester wyvern as opposed to other wyverns. The supporting lions are wearing coronets in the form of collars, with the white cinquefoil hanging from them.

== Demography ==
Ethnic demography of Leicester from 1961 to 2021

Faith in Leicester (2021)
1. Christian (24.7%)
2. No Religion (23.0%)
3. Muslim (23.5%)
4. Hindu (17.9%)
5. Sikh (4.50%)
6. Buddhist (0.30%)
7. Jewish (0.10%)
8. Other Religions (0.60%)
9. Religion not Stated (5.60%)

=== Comparing ===
In the 2021 census, the population of the Leicester unitary authority area was 368,581, an increase of 11.7% compared to the United Kingdom Census 2011 figure of 329,839. The wider Leicester Urban Area, showed an estimated population of 509,000. The population of the Leicester unitary authority area is marginally higher than that of Nottingham, while Nottingham has a higher urban area population compared to Leicester. Eurostat's Larger Urban Zone lists the population of the Leicester LUZ at 886,673 (2017) below that of Nottingham; metropolitan and city region populations tend to be similar. According to the 2011 census Leicester had the largest proportion of people aged 19-and-under in the East Midlands at 27 per cent. Coventry, to the south west, has a population of 352,900 (2016 est.) compared to Leicester's 348,300 at the same date. Nonetheless, Coventry has an area one third greater than Leicester's, approximately equivalent to a combined 'Leicester + Oadby and Wigston' with a respective population of 404,100 (2016 est.).

The Eurostat regional yearbook 2015 classifies Leicester as one of country's eleven 'Greater Cities', together with Birmingham and Nottingham in the Midlands. Leicester is second only to Bristol as the largest unitary authority city in England (List of English districts by population 2015 estimates), and ninth largest counting both unitary authority cities and cities within metropolitan counties.

In terms of ethnic composition, according to the 2021 census, 40.9% of the population was White (33.2% White British, 0.5% White Irish, 0.1% Gypsy or Irish Traveller, 6.8% Other White), 43.4% Asian (34.3% Indian, 3.4% Pakistani, 1.9% Bangladeshi, 0.7% Chinese, 3.1% Other Asian), 3.8% of mixed race (1.4% White and Black Caribbean, 0.5% White and Black African, 1.0% White and Asian, 0.8% Other Mixed), 7.8% Black (5.8% African, 1.4% Caribbean, 0.8% Other Black), 0.9% Arab and 3.2% of other ethnic heritage.

As of 2015, Leicester is the second fastest growing city in the country.

=== Languages ===
A demographic profile of Leicester published by the city council in 2008 noted:

Alongside English, around 70 languages and/or dialects spoken in the city. In addition to English and the primary western and central European languages, eight ethnic languages are sometimes heard: Gujarati is the preferred language of 16% of the city's residents, Punjabi 3%, Somali 4% and Urdu 2%. Other smaller language groups include Hindi and Bengali. With continuing migration into the city, new languages and or dialects from Africa, the Middle East and Eastern Europe are also being spoken in the city. In certain primary schools in Leicester, English may not be the preferred language of 45% of pupils and the proportion of children whose first language is known, or believed to be, other than English, is significantly higher than other cities in the Midlands or the UK as a whole.

Certain European languages such as Polish will undoubtedly feature in current statistics, although their prevalence may reduce subsequently as future generations rapidly assimilate or return to places of origin, given cultural and geographic proximity and changes in the geo-political environment.

=== Population change ===
Historic and projected Population growth in Leicester since 1901
Year	1901	1911	1921	1931	1939	1951	1961	1971	2001	2011	2016	2021	2026	2031
Population	211,579	227,222	234,143	239,169	261,339	285,181	273,470	284,208	279,921	329,839	348,343	362,500	376,000	390,000
Source: A Vision of Britain through Time											ONS	ONS Projections		

The ONS 2014 basis population projections indicate the city will be home to 400,000 inhabitants by around 2035.

== Economy ==
Leicester has the second largest economy in the East Midlands, after Nottingham.

Companies that have their principal offices or significant sites in Leicester and the surrounding area include; Brantano Footwear, Dunelm Mill, Next, Shoe Zone, Everards brewing and associated businesses, KPMG, Mazars, Cambridge & Counties Bank, HSBC and Santander banking, Hastings Insurance, British Gas, British Telecom, Caterpillar (Inc.), Topps Tiles and DHL.

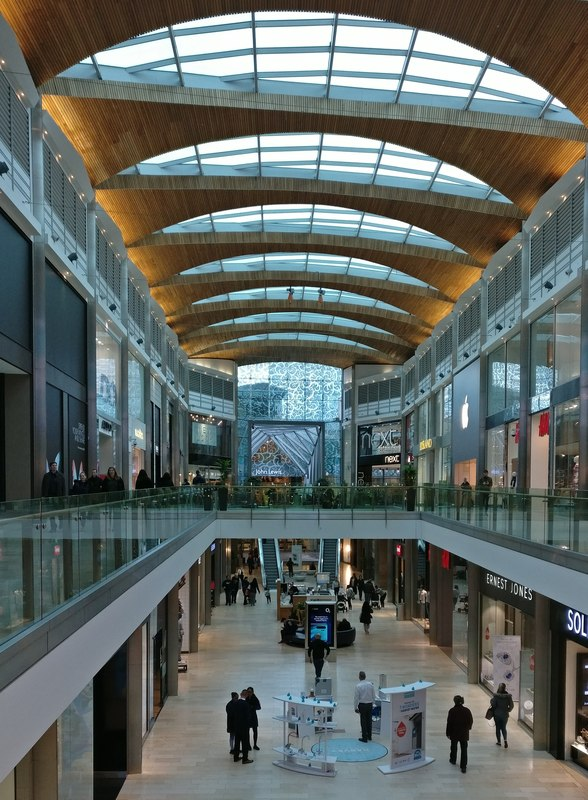
Highcross Leicester shopping centre

The city of Leicester is regularly rated as the best place to live and work in the East Midlands. The Good Growth for Cities Index is an annual study which ranks UK cities based on a range of economic factors. In 2022, the Index placed Leicester 14th out of 50 UK cities and the best performing city in the East Midlands. In 2023, the index ranked Leicester first of seven East Midlands cities, and 16th overall across the country. In 2024, the Good Growth for Cities Index again rated Leicester as the best performing city in the East Midlands, and 20th overall out of 52 other UK cities.

=== Tourism ===
The city of Leicester is considered to be one of the birthplaces of popular tourism. Visit Leicester, who are based at the King Richard III Visitor Centre, define the city as 'The Place Where Tourism Began.'

=== Retail ===
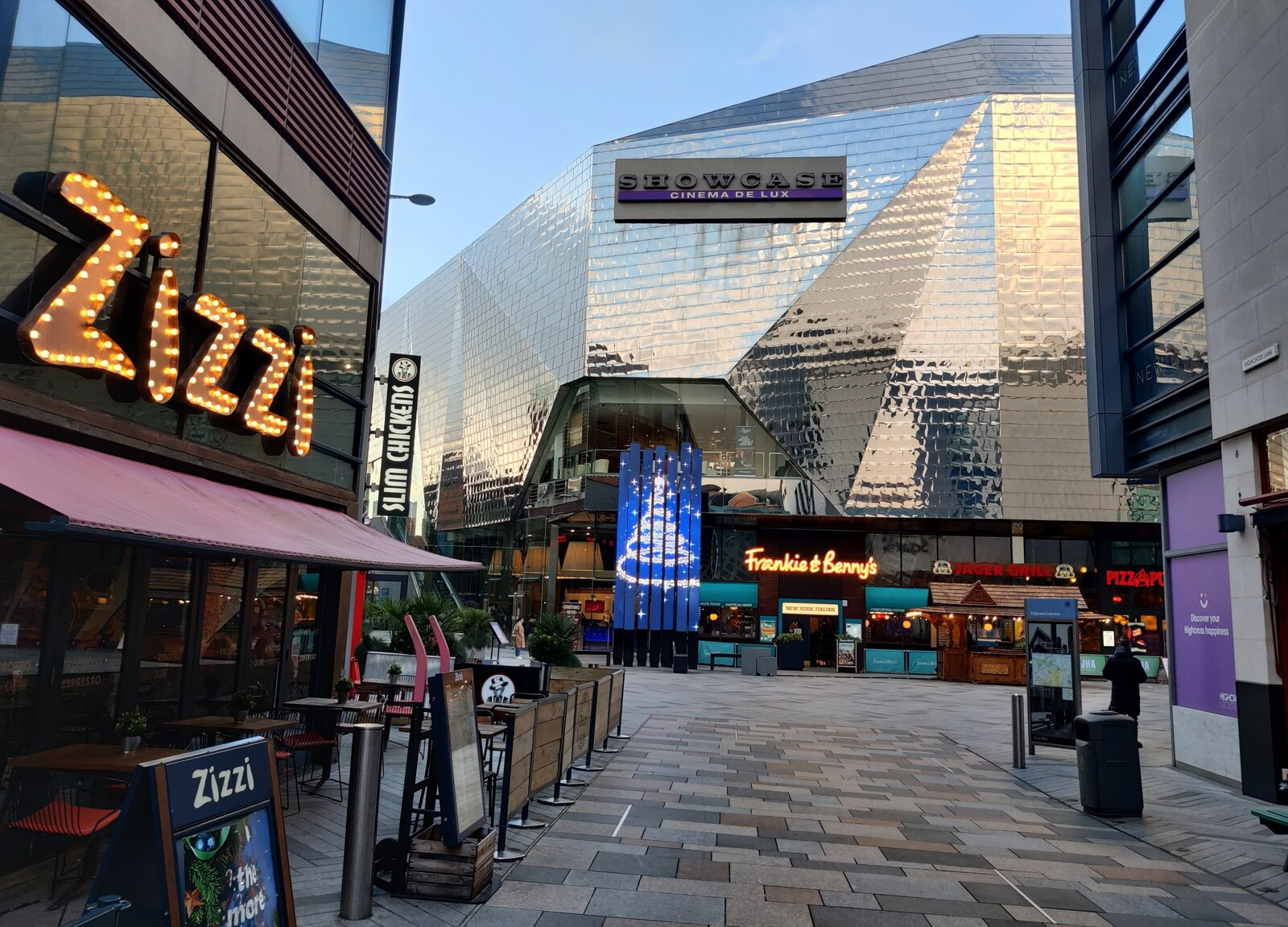
A further image of Highcross in Leicester

The city centre has two large shopping malls – Highcross Leicester and the Haymarket Shopping Centre. The Haymarket Shopping Centre opened in 1974 and has two levels of shopping, multi-storey parking for up to 500 cars, a bus station and is home to the Haymarket Theatre. Highcross Leicester opened in 2008 after work to redevelop "The Shires Centre" was completed at a cost of £350 million (creating 120 stores, 15 restaurants, a cinema, 110,000 m^{2} of shopping space).

St Martin's Square and the Leicester Lanes area has numerous designer and specialist shops; several of the city's Victorian arcades are located in the same neighbourhood. Leicester Market is the largest outdoor covered market in Europe. It central feature, the Leicester Corn Exchange, has been converted into a public house.

Central Leicester is the location for several department stores such as John Lewis.

The Golden Mile is the name given to a stretch of Belgrave Road renowned for its authentic Indian restaurants, sari shops, and jewellers; the Diwali celebrations in Leicester are focused on this area and are the largest outside the sub-continent.

=== Textiles ===
The city has historically had a strong association with the production of textiles, clothing and footwear. While important companies such as Corah, Liberty Shoes and Equity Shoes have closed, companies such as Next and Boden are still active and ASOS and New Look manufacture in the city. Moreover, in recent years the higher transport prices and longer lead-times associated with globalised production in Asia has led some textile manufacturers to locate to the city.

There have long been concerns about the working conditions in this sector. Leicester's garment district is home to more than 1,000 factories employing as many as 10,000 workers. It has received fewer than 60 health and safety inspections and only 28 fire inspections since October 2017. HMRC has made just 36 visits checking on compliance with minimum wage legislation; it has issued penalties to fewer than 10 textile firms and claimed just over £100,000 in arrears relating to 143 workers. Research at the University of Leicester in 2010 and published in 2015 found there were 11,700 employees in the East Midlands garment industry. 75-90% of them were being paid £3 per hour, which was less than half of the then legal minimum wage. In 2017 Peter Soulsby, Mayor of Leicester called together 40 regulatory organisations to coordinate a response. He aimed to make sure that Leicester had the highest standards of employment; that workers are properly paid, well trained and work in safe environments, In 2020 the HSE was alerted to COVID-19 non-compliance, made inspections and gave advice.

=== Engineering ===
Engineering companies include Jones & Shipman (machine tools and control systems), Richards Engineering (foundry equipment), Transmon Engineering (materials handling equipment) and Trelleborg (suspension components for rail, marine, and industrial applications). Local commitment to nurturing British engineers includes apprenticeship schemes with local companies, and academic-industrial connections with the engineering departments at Leicester University, De Montfort University, and nearby Loughborough University. Leicester was also home to the famous Gents' of Leicester clock manufacturers.

=== Food and drink ===
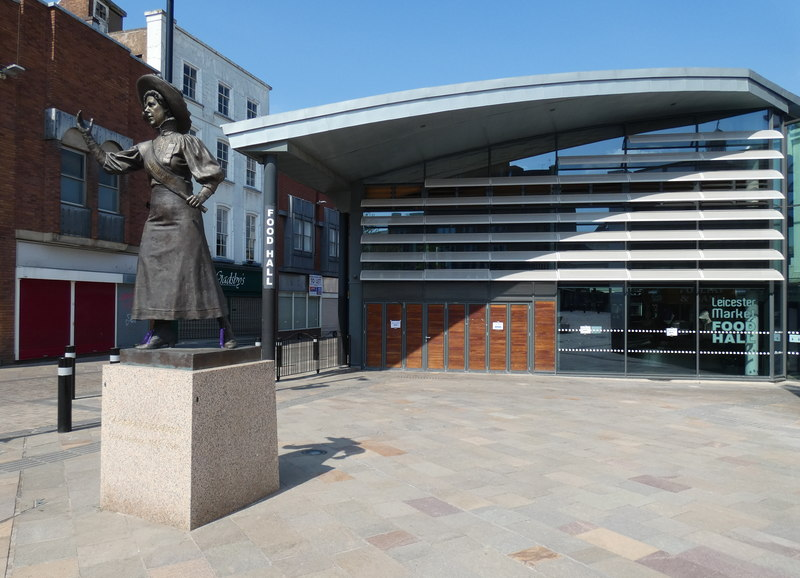
Leicester Market and food hall

Henry Walker was a successful pork butcher who moved from Mansfield to Leicester in the 1880s to take over an established business in High Street. The first Walker's crisp production line was in the empty upper storey of Walker's Oxford Street factory in Leicester. In the early days the potatoes were sliced by hand and cooked in an ordinary deep fryer. In 1971 the Walker's crisps business was sold to Standard Brands, an American firm, who sold on the company to Frito-Lay. Walker's crisps makes 10 million bags of crisps per day at two factories in Beaumont Leys, and is the UK's largest grocery brand. The Beaumont Leys manufacturing plant is world's largest crisp factory.

Meanwhile, the sausage and pie business was bought out by Samworth Brothers in 1986. Production outgrew the Cobden Street site and pork pies are now manufactured at a meat processing factory and bakery in Beaumont Leys, coincidentally near to the separately owned crisp factories. Sold under the Walker's name and under UK retailers own brands such as Tesco, over three million hot and cold pies are made each week. Henry Walker's butcher shop at 4–6 Cheapside sold Walker's sausages and pork pies until March 2012 when owner Scottish Fife Fine Foods ceased trading, although the shop was temporarily open and selling Walker's pies for the Christmas season of 2012.

== Landmarks ==
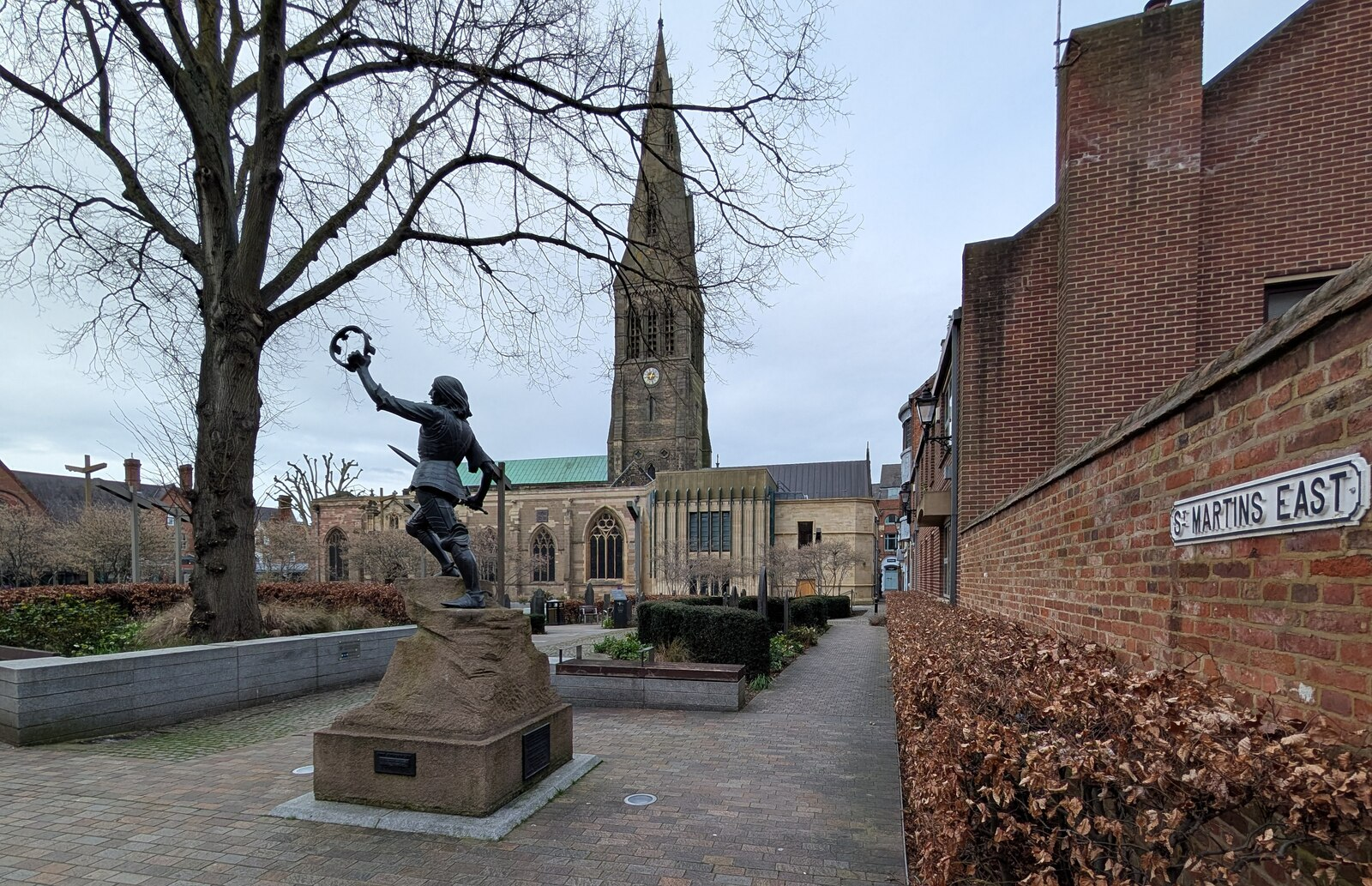
Leicester Cathedral

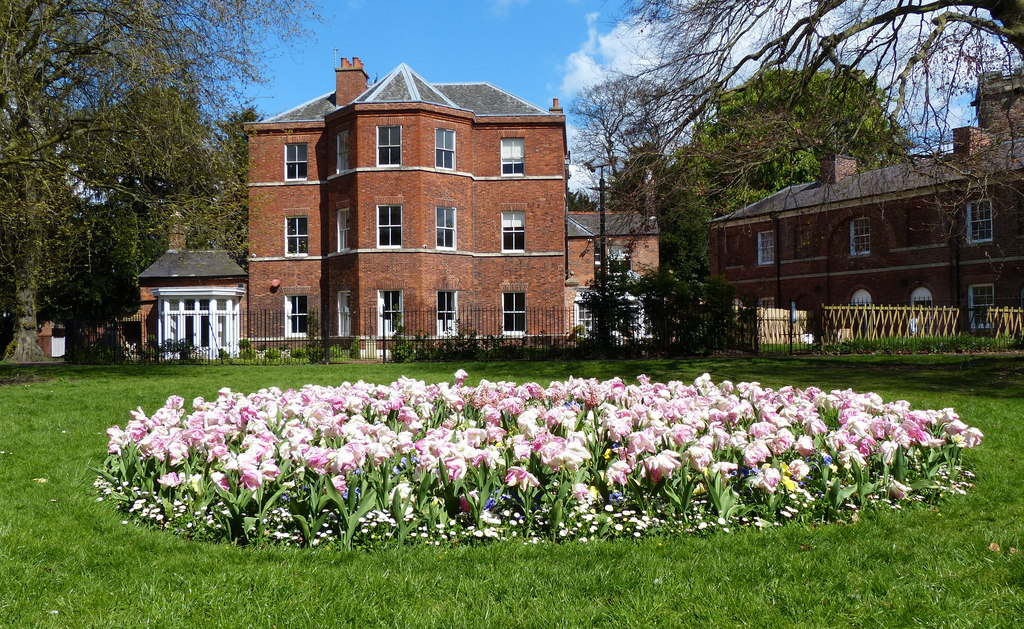
Belgrave Hall, in Leicester.

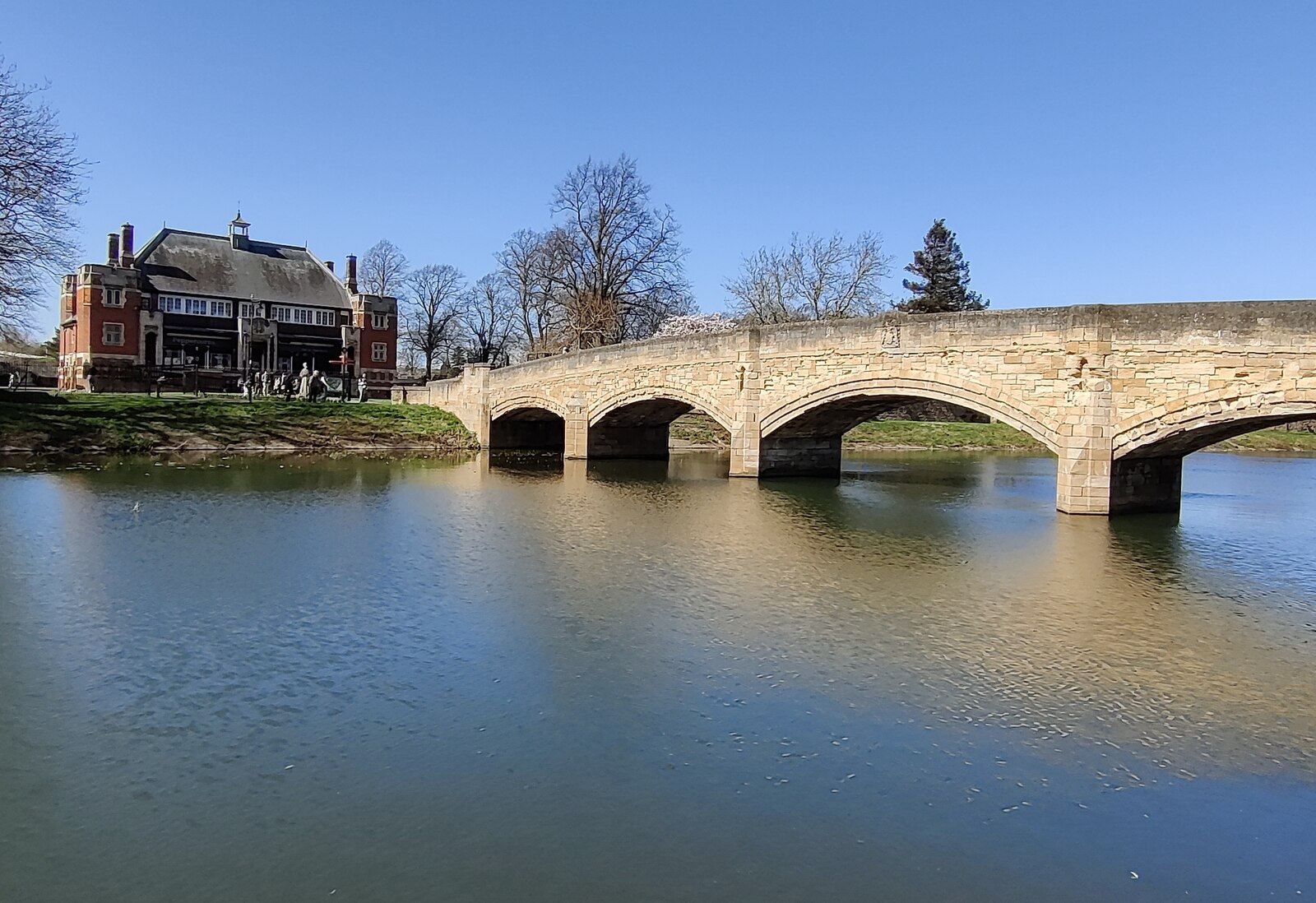
The River Soar passing the pavilion in Abbey Park

There are 10 scheduled monuments in Leicester, 13 Grade I listed buildings, and 35 Grade II* listed buildings. Some sites, such as Leicester Castle and the Jewry Wall, are both scheduled monuments and listed buildings.

20th-century architecture: Leicester University Engineering Building (James Stirling & James Gowan : Grd II Listed), Kingstone Department Store, Belgrave Gate (Raymond McGrath : Grd II Listed), National Space Centre tower.

Older architecture:

Historic buildings: Jewry Wall, the Castle, Newarke Magazine Gateway, St Nicholas Church, St Margaret's Church, St Mary de Castro, All Saints, the Cathedral, the Abbey, the Guildhall, the Town Hall, Belgrave Hall, The City Rooms, the Clock Tower, the Secular Hall.

Parks: Abbey Park, Botanic Gardens, Castle Gardens, Grand Union Canal, Knighton Park, Nelson Mandela Park, River Soar, Victoria Park, Watermead Country Park.

Industry: Abbey Pumping Station, National Space Centre, Great Central Railway.

Shopping: Abbey Lane-grandes surfaces, Beaumont Shopping Centre, Belvoir Street/Market Street, Golden Mile, Haymarket Shopping Centre, Highcross, Leicester Lanes, Leicester Market, St Martin's Square, Silver Arcade area.

Sport: King Power Stadium – Leicester City FC, Welford Road – Leicester Tigers, Grace Road – Leicestershire County Cricket Club, Paul Chapman & Sons Arena, Leicester Lions Speedway, Leicester Sports Arena – Leicester Riders, Saffron Lane sports centre – Leicester Coritanian Athletics Club.

== Transport ==
=== Air ===
East Midlands Airport (EMA), at Castle Donington 20 miles (32 km) north-north-west of the city, is the closest international airport. The airport is a national hub for mail/freight networks.

Leicester Airport (LRC) is a small airport, some 6 miles (9.7 km) east of Leicester city centre; it does not operate scheduled services.

=== Road ===
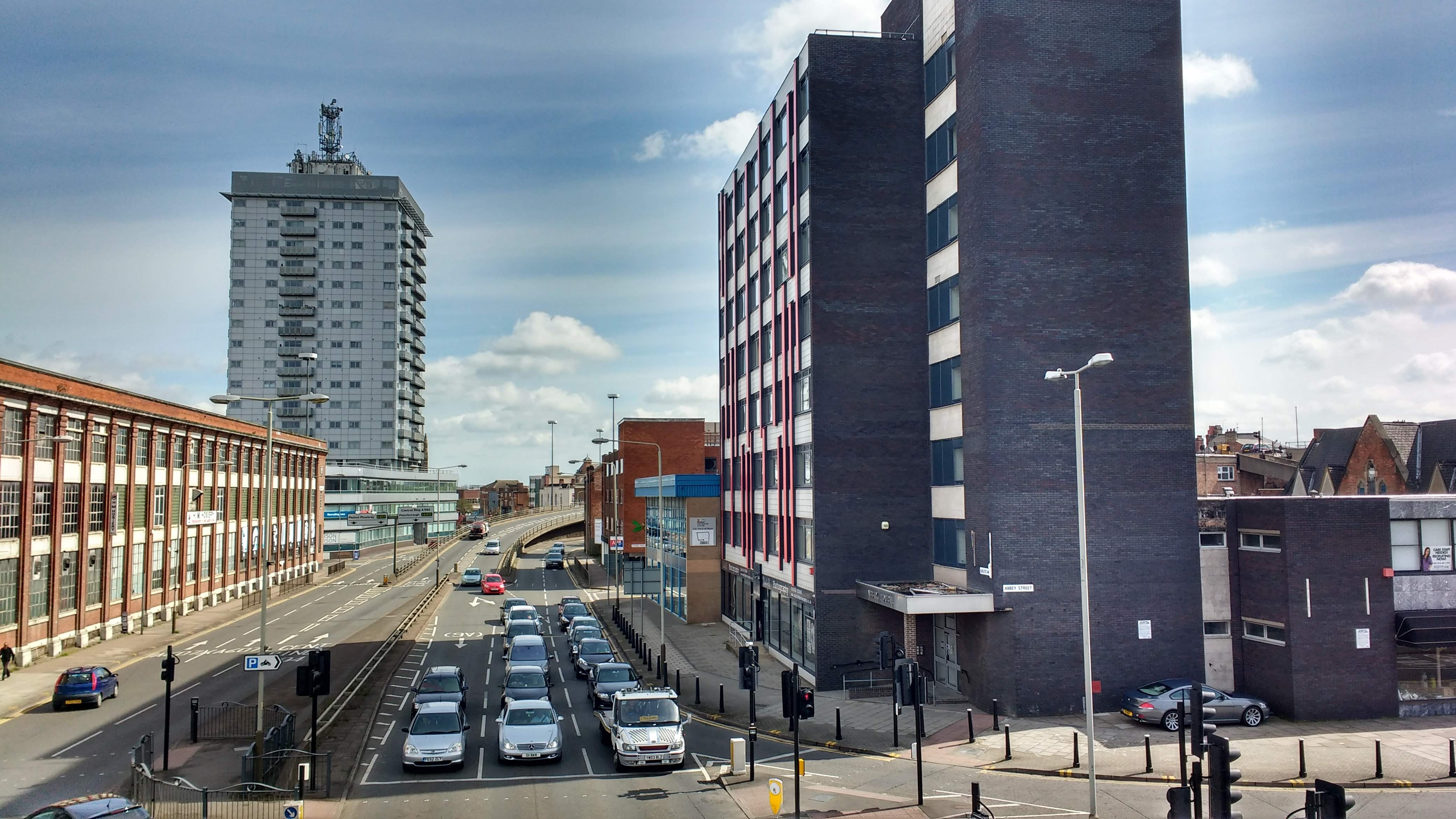
Burleys Way, Leicester, England

Leicester is at the midpoint of the primary English north/south M1 motorway between London and Leeds, served by junctions 21, 21A and 22. This is where the M1 transects with one of the primary north-east to south-west routes, the M69 motorway/A46 corridor linking to the A1 and M6 motorway at Newark-on-Trent and Coventry respectively. The M42 motorway towards Birmingham Airport terminates in north-west Leicestershire, some 12 miles (19 km) west-north-west of the Leicester urban area. Leicester is at the nexus of the A6/(A14), A50, A47 and A607 trunk roads and A426 and A5199 primary routes.

=== Buses ===
Leicester has two main bus stations: St. Margarets and Haymarket, which was recommissioned in May 2016. The main bus operators for Leicester and the surrounding area are Arriva Fox County, Centrebus, First Leicester, Hinckley Bus (Part of Arriva Midlands), Kinchbus, Leicester Bus and Stagecoach Midlands.

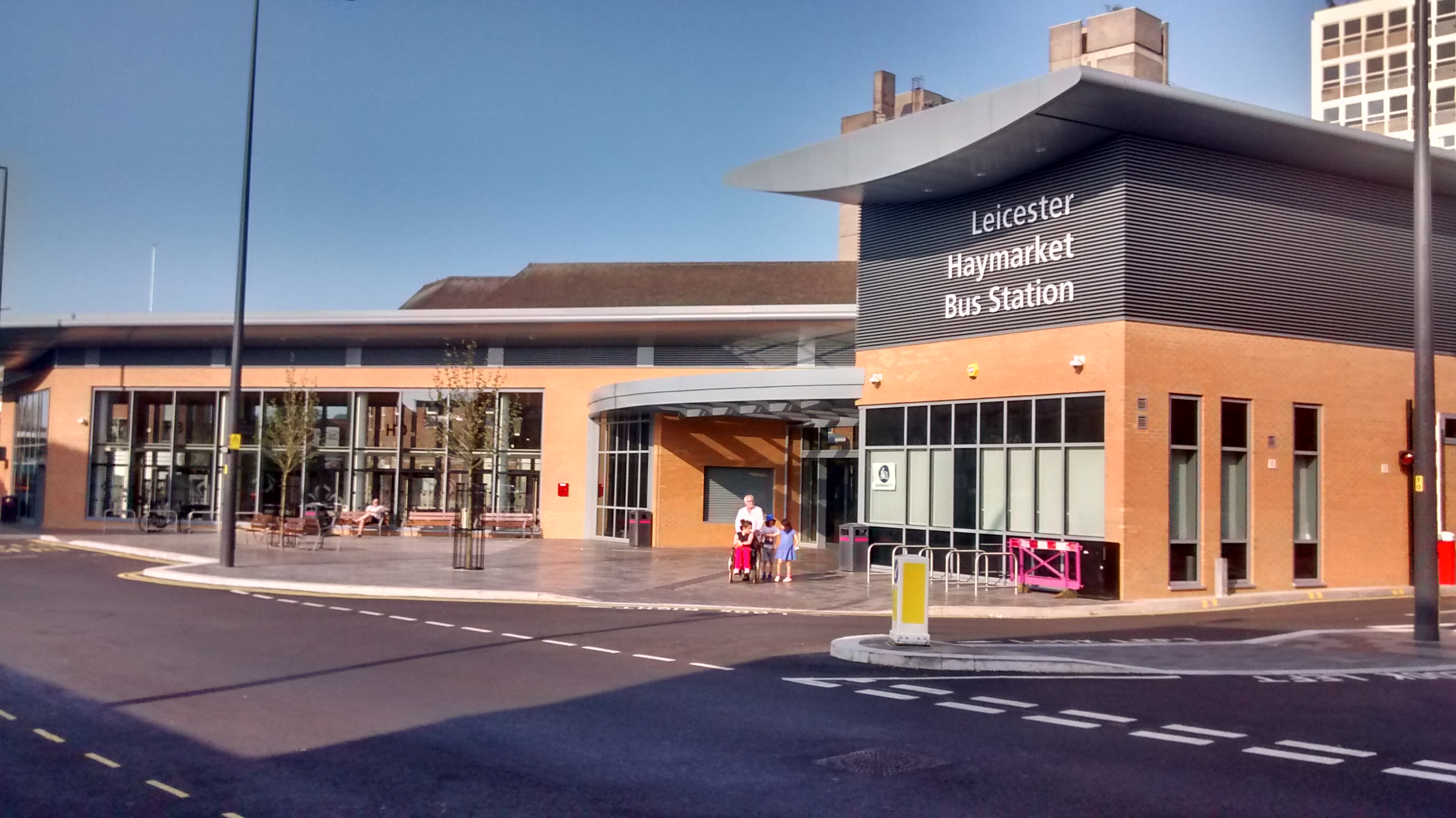
Haymarket

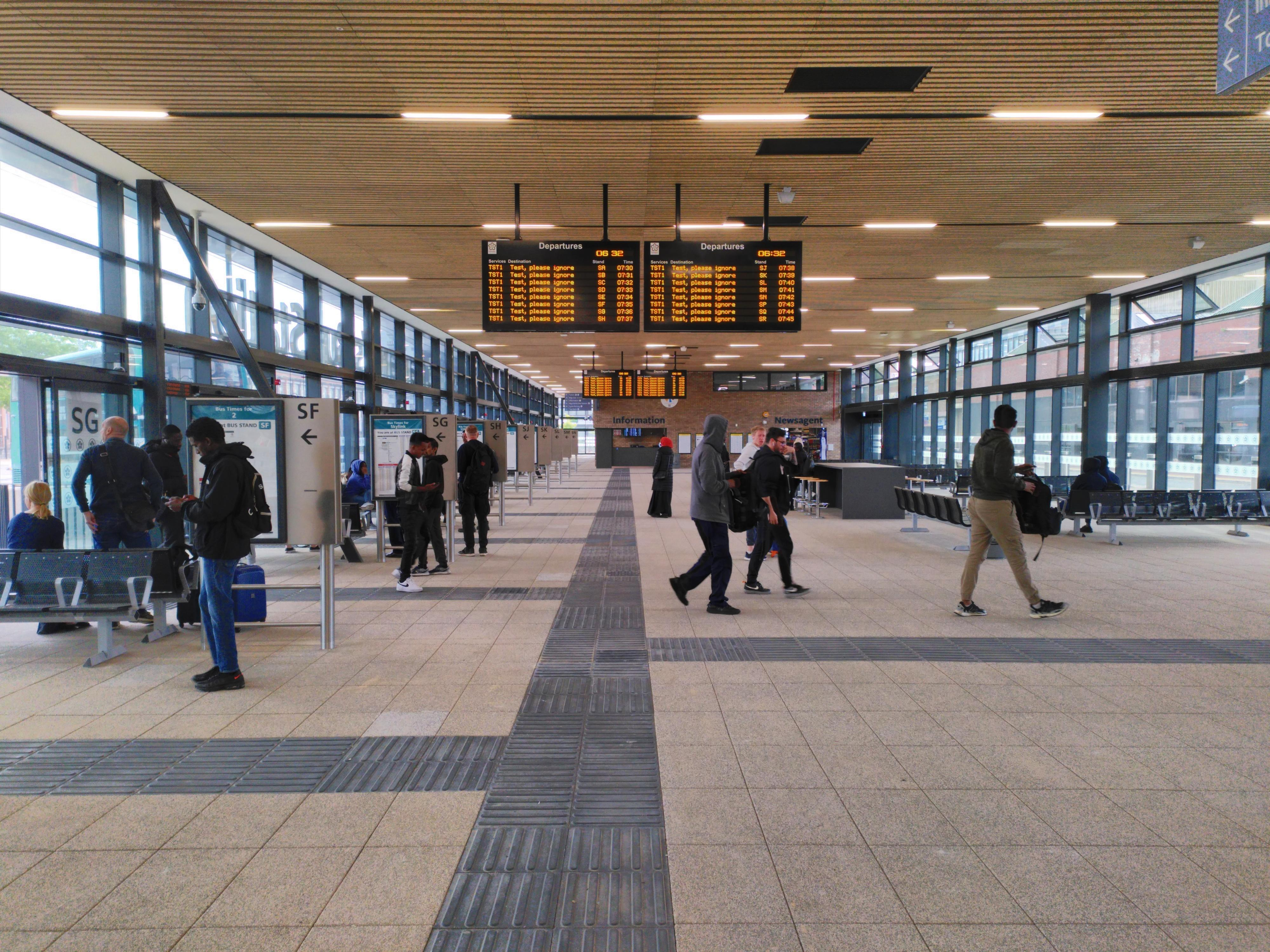
St Margaret's

The Star trak real time system was introduced in 2000 by Leicester City Council; it allowed bus tracking and the retrieval of bus times by text message or online. The system was discontinued in 2011.

There are three permanent Park and Ride sites at Meynells Gorse (Leicester Forest East), Birstall and Enderby; buses operate every 15 mins from all sites. The park and ride services are branded as quicksilver shuttle and are contracted to Roberts' Coaches from the City Council and County Council; buses use a purpose-built terminal near St. Nicholas Circle.

Leicester has two circular bus services: Hop! which operates anticlockwise in the city centre via the railway station and Haymarket bus station, and the larger 30-mile (48-kilometre) long Orbital which operates in both directions.

=== Cycling ===
National Cycle Network Route 6 passes through Leicestershire along with other secondary routes. The Leicester Bike Park is in Town Hall Square. Cycle Works Bike Mechanic Training Centre is in Wellington Street Adult Education Centre and former Central Lending Library.

From 2021 to 2023, the city had an electric bicycle sharing scheme, Santander Cycles Leicester. The scheme was a joint venture between Leicester City Council, the operator Ride On, Enzen Global as delivery partner and additional funding provided through sponsorship with Santander.

=== Railway ===
==== Mainline rail ====
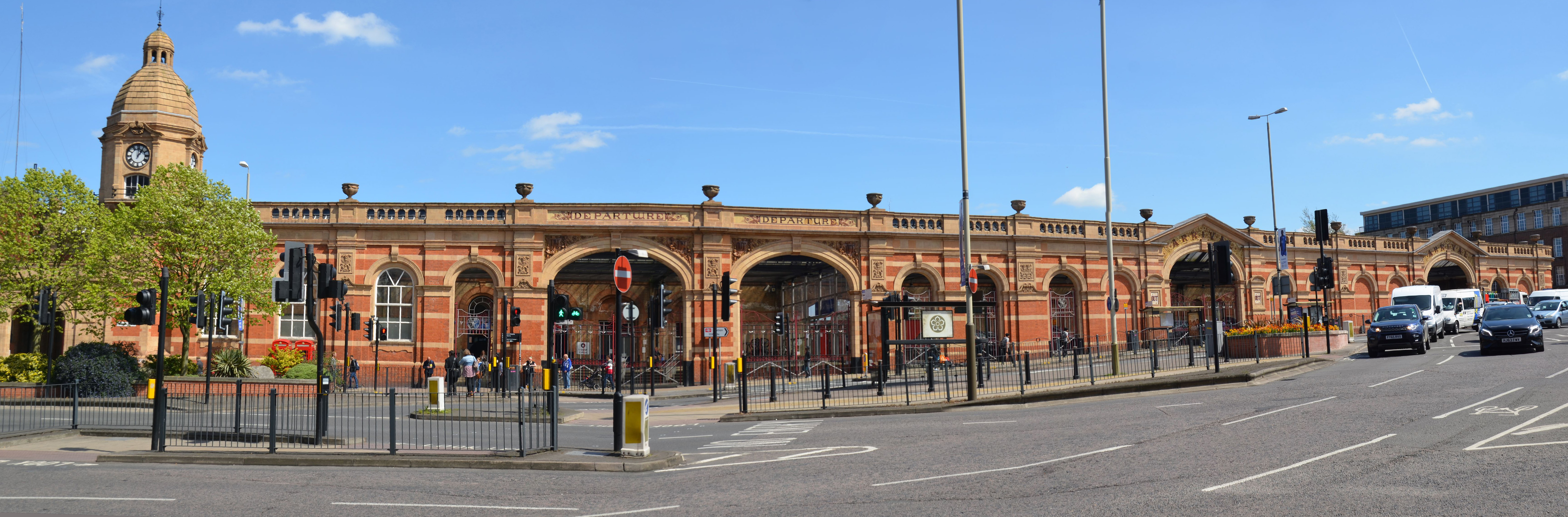
Leicester railway station lies on the eastern side of the city centre on the A6 London Road.

The rail network is of growing importance in Leicester and, with the start of Eurostar international services from London St Pancras International in November 2007, Leicester railway station has gained connections at St. Pancras station to Lille, Brussels and Paris onwards.

Inter-city services are operated by East Midlands Railway providing connectivity on 'fast' and 'semi-fast' services to London, the south-east and to major locations in the East Midlands and Yorkshire; there are also local services operating within the East Midlands region. Trans-regional services to the West Midlands and East Anglia are provided by CrossCountry, enabling connections at nearby Nuneaton, onto the West Coast Main Line, and at Peterborough to the East Coast Main Line.

The 99 miles (159 km) from Leicester Railway Station to London St Pancras International on the Midland Main Line are covered in an average of 1 hour 25 minutes during the morning peak, with journey times as low as 1 hour 6 minutes later in the day. Transfers onto London Underground or Thameslink train services to London City or West End add another 15 to 25 minutes to the journey time; double that to Canary Wharf. The journey time to Sheffield is around one hour, with Leeds and York taking approximately two. Birmingham is 50 minutes away and Cambridge, via Peterborough, can be reached in around 1 hour 55 minutes with further direct services available onto Stansted Airport in north Essex.

==== Great Central Railway ====
The decommissioned Leicester Central railway station is on the late Victorian Great Central Railway line that ran from London Marylebone northwards. Beeching cuts closed the route in the late 1960s. A preserved section, however, remains operational in the East Midlands centred on Loughborough Central railway station providing tourist services through central Leicestershire, passing Swithland Reservoir on to the Leicester North railway station terminus.

=== Waterways ===
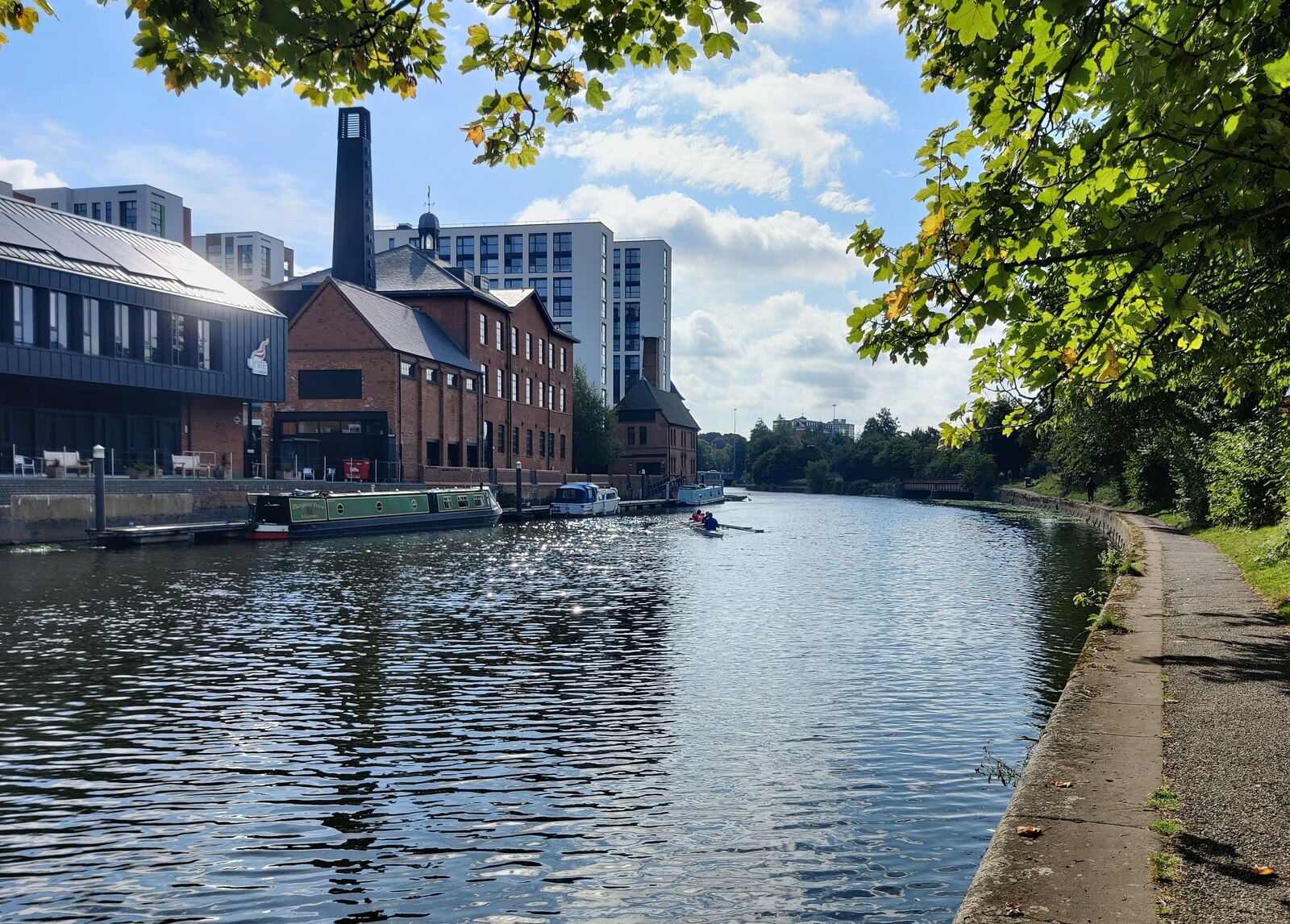
Grand Union Canal in Black Friars, Leicester

Two navigable waterways join at Leicester: The Leicester Line of the Grand Union Canal, and the River Soar Navigation. The Grand Union Canal links Leicester with London and Birmingham to the south, and joins the Soar in Leicester, which links the city to the River Trent, and the Trent and Mersey Canal to the north.

== Education ==
=== Schools ===
Leicester is home to a number of comprehensive schools and independent schools. There are three sixth form colleges, all of which were previously grammar schools.

The Leicester City Local Education Authority initially had a troubled history when formed in 1997 as part of the local government reorganisation – a 1999 Ofsted inspection found "few strengths and many weaknesses", although there has been considerable improvement since then.

Tudor Grange Samworth Academy an academy whose catchment area includes the Saffron and Eyres Monsell estates, was co-sponsored by the Church of England and David Samworth, chairman of Samworth Brothers pasty makers.

Under the "Building Schools for the Future" project, Leicester City Council has contracted with developers Miller Consortium for £315 million to rebuild Beaumont Leys School, Judgemeadow Community College, the City of Leicester College in Evington, and Soar Valley College in Rushey Mead, and to refurbish Fullhurst Community College in Braunstone.

Leicester City Council underwent a major reorganisation of children's services in 2006, creating a new Children and Young People's Services department.

=== Universities ===
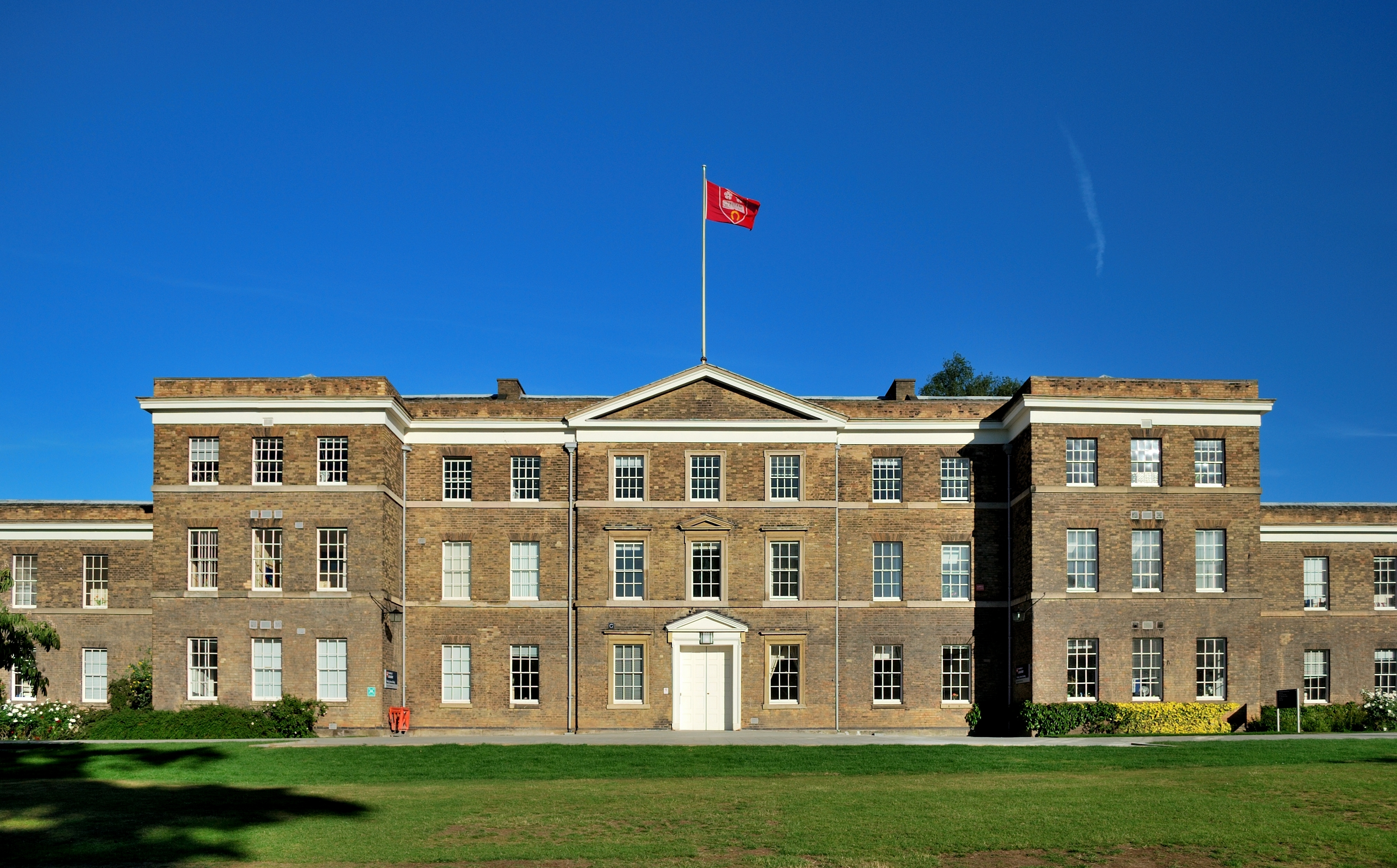
University of Leicester, Fielding Johnson Building, the main building of the university.

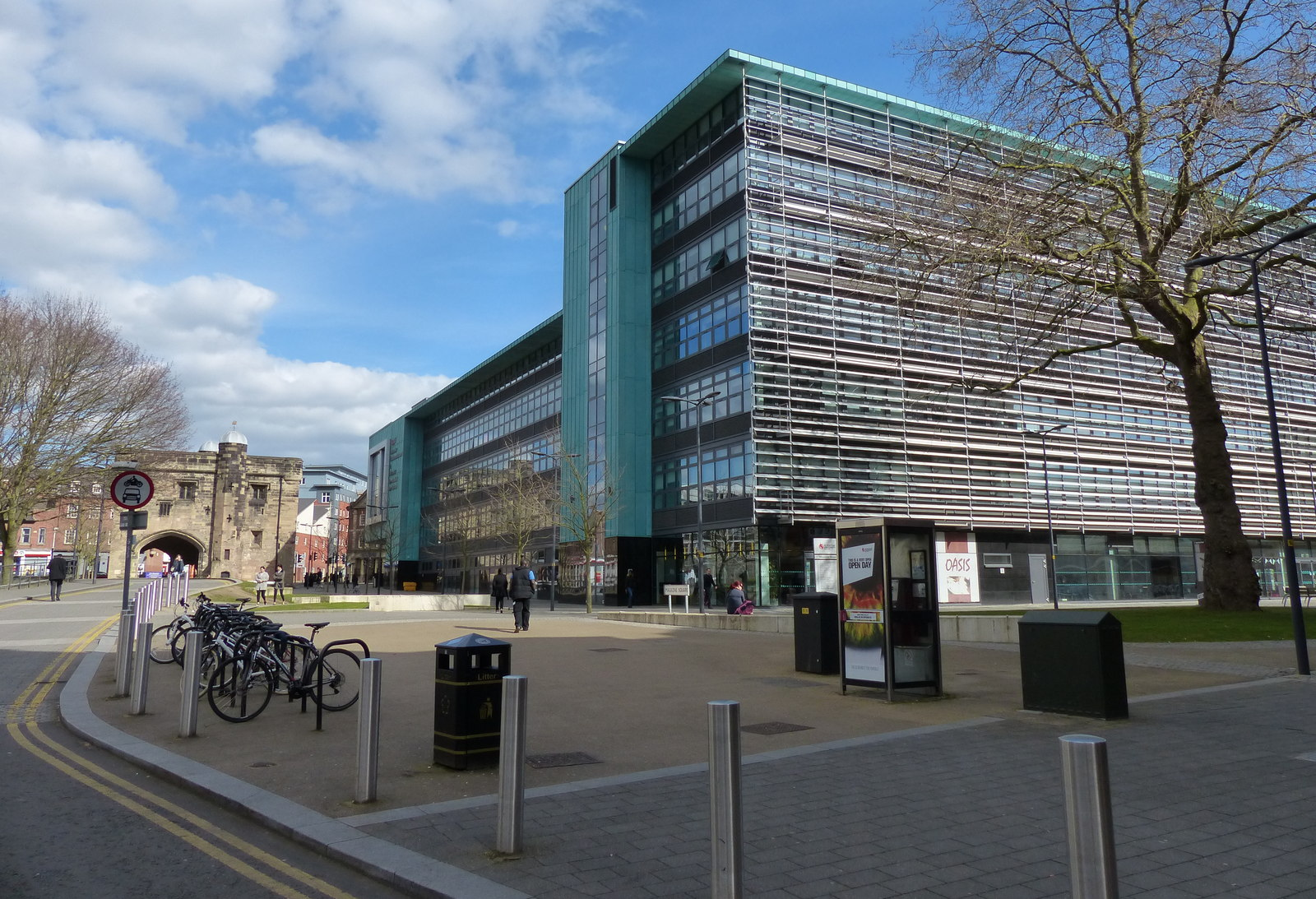
Magazine Square, with the Grade I listed Magazine Gateway and the Hugh Aston building of De Montfort University

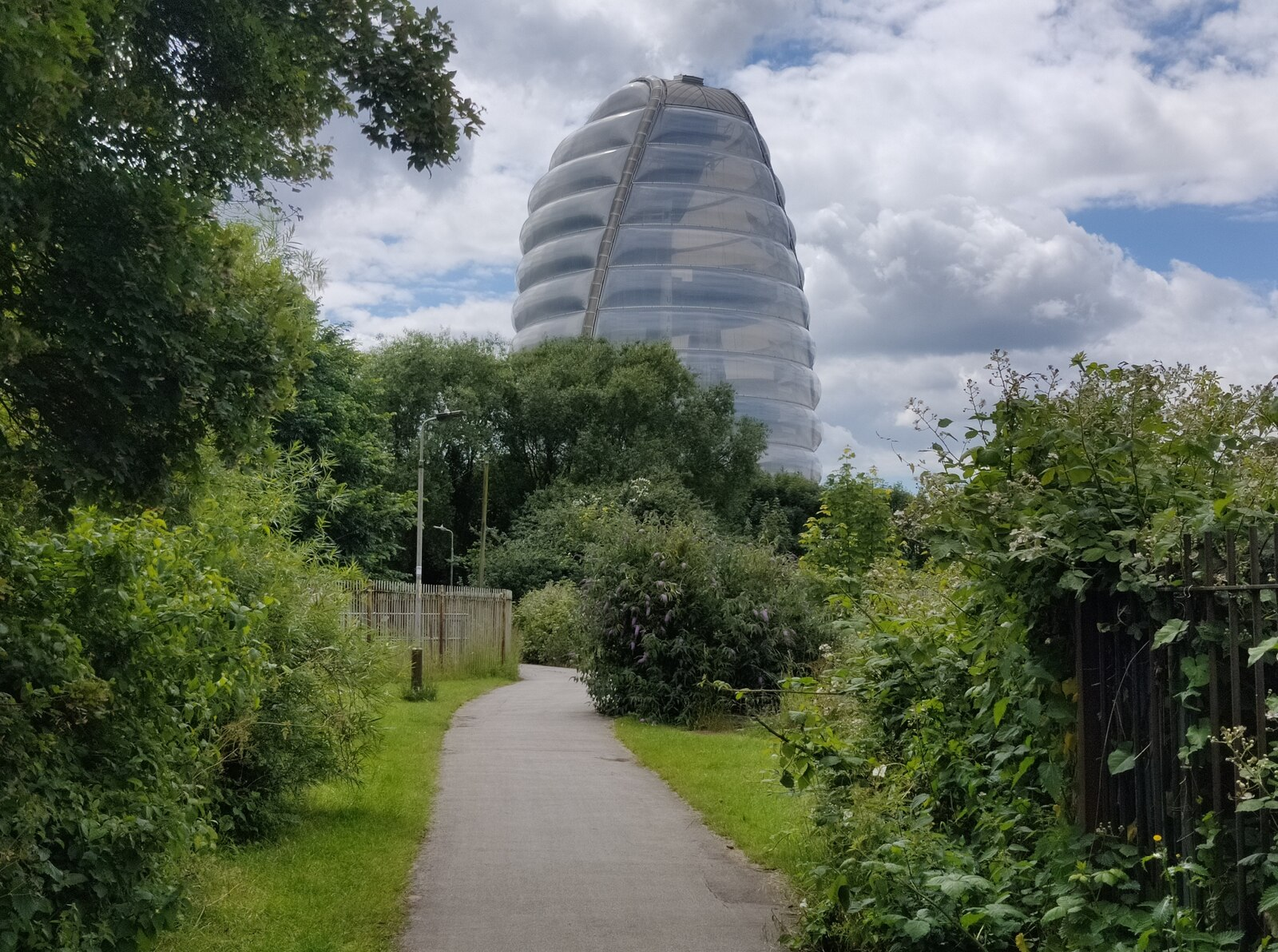
A path towards the National Space Centre

Leicester is home to two universities, the University of Leicester, which attained its Royal Charter in 1957 and was ranked 12th by the 2009 Complete University Guide, and De Montfort University, which opened in 1969 as Leicester Polytechnic and achieved university status in 1992. In 2025, the University of Leicester was named as the Daily Mail University of the Year.

It is also home to the National Space Centre off Abbey Lane, due in part to the University of Leicester being one of the few universities in the UK to specialise in space sciences.

== Religion ==
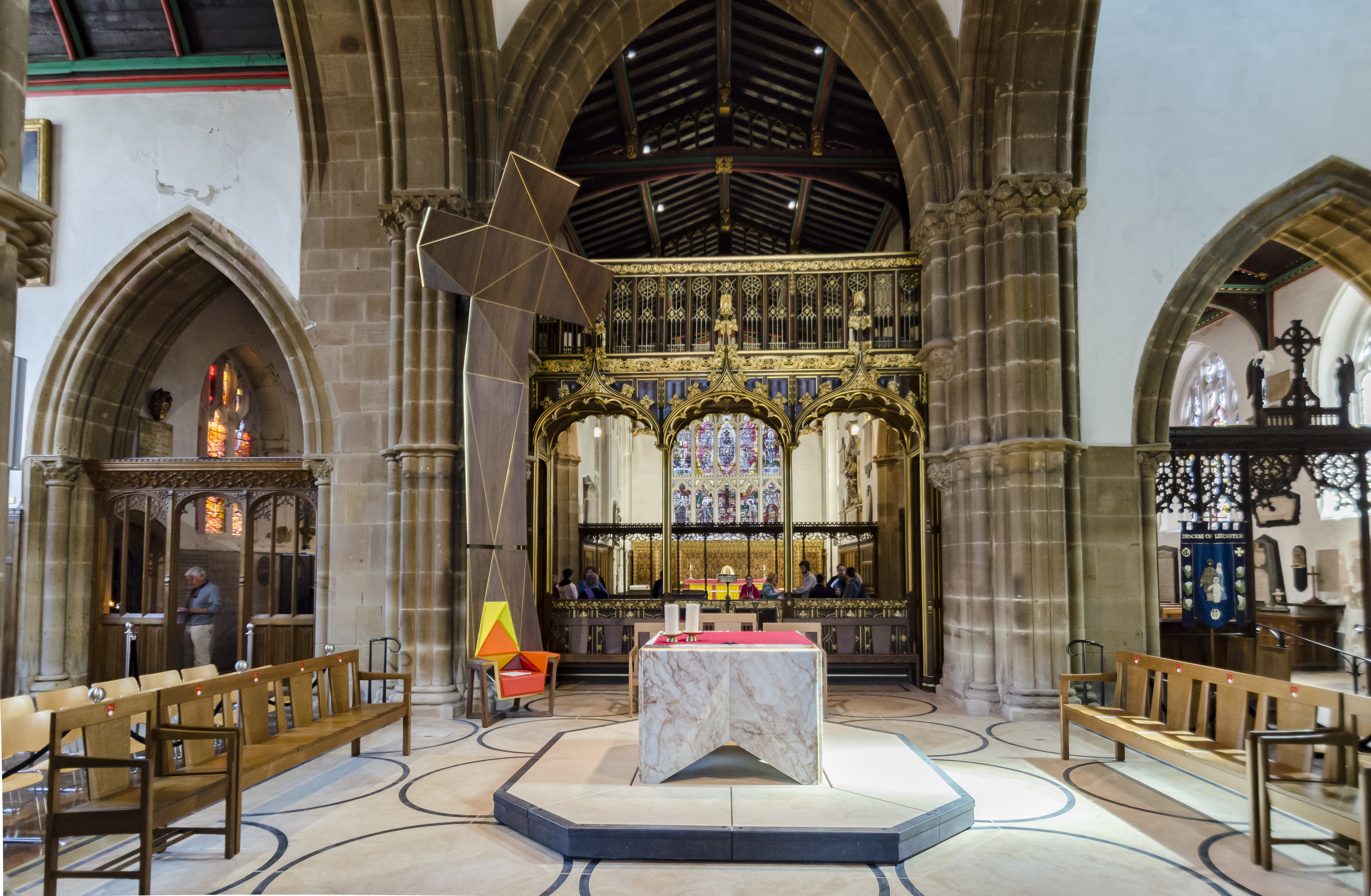
The interior of Leicester Cathedral

The Cathedral Church of Saint Martin, Leicester, usually known as Leicester Cathedral, is the Church of England cathedral and is the seat of the Bishop of Leicester. The church was elevated to a collegiate church in 1922 and made a cathedral in 1927 following the establishment of a new Diocese of Leicester in 1926.

The Church of England parish church of St Nicholas is the oldest place of worship in the city. Parts of the church certainly date from about 880 AD, and a recent architectural survey suggested possible Roman building work. The tower is Norman. By 1825 the church was in an extremely poor condition, and plans were made for its demolition. Instead, it was extensively renovated between 1875 and 1884, including the building of a new north aisle. Renovation continued into the twentieth century. A fifteenth-century octagonal font. from the redundant Church of St Michael the Greater, Stamford, was transferred to St Nicholas.

St Peter's Lane takes its name from the former medieval church of that name, which closed in the 1570s, its parish having merged with All Saints church.

From the mid 17th century Leicester became a noted centre for Protestant Nonconformity and many sects constructed places of worship in the city including the Baptists, the Congregationalists, the Quakers, the Methodists, and the Unitarians. By the 19th century the Baptist, Methodist, and Congregational presence had grown to include churches in several districts across the city and the Nonconformist conscience did much to impact the city's progressive politics. Many of these congregations are still active. In the aftermath of Catholic Emancipation in the 19th century a number of Roman Catholic churches and schools have been established in the city (see Catholic churches in Leicester).

In 2011 Christians were the largest religious group in the city at 32.4%, with Muslims next (18.6%), followed by Hindus (15.2%), Sikhs (4.4%), Buddhists (0.4%), and Jews (0.1%). In addition, 0.6% belonged to other religions, 22.8% identified with no religion and 5.6% did not respond to the question. The city is home to places of worship or gathering for all the faith groups mentioned and many of their respective sub-denominations. In the case of Judaism, for example, with only 0.1% declaring it as their faith, the city hosts two active synagogues: one Liberal and one Orthodox.

=== Places of worship ===
Places of worship include: Holy Cross Priory (Roman Catholic), Shree Jalaram Prarthana Mandal (Hindu temple), the Stake Centre of the LDS Church's Stake, four Christadelphian meeting halls, Jain Centre, Leicester Cathedral, Leicester Central Mosque, Masjid Umar (Mosque), Guru Nanak Gurdwara (Sikh), Neve Shalom Synagogue (Progressive Jewish).

== Culture ==
=== Museums ===
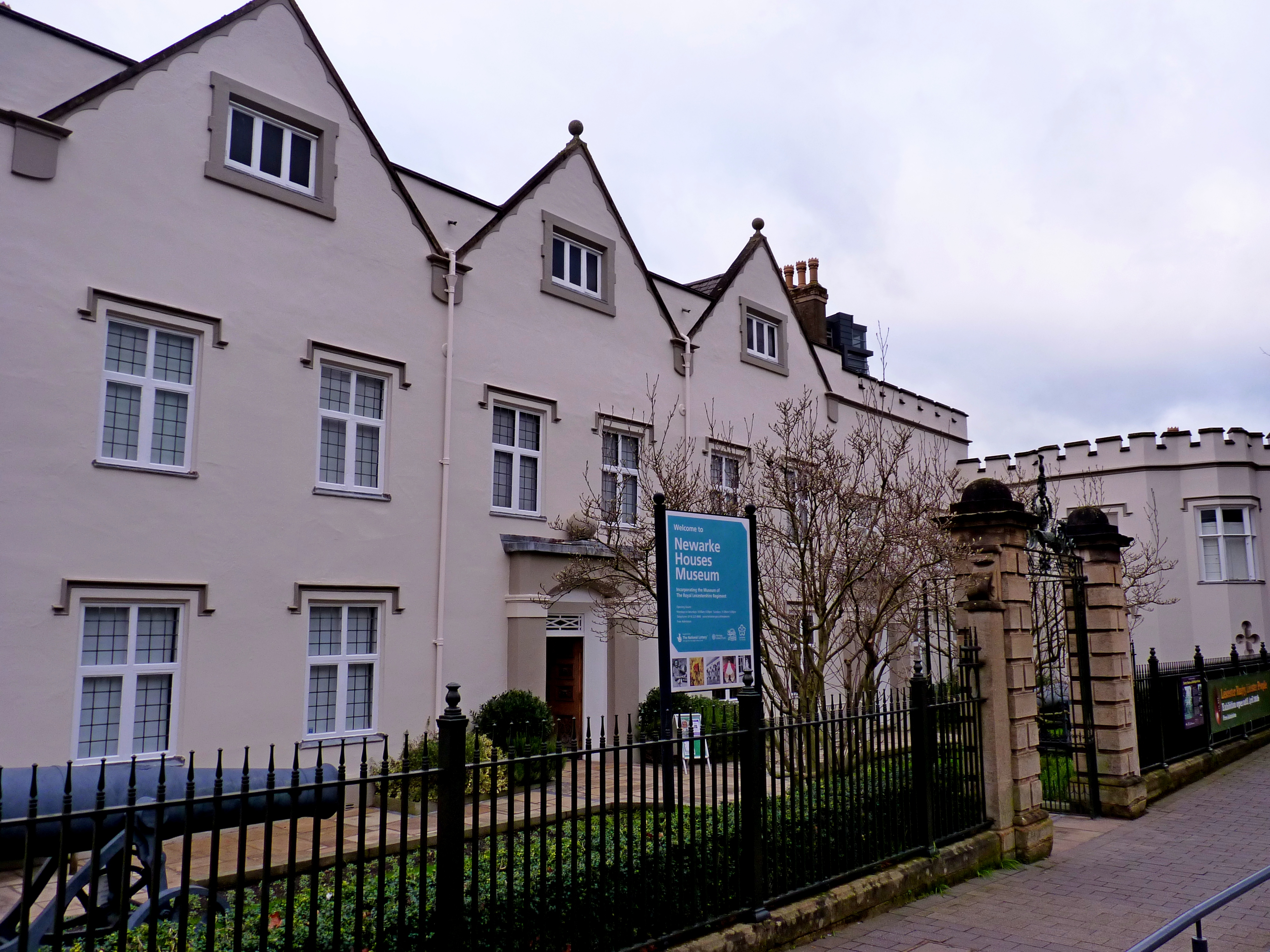
Newarke Houses Museum

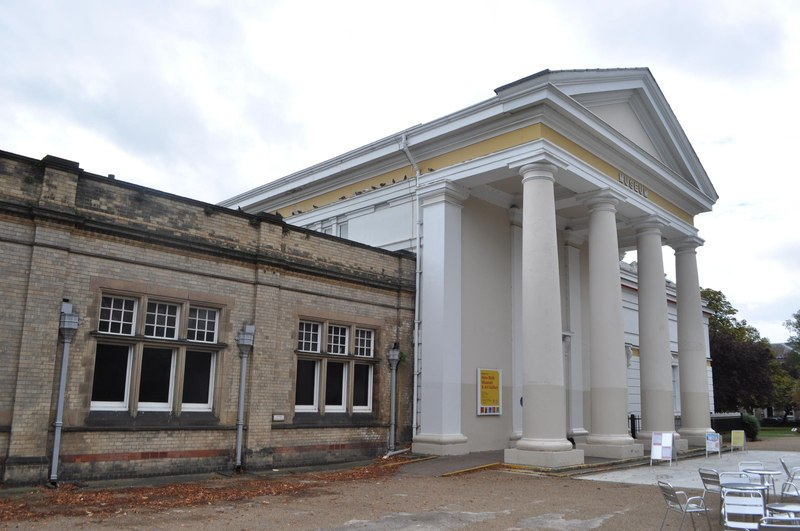
Leicester Museum & Art Gallery

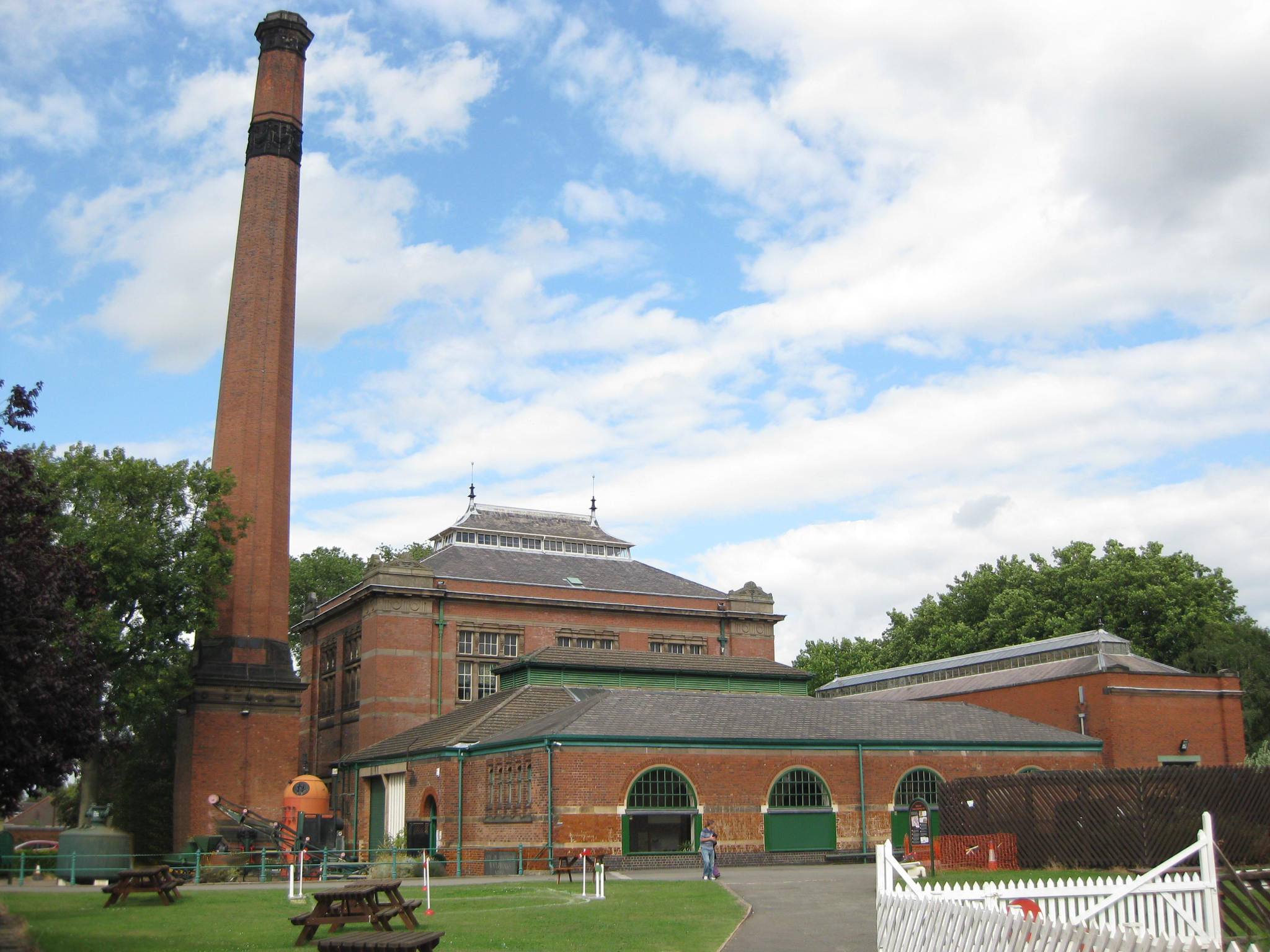
Abbey Pumping Station

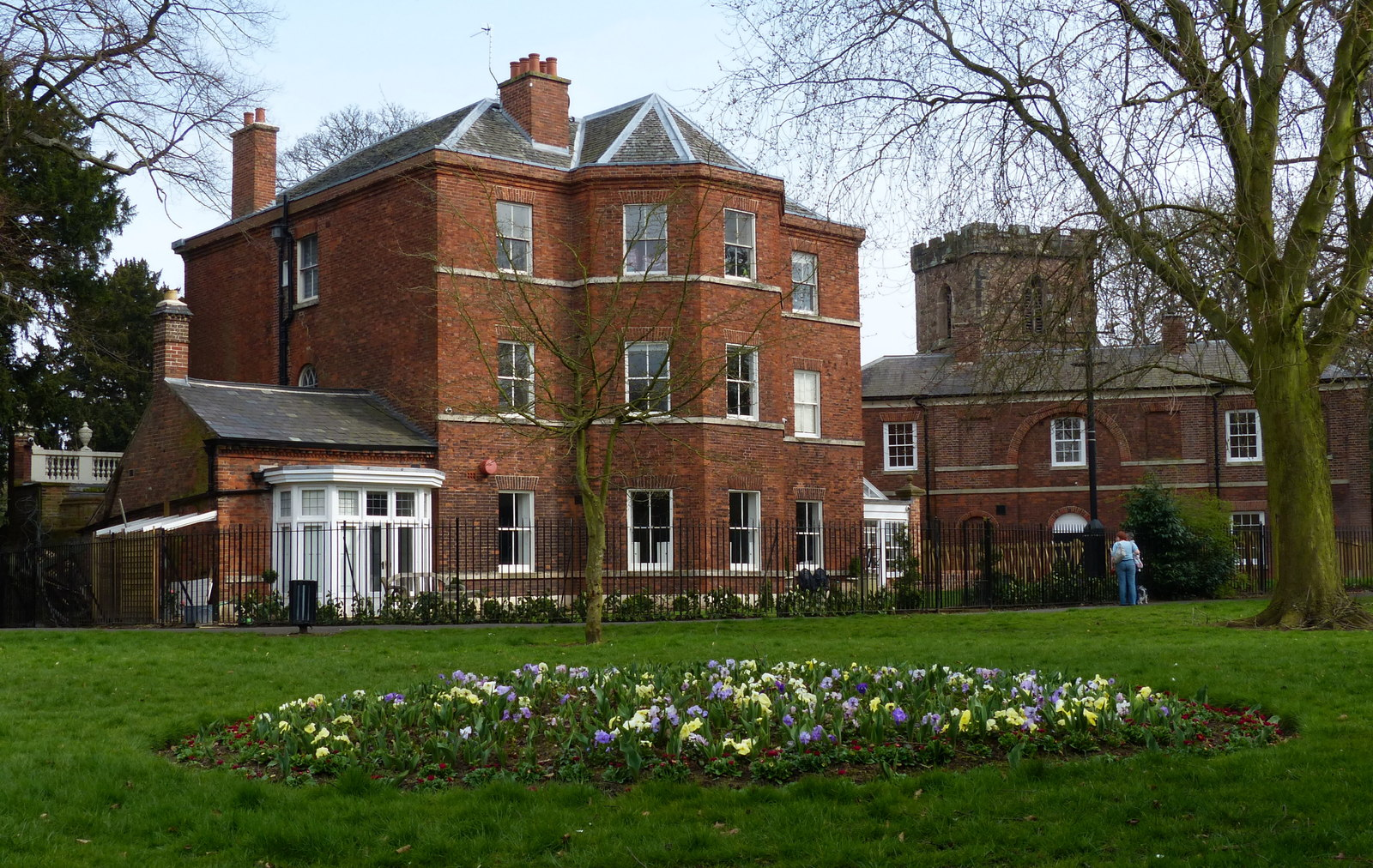
Belgrave Hall

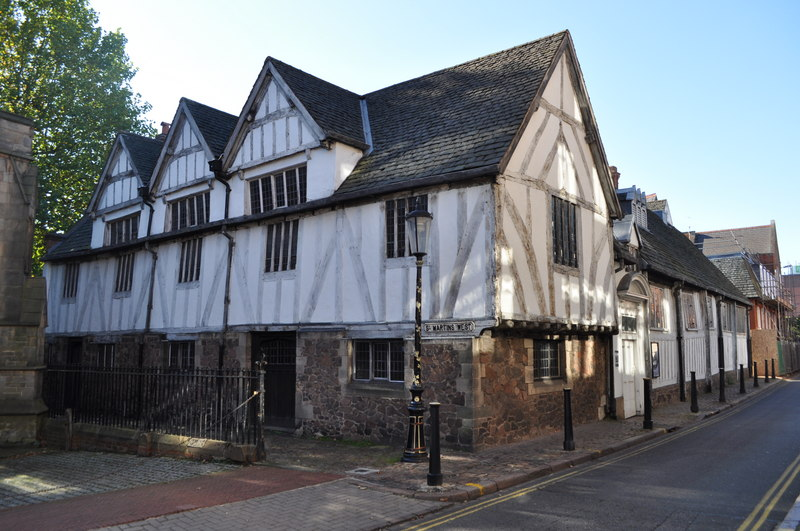
Leicester Guildhall

=== Theatre and events ===
The city hosts annually a Caribbean Carnival and parade (the largest in the UK outside London), Diwali celebrations (the largest outside of India), the largest comedy festival in the UK Leicester Comedy Festival and a Pride Parade (Leicester Pride). Belgrave Road, not far from the city centre, is colloquially known as "The Golden Mile" because of the number of Jewellers.

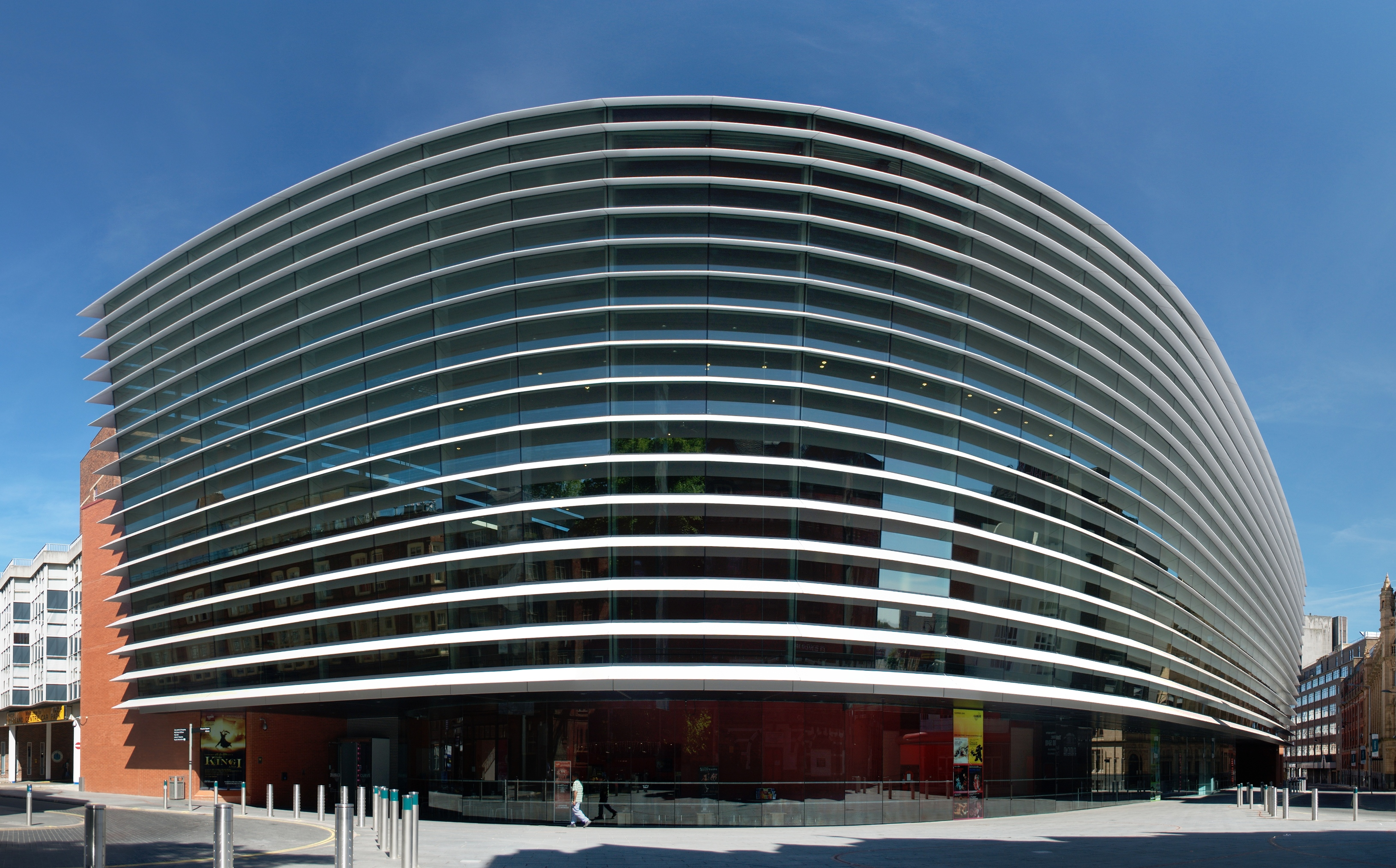
Curve Theatre

The Leicester International Short Film Festival is an annual event; it commenced in 1996 under the banner title of "Seconds Out". It has become one of the most important short film festivals in the UK and usually runs in early November, with venues including the Phoenix Cinema and Arts Centre.

Notable arts venues in the city include:

- Curve: Purpose-designed performing arts centre, designed by Rafael Viñoly, opened in Autumn 2008,
- The De Montfort Hall
- The Haymarket Theatre
- The Little Theatre
- The Y Theatre at the YMCA
- The Peepul Centre, Designed by Andrzej Blonski Architects, the £15 million building was opened in 2005 and houses an auditorium, restaurant, cyber café, gym and dance studio for the local people, as well as being used for conferences and events. The centre has even been host to former Prime Minister Gordon Brown and other senior Labour Party figures for hustings during the deputy leadership contest.
- Phoenix Cinema and Arts Centre, in Midland street opened in 2009.
- The Sue Townsend Theatre in Upper Brown Street– which opened in the former Phoenix Arts Centre.

=== In popular culture ===
Leicester is the setting for the fictional diaries of Adrian Mole, created by Sue Townsend. In the early books he lives in a suburb of Leicester and attends a local school where he first meets "the love of his life", Pandora Braithwaite.

After a period of years spent working in Oxford and London, Mole returns to Leicester and gets a job in a second-hand bookshop and a flat in an "upmarket" development on a swan-infested waterfront, which is a barely disguised representation of the area near to St. Nicholas Circle. Vastly in debt he is forced to move to the fictional village of Mangold Parva. The local (fictional) Member of Parliament (MP) for the town of Ashby de la Zouch is his old flame, Pandora Braithwaite.

Leicester is the setting for Rod Duncan's novels, the Fall of the Gas-Lit Empire series and the Riot trilogy.

Leicester and the surrounding county are settings for several Graham Joyce novels, including Dark Sister, The Limits of Enchantment and Some Kind of Fairy Tale.

The Clarendon Park and New Walk areas of the city, along with an unnamed Charnwood village ("vaguely based upon Cossington", according to the author) are some of the settings of the 2014 novel The Knot of Isis by Chrid McGordon.

Leicester is the setting for the British children book series, The Sleepover Club, by authors Rose Impey, Narinder Dhami, Lorna Read, Fiona Cummings, Louis Catt, Sue Mongredien, Angie Bates, Ginny Deals, Harriet Castor and Jana Novotny Hunter.

Notable feature films made in the city are The Girl with Brains in Her Feet (1997), Jadoo (2013) and Yamla Pagla Deewana 2 (2013).

== Sport ==
The city of Leicester has a successful record in sport. In 2016, it was named the UK's Greatest Sporting City, and in 2008, it was named as a European City of Sport.

Leicester City are a professional association football club who currently compete in the EFL League One. The club famously won the Premier League in 2016.

Leicester Tigers have been the most successful English rugby union football club since the introduction of a league in 1987, winning it a record eleven times, five more than either Bath or Wasps. They won the Premiership title most recently in 2022.

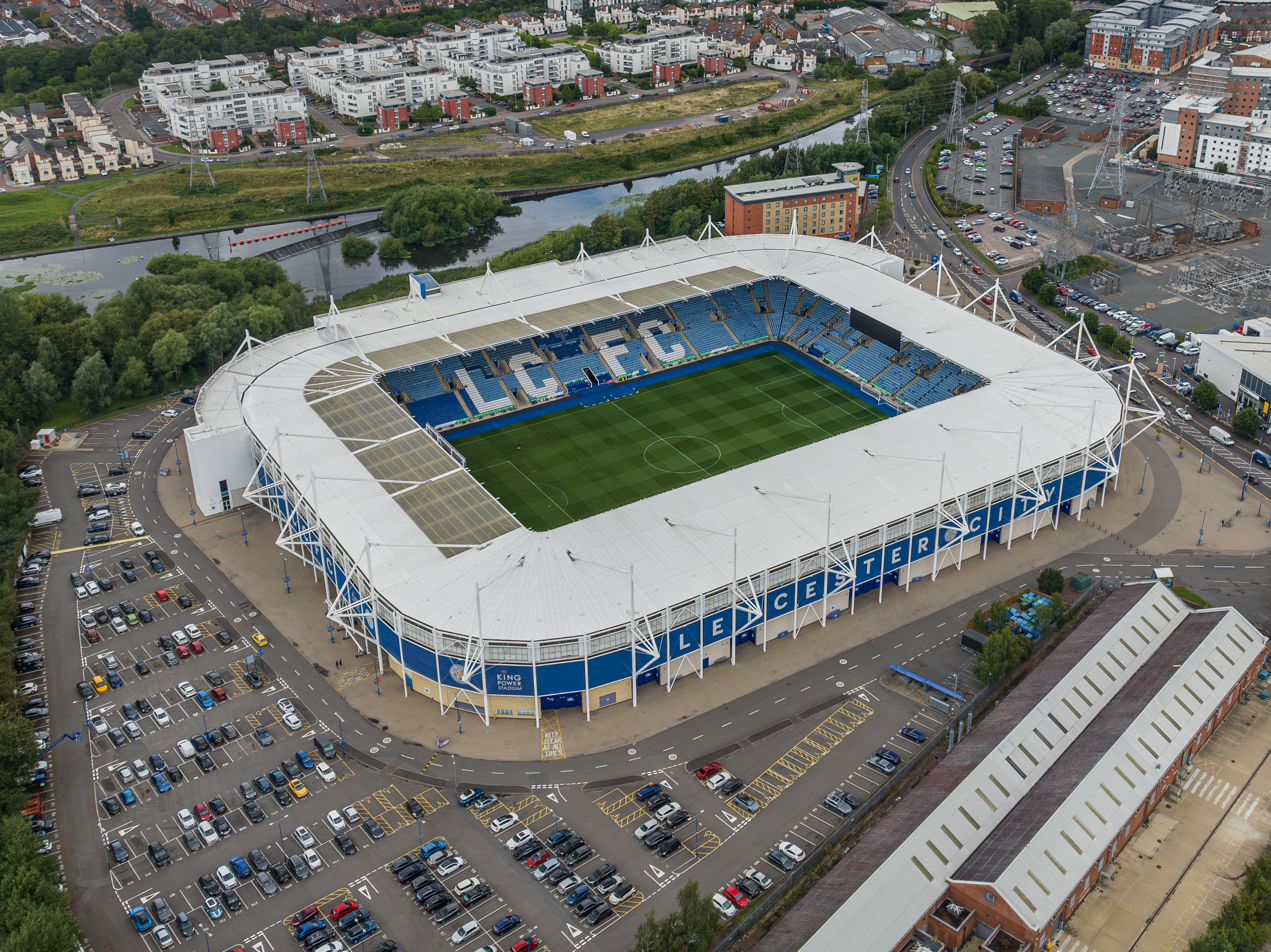
King Power Stadium, home of Leicester City

Leicester Riders are the oldest professional basketball team in the country. In 2016, they moved into the new Charter Street Leicester Community Sports Arena.

Leicestershire County Cricket Club who are a professional cricket club based at Grace Road, Leicester, currently play in the second tier of the county championship. They won the County Championship in 1975, 1996 and 1998.

Leicester City Hockey Club was founded in 1894, and a men's team was established in 2018. The women's team is regarded as one of the oldest and most successful teams in England with six league titles.

Greyhound racing took place at two venues in the city; the main venue was the Leicester Stadium which hosted racing from 1928 to 1984, it also hosted speedway. A smaller track existed at Aylestone Road (1927–1929).

== Public services ==
In the public sector, University Hospitals Leicester NHS Trust is one of the larger employers in the city, with over 12,000 employees working for the Trust. Leicester City Primary Care Trust employs over 1,000 full and part-time staff providing healthcare services in the city. Leicestershire Partnership NHS Trust employs 3,000 staff providing mental health and learning disability services in the city and county.

In the private sector are Nuffield Hospital Leicester and the Spire Hospital Leicester.

== Media ==
=== Print and online ===
The Leicester Mercury was founded by James Thompson in 1874. Until recently, it was based at 16–18 New Walk, but switched to an almost entirely remote operation after the COVID-19 pandemic.

Pukaar Group, a local media company, publishes the Leicester Times.

A co-operative and independent newspaper, the Great Central Gazette, was launched online in March 2023. It was renamed the Leicester Gazette in 2024 and plans to launch a print edition in 2025.

National World has plans to launch online-only Leicester World.

=== Television ===
The Midlands Asian Television channel known as MATV Channel 6 was broadcast in Leicester until late 2009.

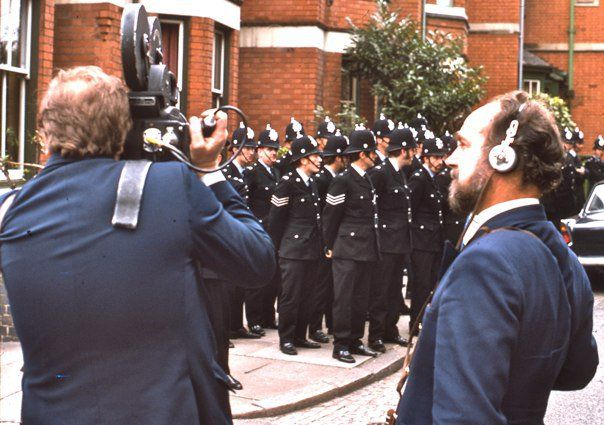
Film crew at work during an "anti-Fascist" march in Leicester, August 1974

=== Radio ===
BBC Radio Leicester was the first BBC Local Radio station in Britain, opening on 8 November 1967. Other analogue FM radio stations are Leicester Community Radio for English speaking over 35's (1449 AM/MW), Demon FM which is Leicester's community and student radio station broadcasting from De Montfort University, Takeover Radio is the first ever children's radio station in the UK to be produced and presented by children, Capital Midlands, Hits Radio East Midlands, Smooth East Midlands and Hindu Sanskar Radio, which only broadcasts during Hindu religious festivals. BBC Asian Network and Sabras Radio broadcast on AM.

The local DAB multiplex includes Capital Midlands, BBC Radio Leicester, Hits Radio East Midlands and Smooth East Midlands.

Leicester's independent radio stations launched a new DAB multiplex in 2023.

There are two hospital radio stations in Leicester, Radio Fox and Radio Gwendolen. Leicester University has a radio station, Galaxy Radio.

== International relations ==
Leicester is twinned with six cities.

- Strasbourg, France (1960)
- Krefeld, Germany (1969)
- Masaya, Nicaragua (1987)
- Chongqing, China (1993)
- Rajkot, India (1996)
- Haskovo, Bulgaria (2008)

Since 1973, the fire services of Leicester and twin city Krefeld have played each other in an annual 'friendly' football match.

== Freedom of the City ==
The following people and military units have received the Freedom of the City of Leicester.

=== Individuals ===
- Thomas Wright: 25 October 1892.
- Edward Wood: 25 October 1892.
- Thomas Windley: 31 March 1903.
- Colonel John Edward Sarson: 31 March 1903.
- Alexander Bains: 29 November 1904.
- William Wilkins Vincent: 28 November 1911.
- Thomas Smith: 3 July 1918.
- Jonathan North: 28 January 1919.
- Admiral of the Fleet Lord Beatty: 28 January 1919.
- Thomas Fielding Johnson: 8 July 1919.
- Field Marshal Lord Haig: 28 February 1922.
- Charles John Bond: 28 April 1925.
- Captain Robert Gee: 28 April 1925.
- James Ramsay MacDonald: 29 October 1929.
- Lord Laig of Lambeth: 28 May 1935.
- Walter Ernest Wilford: 26 July 1949.
- Thomas Rowland Hill: 3 January 1956.
- Lieutenant Colonel Sir Robert Martin: 3 January 1961.
- Sir Charles Robert Keene: 31 July 1962.
- Lord Janner of the City of Leicester: 26 October 1971.
- Sir Frederick Ernest Oliver: 26 October 1971.
- Sidney William Bridges: 26 October 1971.
- Mac Goldsmith: 26 October 1971.
- Sir David Attenborough: 30 November 1989.
- Lord Attenborough of Kingston upon Thames: 30 November 1989.
- Professor Sir Alec Jeffreys: 26 November 1992.
- Gary Lineker: 26 November 1992.
- Frank Ephraim May: 12 July 2001.
- Rosemary Conley: 12 July 2001.
- Engelbert Humperdinck: 25 February 2009.
- Susan Lillian Townsend: 25 February 2009.
- Alan Birchenall: 25 February 2009.

=== Military units ===
- The Royal Anglian Regiment: 25 January 1996.
- The 9th/12th Royal Lancers: 30 June 2011.
