= Coleman, Leicester =

Area of Leicester, England

Coordinates: 52.636°N 1.093°W

Coleman
- Population: 12,099
- Unitary authority: Leicester
- Ceremonial county: Leicestershire
- Region: East Midlands
- Country: England
- Sovereign state: United Kingdom
- Post town: LEICESTER
- Postcode district: LE5
- Dialling code: 0116
- Police: Leicestershire
- Fire: Leicestershire
- Ambulance: East Midlands
- UK Parliament: Leicester East

Coleman was an electoral ward and administrative division of the city of Leicester, England, consisting of the Leicester suburbs of Crown Hills and North Evington. It was replaced by North Evington ward in 2015.

== Geography ==
Coleman was bounded by the wards of Charnwood to the west and north, Humberstone & Hamilton to the north-east, Evington to the east and Spinney Hills to the south.

== History ==
North Evington was originally in the parish of Evington, disconnected from the village itself. The areas in between have been infilled later on. It has been absorbed by the urban district of Highfields which is predominantly a working class area with rows of Victorian terraces to satisfy the needs of workers.

The area was designed and constructed as a suburb, by Arthur Wakerley from the 1880s onwards. By the First World War the area was entirely developed. The area, which was originally outside the borough boundary, was annexed to the borough of Leicester in 1892.

== Education ==
A local secondary school, Crown Hills Community College, is located in the Crown Hills area.
