= Latimer, Leicester =

Coordinates: 52.647°N 1.112°W

Latimer
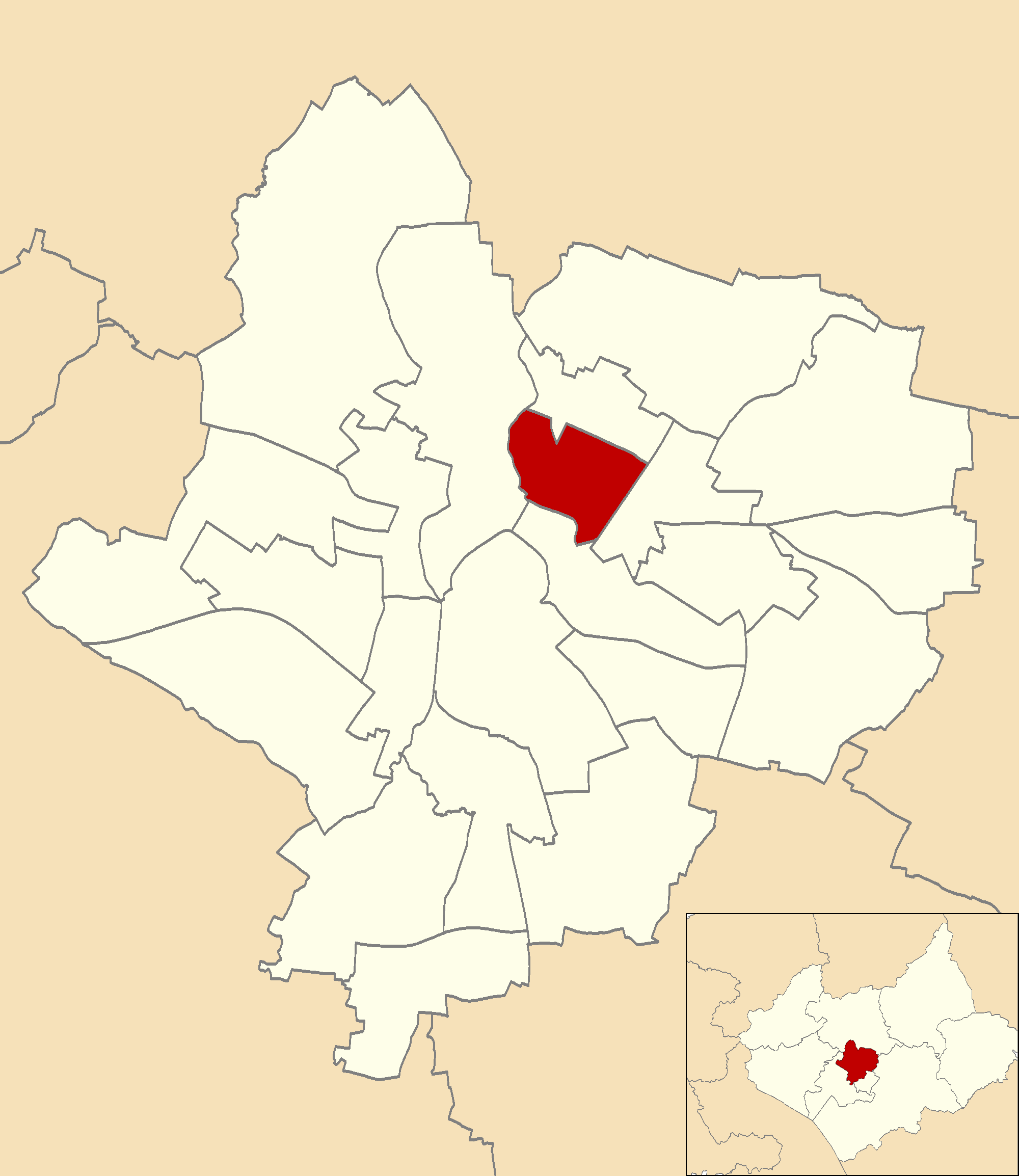
- Population: 11,583
- Unitary authority: Leicester
- Ceremonial county: Leicestershire
- Region: East Midlands
- Country: England
- Sovereign state: United Kingdom
- Post town: LEICESTER
- Postcode district: LE4
- Dialling code: 0116
- Police: Leicestershire
- Fire: Leicestershire
- Ambulance: East Midlands
- UK Parliament: Leicester East

Latimer was an electoral ward and administrative division of the city of Leicester, England, consisting of the residential suburb of St Marks.

== History ==
The St Marks estate was built in the wake of Leicester's slum clearance programmes in 1960.

== Geography ==
Latimer is bounded was the wards of Belgrave to the north, Spinney Hills to the south, Abbey to the west and North Evington to the east.

== Demographics ==
The Latimer ward had a population of 11,583, with an average age of 35, in line with the average for Leicester. It has the highest concentration of Indian residents in Leicester, at 74% of Latimer's population, compared to 25% across the city. Only 16% of Latimer residents are native British.
