= Evington Valley =

Area in Leicester, England

Coordinates: 52.623°N 1.102°W

Evington Valley is an area in Leicester, England. It is roughly bounded by East Park Road to the west (west of which is Highfields), Chesterfield/Ethel Road to the north (north of which is North Evington), Wakerley Road to the east (east of which is Evington village) and to the south borders Stoneygate. The population of the area falls within the Evington ward of Leicester City Council.
