= Rowlatts Hill =

Area of Leicester, England

Coordinates: 52.63194°N 1.07503°W

- Location within Leicestershire
- OS grid reference: SK627042
- Unitary authority: Leicester
- Ceremonial county: Leicestershire
- Region: East Midlands
- Country: England
- Sovereign state: United Kingdom
- Postcode district: LE5
- Dialling code: 0116

Rowlatts Hill (also known as Rowlatts Hill Estate, or R.H.E.) is an eastern, residential suburb of the English city of Leicester. It contains mostly council-owned housing.

The suburb is roughly bordered by Spencefield Lane to the east and Whitehall Road to the south, which separates it from neighbouring Evington. A second internal boundary is defined by Coleman Road, Ambassador Road, and Green Lane Road; Rowlatts Hill borders Crown Hills to the west. To the north of Rowlatts Hill lies Humberstone Park, bounded by Green Lane Road and Ambassador Road. Uppingham Road (the A47) also runs through or borders this northern part of Rowlatts Hill.

Goodwood, a sub-area within Rowlatts Hill, is located to the south-east of the area.

The Leicester General Hospital is located near Goodwood on Coleman Road, which is south of Uppingham Road (the A47).
