= Thurncourt =

Area of Leicester, England

Coordinates: 52.638°N 1.060°W

- Population: 10,596 (2011)
- Unitary authority: Leicester
- Ceremonial county: Leicestershire
- Region: East Midlands
- Country: England
- Sovereign state: United Kingdom
- Post town: LEICESTER
- Postcode district: LE5
- Dialling code: 0116
- Police: Leicestershire
- Fire: Leicestershire
- Ambulance: East Midlands
- UK Parliament: Leicester East

Thurncourt is an electoral ward and administrative division of the city of Leicester, England. The population of the ward at the 2011 census was 10,596. It comprises the suburb and housing estate of Thurnby Lodge in eastern Leicester.

== Geography ==
Thurncourt is bounded by the wards of Evington to the south, and Humberstone & Hamilton to the north. Roughly, it consists of the area inside the city boundary which is north of the Uppingham Road, east of the A563 outer ringroad, and south of the Scraptoft Lane.

The area south of the main shops on Thurncourt Road, towards the parallel railway embankment, was originally mainly unlandscaped country land with a natural stream running through it. The stream divides at a point opposite Thurncourt Road shops into two further tributaries, one which continues on towards the city and the other taking a route southwards under tunnels beneath the railway embankment. This natural area was extensively landscaped in several phases by the Leicester City Council and a floodplain added up until the present day, destroying a natural fertile habitat for the then common water voles and small fresh water fish found within the habitat.

It is near but not part of Thurnby (to the south-east), after which it is named. Other nearby places are Humberstone (north and west), Scraptoft (east), Evington (south) and Goodwood, Leicestershire (south).

== History ==
Thurnby Lodge is a council estate built from the early 1950s onwards to facilitate the central Leicester slum clearance until the 1960s. The area west of Bowhill Grove was the last phase of the estate stretching to Nursery Road at its most westerly point. Two, three and four-bedroomed council houses were built in brick and concrete block, terraced with large rear and smaller front gardens.

Many of the houses on the estate have transferred to private ownership under the right to buy, resulting in a large variety of upgrades and extensions to the original council properties.

== Education ==
There are 2 primary schools on the estate. Thurnby Mead and Willowbrook Mead, both of which are run by Rushy Mead Academy.

== Transport ==
The estate was serviced by Midland Red buses, routes L37 and L38 whose terminus were on Thurncourt Road opposite the shops.

Buses that currently serve the area are: Arriva Midlands services 37 and First Leicester services 38/38A and Centrebus Orbital 40S

== Politics ==
Thurncourt (2)
Party	Candidate	Votes	%	±%
Conservative	John Allen	1,494	27%	
Conservative	Caroline Scuplak	1,219	22%	
Labour	Rikki Thomas	771	14%	
Labour	Gary Nicolle-Anderiesz	730	13%	
BNP	Clive Potter	548	10%	
Independent	Maurice Williams	263	5%	
Green	Janet Elisita	213	4%	
Green	Murray Frankland	174	3%	
UKIP	Margaret Green	113	2%	
UKIP	Stephen Ingall	109	2%	
Turnout		3,112		
Conservative hold		Swing		
Conservative hold		Swing		
