= Arthur Wakerley =

British architect, businessman and politician

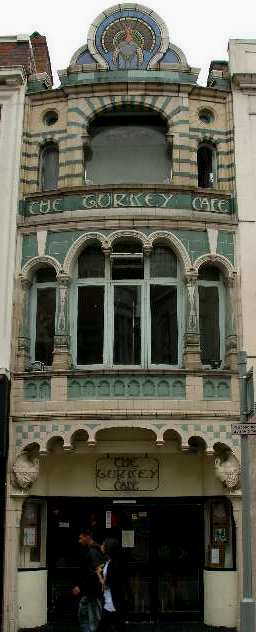
The Turkey Café, Granby Street, Leicester

Arthur Wakerley (15 May 1862 – 4 April 1931) was a British architect, businessman and politician.

== Life ==
Born in Melton Mowbray, he was articled to James Bird. He was a Fellow of the Royal Institute of British Architects and sometime President of the Leicester Society of Architects. He was President of the Leicester Liberal Association and in 1886 was elected as a councillor for Middle St Margaret's Ward and was Mayor of Leicester in 1897, the youngest mayor since the reforms of 1835. He used the role of mayor to support a wide range of charitable and religious works and attempted to position the role of mayor as a non-party political one. His year of office was marred by two local disasters – the railway accident at Wellingborough and the Whitwick Colliery explosion that claimed 35 lives. He stood unsuccessfully as a Liberal Party parliamentary candidate for the Melton Division in 1895 and 1900.

Outside work and politics Arthur Wakerley was an enthusiastic Wesleyan lay preacher and ardent temperance worker as well as being interested in archaeology and poetry.

He planned the development of the North Evington area. Other examples of his architectural work in Leicester include the Turkey Cafe, Granby Street (1901), the Synagogue on Highfield Street, the Coronation Buildings, High Street (1901–03; formerly known as the Singer Building) and the Wycliffe Society Cottage Homes for the Blind.

He was buried in the Welford Road Cemetery, Leicester.

== Listed buildings by Wakerley ==
Below is a list of the fourteen buildings in Leicester by Arthur Wakerley that have been listed. All are Grade II, and most relate to the period 1880s to 1900s. Many more of his building survive without being listed, including factories, terraced housing, semi-detached and detached houses, and 'Crown Hill', a substantial brick mansion he built for himself on Gwendolen Road. The listed post-war houses are four example pairs of the design of council house Wakerley produced in the 1920s, selected because they remain closest to the original design and have their original sash windows. As well as Leicester, the design was widely adopted in Glasgow, Belfast and Welwyn Garden City.

Name	Location	Type	Completed (Note: The date given is the date used by Historic England as significant for the initial building or that of an important part in the structure's description.)	Date designated	Grid ref. (Note: The grid reference is based on the British national grid reference system, sometimes known as OSGB36, used by the Ordnance Survey.) Geo-coordinates	Entry number (Note: The "List Entry Number" is a unique number assigned to each listed building and scheduled monument by Historic England.)	Image
No 8 Bishop Street	Town Hall Square, central Leicester	Solicitor's office	1887	14 March 1975	SK5886104310; 52°38′00″N 1°07′54″W	1200501	No 8 Bishop Street
Smith's shop	122 London Road and 2–4 Highfield Street, Leicester	Shop	1888	14 August 1997	SK5965703688; 52°37′40″N 1°07′12″W	1245131	Smith's shop
Hunter Lodge	138, Gwendolen Road, North Evington, now a local authority hostel, built as house for the Wycliffe Society for the Blind	Houses for blind people	1897	10 September 2001	SK6101704039; 52°37′50″N 1°06′00″W	1389422	Hunter Lodge
Leicester Hebrew Congregation	Synagogue on Highfield Street, Leicester	Place of worship	1897-8	31 January 2002	SK5979503795; 52°37′43″N 1°07′05″W	1389696	Leicester Hebrew Congregation
Belgrave Hall Wesleyan Methodist Church	now Belgrave Community Centre, Leicester, on the corner of Belgrave Road and Rothley Street	Place of worship	1898-9	13 September 2006	SK5943405987; 52°38′54″N 1°07′23″W	1407227	Belgrave Hall Wesleyan Methodist Church
North Evington Police Station	Asfordby Street, Leicester. (Part of the North Evington Development Scheme)	Police Station	1899	15 February 1994	SK6061304791; 52°38′15″N 1°06′21″W	1263368	North Evington Police Station
The Singer Building	Now known as Coronation Building, 76–88 High Street, Leicester	Commercial building	1902–04	12 March 1996	SK5847004521; 52°38′07″N 1°08′15″W	1270257	Upload Photo
Wycliffe Hall	Gedding Road, North Evington. Built as Hall for Blind, now the Sam Cooper Day Centre	Social centre for blind people	1906	10 September 2001	SK6105504032; 52°37′50″N 1°05′58″W	1389423	Upload Photo
Wycliffe Society Houses	65–75 Gedding Road, North Evington	Cottages for blind people	1916–17	10 September 2001	SK6107604054; 52°37′51″N 1°05′57″W	1389424	Upload Photo
Royal Leicestershire, Rutland and Wycliffe Society for the Blind Workshops	Margaret Road, North Evington	Workshops for blind people	1920–23	10 September 2001	SK6101804092; 52°37′52″N 1°06′00″W	1389420	Upload Photo
18 and 20, Linton Street	Highfields ('Wakerley Council House')	Council Houses	1922	9 April 1996	SK6042803535; 52°37′34″N 1°06′31″W	1268496	18 and 20, Linton Street
17 and 19 Dore Road	Highfields (Council Housing to Wakerley's design)	Council Houses	1922	9 April 1996	SK6050803627; 52°37′37″N 1°06′27″W	1268497	17 and 19 Dore Road
19 and 21 Great Arler Road	Knighton Fields (Council Housing to Wakerley's design)	Council Houses	1922	9 April 1996	SK5943101555; 52°36′31″N 1°07′26″W	1268498	19 and 21 Great Arler Road
59 and 61 Dunster Street	Westcotes, (Council Housing to Wakerley's design)	Council Houses	1922	9 April 1996	SK5695004101; 52°37′54″N 1°09′36″W	1268499	Upload Photo
