= 1922 Leicester East by-election =

UK Parliamentary by-election

The 1922 Leicester East by-election was held on 30 March 1922. The by-election was held due to the appointment as Lord Chief Justice of England and Wales of the incumbent Coalition Liberal MP, Gordon Hewart. It was won by the Labour candidate George Banton.

== Candidates ==
The Labour Party selected Leicester Council Alderman George Banton as their candidate. Leicester Council Alderman and former Mayor, Sir Jonathan North was approached to be the Coalition Liberal candidate. However, Albert E. Marlow, President of the Federation of Boot and Shoe Manufacturers ended up as the Coalition Liberal candidate. The Liberal Party approached Alderman Wakerley to be their candidate. Arnold Lupton a former Lincolnshire MP was an advocate of Liberal re-union and offered to stand as a compromise candidate. The Liberals ultimately selected St Albans City Councillor Wilberforce Allen.

== Result ==
Leicester East by-election, 1922
Party	Candidate	Votes	%	±%
Labour	George Banton	14,062	52.9	+25.8
National Liberal	Albert E. Marlow	8,710	32.8	−40.2
Liberal	Ronald Wilberforce Allen	3,825	14.4	N/A
Majority		5,352	20.1	N/A
Turnout		26,597	71.3	+5.7
Labour gain from National Liberal		Swing	+33.0	
