= Umar Mosque (Leicester) =

Mosque located in Leicester, England

- Arabic: مسجد عمر
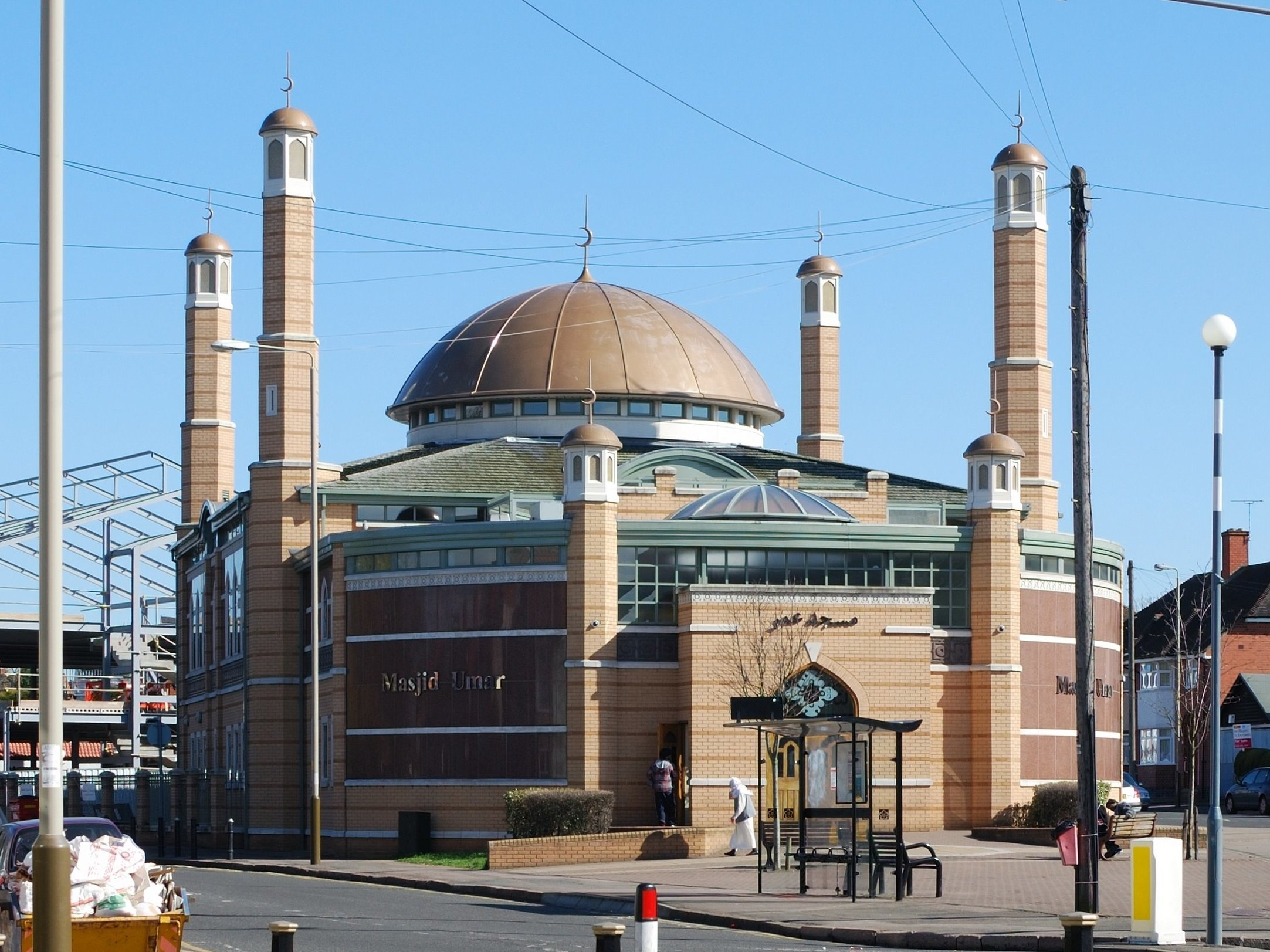
- The mosque exterior, in 2011

- Location of the mosque in Leicester

Religion
- Affiliation: Islam
- Ecclesiastical or organizational status: Mosque
- Status: Active

Location
- Location: 5-7 Evington Drive, Evington, Leicester, England
- Country: United Kingdom
- Interactive map of Umar Mosque
- Coordinates: 52°37′27″N 1°06′06″W

Architecture
- Type: Mosque architecture
- Completed: 2000

Specifications
- Dome: One
- Minaret: Six (maybe more)

Website
- masjid-umar.org

The Umar Mosque, also known as Masjid Umar (Arabic: مسجد عمر), is a mosque, located at 5-7 Evington Drive, in Evington, Leicester, England, in the United Kingdom.

Initially two residential properties, the buildings were demolished in 1999. The mosque was completed in late 2000, and the building was named in honour of the second caliph, Umar.
