= Madani Schools Federation =

Location
- 77 Evington Valley Road; Leicester, Leicestershire, LE5 5LL; England
- Coordinates: 52°37′42″N 1°05′58″W

Information
- Type: Voluntary aided school
- Religious affiliation: Islam
- Founder: LIA Trust
- Local authority: Leicester
- Headteacher: Riyaz Laher
- Gender: Coeducational
- Age: 11 to 16
- Enrolment: 900
- Colours: grey, pink, black
- Website: http://www.madani.leicester.sch.uk

Madani Schools Federation is a Muslim secondary school in Leicester, England. Based in the Evington neighbourhood, Madani Schools Federation caters for the city's Muslim population, with 450 places for boys and girls each. The building itself, designed by Leicester firm Pick Everard with an Islamic design including an Arabic-style courtyard. There is also an associated community centre and madrassa.

The school has also won architectural awards including the Community Benefit award in the regional finals of the Royal Institution of Chartered Surveyors awards in May 2008 and competed in the international finals in the autumn. It is the first state funded Muslim school in the East-Midlands, as 90% of the £18m came from the government, with the Muslim community in Leicester raising the rest. The school has received much press attention as a Muslim secondary school where it is held up as a model for faith schools.

== Concerns and criticism ==
There has been controversy when it was announced that non-Muslim girls would be required to wear the hijab.

The school was criticised after backtracking on an earlier commitments that it would take 10% of its intake from a non-Muslim background. The Headteacher now states that this will only happen once demand from the Muslim community is met. This is in part because in its first year the school received no applications from non-Muslim families.

The school's strict gender segregation policies have also been criticised. The school is divided into two separate wings, one for boys and the other for girls, connected by a central foyer.
