= Turkey Cafe =

Listed building in Leicester, United Kingdom

Coordinates: 52.63403°N 1.13075°W

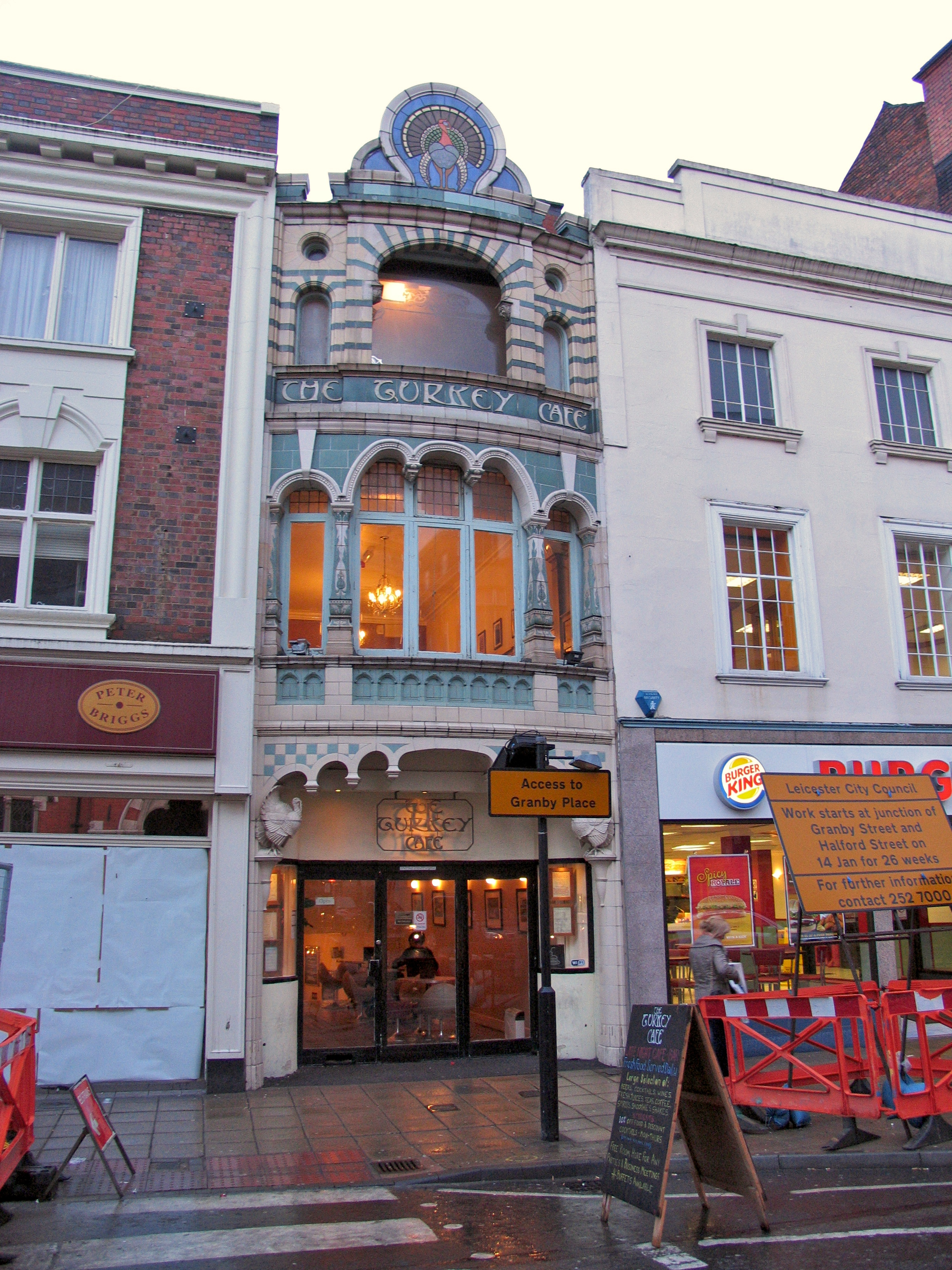
Facade of the Turkey Cafe

The Turkey Cafe is a building with a flamboyant Modern Style (British Art Nouveau style) facade in Granby Street, Leicester, England. It was built in 1900 and is now a Grade II listed building, once again used as a café. The facade puns on two meanings of "turkey", with a vaguely Eastern exotic style of architecture and three large turkey birds on the facade, one sculpted on each side of the ground floor shopfront and another forming a large coloured panel of Royal Doulton tiles right at the top.

== History ==
The site of the Turkey Cafe was owned by James Wesley, a grocer and confectioner, from 1877 to 1899. Wesley sold the site to architect Arthur Wakerley, a well-known Leicester architect who was also a prominent supporter of the Temperance Movement. Upon completion he leased it to John Winn, who owned a number of other cafes in Manchester and the Oriental Cafe in Leicester. The offices of Wakerley's architectural practice were above Winn's Oriental Cafe, making it easy to negotiate a deal regarding the construction and occupancy of a new cafe on Granby Street. Wakerley approached the Royal Doulton Company for help constructing his design for the new "Turkey Cafe".

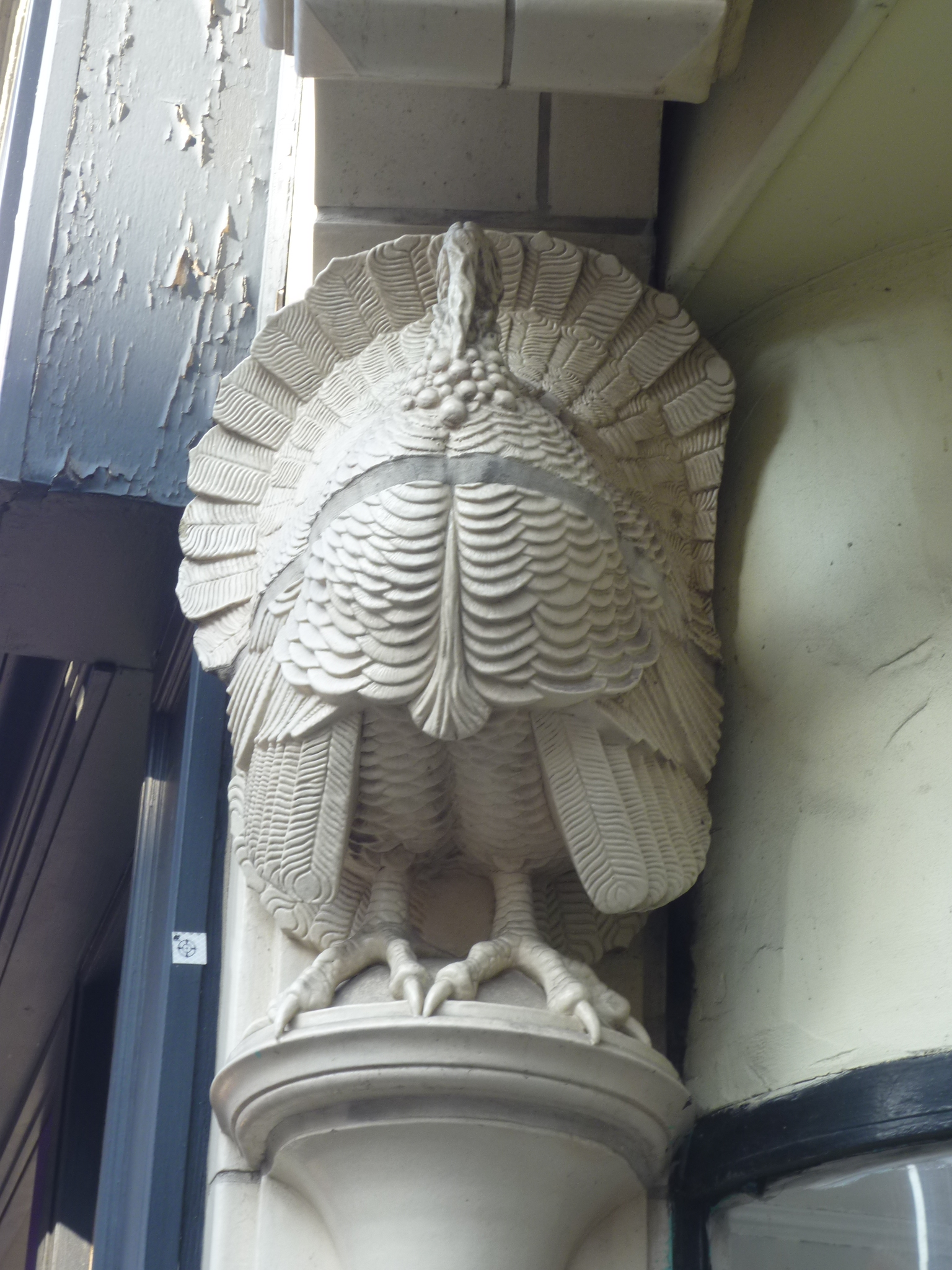
One of the shopfront turkeys

The style of the Turkey Cafe reflected what was popular at that time, which was the new trend of art nouveau. The building created a sense of stability by visually implying a pyramid structure. This was done by having seven arches on the ground floor and then decreasing the number of arches on each level. The pyramid is completed with a single turkey located at the top of the building. The building was coloured blue, green, and buff, which allowed any onlooker to fully appreciate the shapes and curves of the building's designs. The facade was constructed using tiles, hollow blocks, and a type of white architectural terracotta called carraraware. The Doultons actually developed carraraware in 1888, which is a matt-glazed stoneware. The carraware tiles of this frontage were handmade by William Neatby, a ceramic artist who worked for the Doultons. In addition to these features, art nouveau can be found in the decorations etched into the front window, as well as the red and green art nouveau designs of the rear tea room windows.

The Turkey Cafe was opened in September 1901 and was later renumbered 24 Granby Street. As a tea room, the cafe was popular with women. Not only was it a respectable venue for gathering, but it provided a convenient meeting place to discuss the progress of women's rights. However, the cafe was not designed with only women in mind. Located in the back of the cafe was the Smoke Room. This room with its dark interior provided a place for men to gather and converse as well. The popularity of the cafe rose so high that in 1911 Winn expanded into the building next door, which used to be William Wheeler Kendall's "Umbrella Manufacturer and Can Stick Merchant." This change allowed Winn to expand the restaurant and storage space, and add a billiard room.

Further renovations were made in 1927 when Winn decided to modernise the entrance, making the front appear more art deco than art nouveau. Wakerley allowed the changes, as long as Winn restored the shop to its original appearance once the lease was done. Unfortunately, when Winn's family sold the Turkey Cafe to Brucciani Bakers Ltd in 1963, no restoration actually occurred. Under the Brucciani family, the Turkey cafe became a coffee and ice-cream shop. The reputation of the cafe as a location for woman to gather continued, and in 1966, the cafe had a "Ladies Only" room. After the Sex Discrimination Act 1975 came into law, they could no longer prohibit men from entering. In 1968, the cafe was once again renovated. The result was a mixture of old and new. The original interior tiled walls were panelled over, a tiled mural of a turkey was added, and smaller windows were inserted.

The Turkey Cafe underwent yet another renovation process after Rayner Opticians Ltd purchased the property in 1982. The interior was altered greatly to accommodate the new business that it would house, and curved windows were added to the above stories. However, the etched glass windows on the ground floor and the front arch were kept and restored to their original condition. Rayners tracked down the Hathernware Ceramics Ltd of Loughborough who was the only firm experienced in using the terra cotta material needed for restoration. The opticians were also fortunate enough to have the original architectural drawings and a 1910 photograph, which architects Sawday and Moffat had in their archives. Rayners then commissioned Deardon Briggs Designs Ltd to follow these plans for the restoration process and creation of reproductions. In the end, the restoration of the exterior cost over £30,000, with Leicester City Council contributing £5,000.

For two decades the building served as an optician's office, but in 2014 the building was returned to its original purpose as a cafe during the day and a cocktail bar at night. Now called 1901 – The Turkey Cafe representing the year the building was constructed and many original features have been exposed and restored. The building has also been listed as a Grade II building for its art nouveau style architecture, making it clear that the building is of architectural and historic special interest. To the people of Leicester, the building certainly is worth preserving and does have an interesting history. The building has served as a cafe, restaurant, meeting place, ice-cream parlour, and unexpectedly an office for opticians. While numerous buildings were destroyed during and after the World Wars, including all of Winn's other cafes, the Turkey Cafe has remained. Now, the building has come full circle, standing restored in its original appearance and serving as a cafe.

=== Gallery of details ===
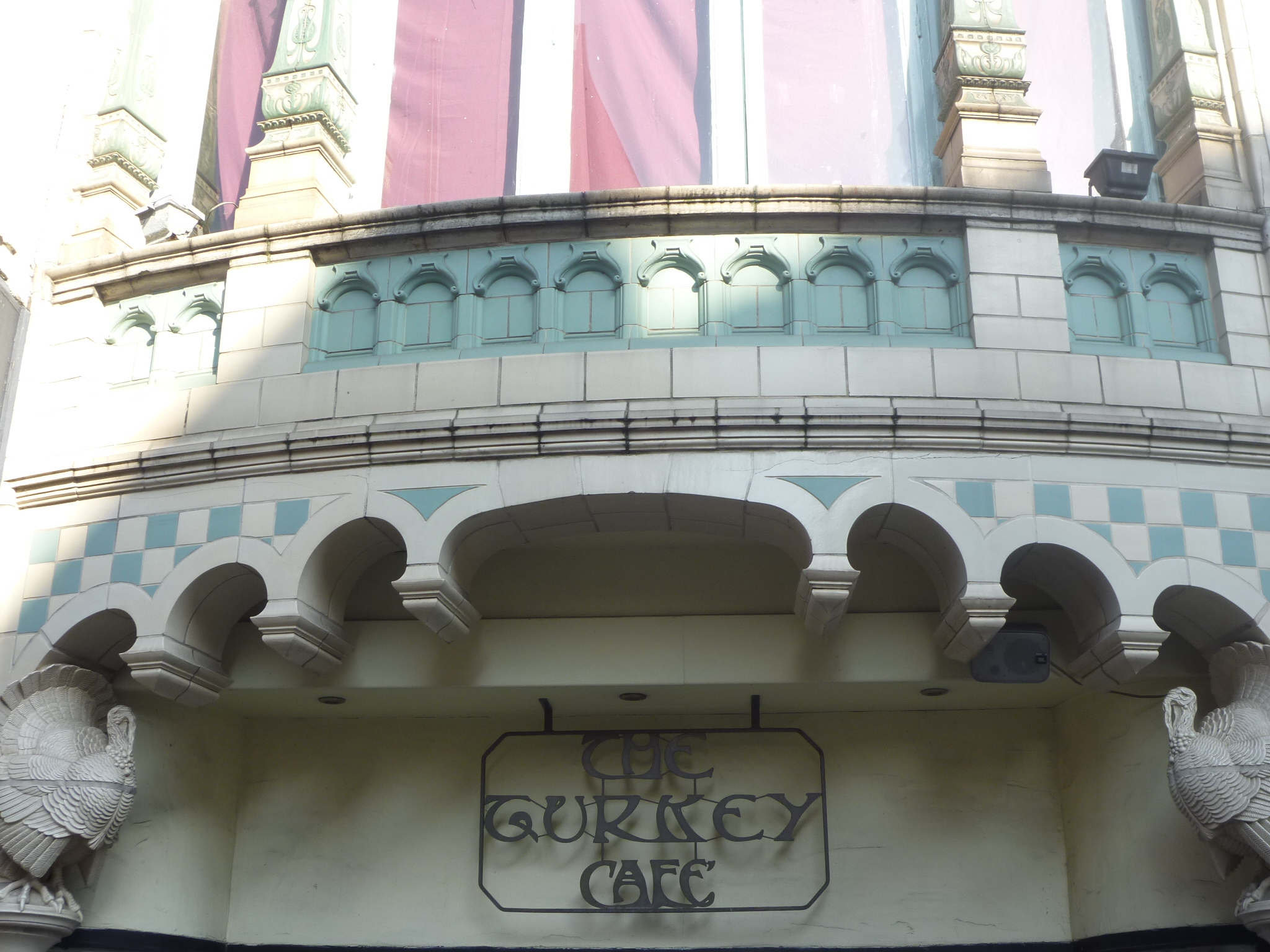
Above the entrance

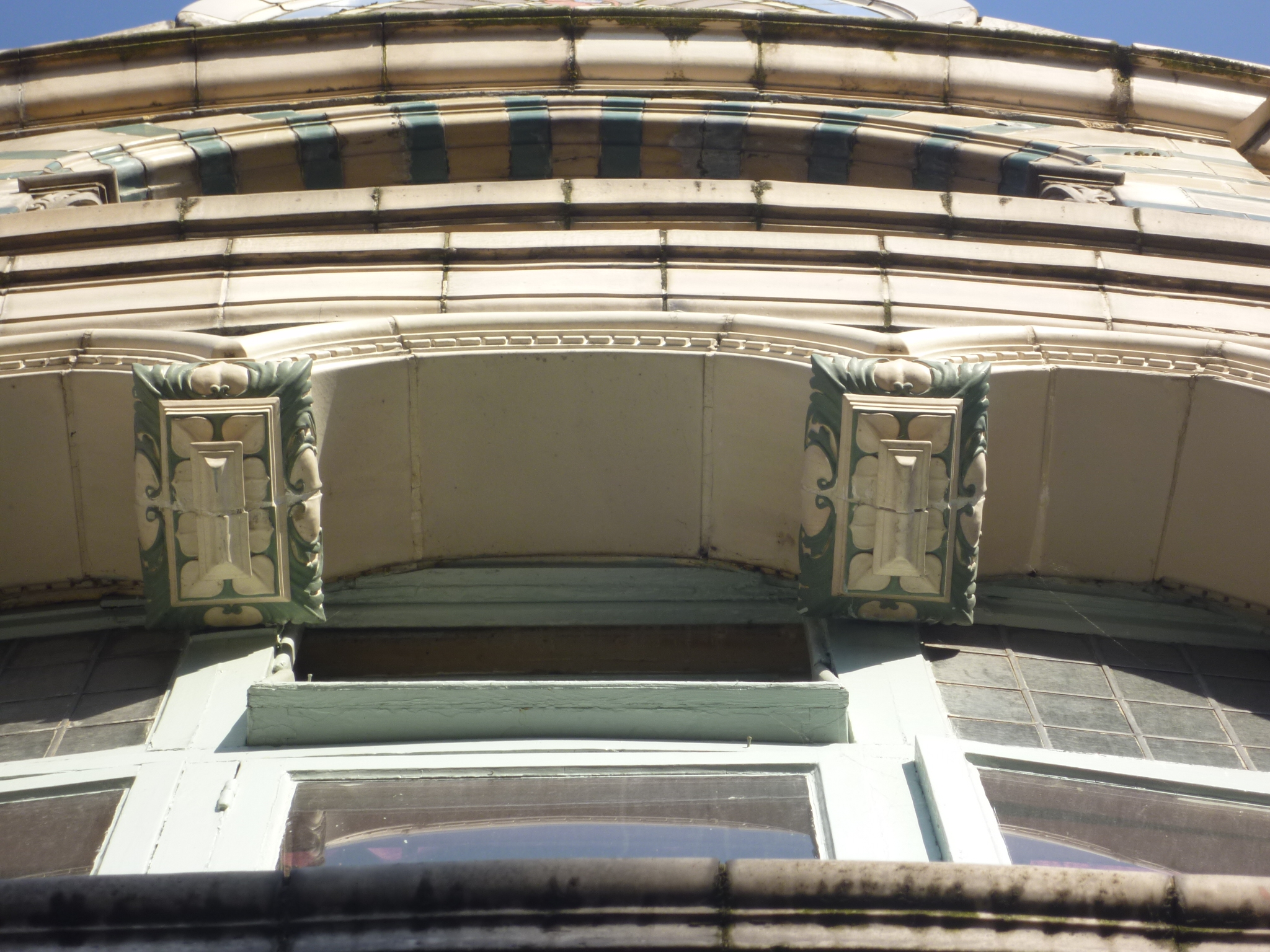
Looking up from the entrance

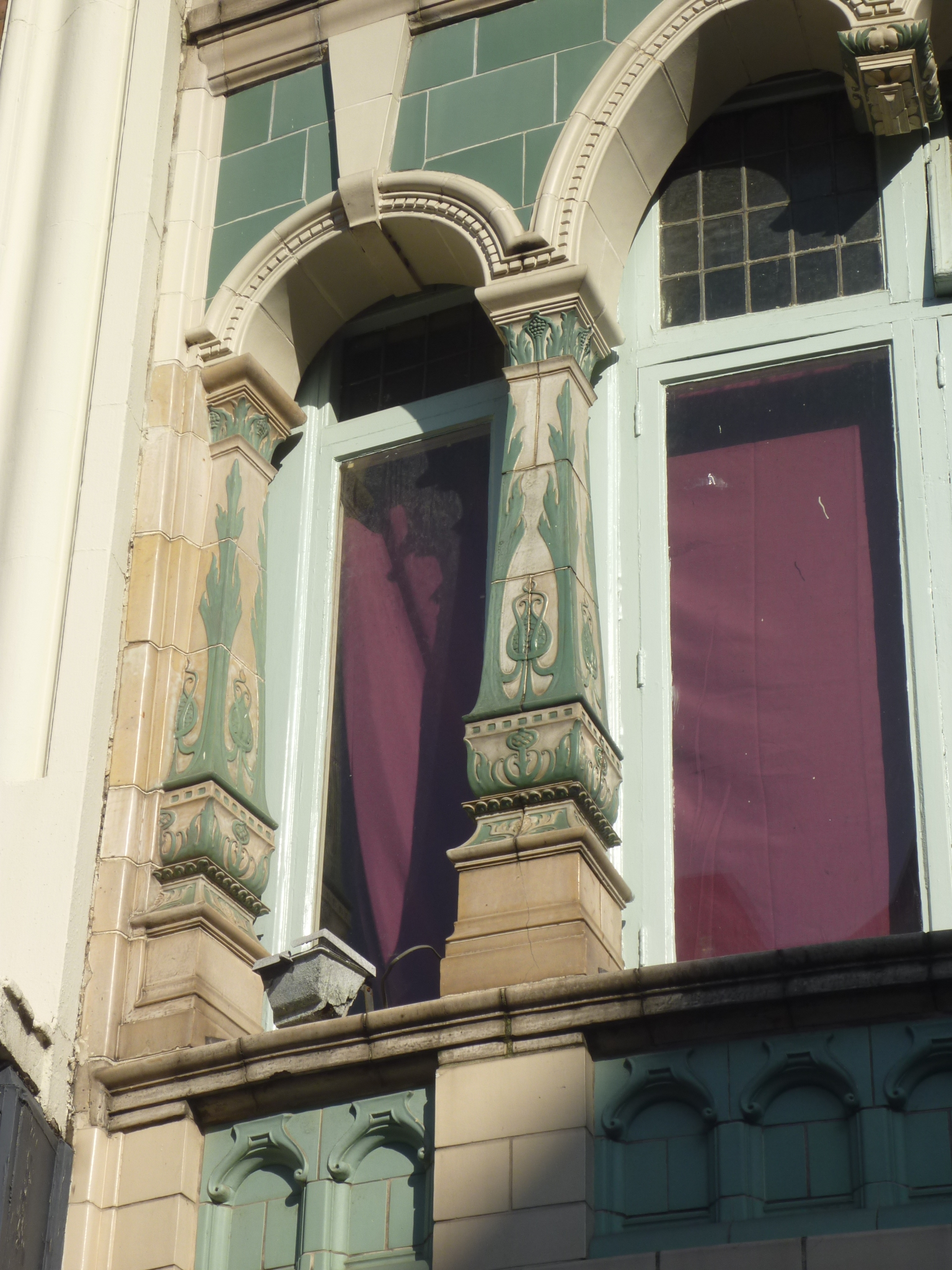
First floor

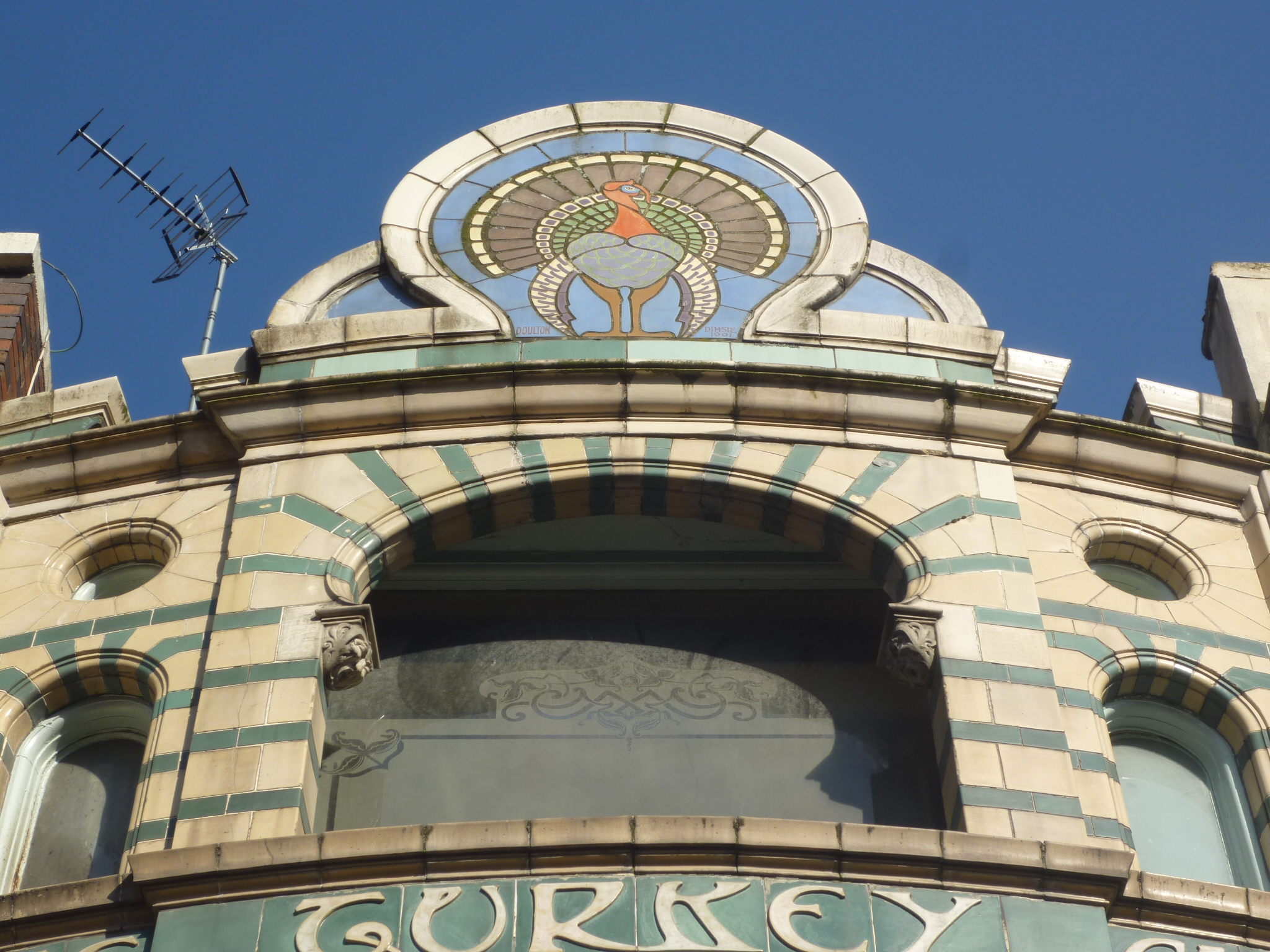
Top storey
