= George Banton =

British Labour Party Member of Parliament

George Banton (1856 – 19 April 1932) was a Labour politician in England.

A long-serving alderman in Leicester, and leader of the Labour Party in Leicester, Banton was elected as the Member of Parliament (MP) Leicester East at a by-election March 1922. He made his maiden speech on 4 April, about old-age pensions.

He was defeated at the general election in November 1922.

He regained the seat at the 1923 general election, but was defeated again at the 1924 general election.

Parliament of the United Kingdom
Preceded by Sir Gordon Hewart	Member of Parliament for Leicester East; March 1922 – 1922	Succeeded by Arthur Evans
Preceded by Arthur Evans	Member of Parliament for Leicester East; 1923 – 1924	Succeeded by John Loder
Party political offices
Preceded by Clement Bundock	Midlands Division representative on the National Administrative Council of the Independent Labour Party; 1924–1925	Succeeded by Fred Longden
