= Peter Bruinvels =

British Conservative politician

Member of Parliament for Leicester East
- In office 9 June 1983 – 18 May 1987
- Preceded by: Tom Bradley
- Succeeded by: Keith Vaz

Personal details
- Born: Peter Nigel Edward Bruinvels; 30 March 1950 (age 76) Surrey, England
- Party: Conservative
- Education: St John's School, Leatherhead
- Occupation: Governor of the Church Commissioners, former politician
- Awards: Canterbury Cross for Services to the Church of England (2017)

Peter Nigel Edward Bruinvels (born 30 March 1950) is a governor of the Church Commissioners and former Conservative MP.

== Views on Homosexuality ==
As an MP in 1986, Bruinvels was opposed to equal rights for the LGBT community and was a strong supporter of Section 28 saying: "I do not agree with homosexuality. I think that Clause 28 will help outlaw it and the rest will be done by AIDS, with a substantial number of homosexuals dying of AIDS. I think that's probably the best way."

In 1997 as a member of the Church of England's General Synod, Bruinvels said he would be spearheading moves to stop the ordination of known homosexuals: "Bishops have a moral responsibility to safeguard marriage and family life and by ordaining known homosexuals, they are sending out the wrong signals."

Bruinvels issued a statement in February 2022 apologizing for and repudiating his 1986 statements. Published in the Surrey County Council's staff newsletter, Bruinvels indicated how the years since 1986 had changed his attitude and perceptions, as well as noting actions he has taken recently which have been contra to his prior position: "I have had a lot of time to reflect on this especially as I have developed close friendships with a number of gay people as well as family members who have come out as gay and realise how wrong I was in making those comments then, some 36 years ago. I am now trying to publicly demonstrate that I have learned the lessons of my past discriminatory behaviour through the actions I have since taken, including recently supporting trans-gender and same-sex blessings in Church as well as voting to ban the practice of Conversion Therapy on General Synod."

== Honours ==
In 2017, Bruinvels was awarded the Canterbury Cross for Services to the Church of England "for sustained and outstanding work in support of the Church of England".

Parliament of the United Kingdom
| Preceded by Tom Bradley | Member of Parliament for Leicester East; 1983–1987 | Succeeded by Keith Vaz |
