= Leicester East =

UK Parliament constituency (since 1974)

Coordinates: 52.64°N 1.08°W

- Borough constituency for the House of Commons
- Interactive map of boundaries since 2024
- Location within the East Midlands
- County: Leicestershire
- Electorate: 76,465 (March 2020)

Current constituency
- Created: 1974
- Member of Parliament: Shivani Raja (Conservative)
- Seats: One
- Created from: Leicester South East; Leicester North East

1918–1950
- Seats: One
- Created from: Leicester
- Replaced by: Leicester South East; Leicester North East

Leicester East is a constituency (Note: A borough constituency (for the purposes of election expenses and type of returning officer).) represented in the House of Commons of the UK Parliament since July 2024 by Shivani Raja of the Conservative Party.

== Constituency profile ==
Leicester East is an urban constituency in Leicestershire. It covers the eastern neighbourhoods of the city of Leicester, including Humberstone, Hamilton, Belgrave, Rushey Mead, North Evington and Thurncourt. Leicester has a strong association with the textile, clothing and shoemaking industries, which – having suffered a devastating slump in the early 1980s – survived in the city in a vestigial form until recently but mostly collapsed during the 2020s. The Leicester East constituency has high levels of deprivation, particularly in the areas close to the city centre with densely packed terraced housing, such as Belgrave. House prices in the constituency are similar to those in the rest of the East Midlands and lower than the national average.

In general, residents of the constituency are young and have low levels of education, income and professional employment. A high proportion work in the manufacturing and retail sectors. Leicester East has the highest percentage of Asian residents of any constituency in the United Kingdom; they made up 69% of the population at the 2021 census and most are of Indian origin. A majority of the Asian population are Hindu but there are also many Muslims and Sikhs. The Asian community mostly arrived in Leicester during the 1960s and 1970s, with many coming from Uganda as refugees following their expulsion from that country. White people made up 20% of residents in 2021, most of whom live on the city's outskirts in and around Thurncourt. On Leicester City Council, the more central, densely-populated areas of this constituency are represented by Conservatives while the outer, more suburban areas have elected Labour Party councillors. An estimated 51% of voters in Leicester East supported leaving the European Union in the 2016 referendum, similar to the nationwide figure of 52%.

== History ==
=== First creation ===
The seat was created in 1918 and for the next four years was served by Sir Gordon Hewart KC, who resigned to become Lord Chief Justice of England and Wales. In 1950 the area was divided between Leicester North East and Leicester South East.

=== Second (current) creation ===
The constituency was re-created in 1974.

Summary of results

Leicester East has been won by the Labour Party's candidate in 12 of the 14 elections since it was re-created. Its MP from 1987 to 2019, Keith Vaz, won an absolute majority of votes from the 1992 general election onward. It had been narrowly won by Conservative Party candidate Peter Bruinvels (a lay canon) at the height of his party's popularity in 1983. The following election saw Vaz regain the seat for Labour; he held it at every election thereafter, from 1997 onward always winning by margins of over 29% and 13,000 votes, until he stood down at the 2019 general election. The result in 2015 made the constituency the 37th-safest of Labour's 232 seats by percentage majority. Vaz won his highest majority, 22,428 votes (42.8%), in 2017. In 2019 Labour held the seat with a substantially reduced majority of 6,019, down from 22,428 – a swing of 15%.

The constituency was the sole gain by the Conservatives at the 2024 general election, when Shivani Raja was elected with 31.1% of the vote.

Opposition parties

The Conservative Party candidate has been runner-up in every election save for Bruinvels' win in 1983 and Raja's victory in 2024. The candidate of UKIP took third place in 2015, for the first time; her 2010 counterpart had won 1.5% of the vote, the party not having previously stood in the constituency. The pro-UKIP swing between the 2010 and 2015 elections, of 7.4%, was less than the national average of 9.5%. Susan Cooper was 1.8% away from second place in 2005, giving the best result of a Liberal Democrat to date, attracting just under a fifth of the vote.

Turnout

Turnout in the recreated seat has ranged between 78.7% in 1992 and 61.0% in 2024.

== Boundaries ==
=== Historic ===
1918–1950: The County Borough of Leicester wards of Belgrave, Latimer, Spinney Hill, and West Humberstone.

1974–1983: The County Borough of Leicester wards of Belgrave, Charnwood, Evington, Humberstone, and Latimer.

1983–2010: The City of Leicester wards of Belgrave, Charnwood, Coleman, Evington, Humberstone, Latimer, Rushey Mead, Thurncourt, and West Humberstone.

2010–2024: The City of Leicester wards of Belgrave, Charnwood, Coleman, Evington, Humberstone & Hamilton, Latimer, Rushey Mead, and Thurncourt.

Further to a local government boundary review which became effective in May 2015, North Evington and Troon wards were created, replacing the Charnwood, Coleman and Latimer wards.

=== Current ===
The City of Leicester wards of:

- Belgrave, Evington (most), Humberstone & Hamilton, North Evington, Rushey Mead, Thurncourt and Troon.

Following the 2023 review of Westminster constituencies, which came into effect for the 2024 general election, the constituency was adjusted slightly by transferring polling district EVF in Evington ward to Leicester South.

== Members of Parliament ==
=== MPs 1918–1950 ===
Leicester prior to 1918

Year	Member	Party
1918	Sir Gordon Hewart	Coalition Liberal
Jan 1922	Sir Gordon Hewart	National Liberal
Mar 1922 by-election	George Banton	Labour
Nov 1922	Arthur Evans	National Liberal
Aug 1923	Arthur Evans	Unionist
Dec 1923	George Banton	Labour
1924	John Loder	Unionist
1929	Frank Wise	Labour
1931	Abraham Lyons	Conservative
1945	Terence Donovan	Labour
1950	Constituency abolished	

=== MPs since 1974 ===
Leicester South East and Leicester North East prior to 1974

Year	Member	Party
Feb 1974	Tom Bradley	Labour
1981	Tom Bradley	SDP
1983	Peter Bruinvels	Conservative
1987	Keith Vaz	Labour
2019	Claudia Webbe	Labour
2020	Claudia Webbe	Independent
2024	Shivani Raja	Conservative

== Elections ==
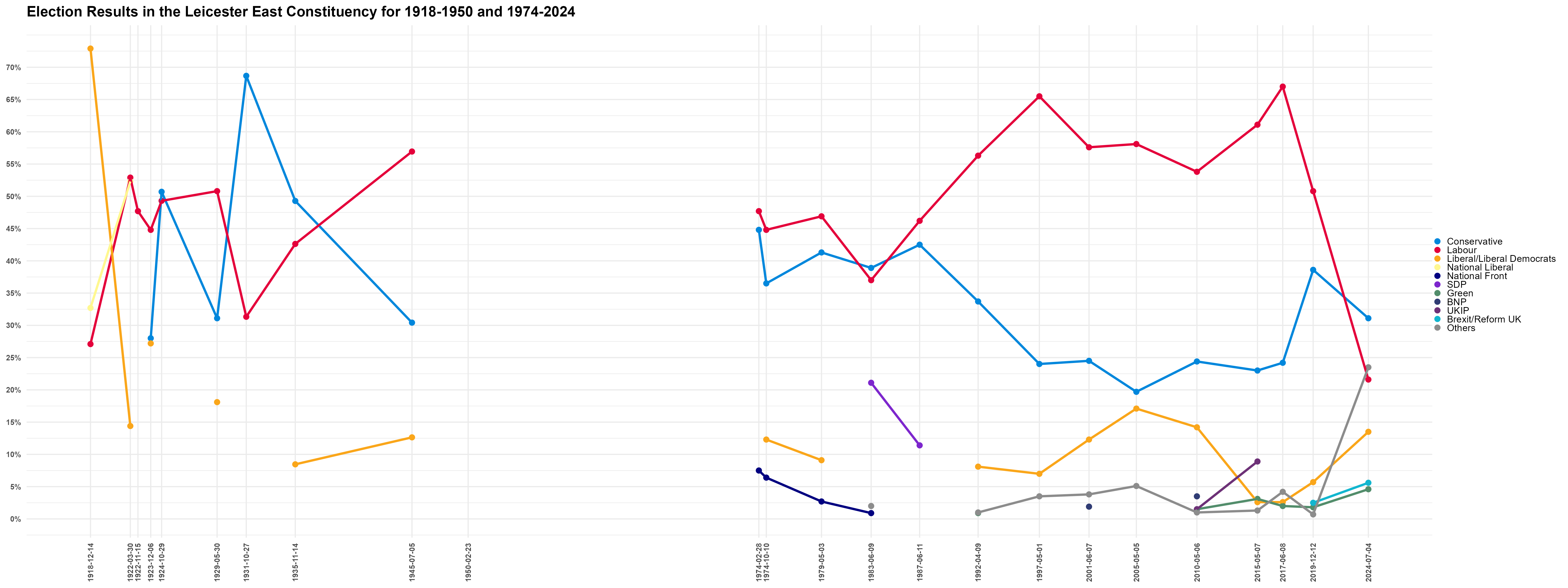
Leicester East vote share as a percentage since the seat's formation in 1918 and reformation in 1974.

=== Elections in the 2020s ===
General election 2024: Leicester East
Party	Candidate	Votes	%	±%
Conservative	Shivani Raja	14,526	31.1	–7.4
Labour	Rajesh Agrawal	10,100	21.6	–29.3
Liberal Democrats	Zuffar Haq	6,329	13.5	+7.9
Independent (Note: Webbe contested the election as an independent, but received endorsement by the Workers Party of Britain.)	Claudia Webbe	5,532	11.8	N/A
One Leicester	Keith Vaz	3,681	7.9	N/A
Reform	Raj Solanki	2,611	5.6	+3.1
Green	Mags Lewis	2,143	4.6	+2.8
Independent	Malihah Adam	974	2.1	N/A
Independent	Nagarjun Agath	703	1.5	N/A
Independent	Khandu Patel	115	0.2	N/A
Majority		4,426	9.5	N/A
Turnout		46,714	61.0	–2.1
Registered electors		76,560		
Conservative gain from Labour		Swing	+11.0	

=== Elections in the 2010s ===
General election 2019: Leicester East
Party	Candidate	Votes	%	±%
Labour	Claudia Webbe	25,090	50.8	–16.2
Conservative	Bhupendra Dave	19,071	38.6	+14.4
Liberal Democrats	Nitesh Dave	2,800	5.7	+3.1
Brexit Party	Tara Baldwin	1,243	2.5	N/A
Green	Melanie Wakley	888	1.8	−0.2
Independent	Sanjay Gogia	329	0.7	N/A
Majority		6,019	12.2	–30.6
Turnout		49,421	63.0	–4.4
Labour hold		Swing	–15.3	

In November 2021, Webbe was given a 10-week suspended sentence for making threatening phone calls to a friend of her partner. Webbe, who since September 2020 had been suspended from the Labour Party and was sitting as an independent MP, was then expelled from the party and continued to sit as an independent until Parliament was dissolved.

General election 2017: Leicester East
Party	Candidate	Votes	%	±%
Labour	Keith Vaz	35,116	67.0	+5.9
Conservative	Edward Yi He	12,688	24.2	+1.2
Independent	Sujata Barot	1,753	3.3	N/A
Liberal Democrats	Nitesh Dave	1,343	2.6	0.0
Green	Melanie Wakley	1,070	2.0	–1.1
Independent	Ian Fox	454	0.9	N/A
Majority		22,428	42.8	+4.6
Turnout		52,424	67.4	+3.7
Labour hold		Swing	+2.3	

General election 2015: Leicester East
Party	Candidate	Votes	%	±%
Labour	Keith Vaz	29,386	61.1	+7.4
Conservative	Kishan Devani	11,034	23.0	–1.5
UKIP	Susanna Steptoe	4,290	8.9	+7.4
Green	Nimit Jethwa	1,468	3.1	+1.5
Liberal Democrats	Dave Raval	1,233	2.6	–11.6
TUSC	Michael Barker	540	1.1	N/A
Independent	Tom Darwood	117	0.2	N/A
Majority		18,352	38.2	+8.9
Turnout		48,068	63.7	–2.1
Labour hold		Swing	+4.5	

General election 2010: Leicester East
Party	Candidate	Votes	%	±%
Labour	Keith Vaz	25,804	53.8	−5.0
Conservative	Jane Hunt	11,722	24.4	+4.6
Liberal Democrats	Ali Asghar	6,817	14.2	−2.3
BNP	Colin Gilmore	1,700	3.5	N/A
Green	Mo Taylor	733	1.5	N/A
UKIP	Felicity Ransome	725	1.5	N/A
Unity For Peace And Socialism	Avtar Sadiq	494	1.0	N/A
Majority		14,082	29.3	–9.6
Turnout		47,995	65.8	+3.9
Labour hold		Swing	−4.8	

=== Elections in the 2000s ===
General election 2005: Leicester East
Party	Candidate	Votes	%	±%
Labour	Keith Vaz	24,015	58.1	+0.5
Conservative	Suella Fernandes	8,139	19.7	−4.8
Liberal Democrats	Susan Cooper	7,052	17.1	+4.8
Veritas	Colin Brown	1,666	4.0	N/A
Socialist Labour	Valerie Smalley	434	1.1	−1.0
Majority		15,876	38.4	+5.3
Turnout		41,306	62.2	+0.1
Labour hold		Swing	+2.6	

In 2005 this seat bucked the national trend as there was a swing to Labour whereas the national swing was 2.5% to the Conservatives.

General election 2001: Leicester East
Party	Candidate	Votes	%	±%
Labour	Keith Vaz	23,402	57.6	−7.9
Conservative	John Mugglestone	9,960	24.5	+0.5
Liberal Democrats	Harpinder Athwal	4,989	12.3	+5.3
Socialist Labour	David Roberts	837	2.1	+1.1
BNP	Clive Potter	772	1.9	N/A
Independent	Shirley Bennett	701	1.7	+1.5
Majority		13,442	33.1	–8.4
Turnout		40,661	62.1	−7.0
Labour hold		Swing	–4.2	

=== Elections in the 1990s ===
General election 1997: Leicester East
Party	Candidate	Votes	%	±%
Labour	Keith Vaz	29,083	65.5	+9.2
Conservative	Simon Milton	10,661	24.01	–9.7
Liberal Democrats	Jay Matabudul	3,105	6.99	−1.1
Referendum	Philip Iwaniw	1,015	2.29	N/A
Socialist Labour	Sohan Singh Sidhu	436	0.98	N/A
Independent	Neil Slack	102	0.23	N/A
Majority		18,422	41.49	+18.9
Turnout		44,402	69.11	
Labour hold		Swing	+9.4	

General election 1992: Leicester East
Party	Candidate	Votes	%	±%
Labour	Keith Vaz	28,123	56.3	+10.1
Conservative	Jeffery C. Stevens	16,807	33.7	−8.8
Liberal Democrats	Sheila A. Mitchell	4,043	8.1	−3.3
Green	Murray R. Frankland	453	0.9	N/A
Independent	Dennis J. Taylor	308	0.6	N/A
Natural Law	ASK Mahaldar	186	0.4	N/A
Majority		11,316	22.6	+18.9
Turnout		49,920	78.7	+0.1
Labour hold		Swing	+9.5	

=== Elections in the 1980s ===
General election 1987: Leicester East
Party	Candidate	Votes	%	±%
Labour	Keith Vaz	24,074	46.2	+9.2
Conservative	Peter Bruinvels	22,150	42.5	+3.6
SDP (Liberal)	Aileen Ayres	5,935	11.4	–9.7
Majority		1,924	3.7	N/A
Turnout		52,159	78.59	
Labour gain from Conservative		Swing		

General election 1983: Leicester East
Party	Candidate	Votes	%	±%
Conservative	Peter Bruinvels	19,117	38.9	–2.3
Labour	Patricia Hewitt	18,184	37.0	–9.9
SDP (Liberal)	Tom Bradley	10,362	21.1	+12.0
Independent	RV Ganatra	970	2.0	N/A
BNP	RL Sutton	459	0.9	N/A
Majority		933	1.9	N/A
Turnout		49,092	73.2	–2.4
Conservative gain from Labour		Swing	+3.8	

=== Elections in the 1970s ===
General election 1979: Leicester East
Party	Candidate	Votes	%	±%
Labour	Tom Bradley	23,844	46.9	+2.1
Conservative	M Waterhouse	20,988	41.3	+4.8
Liberal	B Andrews	4,623	9.1	–3.2
National Front	BJ Calver	1,385	2.7	–3.7
Majority		2,856	5.6	–2.6
Turnout		50,840	75.6	+3.3
Labour hold		Swing	+1.4	

General election October 1974: Leicester East
Party	Candidate	Votes	%	±%
Labour	Tom Bradley	20,688	44.8	+0.1
Conservative	KG Reeves	16,877	36.5	–8.3
Liberal	W Capstick	5,668	12.3	N/A
National Front	A Reed-Herbert	2,967	6.4	−1.1
Majority		3,811	8.3	+5.4
Turnout		46,200	72.3	–5.5
Labour hold		Swing	+4.2	

General election February 1974: Leicester East
Party	Candidate	Votes	%	±%
Labour	Tom Bradley	23,474	47.7	
Conservative	K.G. Reeves	22,061	44.8	
National Front	K. Sanders	3,662	7.5	
Majority		1,413	2.9	
Turnout		49,199	77.8	
Labour win (new seat)				

=== Elections in the 1940s ===
General election 1945: Leicester East
Party	Candidate	Votes	%	±%
Labour	Terence Donovan	28,414	56.9	+14.6
Conservative	Abraham Lyons	15,182	30.4	–18.9
Liberal	David Goodwillie Galloway	6,306	12.6	+4.1
Majority		13,232	26.52	N/A
Turnout		49,902	76.0	
Labour gain from Conservative		Swing	+16.7	

=== Elections in the 1930s ===
General election 1935: Leicester East
Party	Candidate	Votes	%	±%
Conservative	Abraham Lyons	20,442	49.3	–19.4
Labour	Frederick Gould	17,532	42.3	+11.0
Liberal	Frederick Lawson	3,509	8.5	N/A
Majority		2,910	6.66	
Turnout		41,483	70.18	
Conservative hold		Swing	–15.2	

General election 1931: Leicester East
Party	Candidate	Votes	%	±%
Conservative	Abraham Lyons	30,265	68.7	+37.6
Labour	Frank Wise	13,811	31.3	–19.5
Majority		16,454	37.3	N/A
Turnout		44,076	79.1	−2.5
Conservative gain from Labour		Swing	+28.5	

=== Elections in the 1920s ===
General election 1929: Leicester East
Party	Candidate	Votes	%	±%
Labour	Frank Wise	22,533	50.8	+1.5
Unionist	John Loder	13,801	31.1	−19.6
Liberal	Frederick Lawson	8,054	18.1	N/A
Majority		8,732	19.7	N/A
Turnout		44,388	81.6	+2.0
Registered electors		54,364		
Labour gain from Unionist		Swing	+1.6	

General election 1924: Leicester East
Party	Candidate	Votes	%	±%
Unionist	John Loder	16,090	50.7	+22.7
Labour	George Banton	15,669	49.3	+4.5
Majority		421	1.4	N/A
Turnout		31,759	79.6	+3.5
Registered electors		39,906		
Unionist gain from Labour		Swing	+9.1	

General election 1923: Leicester East
Party	Candidate	Votes	%	±%
Labour	George Banton	13,162	44.8	−2.9
Unionist	Arthur Evans	8,247	28.0	N/A
Liberal	James Henderson-Stewart	7,998	27.2	−25.1
Majority		4,915	16.8	N/A
Turnout		29,407	76.1	−0.8
Registered electors		38,658		
Labour gain from Liberal		Swing	+11.1	

General election 1922: Leicester East
Party	Candidate	Votes	%	±%
National Liberal	Arthur Evans	15,164	52.3	N/A
Labour	George Banton	13,850	47.7	+20.6
Majority		1,314	4.6	N/A
Turnout		29,014	76.9	+11.3
Registered electors		37,749		
National Liberal hold		Swing		

1922 Leicester East by-election
Party	Candidate	Votes	%	±%
Labour	George Banton	14,062	52.9	+25.8
National Liberal	Albert E. Marlow	8,710	32.7	−40.2
Liberal	Ronald Wilberforce Allen	3,825	14.4	N/A
Majority		5,352	20.2	N/A
Turnout		26,597	71.3	+5.7
Registered electors		37,319		
Labour gain from National Liberal		Swing	+33.0	

=== Election in the 1910s ===
General election 1918: Leicester East
Party		Candidate	Votes	%
C	National Liberal	Gordon Hewart	18,024	72.9
	Labour	George Banton	6,697	27.1
Majority			11,327	45.8
Turnout			24,721	65.6
Registered electors			37,687	
	National Liberal win (new seat)			
C indicates candidate endorsed by the coalition government.

== See also ==
- List of parliamentary constituencies in Leicestershire and Rutland
