= Granby Street, Leicester =

Street in Leicester, United Kingdom

Coordinates: 52.6336°N 1.1304°W

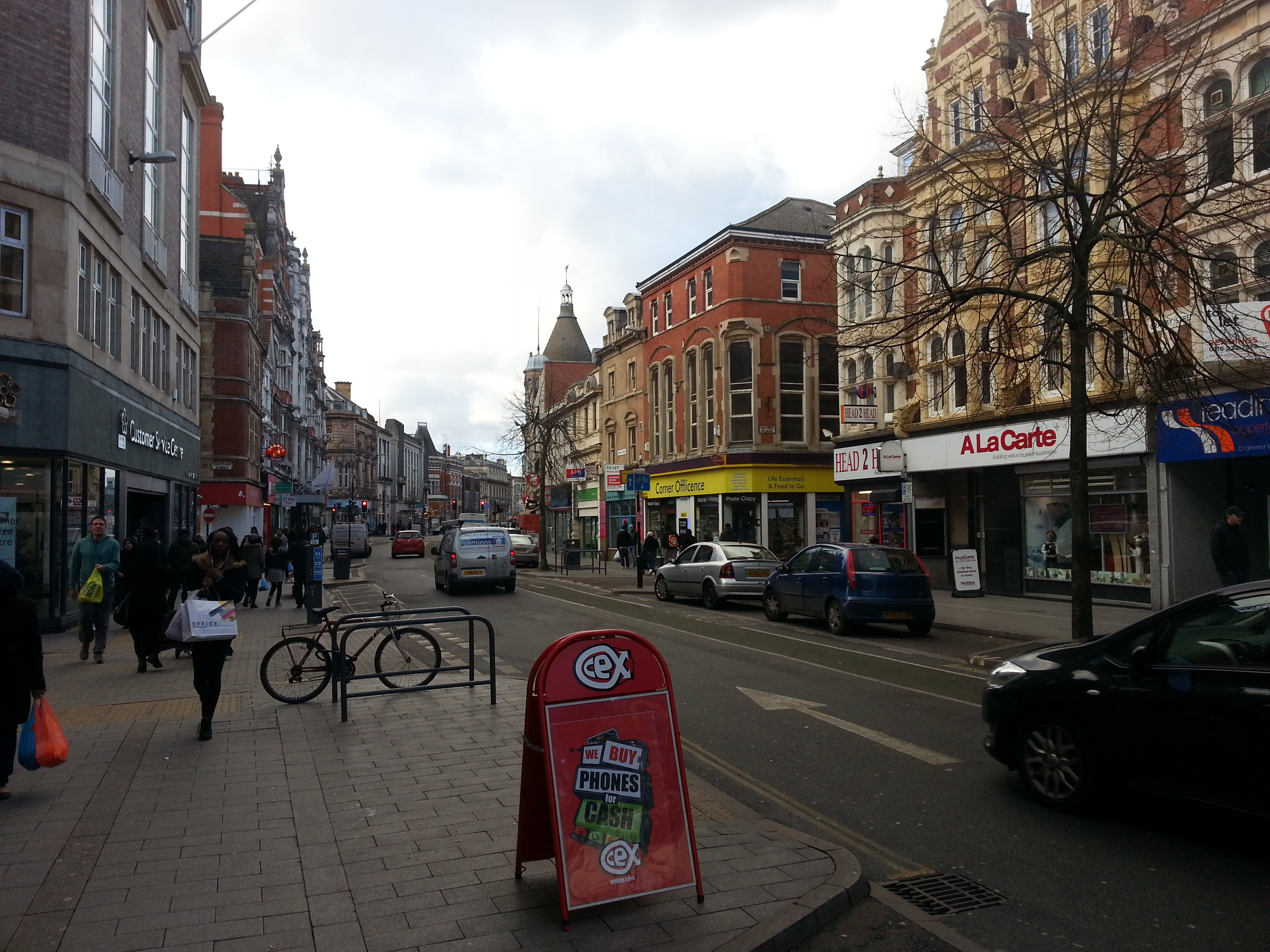
Granby Street in 2005

Granby Street is a street in the city centre of Leicester, England. It stretches from the intersection of Gallowtree Gate, Horsefair Street and Halford Street to St Georges Way. The street contains small shops, offices, financial services, restaurants, pubs and fast food outlets.

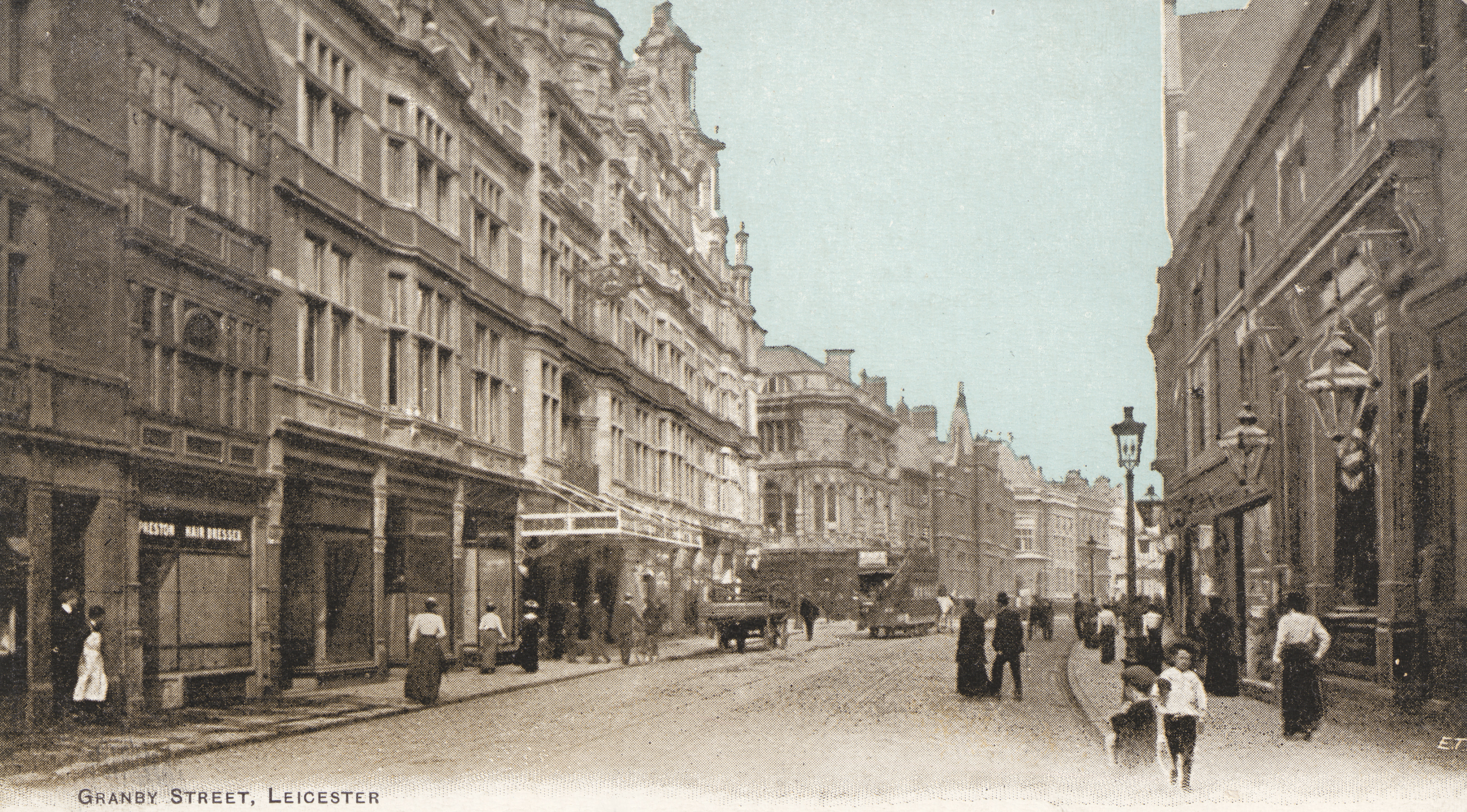
Granby Street in 1903

The street houses Leicester City Council and the Grand Hotel, built in 1898, the Turkey Cafe, and was once home to a temperance hall.

From 1901 to 1949, electric lines of two-track trams ran along Granby Street towards the Clock Tower and the train station towards Stoneygate. Granby Street is one of the oldest shopping streets, and remains a tourist destination.
