= Humberstone and Hamilton =

Electoral ward and administrative division of Leicester, England

Coordinates: 52.654°N 1.065°W

Humberstone & Hamilton

- Location within Leicestershire
- Population: 18,854 (2011)
- Unitary authority: Leicester
- Ceremonial county: Leicestershire
- Region: East Midlands
- Country: England
- Sovereign state: United Kingdom
- Post town: LEICESTER
- Postcode district: LE5
- Dialling code: 0116
- Police: Leicestershire
- Fire: Leicestershire
- Ambulance: East Midlands
- UK Parliament: Leicester East

Humberstone and Hamilton is an electoral ward and administrative division of the City of Leicester, England. It comprises the north-eastern Leicester suburbs of Humberstone, Humberstone Garden City, Hamilton and Netherhall.

== History ==
=== Name ===
The ward takes its name from the historical village of Humberstone and the modern housing estate and ancient village of Hamilton. The place-name 'Humberstone' is first attested in the Domesday Book of 1086, where it appears as 'Humerstane'. The name means 'Hunbeorht's stone'. The "Humber stone" is a granite monolith of unknown (perhaps glacial) origin that lies in a field in Hamilton. Until 1750 it had been fully exposed, but was then truncated and the remainder buried by a farmer. It was partly exposed in 1878, when it was estimated to have a volume of approximately 200 cubic feet (5.7 m^{3}) and thus weigh about 15-long-ton (15 t). It was said to line up with a stone nearby, St. John's Stone", to indicate sunrise at midsummer, or at Beltane. In the 1980s it was again partially uncovered and made accessible to the public. It was then fenced in when the Leicester north ring road was built and a sign was erected at the site, describing the stone's history.

Hamilton was named after a deserted medieval village in the civil parish of Barkby Thorpe, just outside the Leicester city boundary.

=== Medieval and later history ===
The village of Humberstone has been inhabited for many centuries. Part of the wall around St Mary's church is an original cob wall. There is also a thatched cruck cottage dating from a similar time. The oldest parts of the church are the tower and the walls of the chancel, which are medieval. The chancel windows are nineteenth century. The rest of the church was rebuilt in 1857–8 to the designs of Raphael Brandon. Inside he used locally obtained Humberstone alabaster for the carved capitals of the pillars in the nave and other details. The church contains a slab with a picture of a knight incised on it. This was from the tomb of Richard Hotoft who died in 1451.

There are two houses called "the Manor" in Main Street. One was built in the 16th century but enlarged in the 18th and had a 16th century tithe barn close to it. This barn has now been converted into a house. The other (east of the church) was built in the 18th century.,

The village's population increased during the 18th and 19th centuries and Leicester grew out towards Humberstone. At the 1821 census the population of Humberstone parish was 415. It more than doubled in the next forty years.

Humberstone had a station on the Leicester branch of the Great Northern Railway, named Humberstone Railway Station. This was on Uppingham Road to the west of the old village. It closed in 1962 having had a very limited service since 1953 which became from 1957 even more limited being restricted to summer holiday special trains. Further to the west, Humberstone Road railway station was on the Midland Main Line.This opened in 1875 and closed in 1968

Part of the parish ("West Humberstone") became part of the County Borough of Leicester in 1891 (most of this is not part of the present ward of Humberstone and Hamilton) The Corporation electric tramway reached what later became Humberstone Park in 1904. This was then on the Leicester boundary. Humberstone was a centre for framework knitting. Two large houses were built during this time: Monks Rest (the old vicarage) built during the early part of the 19th century and Humberstone Hall begun in the late 18th century and finished in the 19th century. The grounds of Monks Rest are now a park. Humberstone Hall had a drive which was an avenue of Wellingtonias, which survive in Pine Tree Avenue.

There was a Roman villa at or close to the site of the medieval village of Hamilton. Hamilton was not mentioned in Domesday Book (1086) The medieval village was a chapelry of Barkby It was abandoned in the 15th century. Its site is marked by earthworks. Sites of the village streets, the manor and probably the chapel can be picked out.

Many of the houses in Humberstone were built in the 1920s on land that used to be part of the estate of Humberstone Hall. Some of the gardens in the area bear testament to this as they still have some of the century-old orchard trees in them.

Humberstone village was annexed to the city in 1935.The Netherhall Estate was built by the local authority (Leicester City Council) 1n the 1950s and 1960s.

In the late 1980s and early 1990s several private gardens near to the old village were sold to property developers, but a combination of local hostility and a crash in the property market resulted in the land becoming disused. It has since been taken over by the council and converted into a public garden.

The name Hamilton was revived for the new housing estate built on the A563 road, east of Rushey Mead in the 1980s.

=== Humberstone Garden Suburb ===
The development of Humberstone Garden Suburb was based on the principles of the Garden city movement. Garden suburbs modified the principles of garden cities to allow for residential "garden suburbs" without the commercial and industrial components of the garden city. They were built on the outskirts of cities, in rural settings such as Humberstone.The Garden Suburb is sometimes known as the Garden City. The Leicester City Transport buses on Route 37 begun in 1938 had this name on the front.

The Humberstone Garden Suburb is notable because it is the only example in which a UK workers cooperative has created a housing cooperative and built a housing estate for its members. The Anchor Tenants Housing Association was formed in 1887 by the workers cooperative of the Anchor Boot and Shoe Co-operative Society which was a cooperatively run boot and shoe works in Asfordby Street, Leicester. The members of the cooperative contributed a percentage of their wages and bought a plot of land just outside Leicester by the village of Humberstone and built 97 houses. The first houses were in use by 1908 and the Anchor employees were let houses by the association at a rent that was collected to cover the upkeep of the properties. The original houses were designed by George Hern in a roughcast cottage style at a density of seven to eight houses an acre. The suburb consists of houses in Lilac Avenue, Laburnum Road, Fern Rise, Chestnut Avenue and a part of Keyham Lane. The names of the new streets were chosen to emphasise the garden nature of the scheme.

== Geography ==
Humberstone and Hamilton is bordered by the wards of Rushey Mead to the north, Charnwood to the west and Coleman and Thurncourt to the south. The ward borders the county of Leicestershire; in particular, the borough of Charnwood to the north and the district of Harborough to the east.

The ward comprises the suburb of Humberstone in the west, Netherhall in the southeast and Hamilton to the northeast (which makes Hamilton the most northeasterly suburb of Leicester).

== Demographics ==
Humberstone & Hamilton had a population of 11,893 at the 2001 census. The ward had a relatively older population, with the greatest share of the area's residents being between the ages of 30 and 59.

Compared to some Leicester wards, Humberstone & Hamilton's Asian population was a minority at 19%, with a 73% white British population.

In 2011 however, 43.8% of the population of this ward were White British, 40.1% were Asian and 4.4% Black.

== Amenities and facilities ==
Until the mid-1980s Humberstone village had two pubs, The Humberstone which in 1963 replaced The Plough which stood closer to the road and contained the old village lock-up) and The Windmill (which lay derelict until the late 1990s when it was demolished). The Humberstone closed in 2020 at the time of the Covid epidemic. The village is also home to two members' clubs, the Humberstone Royal British Legion and the Old Humberstone Constitutional Club.

The original public library was on Main Street - a small building on the left hand side going down the hill which resembled a non-conformist chapel. This was eventually replaced by a public library situated next to the school, but was relocated to the car park of the nearby Hamilton Tesco Extra store in the mid-2000s.

Humberstone has a bowls club and a youth football club, Humberstone Rangers. There was a tennis club in the village until the mid-2000s when it was demolished and houses built there. The local golf club, Humberstone Heights, is one of the few council-run clubs in the city.

When it was built, Humberstone Garden Suburb had a bowling green, a cricket pitch, a skittle alley, a football ground, tennis courts and golf links. These facilities and the shoe factory no longer exist but the housing estate remains intact.

== Education ==
Humberstone Nursery, Infants and Junior School are located adjacent to each other in Humberstone. Humberstone Juniors converted to an academy in 2012. In 2014 Falcons Primary School opened in the area. It is a Sikh free school.

There are two primary schools in Hamilton; Kestrel's Field Primary School, which opened in the early 1990s, and Hope Hamilton, which is Church of England aided.

Orchard Mead Academy is attended by students between the ages of 11 and 16. Nearby Keyham Lodge School is an all-boys school for 11–16s with learning disabilities and behavioural problems. Gateway Sixth Form College has recently opened a building opposite the Tesco store, with a pedestrian footbridge across the outer ring road between the college and Tesco.

== Transport ==
Humberstone & Hamilton are served by the following bus companies and services: Arriva Midlands services 37, 56/56A, 58/58A, Centrebus services LC7, Orbital 40N & 40S, Hospital Hopper and First Leicester services 38/38A.

== Politics ==
Humberstone & Hamilton is part of the Leicester East constituency, a traditionally safe Labour seat. However, it is currently represented in the parliament by the Conservative Party.
