= Vista (Royal Leicestershire Rutland and Wycliffe Society for the Blind) =

Vista, previously known as The Royal Leicestershire, Rutland and Wycliffe Society for the Blind, is an English independent charity. It provides services for blind and partially sighted people of Leicester, Leicestershire and Rutland. After many years of operations, it took its current name in 2002.
