= Charnwood (ward) =

Electoral ward in Leicester, England

Coordinates: 52.650°N 1.096°W

- Population: 13,291 (2011)
- Unitary authority: Leicester
- Ceremonial county: Leicestershire
- Region: East Midlands
- Country: England
- Sovereign state: United Kingdom
- Post town: LEICESTER
- Postcode district: LE5
- Dialling code: 0116
- Police: Leicestershire
- Fire: Leicestershire
- Ambulance: East Midlands
- UK Parliament: Leicester East

Charnwood was an electoral ward and administrative division of the city of Leicester, England. The population of the ward at the 2011 census was 13,291. It comprised the northern Leicester suburb of Northfields and its Tailby and Morton ex-council estates. Northfields has had a bad reputation for criminal activities. Despite being only 3 small estates it was responsible for 30% of the crime rate within the Leicester area. In response The Northfields Project was set upin order to help to combat crime and make Northfields a safer place to live. The scheme improved areas such as security fencing, lighting and public recreational spaces.

Charnwood was bounded by the wards of Belgrave to the west and Rushey Mead to the north-west on the other side of the Midland Main Line, Humberstone & Hamilton to the east on the other side of Victoria Road East, Coleman to the south-east at The Portway and North Evington to the south at Hastings Road. The Troon Industrial Area and Estate is to the north on the other side of Gipsy Lane.

Northfields was named for one of three open fields that once nearly surrounded Leicester. The field was enclosed in 1764 and then used as residential building land 'in good time for the population increase' of the industrial revolution, meaning that Leicester was largely spared the overcrowding problems typical of industrialising towns of that time.

The Charnwood ward, which was represented on Leicester City Council and covered the area, was abolished in 2015 with most of the area now being part of the Troon ward.
