= Spinney Hills =

Area of Leicester, England

Coordinates: 52.64°N 1.10°W

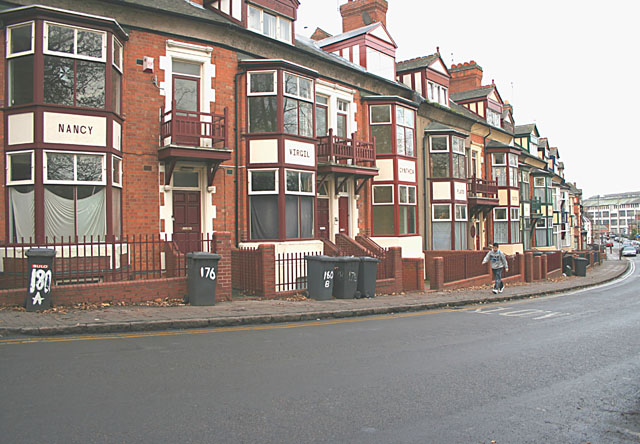
Mere Road, Spinney Hills, Leicester - geograph.org.uk - 94065

Spinney Hills is an inner city area of Leicester, England. It is situated to the north of the core Highfields area, around Spinney Hill Park. To the north is Northfields, to the east North Evington, to the west is the railway line, and to the south is the main part of Highfields. It is also a ward of the City of Leicester whose population at the 2011 census was 25,561.

== Spinney Hill Park ==
The 34-acre (14 ha) park was laid out in 1885 on a sloping site, to ensure the east side of the expanding town had access to some open parkland. The Town Council had opened Abbey Park in 1882, on the north side of Leicester; converted Victoria Park from a race course 1883; and opened Western Park in 1887, thus in five years, the expanding suburbs on all sides of the town were provided with parks and recreational amenities.

The site was bought by the town from Mr C.S. Burnaby in March 1886 for £18,000. John Burns was responsible for setting out the paths, planting and initial infrastructure, and a formal opening was performed by Mrs Hart, wife of the Mayor, Israel Hart, on 24 August of the same year.

A grant made by the Heritage Lottery Fund allowed substantial improvements to be made to the park, a new infinity garden was laid out, a new reading mound was created, the paths were upgraded, improvements were made to the stream running through the park and improvements were made to the seating and furniture.

== Conservation area ==
In 1982 the area encompassing the whole of the park, plus properties that face onto it was designated as the 'Spinney Hills Park Conservation Area'. The Conservation Area also includes an extension south along Mere Road, and the buildings around the Mere Road/Hartington Road/St Saviours Road junction at the north-west corner. The Conservation area was granted 'Article 4' status in 1983, which requires planning permission for all alterations to houses, such as replacement of windows, doors or re-roofing. The aim of the conservation area is to retain and enhance the distinctive and characteristic attributes of the area, and to avoid unsympathetic alterations.

With the inclusion of the Spinney Hills area within the town boundary in 1892, house building in the area progressed at a great rate. The plots fronting the park commanded a particular status, and the houses were accordingly larger and more varied than those in surrounding streets. It is these properties, mostly built between 1890 and 1910, and their visual relationship to the parkland, that are the particular spur for planning protection.
