= North Evington =

Area of Leicester, England

Coordinates: 52.636°N 1.093°W

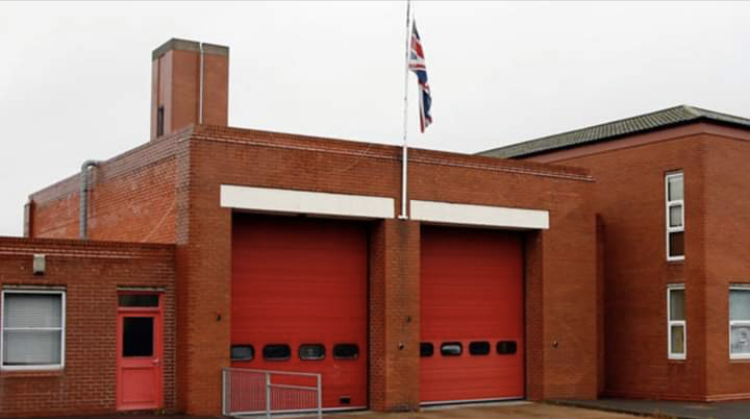
- Eastern Fire Station, Hastings Road

- Location within Leicestershire
- Population: 19,094
- Unitary authority: Leicester
- Ceremonial county: Leicestershire
- Region: East Midlands
- Country: England
- Sovereign state: United Kingdom
- Post town: LEICESTER
- Postcode district: LE5
- Dialling code: 0116
- Police: Leicestershire
- Fire: Leicestershire
- Ambulance: East Midlands
- UK Parliament: Leicester East

North Evington is an area, suburb, electoral ward and administrative division of the city of Leicester, in the ceremonial county of Leicestershire, England.

North Evington is bordered by Belgrave to the west, Charnwood to the north, Evington and Humberstone & Hamilton to the east and Spinney Hills to the south. It is an inclusion of Highfields. It is in the eastern part of the city.

The area contains Leicestershire and Rutland Fire and Rescue Service’s Eastern Station on Hastings Road, Spence Street Swimming Baths and the Merlyn Vaz Walk In and Health Centre.

The development was originally in the parish of Evington, disconnected from the village itself. The areas in between have since been infilled. It has been absorbed by the urban district of Highfields which is predominantly a working class area with rows of Victorian terraces to satisfy the needs of workers.

The area was designed and constructed as a suburb by Arthur Wakerley from the 1880s onwards. By the First World War the area was entirely developed. The area, which was originally outside the borough boundary, was annexed to the borough of Leicester in 1892.

In September 2022 the area saw widespread unrest between Hindu and Muslim communities. In a Leicester City Council byelection the Conservatives took 49.6% of the vote with a 32.7-point swing. Labour, the incumbent party came third in the vote.

== Civil parish ==
North Evington became a parish in 1892, it was abolished on 26 March 1896 to form Leicester. In 1891 the parish had a population of 4173.

== Gallery ==
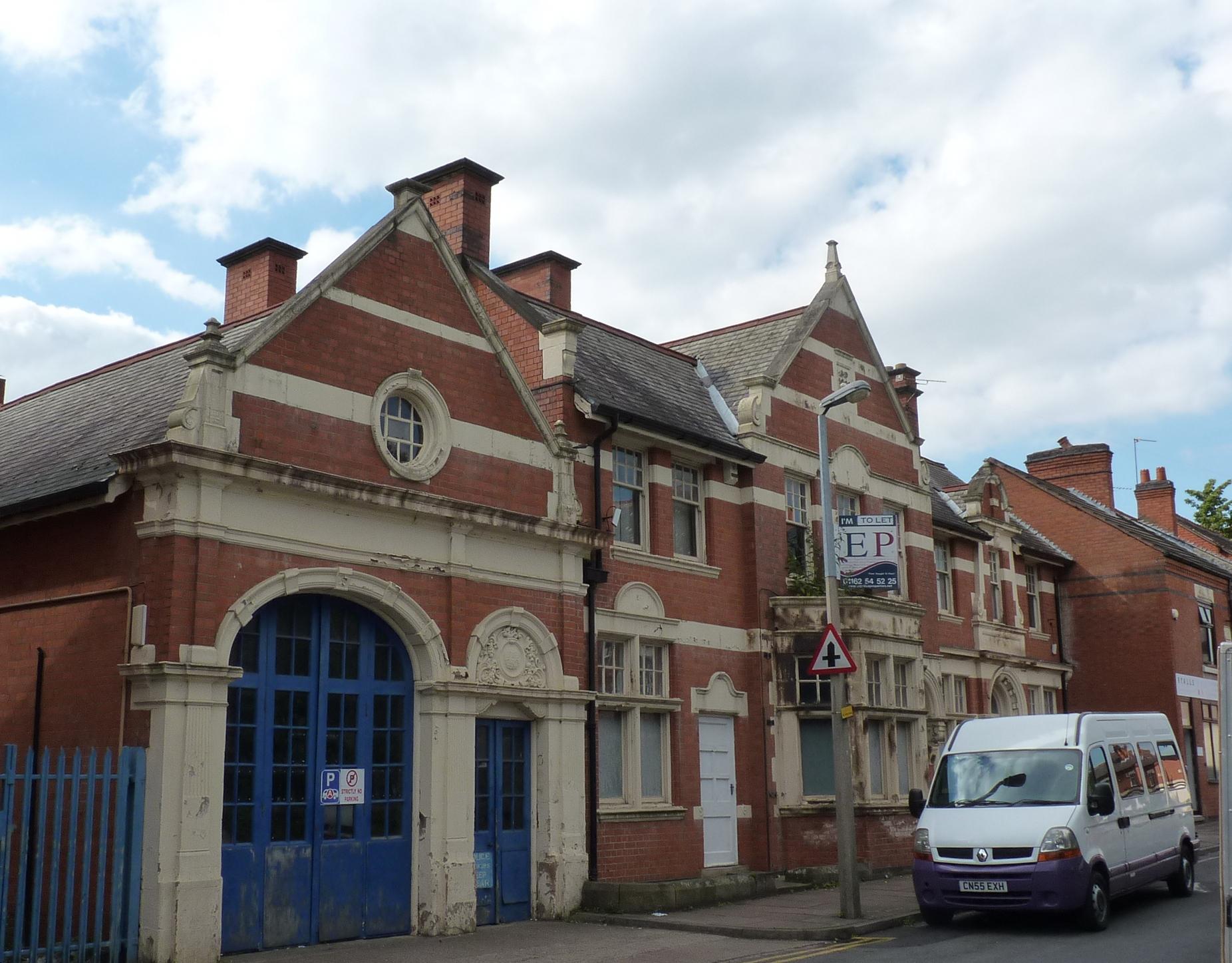
Asfordby St Police station (now closed)

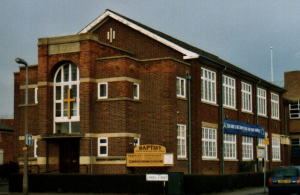
North Evington Church

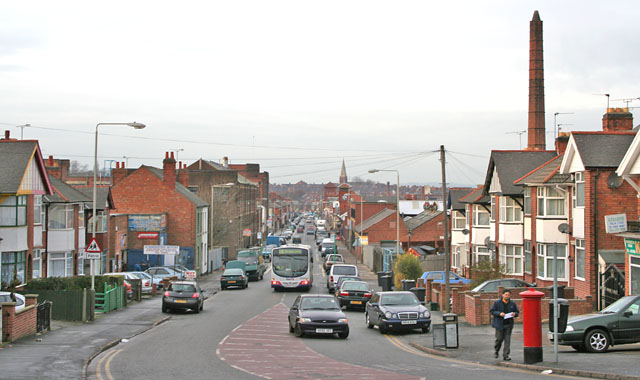
St Saviours Road
