= Evington =

Area of Leicester, England

Coordinates: 52.628°N 1.074°W

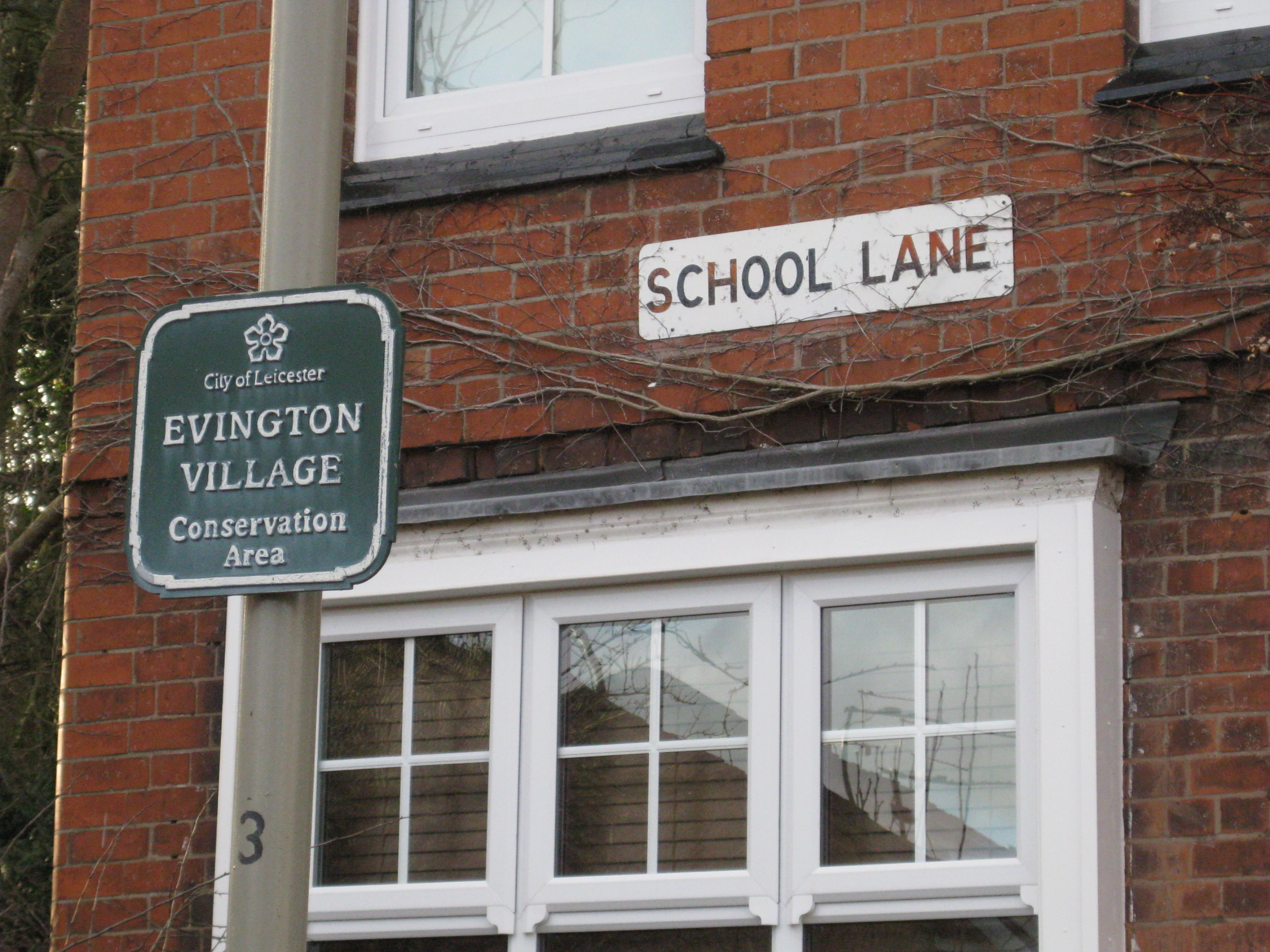
- Evington Village Conservation Area

- Population: 17,268 (2021)
- OS grid reference: SK628030
- Unitary authority: Leicester
- Ceremonial county: Leicestershire
- Region: East Midlands
- Country: England
- Sovereign state: United Kingdom
- Post town: LEICESTER
- Postcode district: LE5
- Dialling code: 0116
- Police: Leicestershire
- Fire: Leicestershire
- Ambulance: East Midlands
- UK Parliament: Leicester East Leicester South

Evington is an area of Leicester, and electoral ward of the Leicester district, in the ceremonial county of Leicestershire, England. It used to be a small village centred on Main Street and the Anglican church of St Denys but was close enough to Leicester to become one of the outer suburbs in the 1930s. Today, the ward comprises the historical village of Evington, as well as the modern ex-council estates of Rowlatts Hill and Goodwood. The population of the ward at the 2021 census was 17,268.

== History ==
=== Evington village ===
The name Evington comes from the Old English meaning 'farm/settlement of Eafa/Aefa'. After the Norman Conquest of 1066 the land was given to Hugh de Grentesmesnil. The first known spelling of Evington was by Walter de Evington in 1259, who leased a carucate of land at the village of Evington – about 100 acres (0.40 km^{2}). The parish of Evington was originally quite large and included the areas now known as North Evington and Evington Valley. These were annexed by the borough of Leicester in 1892, and are not generally considered part of Evington.

In 1931 the parish had a population of 1802. On 1 April 1935, the boundaries of Leicester (by this point a city), were expanded again, including nearly all of the remaining parish of Evington, except for a small part which went to Oadby. The modern ward does include the large 1950s development based at Downing Drive and Spencefield Lane.

Evington village has been a conservation area since 1989.

=== Council estates ===
Rowlatts Hill is a council estate established on a hillside to the north of Leicester General Hospital in 1964–67 by the City Architect Stephen George with two 22-story blocks of flats and single or two-storey houses of grey brick. A later development (1973–77) is of red brick houses. For council housing purposes it is considered separate from Evington.

Goodwood is a 1950s council estate considered together with Evington for council housing purposes. It is just under 1000 residences.

== Features ==
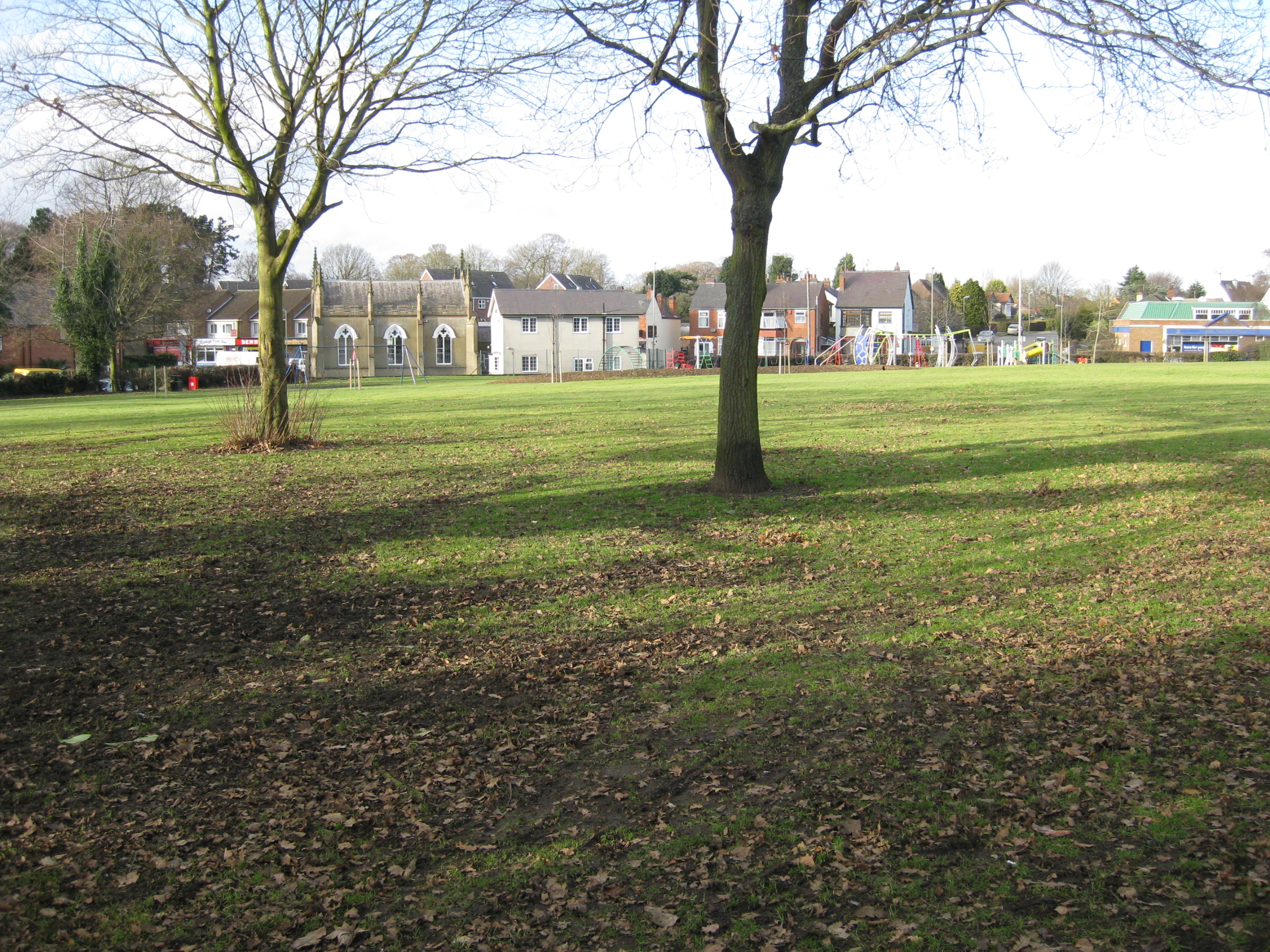
Evington Village Green

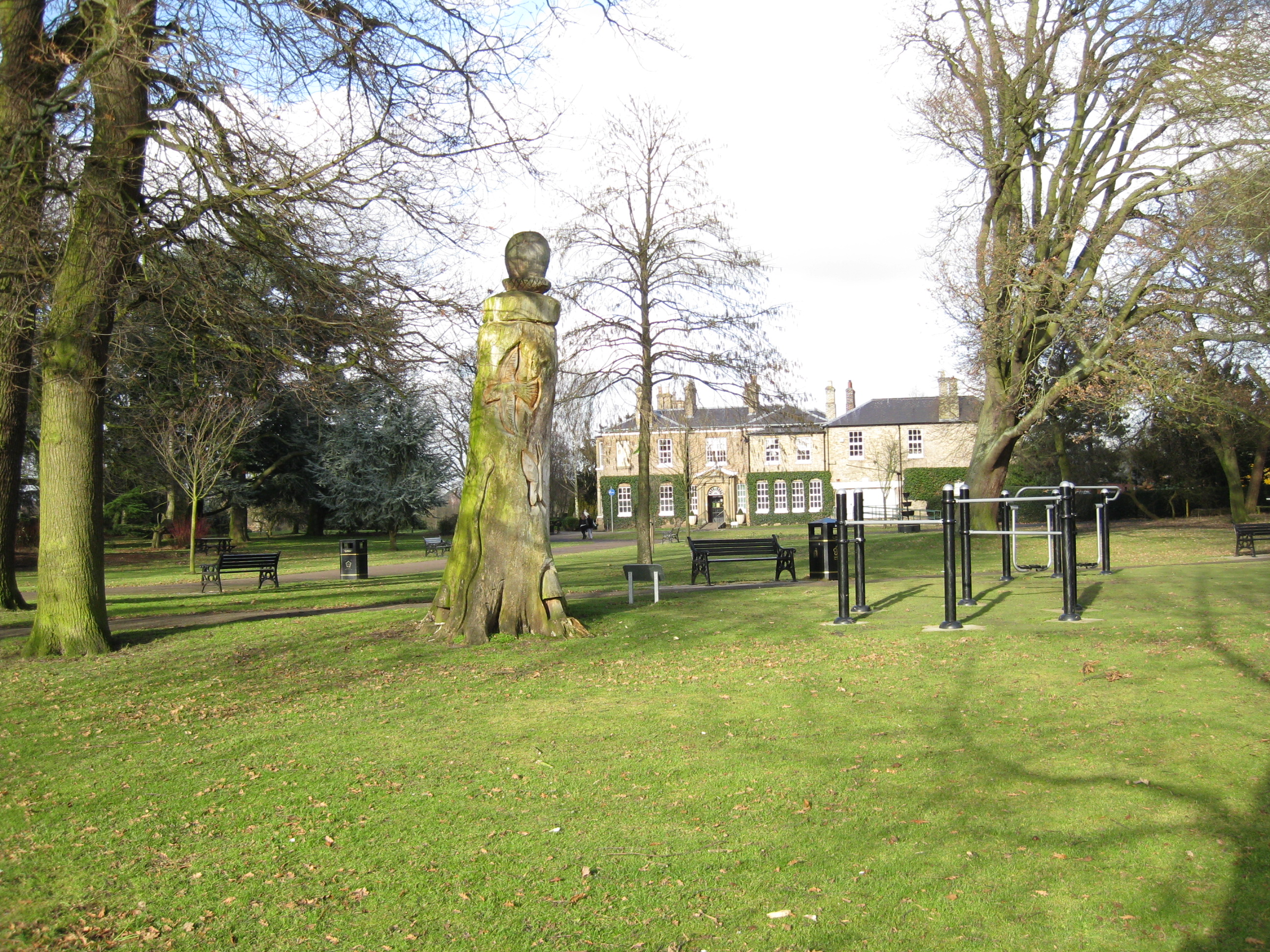
Evington Park

=== Village Green ===
Evington Village Green is a triangle of land bounded to the north by Main Street, on the Southwest by High Street and to the east by Church Street. The village war memorial is located on the northeast corner. On the west corner is a Baptist Chapel and a building called the Manse. It is largely open space for recreation, with a large old oak tree in the south-east corner. It also features a newly refurbished children's playground, funded by the Friends of Evington Village Green. It is the site of the Evington Village Fete and Show, held annually.

=== Evington Park ===
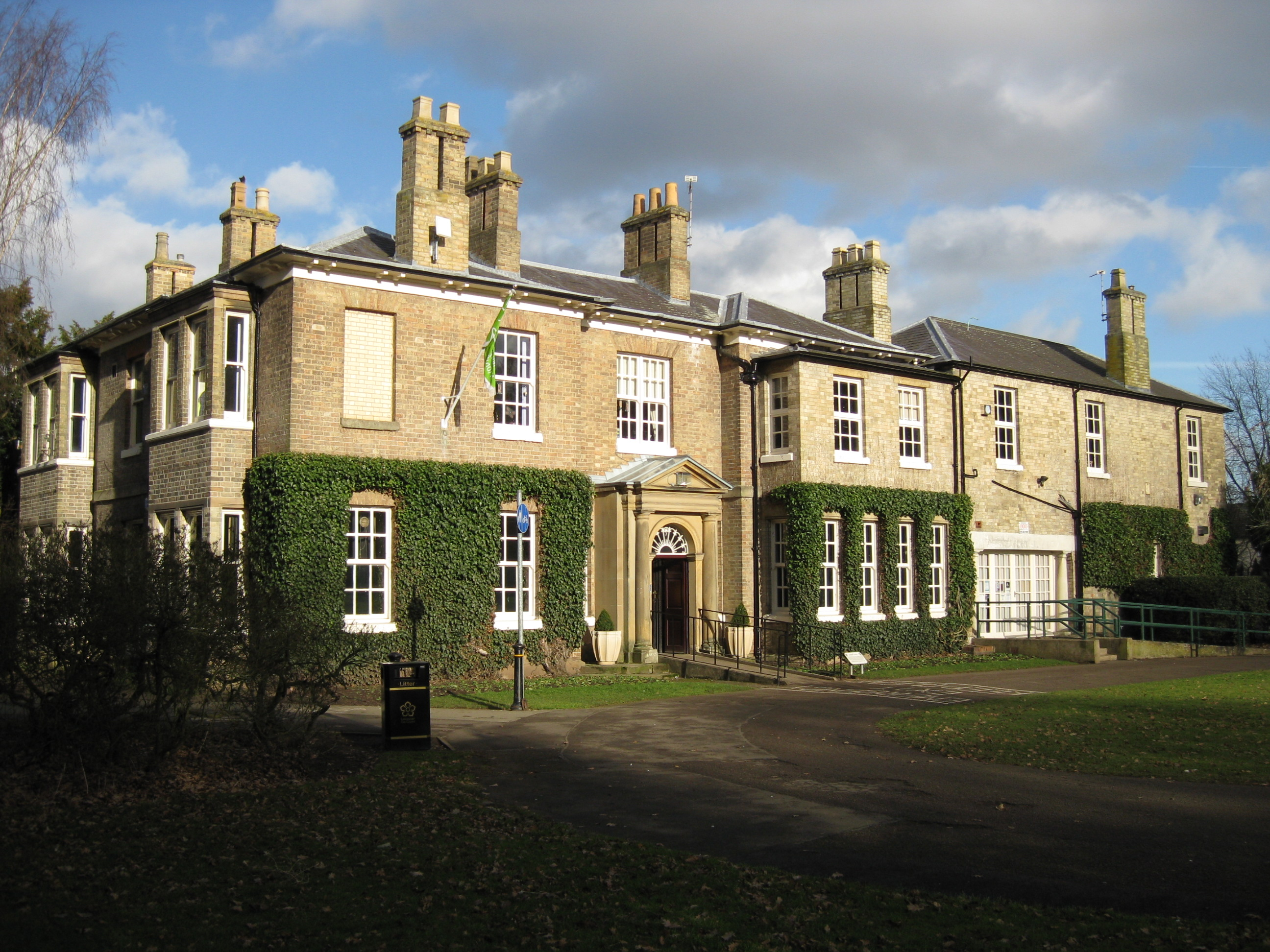
Evington House

Evington park is some 44 acres (0.18 km^{2}) of public parkland, opened in 1948, formerly the estate of Evington House (built 1836) which is used as offices and some public amenities. It contains many mature trees, including a mulberry dating from about the same time as the house. There are public exercise machines as well as tennis courts, football and cricket pitches and bowling greens. More recently, a concrete table tennis table has been added and is situated near the tennis courts. Public toilets have also been built near the courts.

=== Arboretum ===
This was established as a public amenity in 1970 and consists of an area south of St Denys Church, bounded on the west by a golf course, with more than 500 trees largely planted in taxonomic groups. In the northmost area, many individual trees are planted by arrangement with the council as memorials to people who have died.

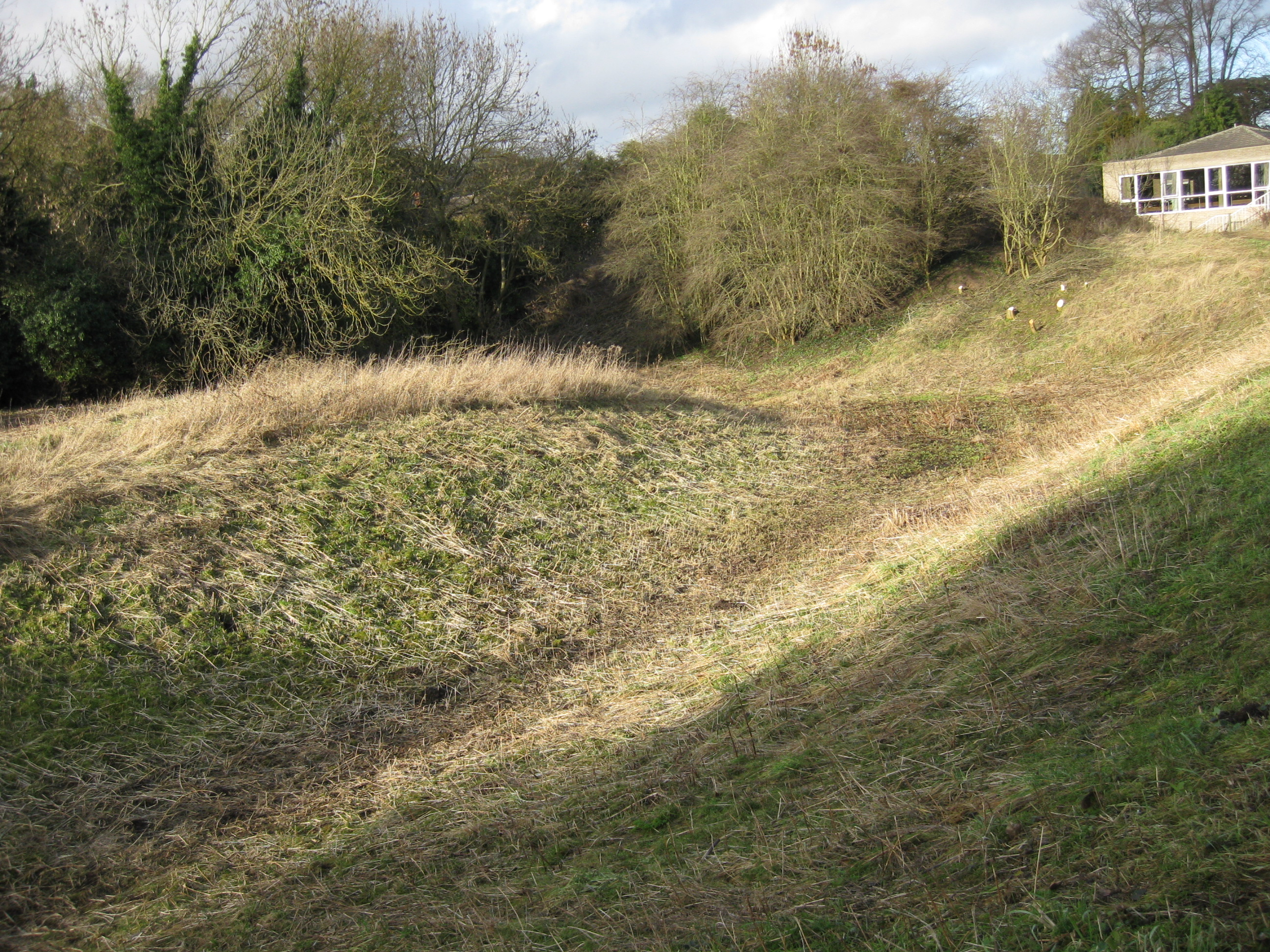
Piggy's Hollow

=== The Hollow ===
This is Scheduled monument (SM17026), often known as 'Piggy's Hollow', consisting of the remains of the moats of a manor house built in the late 13th century by John de Grey. It is on the north side of the Arboretum and adjacent to St Denys Church on the west.

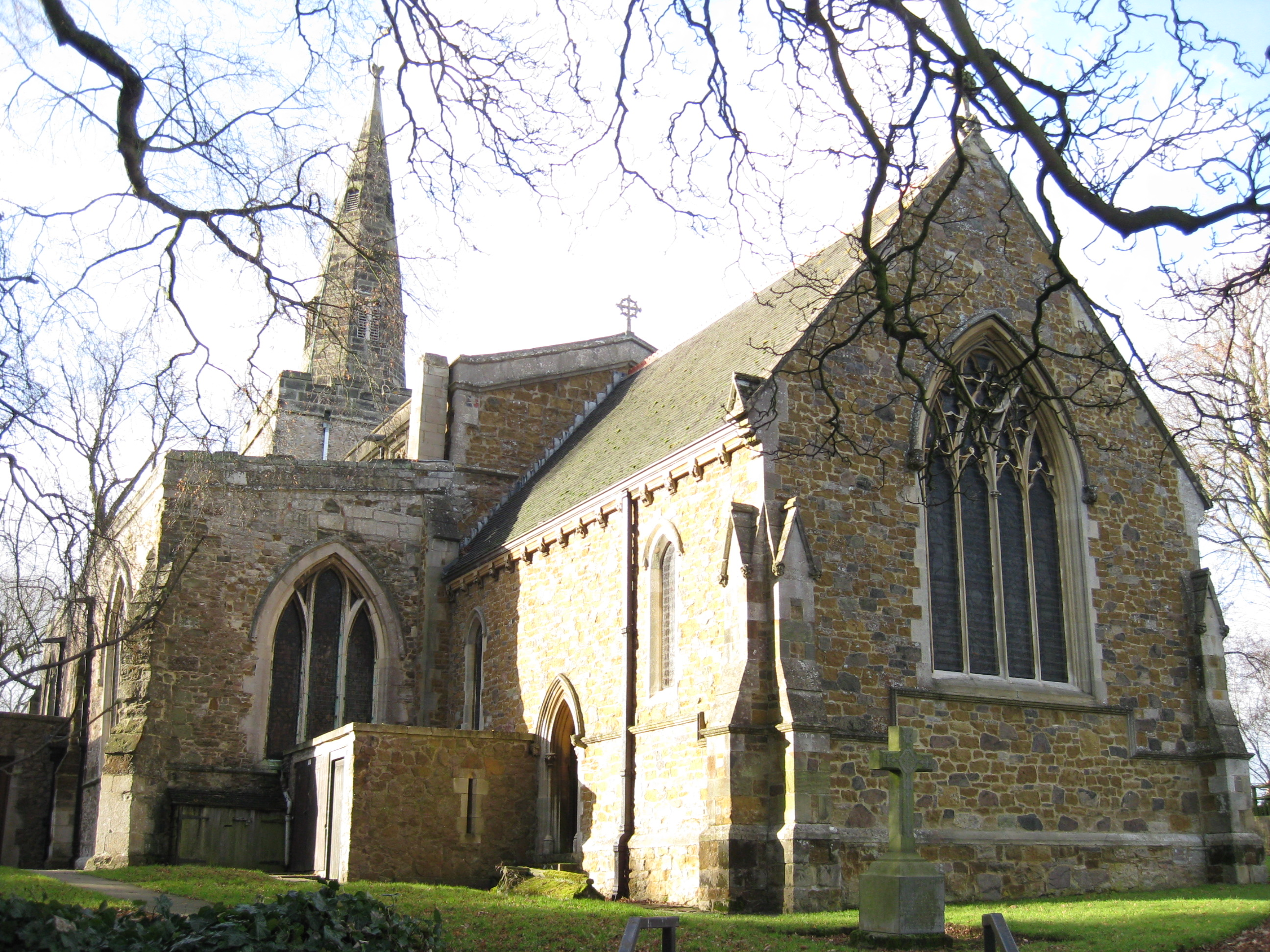
St Denys parish church

=== St Denys Church ===
The Church of England church of St Denys has been the parish church for almost 800 years, having been dedicated on 9 October 1219 by the Bishop of Lincoln. It is a Grade II* listed building. The tower and spire are original: the South and North Aisles date from the 14th century, and the Chancel from the 19th century. Its rare ring of 4 bells was augmented to six following an appeal in the late 1980s. The interior includes 3 stained glass windows from 1870.

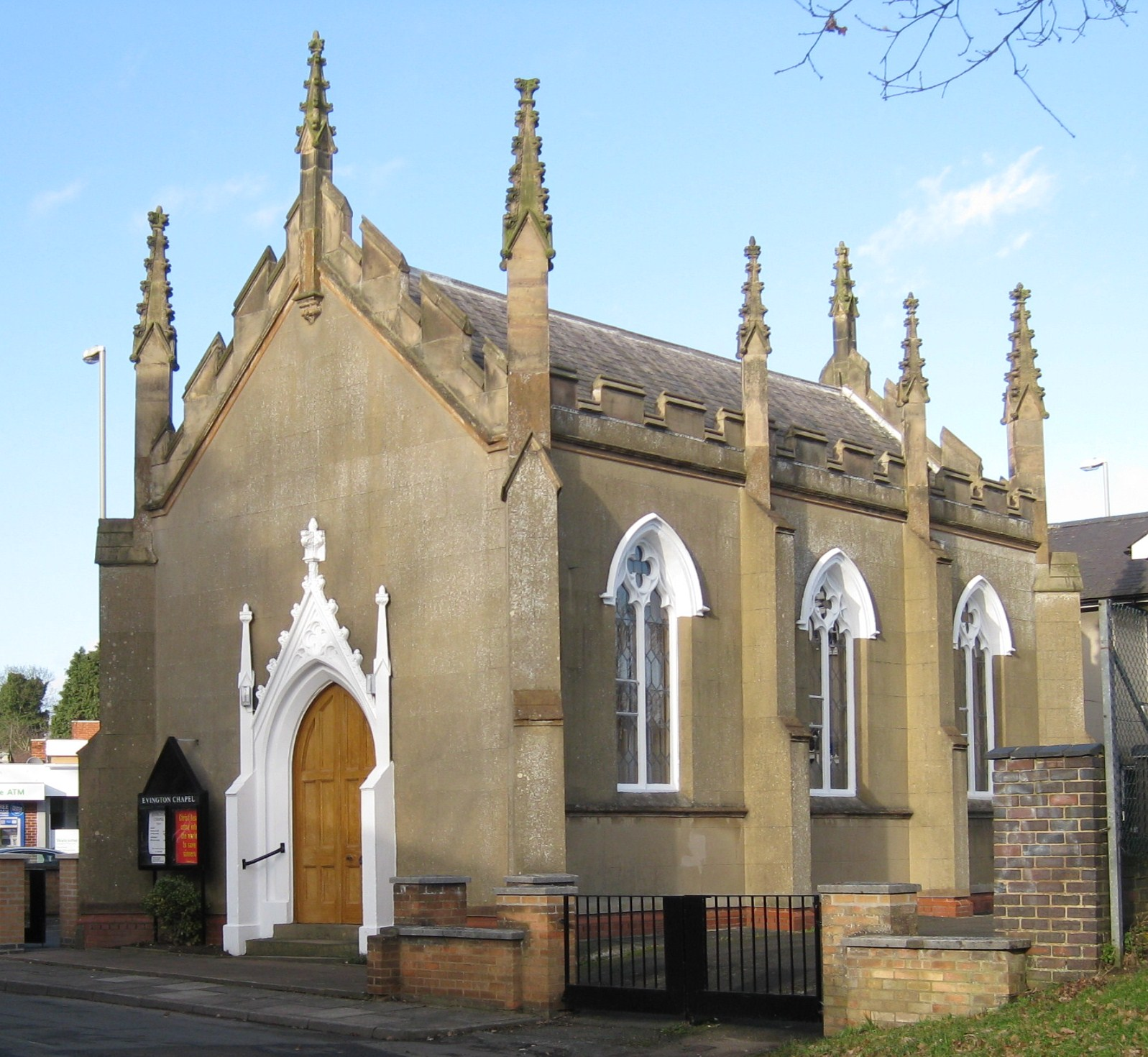
Evington Chapel

=== Evington Chapel ===
Evington Chapel is a Baptist Church on the corner of Main Street and High Street, by Evington Village Green. It is an 1837 Gothic style building with slate roof, and a Grade II listed building.

=== Masjid Umar Mosque ===
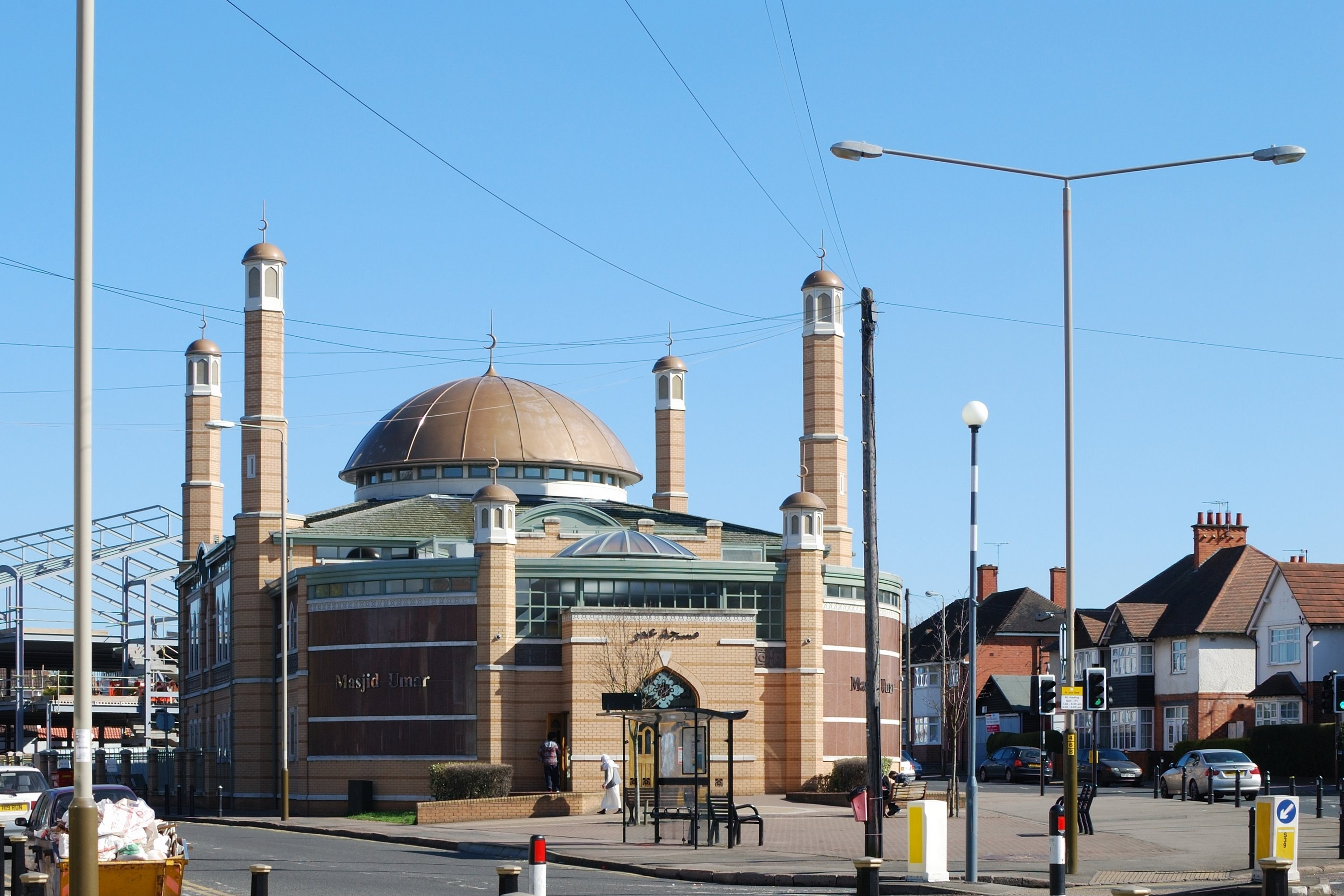
Masjid Umar Mosque

The Masjid Umar mosque, which is also Evington Muslim Centre, was completed in 2000.

== Amenities ==
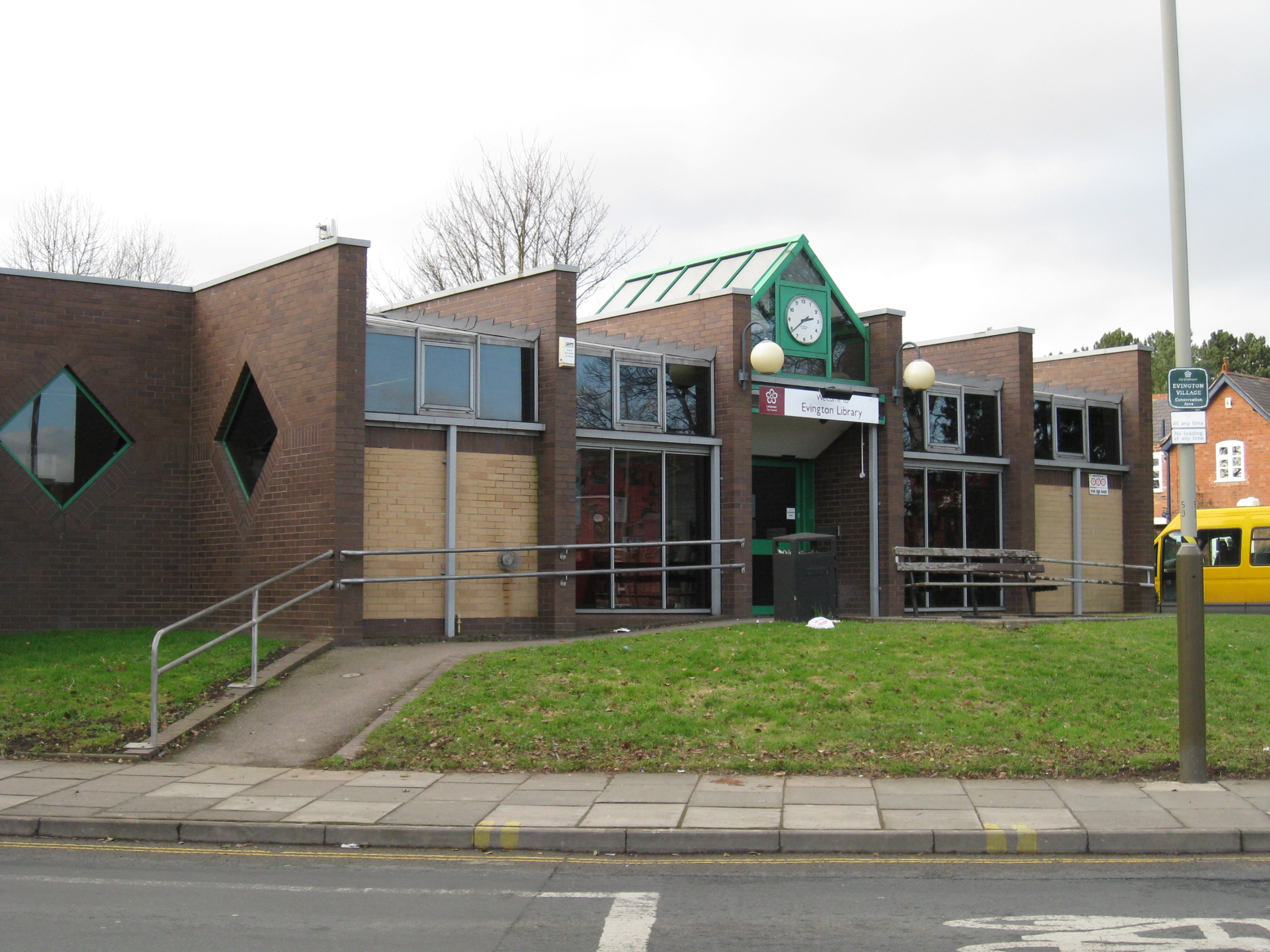
Evington Library

Evington has two main shopping centres: the first largely based in a modern development near the old village and including the local library, and the second towards the northern end of Downing Drive. Public houses include the Cedars in the old village and the Dove in Downing Drive. The Village Hall is a brick building on Church Lane, opposite St Denys: its foundation stone calls it King George V Hall and is dated MDCDXII (1912).

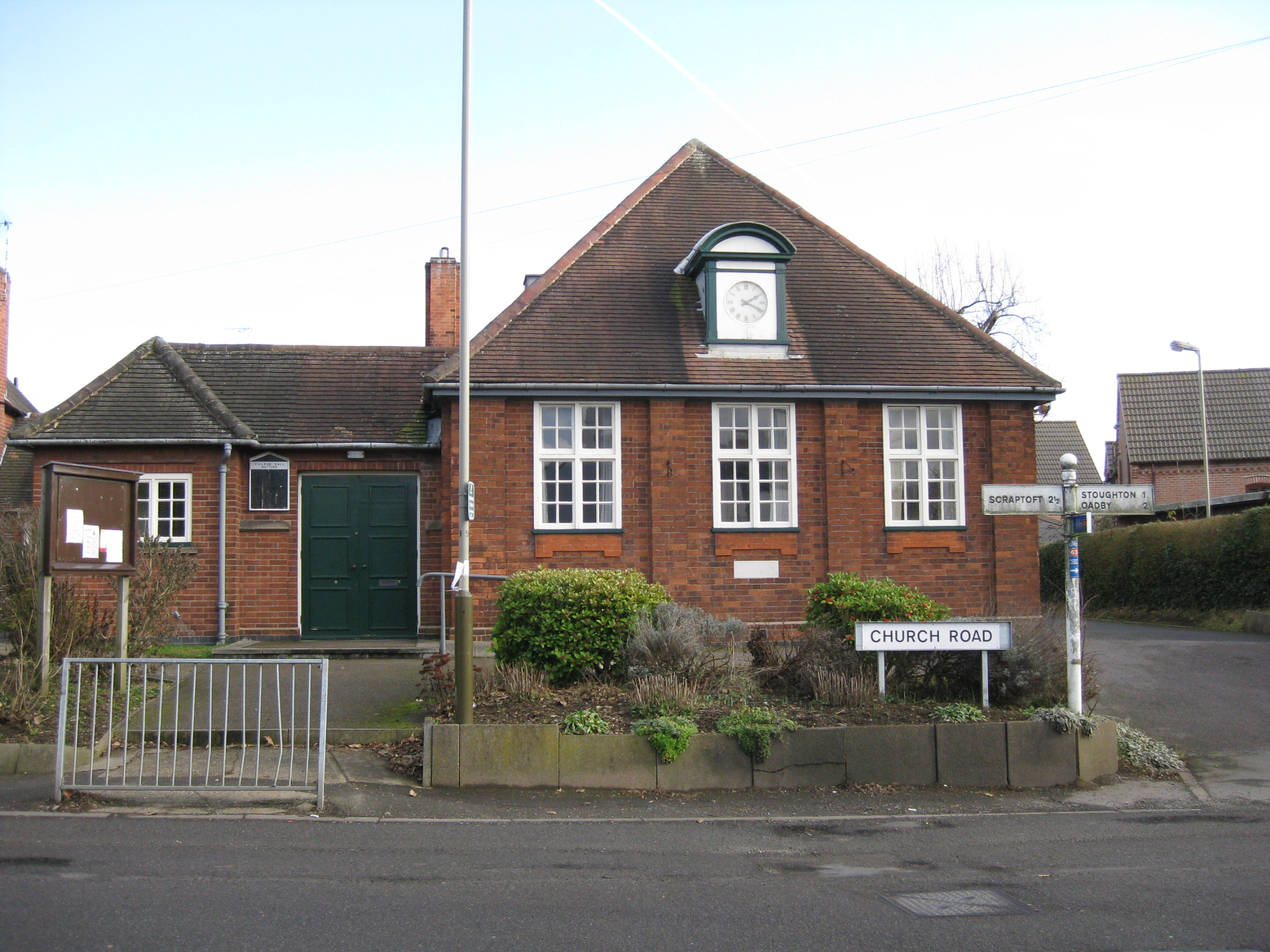
Evington Village Hall

Nearby places, Goodwood, Evington Valley, Oadby, Thurnby, Stoughton.

Evington is home to the Leicestershire Golf Club, on the south of the village, and west of the arboretum.

The largest employer in the area is the Leicester General hospital, located near Goodwood on Coleman Road which is south of Uppingham Road (the A47).

The Evington Echo is the community newspaper. It is produced by volunteers and is delivered free of charge to 5,800 houses in the area. It was first published in 1981.

=== Schools in the area ===
Primary schools: Linden Primary School, Evington Valley Primary School, Whitehall Primary School, Oaklands (Special School), Coleman Primary School, Krishna Avanti Primary School, Leicester, Spinney Hill Primary School.

Secondary schools: City of Leicester College, St Paul's Catholic School, Judgemeadow Community College.,Madani Schools Federation.

Evington Hall is a Grade II listed building (built about 1840) which in the past was a convent school, then part of Leicester Junior Grammar School, but is now part of a Hindu faith school which opened in September 2011.

== Transport ==
Evington is served by regular buses operated by Centrebus services 22, 22A 22E & 81.

== Council election result, 2007 ==
Evington (2)
| Party | Candidate | Votes | % | ±% |
|---|---|---|---|---|
| Conservative | Michael Johnson | 1,531 | 20% | |
| Labour | Deepak Bajaj | 1,519 | 20% | |
| Conservative | Caroline Roberts | 1,425 | 19% | |
| Labour | Edward Gorrod | 1,422 | 18% | |
| Liberal Democrats | Bob Carter | 708 | 9% | |
| Liberal Democrats | Chris Garner | 506 | 7% | |
| Unity For Peace And Socialism | Mohinder Singh Farma | 283 | 4% | |
| UKIP | Bridie Duignan | 153 | 2% | |
| UKIP | Andrew Ponting | 143 | 2% | |
| Turnout | | 4,069 | | |
| Conservative hold | | Swing | | |
| Labour gain from Conservative | | Swing | | |

== People ==
Evington was the home of England football international Emile Heskey. Both Emile Heskey and Gary Lineker (winner of the Golden Boot) attended the City of Leicester College in Evington, as did former Labour media adviser Alastair Campbell and Dr Nicholas Shepherd (co-founder of the internet). Heskey and Shepherd were both pupils at Linden Primary school in Evington. What is now the Cedars public house and restaurant on the corner of Main Street and School Lane was formerly the home of the novelist E. Phillips Oppenheim. The novelist J. B. Priestley was evacuated to North Evington Hospital after being wounded in France in 1916.
