= List of schools in Leicester =

This is a list of schools in Leicester, England.

== State-funded schools ==
=== Primary schools ===
- Abbey Mead Primary Academy
- Alderman Richard Hallam Primary School
- Avanti Fields School
- Avenue Primary School
- Barley Croft Primary School
- Beaumont Lodge Primary School
- Belgrave St Peter’s CE Primary School
- Braunstone Community Primary School
- Braunstone Frith Primary School
- Bridge Junior School
- Buswells Lodge Primary School
- Caldecote Community Primary School
- Catherine Infant School
- Catherine Junior School
- Charnwood Primary School
- Christ the King RC Academy
- Coleman Primary School
- Dovelands Primary School
- Evington Valley Primary School
- Eyres Monsell Primary School
- Falcons Primary School
- Folville Junior School
- Forest Lodge Academy
- Fosse Mead Primary Academy
- Glebelands Primary School
- Granby Primary School
- Green Lane Infant School
- Hazel Community Primary School
- Heatherbrook Primary Academy
- Herrick Primary School
- Highfields Primary School
- Holy Cross RC School
- Hope Hamilton CE Primary School
- Humberstone Infant Academy
- Humberstone Junior School
- Imperial Avenue Infant School
- Inglehurst Infant School
- Inglehurst Junior School
- Kestrel Mead Primary Academy
- King Richard III Infant and Nursery School
- Knighton Mead Primary Academy
- Krishna Avanti Primary School
- Linden Primary School
- Marriott Primary School
- Mayflower Primary School
- Medway Community Primary School
- Mellor Community Primary School
- Merrydale Infant School
- Merrydale Junior School
- Montrose School
- Mowmacre Hill Primary School
- North Mead Primary Academy
- Overdale Infant School
- Overdale Junior School
- Parks Primary School
- Queensmead Primary Academy
- Rolleston Primary School
- Rowlatts Hill Primary School
- Rushey Mead Primary School
- Sacred Heart RC Academy
- St Barnabas CE Primary School
- St John the Baptist CE Primary School
- St Joseph’s RC Academy
- St Mary's Fields Primary School
- St Patrick’s RC Academy
- St Thomas More RC Academy
- Sandfield Close Primary School
- Scraptoft Valley Primary School
- Shaftesbury Junior School
- Shenton Primary School
- Slater Primary School
- Sparkenhoe Community Primary School
- Spinney Hill Primary School
- Stokes Wood Primary School
- Taylor Road Primary School
- Thurnby Mead Primary Academy
- Tudor Grange Samworth Academy
- Uplands Infant School
- Uplands Junior LEAD Academy
- Whitehall Primary School
- Willowbrook Mead Primary Academy
- Wolsey House Primary School
- Woodstock Primary Academy
- Wyvern Primary School

=== Secondary schools ===
- Avanti Fields School, Humberstone
- Babington Academy, Beaumont Leys
- Beaumont Leys School, Beaumont Leys
- Brook Mead Academy, Newfoundpool
- Castle Mead Academy, Black Friars
- City of Leicester College, Evington
- Crown Hills Community College, Crown Hills
- English Martyrs Catholic School, Beaumont Leys
- Fullhurst Community College, Braunstone
- Judgemeadow Community College, Evington
- Lancaster Academy, Knighton
- Madani Schools Federation, Evington
- Moat Community College, Highfields
- Herewood Academy , New Parks
- Orchard Mead Academy, Hamilton
- Rushey Mead Academy, Rushey Mead
- St Paul's Catholic School, Evington
- Sir Jonathan North College, Knighton
- Soar Valley College, Belgrave
- Tudor Grange Samworth Academy, A Church of England School

=== Special and alternative schools ===
- Ash Field Academy
- The Children's Hospital School
- Ellesmere College
- Keyham Lodge School
- Leicester City Primary PRU
- Leicester Partnership School
- Millgate School
- Nether Hall School
- Oaklands School
- West Gate School

=== Further education ===
- Gateway College
- Leicester College
- Wyggeston and Queen Elizabeth I College

== Independent schools ==
=== Primary and preparatory schools ===
- Al-Islamia Institute for Education
- Land of Learning Primary School
- Leicester Islamic Academy
- Leicester Preparatory School

=== Senior and all-through schools ===
- Al-Aqsa School
- Darul Uloom Leicester
- Emmanuel Christian School
- Imam Muhammad Adam Institute Boys School
- The Imam Muhammad Adam Institute School
- Jameah Academy
- Jameah Boys Academy
- Leicester High School for Girls
- St Crispin's School, Leicester
