= 2009 Special Olympics Great Britain National Games =

- Host city: Leicester
- Athletes: 2,422
- Opening: 25 July 2009
- Closing: 31 July 2009
- Main venue: Walkers Stadium
- Website: www.sol2009.com

The 2009 Special Olympics Great Britain National Games were held in Leicester between the 25 and 31 July 2009.

== Athletes and volunteers ==
Over 2,400 athletes representing 19 Special Olympics regions across the UK have visited the city of Leicester over the seven-day period along with 1,200 coaches and 1,500 volunteers.

2,422 athletes competed in 21 Olympic style competitions across the city. The city of Leicester have also recruited about 1,500 volunteers to participate in the Games.

Leicester's landscape has changed dramatically since the city first hosted the Games in 1989. From the rich diversity of its population, to the magnificent ongoing 3 billion regeneration programme, Leicester was a city rising to the challenge on many fronts.

A host of celebrities have already offered up their support to the Games next year including Martin Johnson, Gary Lineker, Leicester Tigers, Leicester City FC, and Leicestershire CCC.

== Venues ==
Walkers Stadium, home of Leicester City Football Club, was used for the Opening Ceremony and the Games Village. Sailing was held at Rutland Sailing Centre and Kayaking have taken place at the Anglian Water Site. Leicestershire County Cricket Club were used for Kwik Cricket. Other venues included Abbey Park (cycling), Braunestone Leisure Centre (swimming), New College Leicester (gymnastics), Hollywood Bowl (ten pin bowling), Saffron Lane Sports Centre (athletics) and Soar Valley College (netball).

The full list of competition venues was as follows:

Venue	Sports	Image
Ceremonies and games village	Walkers Stadium	
Athletics	Saffron Lane Sports Stadium	
Badminton	Babington Community College	
Basketball	De Montfort University	
Boccia	Shree Prajapati Centre	
Indoor Bowls	Slater Street	
Cycling	Abbey Park	
Equestrian	Abbey Park	
Football	Goals Soccer Centre and Crown Hills Community College	
Golf	Humberstone Heights Golf Course	
Gymnastics	New College Leicester	
Judo	Leicester Leys Leisure Centre	
Kayaking	Anglian Water	
Kwik Cricket	Grace Road	
Motor Activities Training Programme	Evington Leisure Centre	
Netball	Soar Valley College	
Powerlifting	Peepul Centre	
Sailing	Rutland Water	
Swimming	Braunstone Leisure Centre	
Table Tennis	Aylestone Leisure Centre	
Ten Pin Bowling	Hollywood Bowl, Meridian Leisure Park	
Tennis	Knighton Tennis Centre	

== Sports ==
The following competitions took place:

2009 Special Olympics Great Britain National Games
- Athletics
- Badminton
- Basketball
- Boccia
- Bowls
- Cycling
- Equestrian
- Football
- Golf
- Gymnastics
- Judo
- Kayaking
- Kwik cricket
- Motor activities
- Netball
- Powerlifting
- Sailing
- Swimming
- Table tennis
- Ten-pin bowling
- Tennis

== See also ==
- Special Olympics Great Britain
