= List of Roman Catholic churches in Leicester =

This is a list of Catholic churches in greater Leicester, in Leicestershire, England, which corresponds to the area of the Deanery of Leicester in terms of Catholic governance. The Deanery of Leicester falls under the Roman Catholic Diocese of Nottingham and covers the city of Leicester and its surroundings, including several communities within and without the city limits: Braunstone, New Parks, Aylestone, Eyres Monsell, Wigston, Netherhall, Rushey Mead, Beaumont Leys, Knighton, Oadby, Birstall, Rothley, Market Harborough, Husbands Bosworth, Earl Shilton, Hinckley, Market Bosworth, Lutterworth, and Narborough.

A deanery is a geographical group of parishes under the oversight of an appointed dean, which as of 2020 is the Rev. Mgr. John Hadley.

== Churches ==
Church name	Image	Location	Description	Sources
Holy Cross Priory		Wellington Street; 52.630648°N 1.130251°W	Dominican priory established in 1882, re-establishing Dominican presence in Leicester, which had existed from 1247 to 1538. The Dominicans then established local parish churches of the area. The priory church was rebuilt during 1929-58.	
Immaculate Conception		54 New Street, Oadby; 52.600844°N 1.077994°W		
Most Blessed Sacrament		Gooding Avenue, Braunstone; 52.626157°N 1.173341°W	Parish church located in Braunstone	
Mother of God		New Parks Boulevard, New Parks; 52.642455°N 1.182455°W	Parish church serving the communities of New Parks and Glenfield	
Our Lady of Good Counsel		Gleneagles Avenue, Rushey Mead; 52.661427°N 1.105495°W	A modernist church in shape and structure set in a suburban housing estate; built in 1975 based on design by Reynolds and Scott.	
Our Lady of the Rosary		Armadale Road, Netherhall; 52.648294°N 1.060517°W	Catholic parish serving Netherhall community	
Our Lady and St. Gregory		Station Road, Market Bosworth; 52.624819°N 1.407462°W		
Our Lady of Victories		1 Fairfield Road, Market Harborough; 52.477530°N 0.924803°W	1877 built, 1898 expanded. Named for 1571 Battle of Lepanto.	
Our Lady of Victories & St. Alphonsus		28 Bitteswell Road, Lutterworth; 52.458361°N 1.203011°W		
Sacred Heart		25 Mere Road, Leicester; 52.638976°N 1.107759°W	Catholic church and school; brick church structure with twin Romanesque towers, opened in December 1890.	
Sacred Heart		Mountsorrel Lane, Rothley52.716112°N 1.138055°W		
St. Anne's		Abingdon Road; 52.625928°N 1.114927°W	Catholic church operated by the Society of Pius X	
St. Edward the Confessor		633 Aylestone Road, Aylestone; 52.605873°N 1.151432°W		
St. Joseph's		Uppingham Road; 52.637070°N 1.072758°W	Catholic parish established in 1938;current church built in 1968	
St. Mary's (Ordinariate of Our Lady of Walsingham)		Theddingworth Rd., Husbands Bosworth; 52.453831°N 1.050255°W	Victorian architecture. In the park of Bosworth Hall; built in 1873 by Sir Francis Fortescue-Turville, owner of Bosworth Hall. Still an operating church, and also a Grade II* listed building. Compare to other Grade II* listings in the area. Church now in the care of the Ordinariate- https://husbandsbosworthcatholic.org.uk.	
St. Mary's and St. John Bosco		Countesthorpe Road, Wigston; Pasley Road, Eyres Monsell	Catholic parish operating out of two churches (formerly two parishes) serving the communities of Wigston, Blaby, and Countesthorpe	
St. Patrick's		Beaumont Leys Lane, Beaumont Leys; 52.658°N 1.142°W	Catholic parish dating to 1854; Romanesque-style church built in 1959	
St. Peter's		21 Hinckley Road; 52.631294°N 1.148716°W	Originally the Mission of St. Peter's, placed under care of secular clergy in 1896	
St. Peter's		Leicester Road, Hinckley; 52.543460°N 1.365477°W		
Ss. Peter and Paul		7 Melton Street, Earl Shilton; 52.574671°N 1.320357°W		
St. Pius X		52 Leicester Road, Narborough; 52.574738°N 1.200289°W	Parish established in 1965	
St. Theresa's		53 Front Street, Birstall; 52.676019°N 1.118245°W		
St. Thomas More		Knighton Road, Knighton; 52.611738°N 1.112084°W	Parish established in 1947; the church was designed and built during 1948-52. Designed in a stripped basilican style; its distinctive broad west tower is a local landmark.	

The Roman Catholic church assisted in the creation of a Polish Catholic church located on Wakerley Road in Leicester. Its parish was established in 1948 and celebrated its 70th anniversary in 2018. It was created to serve members of the Polish Armed Forces and their families in nearby military camps, and began with Dominican support by meeting within the Roman Catholic Holy Cross Priory. In the 1960s, with more than 4,000 parishioners, an effort to raise funds and secure a separate facility was undertaken, resulting in the parish assuming use of a former Methodist church on Melbourne Road.

== Former churches ==
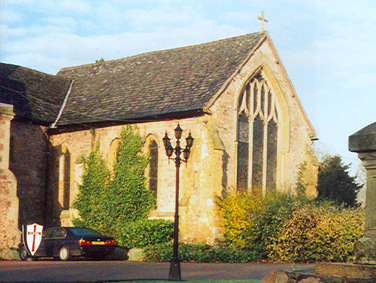
Rothley Temple

The chapel of Rothley Temple, built c.1240, associated with the Knights Templar and the Knights Hospitaller, survives as part of the Rothley Court Hotel in the village of Rothley.

Ruins of the Abbey of Saint Mary de Pratis, more commonly known as Leicester Abbey, survive, and are Grade I listed. The abbey was an Augustinian religious house, founded in the 12th century by Robert de Beaumont, 2nd Earl of Leicester, and grew to become the wealthiest religious establishment within Leicestershire. Looted and destroyed in 1645 during the English Civil War.

There was a church named St. Michael's, of one of Leicester's oldest parishes, which was demolished by about 1450. "Very little is known" about the church. It was perhaps located near what is now Vine Street and Elbow Lane. This was in the northeast part of the medieval walled town, an area which is believed to have largely depopulated after devastation in the siege of 1173.

== See also ==
- List of Roman Catholic churches in the United Kingdom
- Anglican churches in Leicester
- Roman Catholic Diocese of Nottingham
