= ISKCON schools =

Hinduism School

ISKCON schools are primary and secondary schools run by, or otherwise affiliated with, the International Society for Krishna Consciousness (ISKCON), also known as the Hare Krishna movement. ISKCON schools have been established all over the world. ISKCON schools are generally run independently, although the ISKCON Ministry of Educational Development (MED) may provide support and guidance in the establishment and running of these schools.

== Schools by region ==
=== Europe ===
==== Avanti Schools Trust ====
A number of schools are operated by the Avanti Schools Trust under the direction of the I-Foundation, a Hindu and Hare Krishna charity established to provide religious authority in the governance of state-funded Hindu faith schools in the United Kingdom. These include the Krishna Avanti Primary School, Harrow, the first state-funded Hindu school in UK, Krishna Avanti Primary School, Leicester the second state funded Hindu school in UK. Avanti schools follow the standard national curriculum of the UK school system. Avanti schools additionally feature inclusive religious education, ethics and philosophy instruction, meditation and yoga practice, and Sanskrit language instruction. Primary objectives of Avanti schools are to promote "educational excellence, character formation and spiritual insight."

==== Bhaktivedanta Manor School ====
Bhaktivedanta Manor School (now known as Gurukula-The Hare Krishna Primary School) is a school based near Bhaktivedanta Manor in the UK.

==== Sri Prahlad Gurukula ====
Sri Prahlad Gurukula, is a school in Hungary.

==== Bhaktivedanta Gurukula ====
Bhaktivedanta Gurukula, is a school in Moscow, Russia. The school educates Hare Krishna devotee children as well as those who do not have a Hare Krishna spiritual background.

=== North America ===
==== Bhaktivedanta Academy ====
Bhaktivedanta Academy, named for ISKCON Founder-Acarya A.C. Bhaktivedanta Swami Prabhupada, is a primary and secondary school in Alachua, Florida. The school is a Montessori school and in the process of gaining approval to become an IB World School that is authorized by the International Baccalaureate Organisation (IBO) to offer IB academic programs.

==== TKG Academy ====
TKG Academy, named for Tamala Krishna Goswami, is a non-sectarian, co-educational school in Dallas, Texas. The academy features Montessori Preschool, Lower Elementary, Middle Elementary, and Upper Elementary academic programs, as well as spiritual programs such as a Morning Sadhana Class and a Spiritual Friday program for students. The spiritual program is taken from that of ISKCON temples worldwide, as established by ISKCON Founder-Acarya Srila Prabhupada.

==== MathEcoSpirit Academy ====
MathEcoSpirit Academy is a school in Carriere, Mississippi. The school was founded by Dr. Héctor Rosario, who holds a PhD in Mathematics Education from Columbia University, and his wife. The school opened 2013 as an initiative to provide holistic education with a special focus on math and science education, ecology, and spirituality.

The curriculum includes instruction in math, science, language arts, language immersion, philosophy and theology, and character formation. Languages currently taught include Sanskrit and Spanish, with plans to include options to study Hindi, Bengali, Latin, and Greek as modern and ancient languages. Arts and crafts, farming, meditation, and yoga practice are also a part of the student schedule at the academy.

=== South America ===
==== Bhaktivedanta International School ====
Bhaktivedanta International School, is a primary school in Lima, Peru.

==== Escola Bhakti ====
Escola Bhakti ("Bhakti School" in the Portuguese language) is a government-approved primary and secondary school, as well as a socio-educational philanthropic institution, in Brazil which offers education free of charge to students. The school is run by ISKCON devotee volunteers. The school curriculum is based on the Mayapur Academy Gurukula curriculum.

=== Asia ===
==== The Bhaktivedanta Academy Gurukula Sri Dham Mayapur ====
The Bhaktivedanta Academy is a gurukula in Sridham Mayapur. It is a traditional Vedic School. Mission Statement: “To provide a facility for the Academy’s members to study, practice, and disseminate the teachings of Śrīmad-Bhāgavatam, along with corollary studies of the standard works of the Gauḍīya Vaiṣṇava ācāryas and the branches of Vedic philosophy, culture, and science in the context of Śrīmad-Bhāgavatam and Śrīla Prabhupāda’s teachings.”

==== Sri Mayapur International School ====
Sri Mayapur International School (SMIS) is a primary and secondary school in Mayapur, India. The school follows the United Kingdom international school curriculum, and students sit for the Cambridge International Examinations, including the IGCSE and A-levels. Students at the school have done well in the international exams.

==== Bhaktivedanta National School, Mayapur ====
The Bhaktivedanta National School is running under the Sri Dham Mayapur Township Trust. It is affiliated to the Central Board of Secondary Education (CBSE), and offers a good education that is open not only to devotee children, but to the local children of the surrounding communities at an affordable price.

==== Bhaktivedanta Gurukula and International School ====
Bhaktivedanta Gurukula and International School (BGIS) is a boarding school for boys in Vrindavan, India. Students sit for the Indian Certificate of Secondary Education examinations. Amar Ujala, one of the largest Hindi language newspapers in India, ranked the school as the top school in the Mathura district, and the second best school in the state of Uttar Pradesh, in education. The school made appearance as 13th rank boarding school in Education World Magazine's top 25 Boy's boarding school in India and 1st in Uttar Pradesh.

Bhaktivedanta University

Bhaktivedanta University is a proposed university in Vrindavan, India.

=== Australia and New Zealand ===
==== Bhaktivedanta Swami Gurukula ====
Bhaktivedanta Swami Gurukula is a registered, independent primary and secondary school located in New South Wales, Australia. The school curriculum includes learning activities in English, mathematics, science, technology, personal development, health and physical education, human society and its environment, creative arts (visual arts, music, and drama), Krishna conscious studies, foreign language, and school sport.

==== Hare Krishna School ====
Hare Krishna School is a state integrated primary school in New Zealand. In addition to the standard New Zealand curriculum, the school teaches Sanskrit language, Vedic scriptures, Indian musical instruments, and character education. The school curriculum features spirituality and values, thinking skills, English, mathematics, scripture study, Sanskrit language, social studies, technology, sciences, computer skills, art, dance, drama, music, health and physical education, with Krishna conscious practices, philosophy, and values in the centre of education.

=== Africa ===
==== Lord Krishna's Academy ====
Lord Krishna's Academy, is a school located in Accra, Ghana. The school is run by Srivas Dasa, a disciple of Bhakti Tirtha Swami.

==== Nimai International School ====
Nimai International School, is a school located in Port Harcourt, Nigeria.

== Child protection ==
ISKCON previously operated a number of gurukula boarding schools, aiming to establish institutions of education according to the traditional Vedic model. From the late 1970s, allegations of child abuse by select members of certain ISKCON school communities threatened the safety and tarnished the reputation of these schools. Such abusive actions, however, are directly in violation of the fundamental teachings of the Hare Krishna movement, and are strongly condemned by ISKCON. To address these issues, ISKCON shut down many of the original schools, set up funds to compensate the victims, opened new day and boarding schools integrating revised models of education, opened a Child Protection Office (CPO) dedicated to preventing and appropriately dealing with child abuse, and instituted trainings and policies to combat such abuses, with the goal of total prevention of child abuse.
