= Krishna Avanti Primary School =

Krishna Avanti Primary School may refer to:

- Krishna Avanti Primary School, Harrow, in north London, England
- Krishna Avanti Primary School, Leicester, in East Midlands, England
