= Samworth Academy =

Samworth Academy may refer to:

- Samworth Church Academy
- Samworth Enterprise Academy
- Nottingham University Samworth Academy
