= Samworth =

Samworth may refer to:

- Samworth Brothers, English food manufacturing company
- Samworth Enterprise Academy, school in Leicester, England

== People with the surname ==
- Richard Samworth (born 1978), English statistician
