= Filbert Street =

Football ground of Leicester City (1891 to 2002)

- City Business Stadium (official)
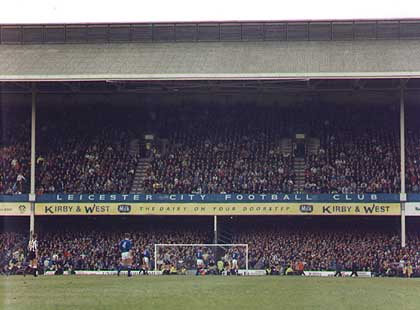
- The south end of Filbert Street, known as the 'Double Decker'.
- Interactive map of Filbert Street
- Full name: Filbert Street Stadium
- Location: Filbert Street, Leicester
- Coordinates: 52°37′25″N 1°8′26″W
- Owner: Leicester City F.C.
- Capacity: 22,000 (at closure); 47,298 (record)
- Field size: 110 x 76 yards

Construction
- Opened: 1891
- Closed: 2002
- Demolished: 2003

Tenant
- Leicester City FC (1891–2002)

Filbert Street was a football stadium in Leicester, England, which served as the home of Leicester City F.C. from 1891 until 2002. Although officially titled the City Business Stadium in the early 1990s, it remained known almost exclusively by its address, like many English football stadiums.

== History ==
=== Early years ===
Leicester City was formed in 1884. The club was then named Leicester Fosse, as its founders mostly lived in the west end of the city, through which the Fosse Way ran. In 1884–85 it played at a ground known as the Racecourse, before sharing Victoria Park with the Leicester Tigers rugby club for two years. Leicester Fosse played at the Belgrave Road Cycle Track for a year, but returned to Victoria Park after the rugby club offered a higher rent to the owners of the Cycle Track.

Leicester Fosse became a professional club in 1889 and laid out its own ground at Mill Lane, just north of Filbert Street. The club was soon forced to move, however, as the local Corporation requested the land for development. The site of what was to become Filbert Street was prepared during the summer of 1891, while Leicester Fosse temporarily played at the Aylestone Road Cricket Ground. Local legend suggests that the new ground was identified by a Miss Westland, the niece of one of the club's founders, Joseph Johnson. The stadium was initially known as Walnut Street, being the closest road to the ground at the time. The first game Leicester Fosse played there was a game against Nottingham Forest's reserve team on 7 November 1891.

The stadium initially consisted of simple earth banks and a small main stand on the west side, until 1921, when a new and much larger main stand was built. The Main Stand opened 24 November 1921. In 1927, a new stand was built at the south end (known as the Spion Kop), and became known as the "Double Decker" although was officially the South Stand. The roof which had previously covered the Kop was rebuilt at the north, or Filbert Street end of the ground. It was in this form that Filbert Street saw its record attendance of 47,298 for the Fifth Round FA Cup tie, a 3–0 defeat against Tottenham Hotspur on 18 February 1928. This game also saw many more spectators watch the match from the roof of the Filbert Street end. Despite the defeat, the stadium saw more FA Cup action that season when it was selected as the neutral venue for the semi-final between Blackburn Rovers and Arsenal on 24 March 1928 where eventual winners Blackburn Rovers won 1–0.

The first phase of ground development concluded with the covering of the East or Popular side in 1939.

=== Second World War and after ===
The middle section of the Main Stand suffered bomb damage in 1940, and was later further damaged by a serious fire. By 1949, the stand had been rebuilt, with much of the labour being supplied by German POWs at a nearby camp. The ground's maximum capacity was now around 42,000. Floodlights were installed and first used for a match against the German champions Borussia Dortmund on 23 October 1957.

After just surviving a council vote to terminate their lease in the late 1940s, City purchased the freehold of the ground in 1962, for the sum of £30,500. In 1971, the first moves towards an all-seater stadium were taken, as the North and East sides were converted to seating. Four years later, 20 basic executive boxes were added to the North Stand. A pioneering polythene cover was introduced to protect the pitch in 1971. The Air Dome covered an area of 90,000 square feet, weighed 24 cwt and took 15 men two hours to lay out and inflate using four electric fans. The Air Dome was removed in 1982.

=== All-seater stadium ===
At the beginning of the 1990s, after considering moving to a new stadium, and a total redevelopment of Filbert Street which would have seen the pitch rotated by 90 degrees, onto the car park behind the Main Stand, City opted to build a new Main Stand, demolishing the existing structure in the summer of 1993. It was anticipated that further modernisation work would take place in the future.

Completed in December 1993, the Carling Stand held 9,500 seated spectators and expanded corporate facilities, costing £6 million. In 1994, the final terraced area – the Kop – was converted to seating giving Filbert Street an all-seated capacity of 21,500, and bringing it into compliance with the Taylor Report which required all Premier League and Division One teams to have all-seater capacity.

=== Neutral venue ===
Filbert Street hosted a Football League test match on 27 April 1895 which saw Derby County beat Notts County 2–1 to remain in the First Division, with Notts County remaining in the Second Division.

It also held the finals of the FA Amateur Cup in 1896 and 1900. On 28 March 1896, Bishop Auckland beat Royal Artillery Portsmouth 1–0 and on 31 March 1900, Bishop Auckland were again the winners, beating Lowestoft Town 5–1.

Filbert Street was later used as a neutral venue for two FA Cup semi-finals. The first took place in 1928 between Blackburn Rovers and Arsenal and in 1962 it hosted a semi-final replay between Burnley and Fulham, following a draw at Villa Park. In the replay, Burnley progressed to the final with a 2–1 win.

It was the neutral venue of the semi-final of the 1970–71 FA Trophy between Hillingdon Borough F.C. and Hereford United, which Hillingdon won 2–0.

It also held multiple FA Cup second replays including two long running ties. In March 1975, it hosted the second replay of League champions Leeds United against Ipswich Town in the fifth round of the cup following two previous draws but the second replay also ended in a draw (0–0). Two days later, the teams met again at Filbert Street with Ipswich Town finally winning 3–2 to progress to the semi-final against eventual winners West Ham United. In 1979, Filbert Street again hosted a marathon tie, this time between Arsenal and Sheffield Wednesday in the third round. Again, following two draws between the teams, Filbert Street hosted the second replay on 15 January 1979 but this ended in a 2–2 draw. Two days later the teams met again at Filbert Street but again, the teams could not be separated, drawing 3–3. Finally, in the fifth game between the teams held the following week, Arsenal progressed to the next round, winning 2–0. It was the last time the stadium had an attendance over 30,000 (30,275). Despite the struggle to progress from the third round, Arsenal went on to win the competition.

Filbert Street also held one Football League Cup second replay between Brighton & Hove Albion and Oldham Athletic on 20 September 1977, which Oldham won 2–1 after extra time.

It hosted a third round League Cup tie between Luton Town and Coventry City on 27 October 1987 as Luton were banned from using their plastic pitch in the competition. Luton won 3–1.

England under-23s played West Germany's under-23s at the stadium on 14 October 1970, which England won 3–1. England's under-21 team played their final qualifying game of the 1980 UEFA U-21 Football Championship and beat Bulgaria to progress to the finals. It was also used for England under-21s games against Portugal in 1994 and Mexico in 2001.

Filbert Street hosted one full international game between India and Bangladesh on 29 July 2000, with India winning 1–0.

=== Move and demolition ===
There had been plans in 1977 to move to a new stadium to be built in Beaumont Leys. The residents of Anstey and other nearby districts voiced their concerns of a new stadium being built nearby and the plan was stopped and £1 million was spent improving Filbert Street and adding more seats instead.

Following the success of the club under Martin O'Neill during the later part of the 1990s, an expanded stadium was required for higher attendances and to provide better facilities. Expansion of Filbert Street would have been very difficult, as the North and East Stands backed onto housing which would have been expensive to place under a compulsory purchase order. Although expansion was considered, by 1998 the decision had been taken to move to a completely new stadium. After a failed attempt to build a 40,000 all-seater stadium at Bede Island South (on the other bank of the nearby River Soar), the club purchased Freeman's Wharf, a former power station site 200 yards south of Filbert Street. Work began on a 32,500 seater stadium during 2001 and it was opened in July 2002.

Filbert Street was sold to a development company for £3.75 million in March 2002, two months before the last game was played there. The last game to be played at Filbert Street was the last game of the 2001–02 season, a 2–1 victory against Tottenham Hotspur – one of just five league games that Leicester won during that season, culminating in relegation to Division One. Matt Piper scored the last goal scored at the ground, bringing to an end 111 years of football there. In the autumn of 2002, Rotherham United expressed interest in purchasing the Carling Stand and moving it to their Millmoor stadium, but these plans were soon abandoned and the decade-old stand would soon be demolished along with the rest of Filbert Street.

Demolition of Filbert Street was begun in March 2003. Part of the site is now home to the 'Filbert Village' development, built as accommodation for students for the nearby De Montfort University and University of Leicester. The road running through the development is called Lineker Road after one of Leicester City's most famous players, Gary Lineker. The rest of the site was meant to be developed for housing, but this work was cancelled due to the 2008 financial crisis. It was then leased to a car parking company, but this arrangement was terminated by Leicester City Council in March 2012.
