= Emmanuel Christian School =

Emmanuel Christian School may refer to:

- Emmanuel Christian School, Tasmania, in Rokeby, Tasmania, Australia
- Emmanuel Christian School, Quebec, in Dollard-des-Ormeaux, Quebec, Canada
- Emmanuel Christian School, Christchurch, a school in Christchurch, New Zealand
- Emmanuel Christian School, Leicester, in Leicestershire, UK
- Emmanuel Christian School (Indiana), in Wabash, Indiana; a high school in Indiana, US
- Emmanuel Christian School (Toledo, Ohio), US
