= Lancaster Academy =

Coordinates: 52.6059°N 1.1268°W

Location
- Knighton Lane East; Leicester, Leicestershire, LE2 6FU; England

Information
- Type: Academy
- Department for Education URN: 143857 Tables
- Ofsted: Reports
- Principal: Alicia McElhill
- Gender: Co-educational
- Age: 11 to 16
- Website: http://www.lancaster.lwlat.org.uk/

Lancaster Academy is a co-educational secondary school located in Knighton, Leicester, England.

== History ==
On 1 September 2000 Lancaster School acquired specialist sports college status one of only four schools in the East Midlands to have achieved this designation at that time.

In January 2007, the school alongside Sir Jonathan North Community College added a jointly owned £1.6 million four court indoor tennis centre to accompany its six floodlit outdoor tennis courts, multi-use games area, two gymnasiums and field.

During the 2006/2007 school term, the School was featured in the BBC Two documentary series The Choir: Boys Don't Sing, in which choir master Gareth Malone started a student and staff choir and took them to perform at the Royal Albert Hall which was aired during February 2008.

In January 2014, the school opened a new building costing £13 million which consisted of new science, maths and IT departments alongside a state of the art dinner atrium and a new kitchen to replace the ageing buildings which had been in use since the early 1970s.

During early 2015 Mr. R Kennedy left his position as Headteacher with Anna Fisher becoming interim head.

In 2016 a published report showed the school was in £1 million of debt.

During 2017 the school became an academy in partnership with The Learning without Limits Academy trust who also operate Babington Academy in Beaumont Leys.
