= BBC Sports Unsung Hero Award =

British award for contribution in sport

- Country: United Kingdom
- Presented by: BBC Sports Personality of the Year
- First award: 2003; 23 years ago
- Final award: 2024; 2 years ago
- Most recent winner: Jean Paton (2024)

The BBC Sports Unsung Hero Award was an award given annually as part of the BBC Sports Personality of the Year ceremony each December. Presented from 2003 to 2024, the award was given to the sportsperson who has made a substantive yet unrecognised contribution to sport.

== History ==
The inaugural winner in 2003 was 63-year-old Nobby Woodcock, for "his unstinting work with grassroots football in Wales". Of the fourteen recipients to date, four were chosen for their contributions to football; the other recipients contributed towards boxing, basketball, athletics, swimming, sailing and the Special Olympics. As of 2024, six of the twenty two winners have each been put forward from the BBC East Midlands region, four from the BBC South region and two from the BBC East and BBC Scotland regions. The other winners came from the BBC London, BBC North West, BBC Northern Ireland, BBC West, BBC West Midlands and BBC Wales regions. The most recent award was presented in 2024 to Jean Paton.

== Nomination procedure ==
Sportspeople are nominated by the public, and must be aged 16 years or over on 1 January that year. Nominees may not put themselves forward or be nominated by a member of their immediate family. A nominee must actively help others participate in a sport at any level on a voluntary basis. The work they do must not be part of their job or take part within their places of work, and they must not be a participant in the sporting group they are helping. Previous winners of the award are ineligible for nomination. One winner is selected from each of the twelve BBC English Regions, and the three national regions: BBC Scotland, BBC Wales, and BBC Northern Ireland. A judging panel then chooses the Unsung Hero winner from the fifteen regional winners.

== Winners ==
=== By year ===
BBC Sports Unsung Hero Award winners
Year	Nationality	Winner	Location	BBC Region	Sport	Rationale	Note
2003	WAL	Nobby Woodcock	Newport, South Wales	BBC Wales	Football	for "his unstinting work with grassroots football in Wales".	
2004	ENG	Abdullah Ben-Kmayal	Peckham, London	BBC London	Football	for his work with Bethwin Football Club, a club he founded and funded personally.	
2005	ENG	Trevor Collins	Isle of Wight	BBC South	Swimming	for more than 25 years work in administration and coaching at the West Wight Swimming Club.	
2006	ENG	Val Hanover	Oswestry, Shropshire	BBC West Midlands	Special Olympics	for spending nearly 30 years organising Special Olympics for thousands of people with learning difficulties in North Shropshire.	
2007	ENG	Margaret Simons	Bicester, Oxfordshire	BBC South	Football	for over 40 years of work with Bardwell FC, a community football team that she founded in 1964.	
2008	ENG	Ben Geyser	Dorchester, Dorset	BBC South	Boxing	for setting up three boxing clubs, and campaigning for a permanent home for the Dorchester Amateur Boxing Club.	
2009	ENG	Doreen Adcock	Milton Keynes, Buckinghamshire	BBC East	Swimming	for teaching "over 13,000 people to swim in the town over the last 35 years".	
2010	ENG	Lance Haggith	Bedfordshire	BBC East	Basketball	for providing children of differing abilities coaching in basketball.	
2011	SCO	Janice Eaglesham & Ian Mirfin	Scotland	BBC Scotland	Athletics	for providing coaching to disabled athletes.	
2012	ENG	Sue & Jim Houghton	Leicester	BBC East Midlands	Various	for transforming a derelict Leicestershire sports ground into a popular community facility for tennis, squash, association football, bowls and dance.	
2013	ENG	Joe & Maggie Forber	Manchester	BBC North West	Basketball	recognised regionally for their hard work at the Amaechi Basketball Centre in Whalley Range.	
2014	ENG	Jill Stidever	Hinckley, Leicestershire	BBC East Midlands	Swimming	for nearly 60 years' work helping children with special needs learn to swim.	
2015	NIR	Damien Lindsay	Belfast	BBC Northern Ireland	Football	founded St James' Swifts F.C. five years ago with the aim of helping to keep young people off the streets in a deprived part of his native city.	
2016	ENG	Marcellus Baz	Nottingham	BBC East Midlands	Boxing	for providing free boxing classes to hundreds of young people at his boxing school.	
2017	ENG	Denise Larrad	Hinckley and Bosworth, Leicester	BBC East Midlands	Various	for helping the elderly get involved in sport and leading running groups encouraging people of all ages to get active.	
2018	SCO	Kirsty Ewen	Inverness	BBC Scotland	Swimming	overcame mental health issues to inspire others to do the same and find a better place through swimming.	
2019	ENG	Keiren Thompson	Bulwell, Nottingham	BBC East Midlands	Various	runs the community project 'Helping Kids Achieve' in Bulwell in Nottingham, one of the most deprived areas in the city.	
2020	NZL; ENG	Sgt. Matt Ratana	East Grinstead, West Sussex	BBC South East	Rugby	led a resurgence in popularity at the East Grinstead Rugby Club after becoming head coach. Awarded posthumously.	
2021	ENG	Sam Barlow	Hull	BBC Yorkshire and Lincolnshire	Various	founded a fitness club for those experiencing loss after losing her husband to cancer.	
2022	ENG	Mike Alden	Bristol	BBC West	Football	founded Park Knowle FC in one of Bristol's most deprived areas, open to players of all ages and ability.	
2023	ENG	Des Smith	Sheffield	BBC Yorkshire	Various	founded Sheffield Caribbean Sports Club to provide sporting opportunities for ethnic minorities and encourage community cohesion	
2024	ENG	Jean Paton	Lymington, Hampshire	BBC South	Sailing	for her decades of work as a volunteer and instructor at Salterns Sailing Club in Lymington	

=== By region ===
This table lists the total number of awards won by the BBC Region through which the recipient qualified for the award.

Winners by region
Nationality	Number of wins
BBC East Midlands	6
BBC South	4
BBC East	2
BBC Scotland	2
BBC London	1
BBC North West	1
BBC Northern Ireland	1
BBC South East	1
BBC Wales	1
BBC West	1
BBC West Midlands	1
BBC Yorkshire	1
BBC Yorkshire and Lincolnshire	1

=== By sport ===
This table lists the total number of awards won by the sport the recipient contributed towards.

Winners by sport
Sport of contribution	Number of wins
Football	4
Swimming	4
Basketball	3
Boxing	2
Athletics	1
Rugby	1
Sailing	1
Special Olympics	1
Various	5
