= Shivani Raja =

British politician (born 1994)

Shivani Raja MP
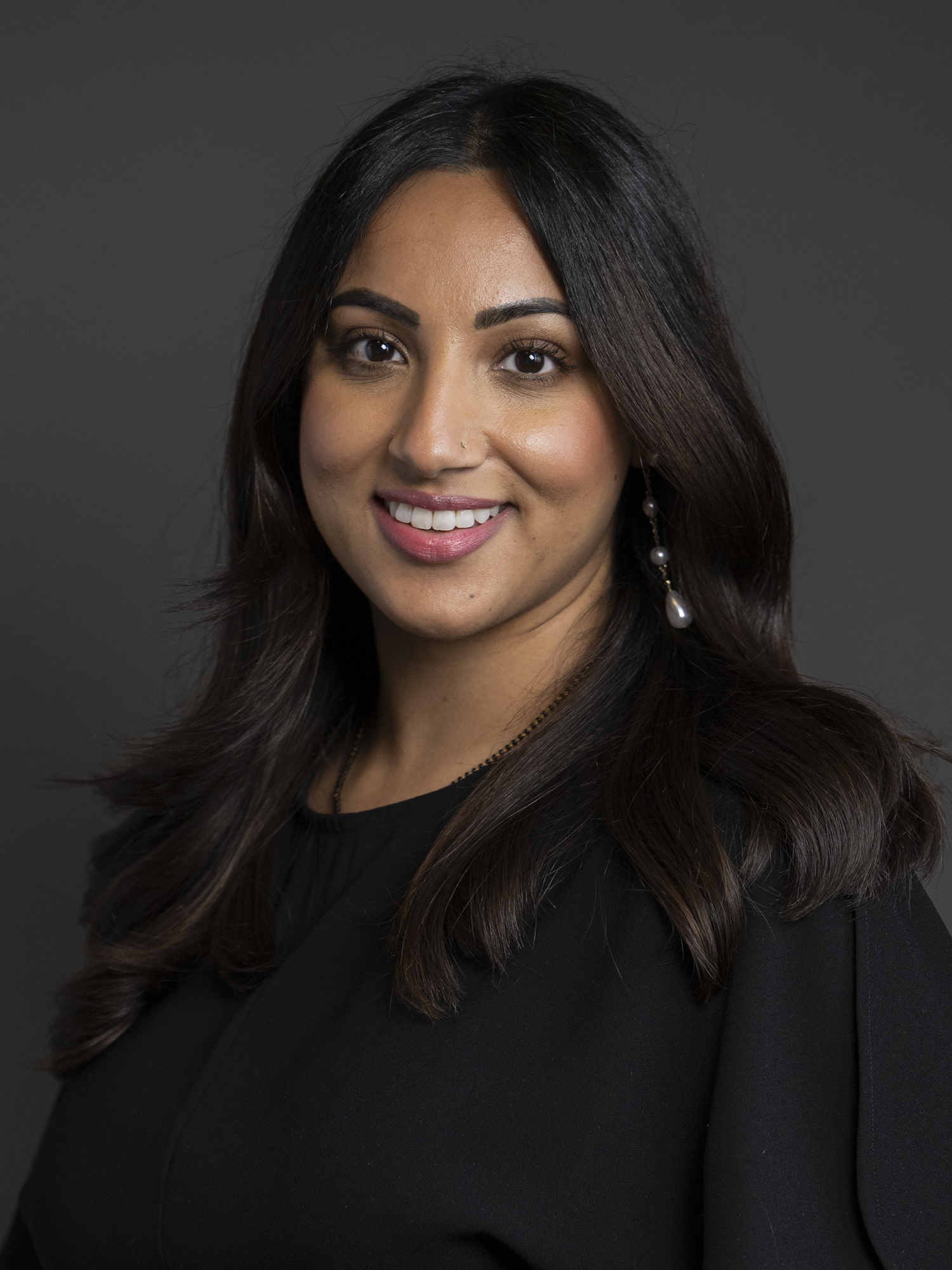
- Official portrait, 2024

Member of Parliament for Leicester East
- Incumbent
- Assumed office 4 July 2024
- Preceded by: Claudia Webbe
- Majority: 4,426 (9.5%)

Personal details
- Born: Shivani Rajnikant Raja; 21 July 1994 (age 32) Leicester, Leicestershire, England
- Party: Conservative
- Spouse: Utkarsh Thakkar (m. 2023)
- Education: De Montfort University (BSc)
- Website: shivaniraja.uk

Shivani Rajnikant Raja (born 21 July 1994) is a British Conservative Party politician. She has been the Member of Parliament (MP) for Leicester East since 2024. She gained the seat from Claudia Webbe.

== Early life and career ==
Shivani was born in Rushey Mead, Leicester, to parents who arrived in the UK from India and Kenya in the 1970s. She studied at Herrick Primary School, Soar Valley College, and Wyggeston and Queen Elizabeth I College. She graduated from De Montfort University with a First Class Honours degree in cosmetic science in 2016. In 2017, she competed in the 2017 Miss India UK beauty pageant, where she was a semi-finalist.

== Parliamentary career ==
In May 2024, Raja was announced as the Conservative candidate standing in Leicester East constituency. She was elected to the House of Commons in July 2024 during the 2024 general election, after receiving a plurality with 14,526 votes. Her victory was the only seat which the Conservatives gained in the 2024 election. She took the Oath of Allegiance holding the Gita.

She was appointed as a Parliamentary Private Secretary to the Shadow Equalities Office when Kemi Badenoch took over from Rishi Sunak as Leader of the Conservative Party.

In September 2026, the Leicester Conservative Federation held a meeting to consider whether Raja should be readopted as the Conservative candidate for Leicester East at the next general election. According to the BBC, Raja narrowly lost a secret ballot held at the meeting. However, the federation's acting chair, Phil King, subsequently declared the meeting null and void due to an administrative error concerning invitations. King said that a further selection meeting would take place in due course.

== Electoral history ==
General election 2024: Leicester East
Party	Candidate	Votes	%	±%
Conservative	Shivani Raja	14,526	31.1	–7.4
Labour	Rajesh Agrawal	10,100	21.6	–29.3
Liberal Democrats	Zuffar Haq	6,329	13.5	+7.9
Independent	Claudia Webbe	5,532	11.8	N/A
One Leicester	Keith Vaz	3,681	7.9	N/A
Reform	Raj Solanki	2,611	5.6	+3.1
Green	Mags Lewis	2,143	4.6	+2.8
Independent	Malihah Adam	974	2.1	N/A
Independent	Nagarjun Agath	703	1.5	N/A
Independent	Khandu Patel	115	0.2	N/A
Majority		4,426	9.5	–2.7
Turnout		46,714	61.0	–2.1
Registered electors		76,560		
Conservative gain from Labour		Swing	+11.0	

Parliament of the United Kingdom
Preceded by Claudia Webbe	Member of Parliament for Leicester East; 2024–present	Incumbent
