= St Patrick's Catholic Church, Leicester =

Roman Catholic church in Leicester, England

Coordinates: 52.658°N 1.142°W

St Patrick's Church is a Roman Catholic church in the Beaumont Leys area of Leicester. The current church building dates from 1959, built to accommodate Leicester's growing Catholic population, although the parish was first created in 1854. The current church building is in the Romanesque style with three distinctive domes in the nave of the church. A stained glass window depicting Saint Patrick, the parish patron, stands at the back of the church. The current parish priest is Father Raphael Imoni, who arrived at St Patrick's in September 2018. The church serves St Patrick's Catholic Voluntary Academy and English Martyrs Catholic School.

== History ==
The parish started life as a school chapel in Royal East Street, Leicester in 1854. The chapel was dedicated to Saint Patrick by Fr Nickolds OP, from Holy Cross Priory, Leicester. The mission of the chapel was handed over to the Diocese of Nottingham in 1894. Fr. Hawkins served as the first parish priest. The original chapel closed in 1940 due to a falling Catholic population in Leicester. In 1949, on the appointment of Fr. Hill as Parish Priest of Our Lady and St.Patrick's, a Mass Centre had been set up in the grandstand of the Leicester Stadium and land was acquired in Beaumont Leys Lane for a church, presbytery and parish hall.

The new church was blessed and officially opened by Bishop Edward Ellis on Saint Patrick's Day 1959. Fr. Sullivan was appointed Parish Priest in October 1961. Fr. Sullivan was responsible for the completion of the interior of the Church by the addition of the wooden Stations of the Cross, the statues of the Sacred Heart and Saint Joseph the Worker, together with the Cross of Christ Triumphant and the two stained glass windows in the Sanctuary. These features are still present.

After Fr Sullivan the Church was served by the Blessed Sacrament Fathers until Fr Neary was appointed Parish Priest. Fr Neary was succeeded by Fr Tutto who continued with the plans for further improvements. During 1982 and 1983, thanks to the generosity of benefactors, the St. Patrick's Chapel was completed by the addition of Saint Patrick's statue of carved wood and parish banner. Fr Tutto was succeeded by Fr Stephen Lennon in 1986 and in 1996 Fr Michael Lynch was appointed Parish Priest. Under Fr Lynch, the parish hall was erected, which still serves as a venue for events today. Father Jimmy Browne served as Parish priest from 2000 until 2009 and during this time the church was redecorated and the sanctuary refurbished. He celebrated the golden anniversary of the parish in 2009 with a Mass celebrated with Bishop Malcolm McMahon, then Bishop of Nottingham. To celebrate the anniversary, a new stained glass window was commissioned in the Baptistry. The window depicts a course of faith through a river from natural beginnings to the depiction of the Eucharist. Father Martin Hardy arrived in the Parish in April 2009. He was a popular figure among parishioners and in the wider Leicester community, hosting Liz Kendall MP and other civic dignitaries at the annual St Patrick's celebrations. Father Raphael Imoni arrived in the parish as the parish priest as of September 2018. The mass attendance is above average for Leicester, with a weekly attendance of over 500.

== Notable features ==
The church contains a number of notable features:

- Carved Stations of the Cross
- Wooden carving depicting Saint Patrick
- Wooden carving depicting Saint Joseph
- Prayer Room dedicated to Saint Brigid
- Chapel dedicated to Saint Patrick
- Stained glass window depicting Saint Patrick
- Lady Altar with a mosaic icon of the Virgin Mary
- 50th Anniversary Stained Glass Window
- Original baptismal font
- Carved triumphal cross depicting Christ the King
- A depiction of the Holy Spirit above the tabernacle
