= Marcellus Baz =

British sports administrator

Marcellus Baz BEM
- Born: 1975 or 1976 (age 50–51); The Meadows, Nottingham, England
- Occupations: Founder and CEO of Switch Up and Nottingham School of Boxing, Public Speaker
- Years active: 2013–present
- Awards: British Empire Medal; BBC Sports Unsung Hero Award
- Website: www.marcellusbaz.co.uk

Marcellus Baz BEM heads charity-based organisations in Nottingham, offering community sports facilities together with outreach to, and mentoring of, young people. In 2016, Baz was named the BBC Get Inspired Unsung Hero at the BBC Sports Personality of the Year awards for his support of young people in Nottingham, UK. He received the British Empire Medal (BEM) in the 2017 New Year Honours for services to youth boxing and the community in Nottingham. In 2025, he was listed in The Big Issue's Top 100 Changemakers for Culture and Sport.

Baz has been interviewed about youth violence, knife crime, and UK drug culture. He also completed a TEDxYouth talk in 2018 entitled Your Tribe is Your Vibe.

Baz founded Switch Up, a community interest company with 35 staff focused on mentoring, education, and employability for young people, particularly those not in education, training, or employment (NEET). The organisation combines boxing with personal development, counselling, and life skills training to empower youth and reduce engagement with crime.

== Early life ==
Baz was born and raised in The Meadows, Nottingham. In his youth, he was involved in gangs, substance abuse and criminal activity. After discovering boxing at a local leisure centre and pursuing the sport, a knife attack ended his career, inspiring him to use sport as a tool for positive change and community impact.

== Career ==
Baz registered the Nottingham School of Boxing as a Charitable Incorporated Organisation in September 2014., which has since been renamed The Marcellus Baz Foundation. It is the sister organisation of Switch Up, a Community interest company that uses its profits to facilitate sport, mentoring, counselling, education, and to deliver outreach services to young people in Nottinghamshire.

The foundation now includes the Nottingham School of Boxing and the Mansfield School of Boxing, providing safe spaces for young people to engage in boxing, personal development, and community support activities.

In February 2022, Baz established links with Mansfield District Council to take over a former community sports hall as a boxing gym.

Switch Up's patrons include Jayne Torville and Christopher Dean, Vicky McClure, Darren Fletches, Des Walker and Leigh Wood. HRH Prince Harry also visited the School of Boxing in 2015 to recognise the impact the charity has had on the lives of young people.

As sport is a central part of Switch up, the charity has formed mentoring and youth engagement partnerships with Nottingham Panthers, Nottingham Forest FC and Notts County FC, using sport as a way to build confidence, discipline and community connection.

His philanthropy has also taken him around the globe to LA, Brazil, Norway, Denmark and Canada, attending conferences on violence and gang prevention, speakership at TEDX, and working with dignitaries to replicate his community programme in other locations.

== Community initiatives ==
Switch Up and the Marcellus Baz Foundation collaborates with employers in different sectors such as Morgan Sindall, to offer apprenticeships and employment fairs. Its partnership with Experian and its ‘Money Talks’ initiative has helped support financial literacy in young people.

Since 2022, Switch Up has worked with 200 Degrees Coffee on a social-impact partnership that includes a bespoke coffee blend, with £1 from every kilogram sold donated to the charity. The relationship also supports Swap Shop community events and contributes to sustainable livelihood initiatives for female farmers in Guatemala.

In 2023, Switch Up partnered with the Stephen Lawrence Day Foundation to raise awareness of youth violence and knife crime in the Midlands. The collaboration included outreach work and participation in memorial events to support safer communities.

== Awards and honours ==
- BBC Sports Personality of the Year Unsung Hero Award: 2016
- 2016 BBC East Midlands Get Inspired Unsung Hero award
- Sport Nottinghamshire Community Champion of the Year
- British Empire Medal: 2017
- 2017 UK Coaching National Community Coach of the Year
- Ambassador of UK Coaching
- 2017 Community Coach of the Year, Nottingham Post Sports Awards
