= Rushey Mead =

Suburb of Leicester, England

Coordinates: 52.660°N 1.110°W

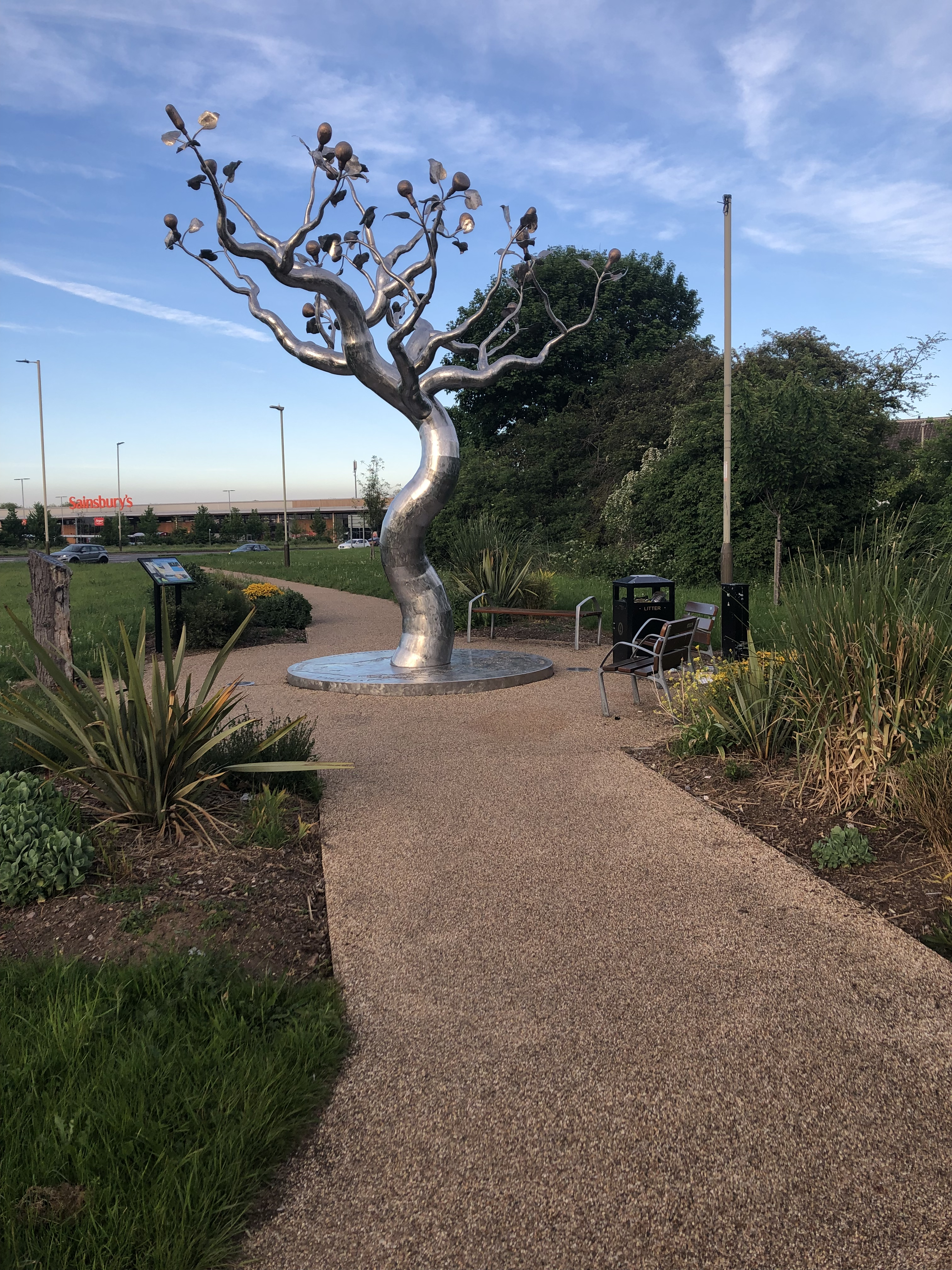
- The World Tree

- Location within Leicestershire
- Population: 15,962 (2011)
- Unitary authority: Leicester
- Ceremonial county: Leicestershire
- Region: East Midlands
- Country: England
- Sovereign state: United Kingdom
- Post town: LEICESTER
- Postcode district: LE4
- Dialling code: 0116
- Police: Leicestershire
- Fire: Leicestershire
- Ambulance: East Midlands
- UK Parliament: Leicester East

Rushey Mead is an area, suburb, electoral ward, and administrative division of the city of Leicester, in the ceremonial county of Leicestershire, England. It comprises the northern Leicester suburb of Rushey Mead in its entirety, as well as a part of the neighbouring area and suburb of Belgrave, and historical parts of neighbouring Northfields and Thurmaston. The ward's population at the 2011 census was 15,962.

== Geography ==
Rushey Mead within Leicester

Rushey Mead is bounded by the wards and areas of Belgrave to the south and west, and Humberstone & Hamilton and Northfields to the east and south-east on the other side of the Midland Main Line. North and north-west of Rushey Mead are the Leicestershire villages of Thurmaston and Birstall at the Leicestershire county border and in the Borough of Charnwood at the start of the Leicester Urban Area in that direction.

== History ==
Rushey Mead was originally a part of the Thurmaston civil parish in the 19th century. The modern day suburb was split from Thurmaston and gazetted as a "Thurmaston Urban District" in 1894, before being annexed to the City of Leicester in 1935, when it was renamed Rushey Mead.

Jesse Jackson, the American politician who was twice a Democratic Party candidate for the nomination in elections to be President of the United States, visited Rushey Mead on 5 December 2015 to open a park named in his honour.

== Business and commerce ==
One of the most important lamp factories in Britain, originally built to supply aircraft parts during World War Two, was located in Rushey Mead. In 1946, British Thomson-Houston (BTH) opened the Mazda Lamps Factory on Melton Road, producing electric lamps of many kinds. BTH had licensed the 'Mazda (light bulb)' brand name from General Electric of the USA (GE). In 1928, BTH was amalgamated with its rival, the Metropolitan-Vickers company, to form Associated Electrical Industries (AEI). The two companies' brand identities were maintained until the 1960s, when, soon after 1967, the holding company AEI was taken over by one of the UK's biggest companies, the General Electric Company (GEC).

In 1964, the lamp factory was renamed Thorn Lighting following the merger of Thorn Lighting with AEI. General Electric, one of the world's biggest companies, acquired Thorn Lighting in 1991. The site contained groundbreaking research labs that made countless contributions of global significance, development workshops, and even built machines used on the factory floor. The factory closed in 2007 after 61 years of producing lamps.

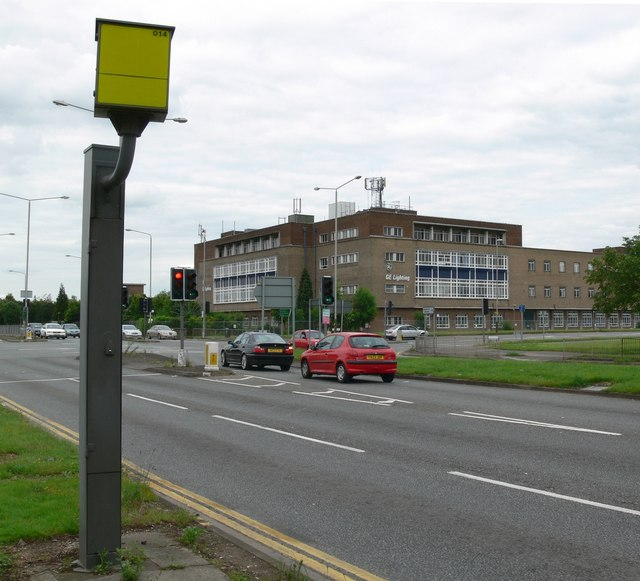
The Former Factory on Melton Road

It became a well-known local landmark, known locally as "GE Thorn" or simply "Thorn Lighting," after Sir Jules Thorn, who ran the business in the 1970s. For many years, at Christmas time, there had been a public Christmas lights display on the factory site, attracting people from Leicester, the Midlands, and beyond.

The site of the former Thorn Lighting Factory is now occupied by a Sainsbury’s Supermarket. There is a large metallic tree, called The World Tree, built opposite the former site on the corner of Melton Road and Troon Way, with a map of the world on its base. This was built in honour of the former factory.

== Demographics ==
As of the 2011 Census, the population of Rushey Mead was 15,962 and was made up of approximately 51% females and 49% males.

The average age in Rushey Mead is 39, while the median age is 38.

53.9% of people living in Rushey Mead were born in England. Other top answers for country of birth were 18.7% India, 6.6% Kenya, 1.7% Sri Lanka, 1.2% Africa not otherwise specified, 1.0% Pakistan, 0.5% Ireland, 0.4% Zimbabwe, 0.4% Scotland, 0.3% Somalia.

61.0% of people living in Rushey Mead speak English. The other top languages spoken are 23.6% Gujarati, 5.5% Punjabi, 1.8% Tamil, 1.3% Polish, 0.9% Urdu, 0.9% Slovak, 0.9% South Asian Language, 0.5% Portuguese, 0.4% Hindi.

The religious make up of Rushey Mead is 43.1% Hindu, 21.7% Christian, 10.5% Muslim, 9.8% Sikh, 9.2% No religion, 0.3% Buddhist, 0.1% Jewish. 668 people did not state a religion. 18 people identified as Jedi knights, and 2 people said they believe in Heavy Metal.

54.2% of people are married, 5.4% cohabit with a member of the opposite sex, 0.4% live with a partner of the same sex, 24.5% are single and have never married or been in a registered same sex partnership, 6.0% are separated or divorced. There are 552 widowed people living in Rushey Mead.

The top occupations listed by people in Rushey Mead are process, plant and machine operatives 15.0%, administrative and secretarial 13.6%, elementary 13.3%, sales and customer service 12.2%, administrative 11.3%, process, plant and machine operatives 10.9%, professional 10.6%, skilled trades 10.0%, elementary administration and service 9.5%, sales 9.4%.

== Education ==
Primary schools: Wyvern Primary, Herrick Primary, Sandfield Primary, and Rushey Mead Primary.

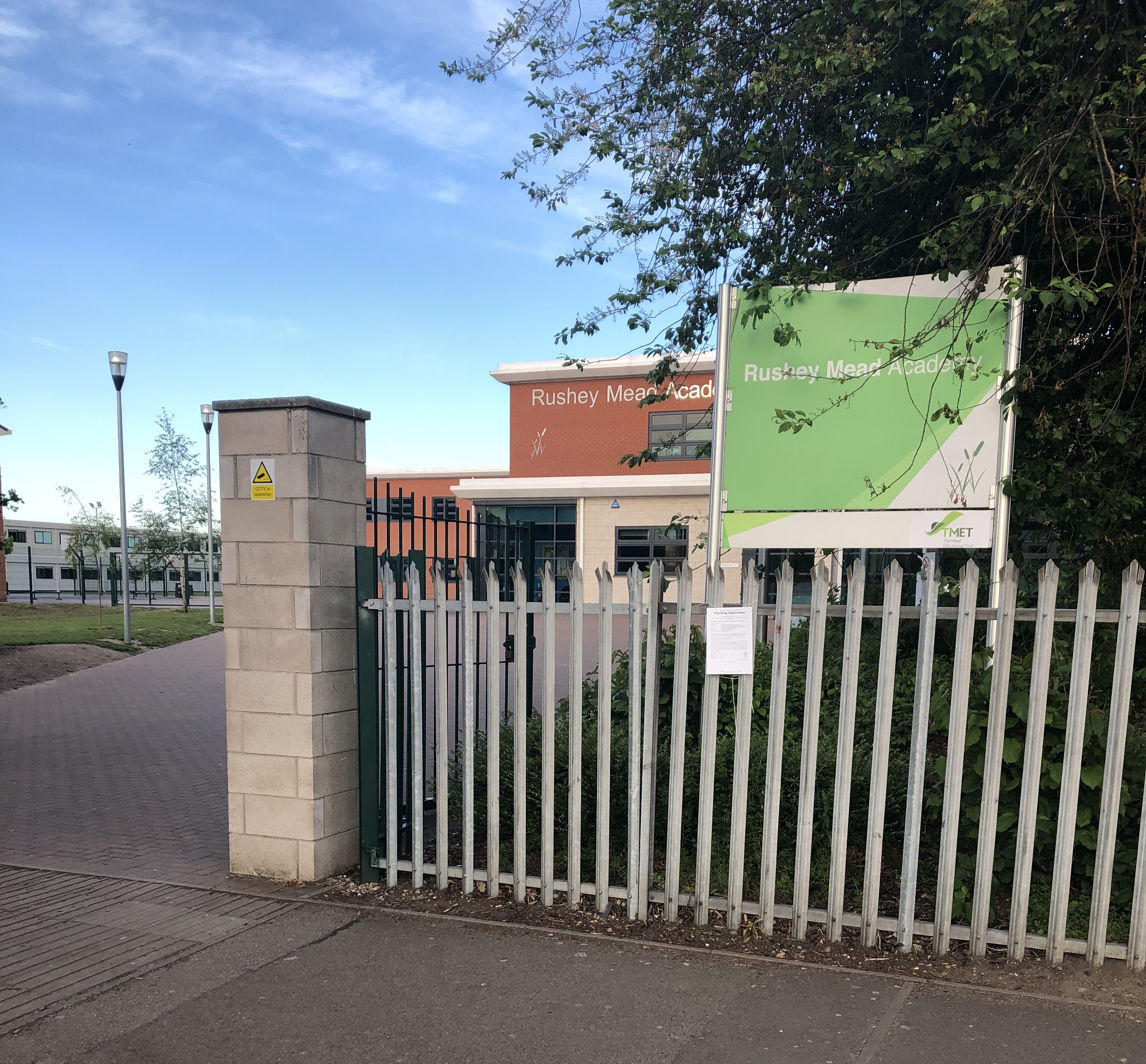
Rushey Mead Academy

Secondary schools: Rushey Mead Academy, which is the best state-funded secondary school in Leicester and Leicestershire, and Soar Valley College.

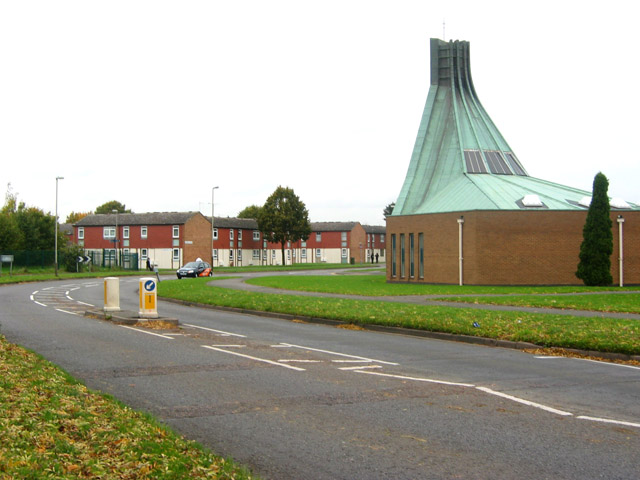
Gleneagles Avenue, where in which Soar Valley College is located

== Places of interest ==
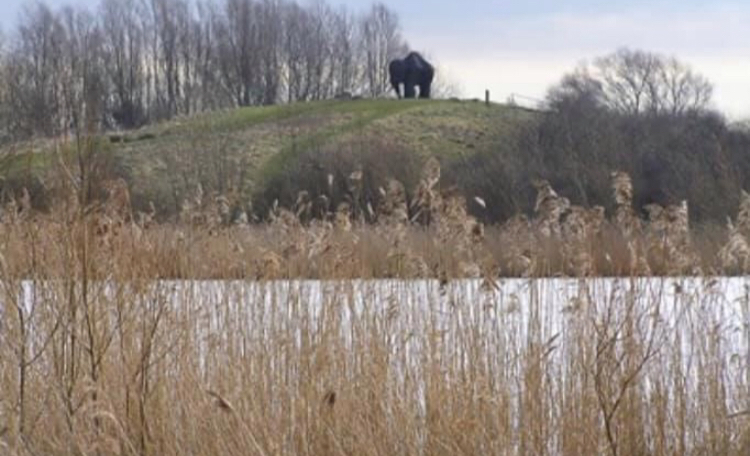

- Watermead Country Park - a network of artificial lakes with a large statue of a mammoth atop a hill.

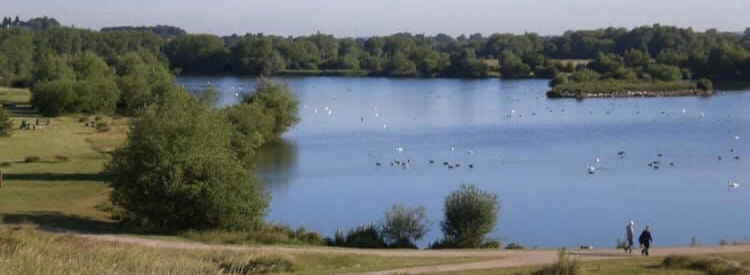

=== The World Tree ===
The World Tree is a steel sculpture of a tree, 5 m (16 ft) tall, with bronze lightbulbs on the branches. It is located on the corner of Melton Road and Troon Way. At the base is a map of the world, with the names of the continents around the outer edge. The branches of the tree represent reaching out to the diverse communities of Leicester. It commemorates and stands opposite the former site of the GE-Thorn Lighting Factory, the tree itself representing light, which a Sainsbury's supermarket now occupies. It cost £62,000 and was paid for by Sainsbury's. It was unveiled on 4 March 2016 by the Speaker of the House of Commons John Bercow in the attendance of Mayor of Leicester Peter Soulsby and Leicester East MP Keith Vaz.

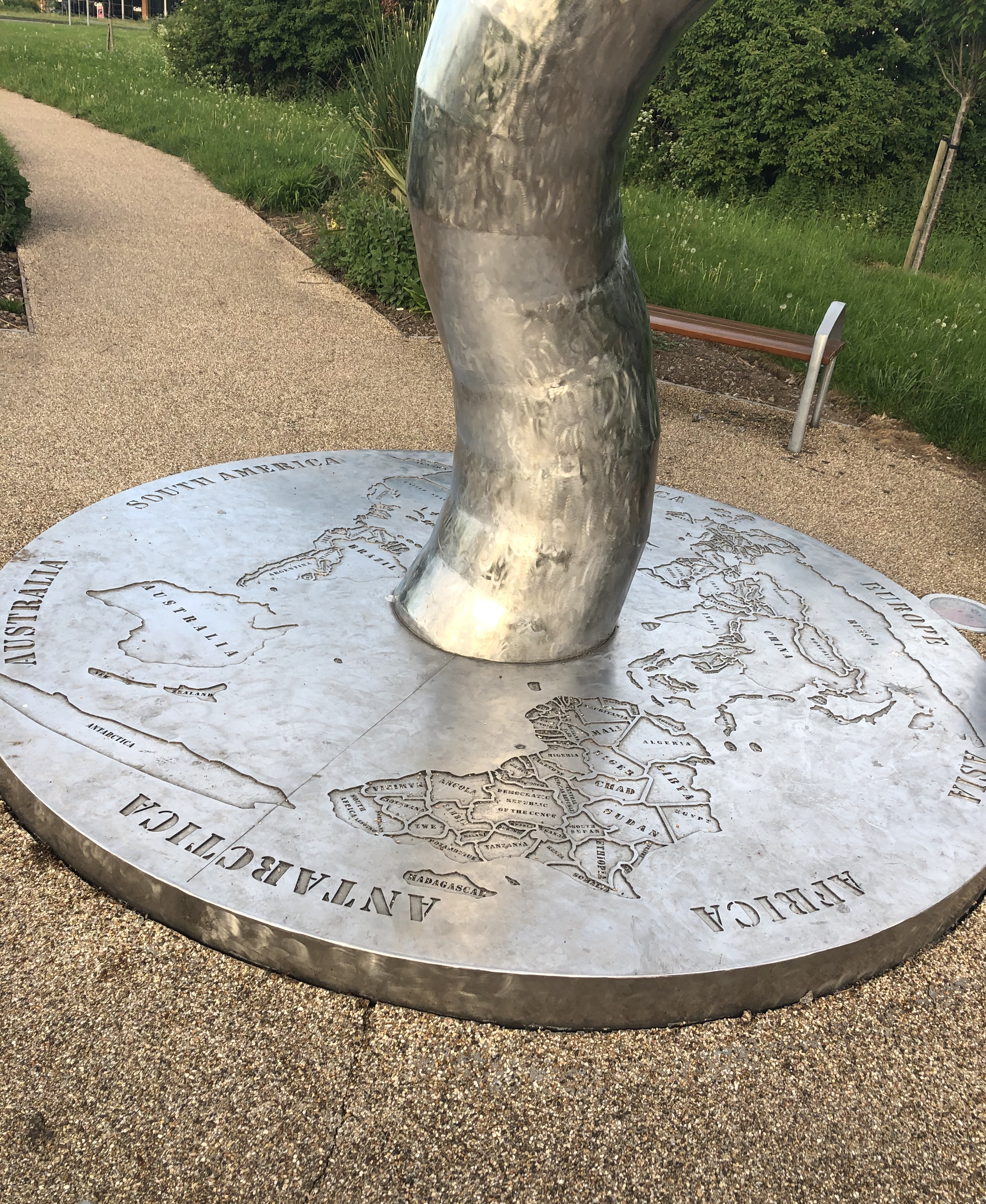

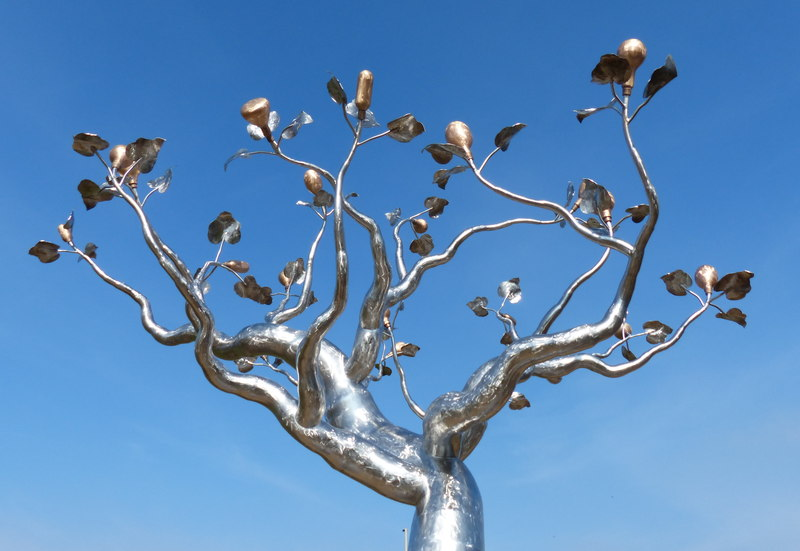

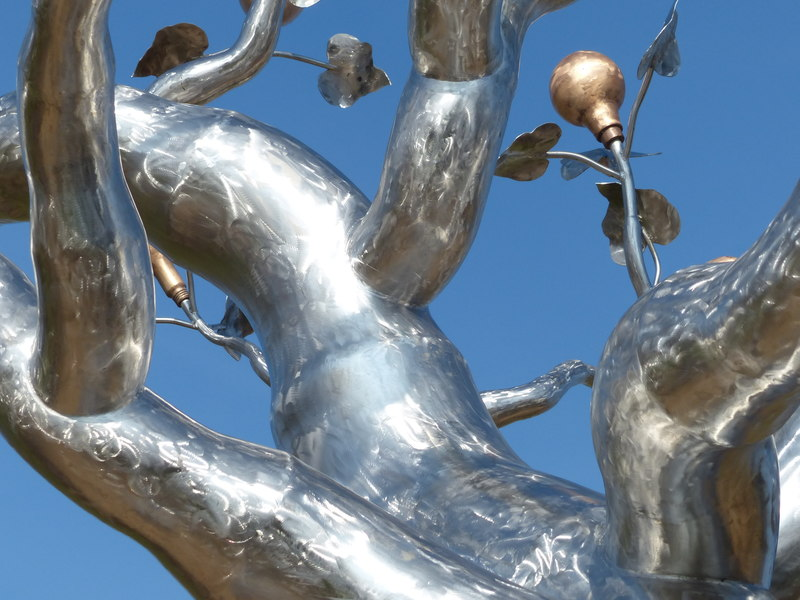

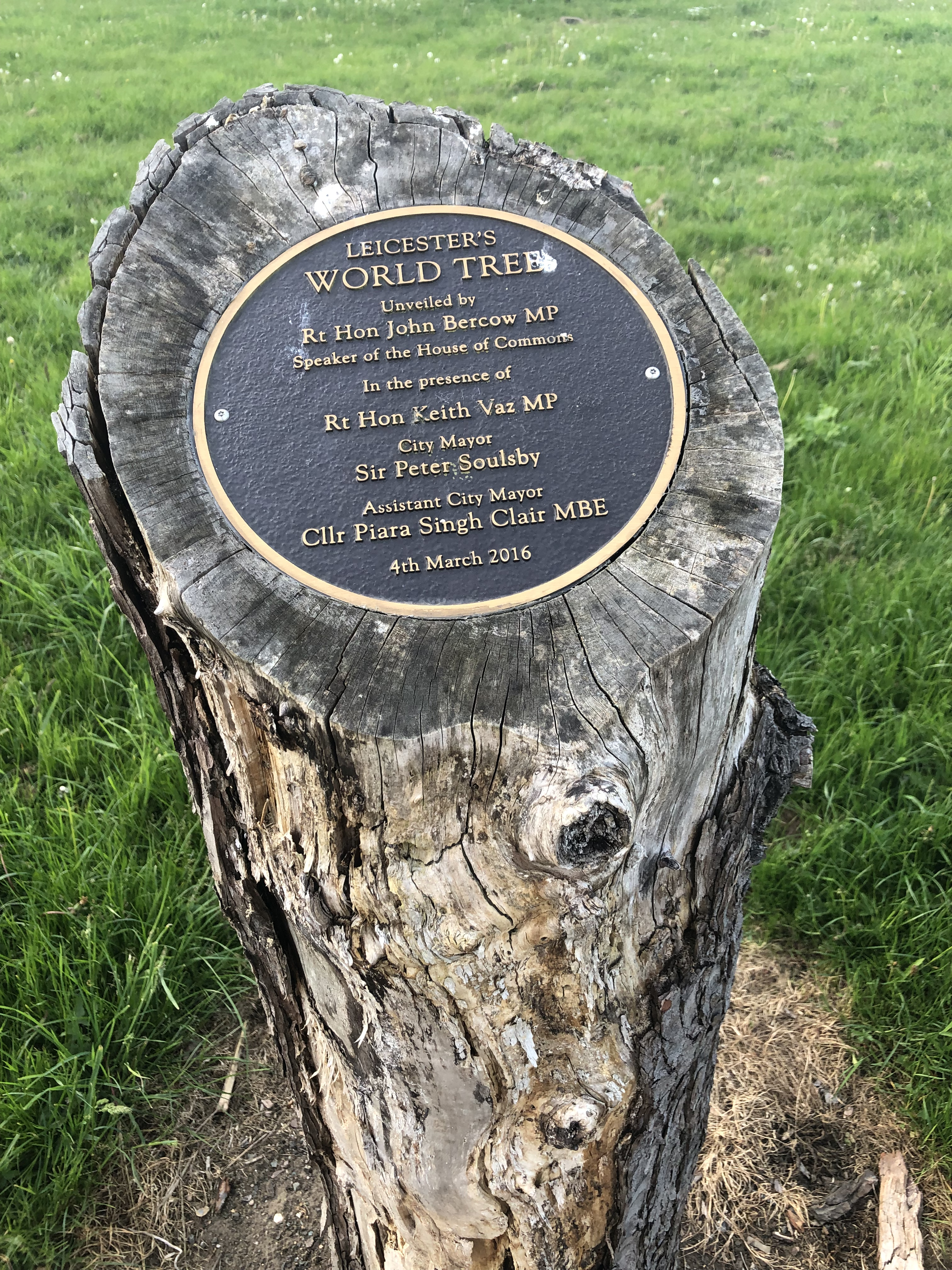

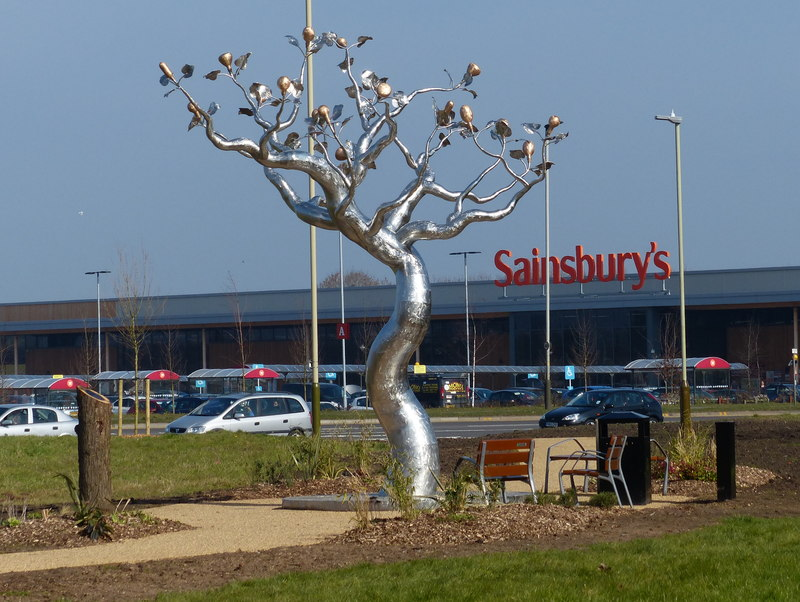

== Scenery ==
The River Soar runs along the west of Rushey Mead and up to Watermead Country Park.

== Shopping ==
There is a large Sainsbury’s supermarket on Melton Road, including a garage and café.

== Transport ==
=== Major roads ===
Rushey Mead is located on the A607 and the A563 roads.

=== Bus ===
First Leicester service 4 serves Rushey Mead on Glenagles Avenue and Trevino Drive, and Arriva Midlands services 5, 5A, and 6 all serve Rushey Mead along the A607 Melton Road.

All bus services operate along the Golden Mile from and into Leicester City Centre.

The nearest bus stations in Leicester City Centre are Haymarket and St Margaret's.

=== Train ===
The nearest train stations are Leicester railway station and Syston railway station.

The Midland Main Line runs along to the east of Rushey Mead.

=== Airport ===
The nearest airport is East Midlands Airport, located in Leicestershire and 19.8 miles (31.9 km) away from Rushey Mead.

== Politics ==
Rushey Mead is located within the Leicester East parliamentary constituency, a seat currently held by the Conservative Party since 2024. The Labour Party consistently held the seat between 1987 and 2024 but lost the seat to the outgoing Conservative Government despite a landslide victory across the country for the Labour Party in that particular election.

The Rushey Mead electoral ward has been represented on Leicester City Council by three Conservative Party Councillors since 2023.

The electoral ward of Rushey Mead includes a part of neighbouring Belgrave, meaning that, despite the actual geographical location, that specific area may also be classed as being in Rushey Mead by virtue of the electoral ward mapping.

Former Councillors for Rushey Mead include Ross Willmott, a former leader of the city council and the Labour Party candidate for Leicestershire Police and Crime Commissioner, Piara Singh Clair MBE, former deputy city mayor and cabinet member for Culture, Leisure, Sport and Regulatory Services and Rita Patel, former assistant city mayor and cabinet member for Equalities and Special Projects and founder of the Peepul Centre, located in the neighbouring area of Belgrave and close to Leicester City Centre.

Rushey Mead was represented within the East Midlands parliamentary constituency in the European Parliament.

== Council election results ==
=== Rushey Mead 2023 ===
Rushey Mead
Party	Candidate	Votes	%	±%
Conservative	Bhupen Dave	3,036	45.4	
Conservative	Geeta Karavadra	2,990	44.7	
Conservative	Devi Singh Patel	2,844	42.6	
Labour	Piara Singh Clair	2,008	30.1	
Labour	Gurinder Singh Sandhu	1,761	26.4	
Labour	Priya Evarista Lavina Mendes	1,751	26.2	
Independent	Rita Patel	1,328	19.9	
Independent	Dharmesh Bhagwanji Lakhani	941	14.1	
Independent	Rajul Tejura	761	11.4	
Liberal Democrats	Hash Chandarana	475	7.1	
Independent	Ross Willmott	384	5.7	
Liberal Democrats	Pradeep Gocal	301	4.5	
Liberal Democrats	Asit Sodha	213	3.2	
Turnout		6,682	50.6	
Registered electors		13,209		
Conservative gain from Labour				
Conservative gain from Labour				
Conservative gain from Labour				

=== Rushey Mead 2019 ===
Rushey Mead
Party	Candidate	Votes	%	±%
Labour	Rita Patel	4,118		
Labour	Piara Singh Clair	3,786		
Labour	Ross Willmott	3,320		
Conservative	Geeta Mahesh Karavadra	1166		
Conservative	Sudhir Odedra	998		
Conservative	Heten Tejura	883		
Liberal Democrats	Hash Chandarana	556		
Liberal Democrats	Nitesh Pravin Dave	554		
Green	Anne Louise Scott	451		
Majority				
Turnout				

=== Rushey Mead 2015 ===
Rushey Mead
Party	Candidate	Votes	%	±%
Labour	Rita Patel	4,597		
Labour	Piara Singh Clair	4,584		
Labour	Ross Willmott	4,390		
Conservative	Hemubhai Chandarana	1797		
Conservative	Rashmi Vyas	1702		
Conservative	Sarban Singh	1389		
Liberal Democrats	Hash Chandarana	586		
Green	Nimit Jethwa	513		
UKIP	Keith Agius	472		
UKIP	Adam Barker	399		
UKIP	Kyle Perkins	353		
Liberal Democrats	Nitesh Dave	327		
Liberal Democrats	Jaswinder Kaur	305		
LICC	Leila Khamis	117		
Majority				
Turnout			66.4	
Labour hold		Swing		

== Sport ==
Highfield Rangers F.C. is based in Rushey Mead. They are currently members of the Leicestershire Senior League Premier Division.

== Notable people ==
- Parminder Nagra - actress - went to Soar Valley College.
- Rakhee Thakrar - actress - went to Soar Valley College.
- Mark Morrison — singer - went to Rushey Mead Academy.
- Chris Pyatt - professional boxer, former world middleweight champion, Commonwealth Games gold medallist and ABA welterweight champion - went to Rushey Mead Academy.
- Tony Sibson – professional boxer, former European and Commonwealth middleweight champion and three-time world title challenger - went to Rushey Mead Academy.
- Shivani Raja - politician and MP for Leicester East - from Rushey Mead and went to Soar Valley College.
- Jigar Naik — cricketer - went to Rushey Mead Academy.
