= Riverside Business and Enterprise College =

Location
- Lyncote Road; Leicester, Leicestershire, LE3 2EL
- Coordinates: 52.612272°N 1.162166°W

Information
- Established: Wednesday 28 August 1974
- Closed: Friday 15 July 2011
- Local authority: Leicestershire
- Specialist: Business and Enterprise
- Ofsted: Reports
- Principal: Allan Dunsmore
- Age range: 11-16
- Website: http://www.riverside.leicester.sch.uk/

Riverside Business and Enterprise College was a secondary school in Rowley Fields, Leicester, England. Awarded Business and Enterprise College specialist status in 2006. Following declining enrollment and a recommendation by the local authority, the school stopped accepting new pupils on 5 October 2009 and closed on Friday 15 July 2011. In its final year the school had approximately 200 students in year groups 8, 9 and 11 (ages 12–16).

== History ==
Originally known as Rowley Fields Secondary School it opened in August 1974. It changed name to Riverside college in 1999. The school was in special measures from 2003 until 2006 when it acquired business and enterprise college status. Ofsted ratings and exam results have been continuously improving since 2004, with 36% of students achieving at least five GCSEs at grade C or above in 2009. In February 2009, it was revealed only 29 parents applied for 180 pupil places for September. In April, the local authority recommended closing the school "as soon as practicably possible". Prior to the closure it was stated on the school's website that the school was no longer able to accept new pupils and would be closing on Friday 15 July 2011 after 37 years of opening. The site is now used by Ellesmere College, a community special school.
