= Avanti House Secondary School =

Location
- Wemborough Road; Stanmore; London, HA7 2EQ; England; 51°36′30″N 0°18′14″W

Information
- Type: Free school
- Religious affiliation: Hinduism
- Established: 2012
- Local authority: Harrow
- Trust: Avanti Schools Trust
- Department for Education URN: 138227 Tables
- Ofsted: Reports
- Principal: Simon Arnell
- Gender: Coeducational
- Age: 11 to 18
- Enrolment: 1046
- Website: https://avanti.org.uk/avantihouse-secondary

Avanti House Secondary School is coeducational secondary school and sixth form located in the Stanmore area of the London Borough of Harrow, England.

It is a Hindu faith free school that was established in 2012, and is part of the Avanti Schools Trust.

Avanti House Secondary School offers GCSEs as programmes of study for pupils, while students in the sixth form have the option to study from a range of A Levels. The school also offers courses studying Sanskrit.
