= Lance Haggith =

Lance Victor George Haggith OBE (born 14 May 1960 in Watford, England) is the founder of the Sports Traider charity in the UK, and winner of the 2010 BBC Sports Personality of the Year Unsung Hero award. He was a Royal Navy reservist for 6 years, and a National League basketball player and coach.

== Honours and awards ==
Haggith was appointed Officer of the Order of the British Empire (OBE) in the 2022 Birthday Honours for charitable and voluntary services to vulnerable people, particularly during Covid-19.

- 2001 Royal Humane Society award for bravery for rescuing a girl from a burning car
- 2009 Nat West New Business of the Year winner
- 2010 BBC Sports Personality of the Year winner Unsung Hero
- 2011 Big Society Award winner from David Cameron, Prime Minister of the United Kingdom
- 2012 Olympic torch bearer
- 2012 Big Venture winner
- 2017 Honorary Doctor of Science (outstanding services to sport), University of Bedford

== Founder ==
- Lance of London
- BCP
- Sports Traider charity
- Hoops Aid
- Sports£Land
- BounceBack
- Golf Aid
- Designer of the calpol sachet and packbuster
- Boxing Aid
- Puck Aid

== See also ==
- BBC Sports Unsung Hero Award
