= Avanti Fields School =

Location
- Furrow View, Colin Grundy Drive, Leicester, LE5 OBX; England

Information
- Type: Free school
- Religious affiliation: Hinduism
- Established: 2018
- Local authority: Leicester City Council
- Trust: Avanti Schools Trust
- Department for Education URN: 143679 Tables
- Ofsted: Reports
- Principal: Vanessa Bardsley
- Deputy Principal / Head of Secondary: Nisha Kholia
- Gender: Coeducational
- Age: 3 to 16
- Enrolment: 961
- Website: https://avanti.org.uk/avantifields/

Avanti Fields School is a Hindu faith all-through school in Leicester, United Kingdom that is part of the Avanti Schools Trust.

== History ==
The school opened in 2018 in temporary accommodation on Narborough Road before moving to its permanent site in the Hamilton area of the city in September 2021.

== Curriculum ==
Avanti schools aim to promote "educational excellence, character formation and spiritual insight." Avanti schools follow the standard national curriculum of the government-run schools of the United Kingdom. In addition to the standard curriculum, Avanti schools feature Sanskrit language teaching, meditation and yoga practice, ethics and philosophy education, and inclusive religious instruction. Religious education is evenly split between Hinduism and other world religions.

== See also ==
- Krishna Avanti Primary School, Leicester
- International Society for Krishna Consciousness
