= Beaumont Leys School =

Co-educational comprehensive secondary school in Leicester, England

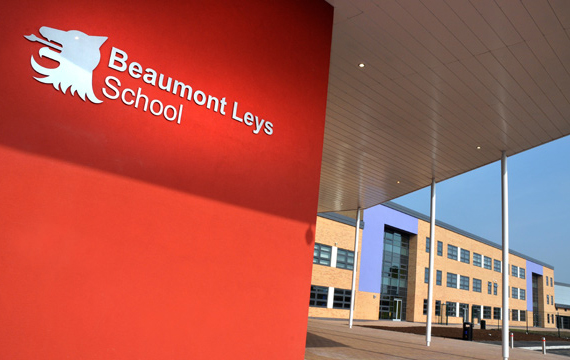

Location
- Anstey Lane; Leicester, Leicestershire, LE4 0FL; England; 52°39′18″N 1°09′38″W

Information
- Type: Community school
- Motto: Together We Achieve Success
- Established: 2009
- Local authority: Leicester
- Department for Education URN: 120281 Tables
- Ofsted: Reports
- Principal: Dawn Parkinson
- Gender: Mixed
- Age: 11 to 16
- Colours: Black and white
- Website: www.beaumontleys.leicester.sch.uk

Beaumont Leys School is a co-educational comprehensive secondary school in Leicester, England, which caters for students aged between 11 and 16. The school has one of Leicester's four Learning Support Units and one of two City Learning Centres. Rebuilt to the cost of £14,000,000 in 2009 in the Building schools for the future project it is in the heart of Beaumont Leys, the school serves some of the city's most economically and educationally deprived areas, and although GCSE performance was poor in the past, the school is improving with a 2007 Ofsted inspection rating the school as Grade 2 Good overall. The new building and improving image of the school has seen not only GCSE results rise every year (68% grade A*-C in 2010) but a 2010 ofsted inspection rated the school as 'Good with outstanding elements'.

== New School ==
Beaumont Leys school was not always the building it is today but was part of the Building Schools for the Future scheme and as a result a brand new building was designed and opened in early 2009. The £14,000,000 school won two awards at the PfS (Partnerships for Schools) awards one being the BSF Excellence award and the other the BSF Grand Prix excellence award. The new school is painted in a multitude of different colours, including red, blue, green, pink, yellow and orange, which serve to make it a much brighter and engaging environment. Features of note are the dance studio, drama hall, main hall, two main entrances and multi-thousand pound equipment. In 2021 over 70% of the students that sat their GCSES passed, with all students getting on average 1 grade higher than expected.

== Royal Visit ==
On 29 March 2010, His Royal Highness, The Earl of Wessex flew in by helicoptering to the school. This was due to the school having one of the highest completion rates in the Duke of Edinburgh Award at Bronze level within the East Midlands. Prince Edward is the Patron of the Duke of Edinburgh scheme, and was impressed by the commitment of the students to the scheme. During his visit the students were demonstrating some of the skills required to achieve the Bronze award including pitching tents, map reading and cooking.
