= Krishna Avanti Primary School, Harrow =

Location
- Camrose Avenue; Edgware, London, HA8 6ES; England; 51.6034°N 0.2804°W

Information
- Type: Academy
- Religious affiliation: Hindu
- Established: 2008
- Department for Education URN: 138688 Tables
- Ofsted: Reports
- Gender: Mixed
- Age: 3 to 11
- Website: Official site

The Krishna Avanti Primary School, Harrow, is Britain's first state-funded Hindu school. Krishna Avanti Primary School is also the name of a second primary school in Leicester, which opened in September 2011.

== History ==
Krishna Avanti Primary School opened in borrowed space in nearby Little Stanmore School in September 2008. A permanent location was built at the William Ellis Playing Fields in Edgware, suggested to Avanti Schools Trust as a possible site by Harrow Council, opening in September 2009. In January 2010, the school held an event for the press to see the new school. The Queen visited the school for her Diamond Jubilee in Harrow.

The School opened with a single form, a Reception class, and will add one form each year until 2016 when it will have the nursery and 210 primary school pupils. The school is already four times oversubscribed and the Guardian reported that "I-Foundation is considering two locations for a secondary – one in London and the other in Leicester – and anticipates a similar level of demand for places."

The school became an academy in September 2012.

== Campus ==
Krishna Avanti Primary School's campus layout and design was informed by Vastu Shastra. The architectural design was done by the firm Cottrell & Vermeulen. The grounds include a temple built from hand-carved Makrana marble from Rajasthan, a meditation garden and an outdoor amphitheatre.

== See also ==
- International Society for Krishna Consciousness
