= Special Olympics Great Britain =

Sporting organisation for people with intellectual disabilities

- Sport: Special Olympics
- Jurisdiction: England, Scotland, Wales
- Founded: 1978
- Headquarters: London
- President: Lawrie McMenemy
- Chairman: Paul Richardson
- CEO: Laura Baxter MBE (Interim)
- Vice president: Paul Anderson

Official website
- www.specialolympicsgb.org.uk
- (United Kingdom)

Special Olympics Great Britain (SOGB) is a sporting organisation for children and adults with intellectual disabilities that operates in England, Scotland and Wales. It is part of the global Special Olympics movement. Great Britain is represented at the Special Olympics World Games and the Special Olympics Great Britain National Games are held on a four year cycle.

== History ==
Initially known as Special Olympics UK, it was founded in 1978 by Chris Maloney MBE and at the time, was one of the first European programmes of the international Special Olympics movement. Special Olympics GB was established on 8 August 1979, the year Great Britain made its début at the Special Olympics World Games in Brockport, United States.

== Organisation ==
Special Olympics GB creates opportunities for children and adults with learning (intellectual) disabilities to take part in various sports training and competition year-round.

Special Olympics is often confused with the Paralympics, which is for elite athletes with physical and/or intellectual disabilities.

To be eligible to take part in the Special Olympics GB programmes, participants would have to have an IQ of 75 and below. There are currently 140 Special Olympics clubs in Great Britain, run by over 4,000 volunteers, and involving 10,000 athletes who benefit from taking regular sport training and competitions programmes.

Special Olympics GB has a charitable status and has been receiving donations and funding from individuals as well as corporate partners. National Grid, Coca-Cola GB, ABB and Lions Clubs International are some of the long-term official partners of the charity.

Special Olympic GB Ambassadors from the world of sports and entertainment help to raise funds and build awareness of the charity's work throughout Great Britain.

Special Olympics GB includes former Southampton football manager Lawrie McMenemy, Olympic Champion athlete Darren Campbell, former NBA basketball legend John Amaechi, TV beauty and style guru Armand Beasley.

Special Olympics GB offers 28 different individual and team sports that provide meaningful training and competition opportunities for people with intellectual (learning) disabilities.

Special Olympics GB has an extensive network of clubs operating in 19 regions throughout England, Scotland and Wales.

All the clubs and competitions are run solely by an army of dedicated volunteers.

== Great Britain at the Special Olympics World Games ==
Athletes representing Great Britain have participated in both the summer and the winter editions of the Special Olympics World Games.

=== Summer ===
Games	Athletes
(Republic of Ireland) Dublin 2003	193
(China) Shanghai 2007	156
(Greece) Athens 2011	149
(United States) Los Angeles 2015	112
(United Arab Emirates) Abu Dhabi 2019	127
(Germany) Berlin 2023	82

=== Winter ===
Games	Athletes
(United States) Idaho 2009	10
(South Korea) Pyongchang 2013	7
(Austria) Graz and Schladming 2017	21
(Russia) Kazan 2022	Cancelled
(Italy) Turin 2025	Future event

== Special Olympics Great Britain National Games ==
The Special Olympics Great Britain National Games are held every four years. The 2021 edition was postponed as a result of the global COVID-19 pandemic and a venue and dates are to be determined.

=== Editions ===
Edition	Year	Host city	Start date	End date
I	1982	Liverpool		
II	1986	Brighton and Hove		
III	1989	Leicester		
IV	1993	Sheffield	20 August	26 August
V	1997	Portsmouth	28 June	5 July
VI	2001	Cardiff	28 July	7 August
VII	2005	Glasgow	2 July	9 July
VIII	2009	Leicester	25 July	31 July
IX	2013	Bath	28 August	1 September
X	2017	Sheffield	7 August	12 August
XI	2026	Birmingham	27 August	30 August

=== Teams ===
Athletes compete as part of twelve regional teams; East Midlands, East of England, Greater London, North West England, Northern England, Scotland, South East England, South West England, Southern England, Wales, West Midlands, Yorkshire and the Humber.
