= Avanti Schools Trust =

Sponsor of Hindu schools in the United Kingdom

Avanti School Trust
- Seal of the School Trust.
- Nickname: I-Foundation
- Formation: February 2010; 16 years ago
- Type: Trust of Faith schools
- Legal status: Active
- Headquarters: London, England and Wales
- Parent organization: ISKCON
- Website: Official website

Avanti Schools Trust is the sponsor of state-funded Hindu faith schools in the United Kingdom. The I-Foundation is a Hindu and ISKCON charity in England and Wales that is the religious authority governing schools run by the Avanti Schools Trust.

Prior to the founding of schools by the I-Foundation, Hinduism was the only major world religion which did not have a dedicated faith school in the UK. The I-Foundation founded the first Hindu faith school in London to be funded by the government. The Krishna Avanti school opened in February 2010. The organisation has since opened additional Hindu faith schools, with more schools planned for development.

== Admission ==
Admission to schools is open to students having a Hindu faith background as well as students of other faiths.

Concerns had initially surfaced surrounding the first I-Foundation school's classification of the term "Hindu" or "practising Hindu" in relation to student families. However, Krishna Avanti Primary School appropriately responded to these concerns by revising the admissions policy to accommodate a less stringent definition of the term "practising Hindu" and left the responsibility for determination of the "practising Hindu" status of a prospective student's family to local Hindu temple priests.

== Curriculum ==
Avanti schools aim to promote "educational excellence, character formation and spiritual insight." Avanti schools follow the standard national curriculum of the government-run schools of the United Kingdom. In addition to the standard curriculum, Avanti schools feature Sanskrit language teaching, meditation and yoga practice, ethics and philosophy education, and inclusive religious instruction. Religious education is evenly split between Hinduism and other world religions.

== Schools ==
The Avanti Schools Trust and the I-Foundation operate primary and secondary schools.

=== Primary schools ===
==== Krishna Avanti Primary School, Harrow ====
Krishna Avanti Primary School, Harrow is the first state-funded Hindu faith school in the United Kingdom, operating in the London borough of Harrow. Krishna Avanti Primary School opened in February 2010. In its initial year, all students of the school met government targets for education.

==== Krishna Avanti Primary School, Leicester ====
A second school, also with the name Krishna Avanti Primary School, opened in Leicester in September 2011. The school is the second Hindu faith primary school in the United Kingdom, and the first state-funded Hindu school in Leicester. The school is open to students of Hindu background, but half (50%) of places available in the school are also reserved for local students of various faith backgrounds.

==== Krishna Avanti Primary School, Croydon ====
Krishna Avanti Primary School, Croydon is a Hindu faith primary school, to be located in the London borough of Croydon. The Avanti Schools Trust has already found an ideal site for the school.

==== Avanti Court Primary School, Redbridge ====
Avanti Court Primary School is the third Hindu faith primary school in London, operating in the London borough of Redbridge.

==== Former Steiner-Waldorf schools ====
At the end of 2019, three schools in the West Country, all formerly Steiner-Waldorf schools were taken over by the Avanti Schools Trust. Those schools are Avanti Gardens in Bristol, Avanti Hall in Exeter and Avanti Park in Frome.

=== Secondary schools ===
==== Avanti Fields, Leicester ====
Avanti Fields School opened in September 2018 in temporary accommodation in the Narborough Road area of Leicester. The school moved to move to a purpose built site in the Humberstone area of the city in September 2021.

==== Avanti House Secondary School, Harrow ====
Avanti House Secondary School is the first Hindu faith secondary school in the United Kingdom, operating in the London borough of Harrow. It had no permanent building between 2012 and 2018, however the school is now based on Wemborough Road. In 2024, Avanti House Secondary earned a prestigious spot among the schools nominated for the title of World's Best School.

=== Planned schools ===
==== Gants Hill School, Redbridge ====
Gants Hill School is a planned Hindu faith secondary school, to be located in the London borough of Redbridge. The Avanti Schools Trust has already found and earmarked an ideal site for the school.

== Partnerships ==
The I-Foundation has a partnership with Bhaktivedanta College, a Vaishnava university run by ISKCON in the Radhadesh spiritual community of Belgium offering degree programmes externally validated by the University of Chester, whereby students in the Education degree programmes may undertake teacher's training and placement in Avanti schools.
