= Samworth Church Academy =

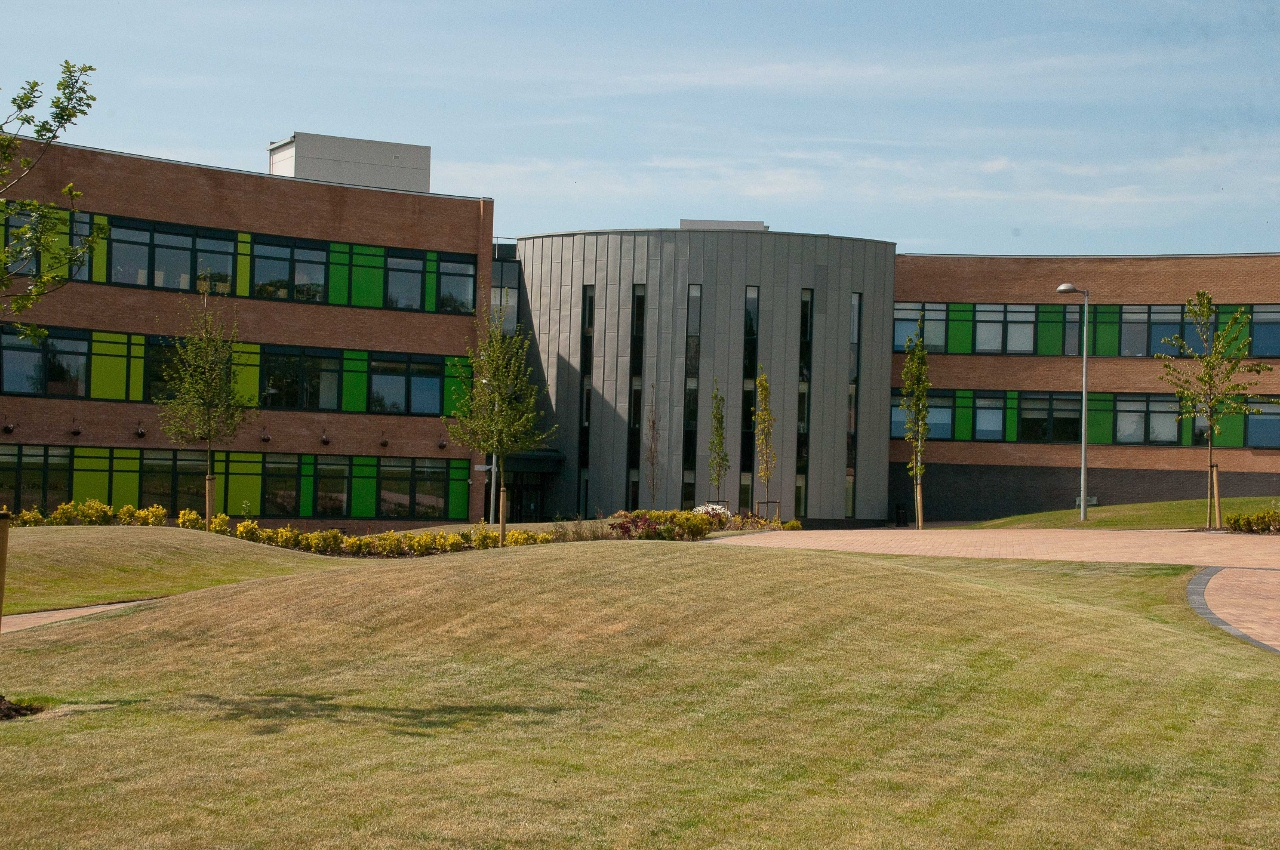
- The Samworth Church Academy

Location
- Sherwood Hall Road; Mansfield, Nottinghamshire, NG18 2DY; England; 53.1476°N 1.1711°W

Information
- Type: Academy
- Religious affiliation: Church of England
- Established: Technical School 1945; Secondary School 1957; Academy from 2008
- Department for Education URN: 135583 Tables
- Ofsted: Reports
- Chair of the Executive Board: Zarina Connolly
- Head of Academy: Carl Bennett
- Associate Governor: Clare Barber
- Gender: Unisex
- Age: 11 to 19
- Colours: Red and Black
- Website: Samworth Church Academy

The Academy buildings on Sherwood Hall Road in 2018

The Samworth Church Academy is a co-educational secondary school and sixth form with academy status, located in Mansfield in the English county of Nottinghamshire. The name was applied from 2008.

== Early history ==
The school was established as "The Mansfield Secondary Technical School", which opened in 1945. It was housed in Nissen huts left over by a U.S. Army Hospital after the end of World War II on the outskirts of Mansfield, occupying the same site used by the current King's Mill Hospital.

The school moved to new premises on the opposite side of Mansfield in 1957, becoming known as "Sherwood Hall Secondary School".

In 1958 "The Sherwood Hall School for Girls" was opened, later known as Sherwood Hall Technical School for Girls. Sherwood Hall Technical Grammar School For Boys moved to the site in 1961.

=== Comprehensive school ===
The two technical-grammar schools merged in 1976 to become Sherwood Hall Upper School, a coeducational comprehensive school. In 2001 it became Sherwood Hall School and Sixth Form College.

== Recent history ==
Previously a community school administered by Nottinghamshire County Council, Sherwood Hall School converted to academy status on 1 September 2008 and was renamed The Samworth Church Academy. The academy's first year results were promising, showing a 25% increase in 'A' level and GCSE achievements.

The school is sponsored by the Diocese of Southwell and Nottingham of the Church of England, and businessman, the late Sir David Samworth, but continues to coordinate with Nottinghamshire County Council for admissions.

=== Samworth new school ===
Shortly after converting from a school to academy, in December 2008 planning consent was obtained to erect a new, high, large building upon open space on the opposite side of the site close to the boundary and overlooking rear gardens of nearby residential streets, which angered the owners. The new construction was funded by central government. Pupils started at the new building in September 2010.

A Founders Day was held in April 2011. Also in early April 2011, the older school buildings, which were empty, were consumed by fire, the second at the site following arson by teenagers in March.

The new school was officially opened on 18 April 2011 by Princess Anne, the Princess Royal.

In 2022, a special neurodivergence zone named "Cubbie" was established as a calming sensory cubicle to aid SEND pupils.

In 2023, the school grounds were chosen by Severn Trent Water to host a rainwater-intervention basin, part of a district-wide scheme involving re-routing of surface water drainage to mitigate future flood risk.

== Curriculum ==
Samworth Church Academy offers GCSEs, BTECs and OCR Nationals as programmes of study for pupils, while students in the sixth form have the option to study from a range of A Levels and further BTECs.

== Notable former pupils ==
- Tony Egginton, former Mansfield Executive Mayor (2002–2015) attended the school from 1962–1967
- Corinne Hollingworth, TV producer, Executive Producer from 1994-96 of EastEnders, Controller of Drama from 1996-2003 at Channel 5, and Head of Continuing Series from 2004-08 at ITV

== See also ==
- Samworth Enterprise Academy, Leicester
