= Ellesmere College, Leicester =

Ellesmere College

Location
- 40 Braunstone Lane East; Leicester, Leicestershire, LE3 2FD; England; 52.618565°N 1.162223°W

Information
- Type: Community special school
- Established: 4 September 1995
- Local authority: Leicester
- Department for Education URN: 130371 Tables
- Ofsted: Reports
- Gender: Coeducational
- Age: 4 to 19
- Website: http://www.ellesmerecollege.org.uk/

Ellesmere College is a large special school on the outskirts of Leicester City with places for 426 students. The college caters for students aged 4–19 with a range of special educational needs ranging from moderate to severe and complex needs.

== History ==
Ellesmere College was opened by ex-Leicester City Football Club striker Gary Lineker on 4 September 1995, with Principal Fiona Moir and Vice Principal Dave Thomas at the launch of the new school.

In June 1997 Robbie Savage, ex-Leicester City player, handed over the keys to the first Ellesmere College minibus.

Ellesmere College was due to open on 28 August 1995 at Ellesmere Road but was delayed to 4 September 1995 as the building was not ready in time.

== Sites ==
- Ellesmere Road (4 September 1995 – 11 July 2014)
- Braunstone Lane East (3 September 2014 – Present)
- Knighton Fields Centre

(14 March 2022 – Present)

- The Rowans

It has been confirmed that Ellesmere College will move to the old Riverside Community College on Lyncote Road on 3 September 2014, Ellesmere will be leaving their old site at Ellesmere Road on 11 July 2014. From 3 September 2014 Ellesmere College will be a Community Special School from their new location at Braunstone Lane via Braunstone Lane East. Students move into new building on 3 September. Staff move to new building 11 August. New ages will be 4–19 from current 11–19 which runs out on 11 July 2014.

From January 2022 Ellesmere College will have 2nd site at The Rowans on Saxby Street, Leicester. It will take 60 sixth form students, ages 16–19.

From September 1, 2021, Ellesmere College will have 3 sites in total.
