= Crown Hills Community College =

Location
- Gwendolen Road; Leicester, Leicestershire, LE5 5FT; England
- 52.6284°N 1.0898°W

Information
- Type: Community College
- Motto: Aspiration, Commitment, Success
- Local authority: Leicester
- Department for Education URN: 120277 Tables
- Principal: Farhan Adam
- Age: 11 to 16
- Website: http://www.crownhills.com/

Crown Hills Community College (CHCC) is a secondary school in Leicester, England with more than 1500 pupils and more than 200 staff members.

Crown Hills is a sports college and with a large field for sports, especially the football grounds called Goals.

== History ==
The school was founded in 1950. It was subsequently redeveloped under the government's Building Schools for the Future programme, with new facilities completed in the early 2010s and the former buildings demolished in 2014.

== Facilities ==
Crown Hills Community College has modern educational facilities organised into multiple learning zones, as well as outdoor study areas. The school is designated as a specialist sports college and has extensive sports infrastructure, including large playing fields and an on-site football complex known as Goals Leicester, which features all-weather pitches used for both school and community activities.
