= Emmanuel Christian School, Leicester =

School in Leicestershire, England

Emmanuel Christian School

Location
- Didsbury Street, Braunstone; Leicester, Leicestershire, LE3 1QP; England
- 52°37′35″N 1°11′01″W

Information
- Motto: To Know Him, To Love Him, To Walk In His Way
- Religious affiliation: Christianity
- Established: 28 August 2003
- Department for Education URN: 134595 Tables
- Ofsted: Reports
- Headteacher: A Harris
- Gender: co-educational
- Age: 4 to 16
- Enrolment: 50
- Colours: Navy Blue and Red
- Website: www.leicesterchristianschool.org

Emmanuel Christian School, Leicester, is a small, independent, co-educational Christian school for pupils aged 4–16. Opened on 28 August 2003, it was the first (and remains the only according to Ofsted and government records) independent Christian school in Leicestershire. The school is registered in Didsbury Street, Braunstone in Leicester.
