= Rushey Mead Academy =

Location
- Melton Road; Leicester, Leicestershire, LE4 7AN; England
- Coordinates: 52°39′45″N 1°06′43″W

Information
- Type: Academy
- Motto: Make A Positive Difference
- Department for Education URN: 141916 Tables
- Ofsted: Reports
- Chair of Governors: Sally Cox
- Chief Executive Officer: Carolyn Robson CBE
- Head of School: Victoria Barwell
- Gender: Mixed
- Age: 11 to 16
- Enrolment: 1,800
- Houses: Belvoir, Bosworth, Charnwood, Harborough, Melton & Rutland
- Colours: Royal Blue, Red, Yellow, Purple and Green
- Website: https://www.rushey-tmet.uk

Rushey Mead Academy, previously known as Rushey Mead School, is a mixed secondary school located in Leicester, Leicestershire, England for students aged 11 to 16. It is part of The Mead Educational Trust which also includes Orchard Mead Academy. It was named as the best state-funded secondary school in Leicester and Leicestershire in 2018.

== Academic achievement ==
In its November 2007 Ofsted report, the school was rated "outstanding" for overall effectiveness. In 2009, Ofsted highlighted it as one of 12 outstanding schools serving disadvantaged communities.

The Real Schools Guide 2018 named Rushey Mead Academy the best state-funded secondary school in Leicester and Leicestershire.

== Notable former pupils ==
- Jigar Naik — Leicestershire cricketer
- Tony Sibson — boxer
- Mark Morrison — R&B singer
- Chris Pyatt — boxer, former world middleweight champion
