= Tudor Grange Samworth Academy, A Church of England School =

Location
- Trenant Road; Leicester, Leicestershire, LE2 6UA; England; 52.5931°N 1.1389°W

Information
- Type: Academy
- Motto: A place for all to flourish
- Religious affiliation: Church of England
- Established: 2007
- Department for Education URN: 144479 Tables
- Ofsted: Reports
- Principal: Aiden Bannon
- Gender: Coeducational
- Age: 3 to 18
- Website: http://www.samworth.tgacademy.org.uk/

Tudor Grange Samworth Academy, A Church of England School, previously known as Samworth Enterprise Academy, is a school with Academy status located in Leicester, England. It is a co-educational school for 3-16 year olds that specialises in Food, Business and Enterprise. The school was created on the site of the Mary Linwood Comprehensive School which closed in 1997. It opened in 2007 under the co-sponsorship of the Church of England and businessman Sir David Samworth, and incorporates a fully functioning church.

The school became part of the Tudor Grange Academies Trust in January 2016.

== Concerns and criticism ==
=== Inadequate rating and special measures ===
In September 2014, after poor GCSE results, the original head Pat Dubas resigned, and a new interim head was appointed. An Ofsted report in June 2015, classified the school as "inadequate in almost all areas" and placing it into special measures. The school was rated "inadequate" again in October 2018.

=== Alleged malpractice ===
In July 2016, a whistleblower alleged that the members of staff had been engaging in malpractice by helping students during GCSE examinations and having access to examination papers prior to the start of public examinations. The claims are currently being investigated by the Joint Council for Qualifications.

== OFSTED Inspections ==
After a flurry of monitoring visits to confirm that the school was indeed moving in the right direction, in November 2021, OFSTED returned and carried out a full section 5 inspection finding that the school had rapidly improved in all areas to GOOD and is now categorised as a GOOD school. OFSTED noted that 'Leaders and staff build the school’s values of tolerance, unity, democracy, opportunity and respect (TUDOR) into all aspects of the school’s work. Pupils say that they are safe and happy at school. They are very well cared for by staff, who are proud to work at this school.'

== See also ==
- Samworth Church Academy
