= Babington Academy =

Location
- Strasbourg Drive, Beaumont Leys; Leicester, Leicestershire, LE4 0SZ; England; 52.6615°N 1.1598°W

Information
- Former name: Babington Community College
- Type: Academy
- Local authority: Leicester City Council
- Trust: Learning without Limits Academy Trust
- Department for Education URN: 143247 Tables
- Ofsted: Reports
- Principal: Fiona Laywood
- Gender: Mixed
- Age range: 11–16
- Enrolment: 1,273 (2020)
- Capacity: 1,050
- Website: www.babington.leicester.sch.uk

Babington Academy (formerly Babington Community College) is an 11–16 mixed secondary school with academy status in Beaumont Leys, Leicester, Leicestershire, England. It is part of the Learning without Limits Academy Trust.

The school relocated to a new building on the same site in September 2014.

== Notable alumni ==
Babington Community College

- Gok Wan, fashion consultant, author and television presenter
