= Soar Valley College =

Location
- Gleneagles Avenue; Leicester, Leicestershire, LE4 7GY; England
- Coordinates: 52°39′36″N 1°06′24″W

Information
- Type: Academy
- Motto: Aspire, Enjoy, Achieve
- Local authority: Leicester City Council
- Trust: Aspire Learning Partnership
- Department for Education URN: 120286 Tables
- Ofsted: Reports
- Principal: Julie Robinson
- Gender: Coeducational
- Age range: 11-16
- Enrolment: 1,561 (May 2023)
- Colours: Black and yellow
- Website: www.soarvalley.leicester.sch.uk

Soar Valley College is an 11–16 coeducational secondary school located in Leicester, Leicestershire, England.

It was designated a Maths and Computing specialist college in September 2004.

As part of the Building Schools for the Future initiative, the old building was demolished in 2009 and turned into playing fields, and a new building was built on the previous playing fields at a cost of approximately £21.5 million. The school hosted the Special Olympics netball games in 2009 on their newly built netball courts, known as the "Soar Valley Netball Centre" on the other side of the campus from the new building.

It became co-educational in 2016 and has one acre of land. The school has a lanyard system with different colours to show the different years.

Previously a community school administered by Leicester City Council, in June 2023 Soar Valley College converted to academy status. The school is now sponsored by the Aspire Learning Partnership.

== Notable former pupils ==
- Parminder Nagra, actress
- Shivani Raja, politician
- Rakhee Thakrar, actress
