= Krishna Avanti Primary School, Leicester =

Location
- Spencefield Lane; Leicester, LE5 6HN; England; 52.62844°N 1.1157805°W

Information
- Type: Free school
- Religious affiliation: Hinduism
- Established: 2011
- Department for Education URN: 136930 Tables
- Ofsted: Reports
- Gender: Mixed
- Age: 3 to 11
- Website: http://www.kapsleicester.org.uk/

Krishna Avanti Primary School, Leicester is a Hindu faith primary school in Leicester, United Kingdom that is part of the Avanti Schools Trust. It was the first state-funded Hindu school in Leicester. The school is open to students of Hindu background, but half (50%) of places available in the school are also reserved for local students of various faith backgrounds. The school is based at Evington Hall, a Grade II listed building, built about 1840, which in the past was a convent school, then part of Leicester Junior Grammar School.

== See also ==
- Avanti Fields School
- International Society for Krishna Consciousness
