= Beaumont Leys =

Suburb and electoral ward in north-western Leicester, England

Coordinates: 52.666°N 1.154°W

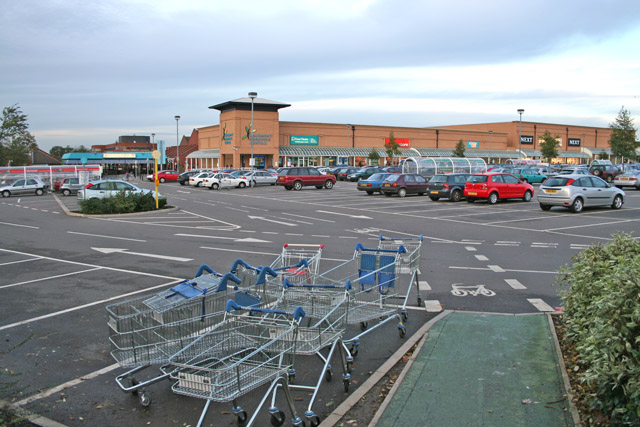
- Beaumont Leys Shopping Centre in November 2005

- Unitary authority: Leicester
- Ceremonial county: Leicestershire
- Region: East Midlands
- Country: England
- Sovereign state: United Kingdom
- Post town: LEICESTER
- Postcode district: LE4
- Dialling code: 0116
- Police: Leicestershire
- Fire: Leicestershire
- Ambulance: East Midlands
- UK Parliament: Leicester West

Beaumont Leys is a suburb of Leicester, in the ceremonial county of Leicestershire, England. The population of the ward during the 2021 census was 18,808, rising from 16,480 in the 2011 census. Locally, Beaumont Leys is usually used in reference to the large housing estate, built within the administrative division, centred on Strasbourg Drive.

== Geography ==
Beaumont Leys is located within the city boundary of Leicester, although prior to the 2011 census, the Office for National Statistics considered Beaumont Leys as an environ, distinct from the city. Beaumont Leys is bordered by the wards of Abbey to the east, Fosse to the south-east and New Parks to the south. North and west of the area are the Leicestershire villages of Anstey and Glenfield.

== History ==
The word 'Beaumont' means 'beautiful hill/mountain'.

The area before the 1970s was mainly farmland and a sewage system, however started to be invested in by the council and local private housing companies. The area was largely developed from the 1970s onwards, and continues to expand into the surrounding countryside. It includes several large housing estates, industrial areas (including the main factory for Walkers) and a large area of modern housing, with large parts divided up into smaller estates such as Anstey Heights, Thurcaston Park, Ashton Green and Verdant Rise.

Newer areas of Beaumont Leys include the Anstey Heights, towards Castle Hill Park and the village of Anstey, as well as the Thurcaston Park housing developments on the North side of Beaumont Leys and Bradgate Heights on the land surrounded by Glenfield, Anstey and Beaumont Leys. The Thurcaston Park development is expected to have 2000 homes once the estate is finished.

=== Civil parish ===
Beaumont Leys was formerly an extra-parochial tract, from 1858 Beaumont Leys was a civil parish in its own right until it was abolished on 1 April 1935 and merged with Leicester, parts also went to Anstey and Thurcaston. In 1931 the parish had a population of 169.

== Amenities and facilities ==
The Beaumont Shopping Centre is the main facility, one of the largest shopping areas in the city suburbs. There is also a church, a large leisure centre, a library and a police station nearby. Smaller shopping precincts tend to be on land that was previously occupied by farms, such as the Astil Lodge shops. In 2023, Leicester City Council announced the closure of Beaumont Leys market.

There are also several schools including Babington Academy and Beaumont Leys School. The latter is now a specialised science school and was rebuilt in 2009 with a City Learning Centre built next to it.

Primary schools in the area include Beaumont Lodge Primary school, Heatherbrook primary school, Buswells Lodge Primary School and Glebelands primary school.

The area includes a large industrial estate, which includes the main Walkers Crisps factory and Office Depot alongside Trelleborg, as well as a smaller industrial estate to the south.

The Leicester Lions speedway team have their home track at Beaumont Park.

== Transport ==
Beaumont Leys is mainly served by two companies First in Leicester who operate routes;

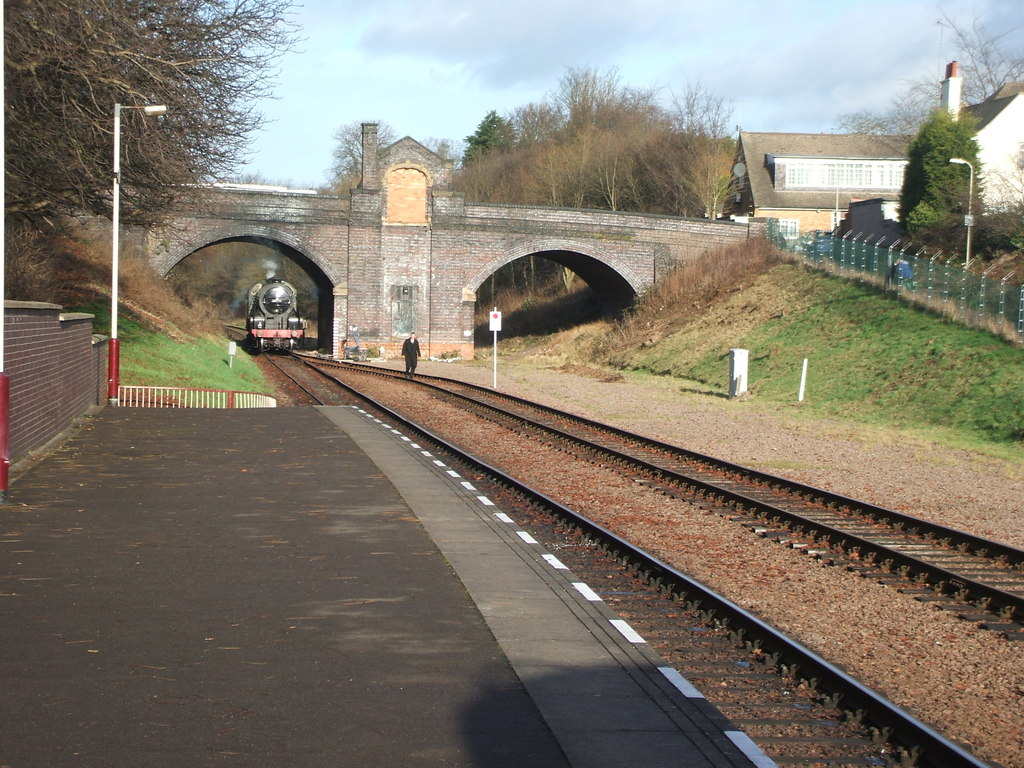
Leicester North Station

- 14A,
- 25/26,
- 54,
- 74.

And Centrebus who operate routes;

- 154,
- 40 (Orbital)
- HH (Hospital Hopper, formerly UHL)

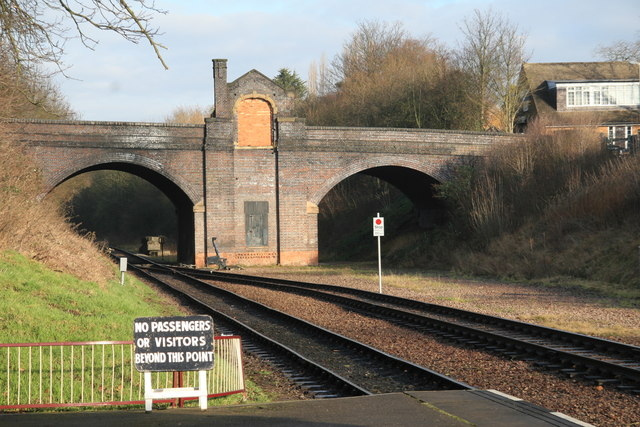
The remains of the Belgrave and Birstall station. Rebuilt as Leicester North just a few 100 yards south down the line.

The Heritage Railway "The Great Central Railway" also has a station in the area located in Mowmacre Hill named Leicester North which is rebuilt just south of the previous station on the site Belgrave and Birstall railway station. They operate a seasonal service with plans to reconnect to the East Midlands Mainline in Loughborough.

The A46 trunk road bypasses Beaumont Leys through Castle Hill Country Park and is accessible by the Anstey Junction. The A46 leads on to the M1.

== People ==
- Gok Wan attended Babington Academy in the Beaumont Leys area in the 1990's.
