= Haymarket =

Haymarket may refer to:

== Places ==
=== Australia ===
- Haymarket, New South Wales, area of Sydney, Australia

=== Germany ===
- Heumarkt (KVB), transport interchange in Cologne on the site of the Heumarkt (literally: hay market)

=== Poland ===
- Hay Market Square (Szczecin), an urban square in Szczecin, Poland

=== Russia ===
- Sennaya Square (Hay Square), Saint Petersburg

=== Sweden ===
- Hötorget, or Haymarket, city square in the center of Stockholm

=== United Kingdom ===
- Haymarket, London, a street in Westminster, London
- Theatre Royal Haymarket, theatre in London
- Haymarket, Newcastle, area in Newcastle upon Tyne
  - Haymarket bus station, Newcastle upon Tyne, bus station in Newcastle upon Tyne
  - Haymarket Metro station, Metro station in Newcastle upon Tyne
- Haymarket, Sheffield, a street in Yorkshire
- Haymarket, Edinburgh, area of Edinburgh
  - Haymarket railway station, railway station in Edinburgh
- Haymarket Shopping Centre, shopping centre in Leicester
- Leicester Haymarket Theatre, theatre in Leicester
- Haymarket bus station, Leicester, the main bus station for Leicester

=== United States ===
- Haymarket, Virginia, town in Prince William County, Virginia
- Haymarket Square (Boston), a city square in Boston, Massachusetts
  - Haymarket - Boston, an open-air market several blocks from the historic square
  - Haymarket (MBTA station), a metro station in Boston
  - Haymarket Theatre, theatre in Boston
- Haymarket Square (Chicago), a commercial area in Chicago, Illinois
- Haymarket (Louisville), former outdoor farmer's market in Louisville, Kentucky
- Haymarket District (Lincoln, Nebraska), historic area in Lincoln, Nebraska

== Others ==
- Haymarket affair, 1886 incident at Haymarket Square in Chicago, Illinois
- Haymarket Books, non-profit publisher of left-wing literature in the United States
- Haymarket Media Group, a global media company
