= Orbital (bus service) =

Circular bus route in Leicester, UK

Orbital (40)
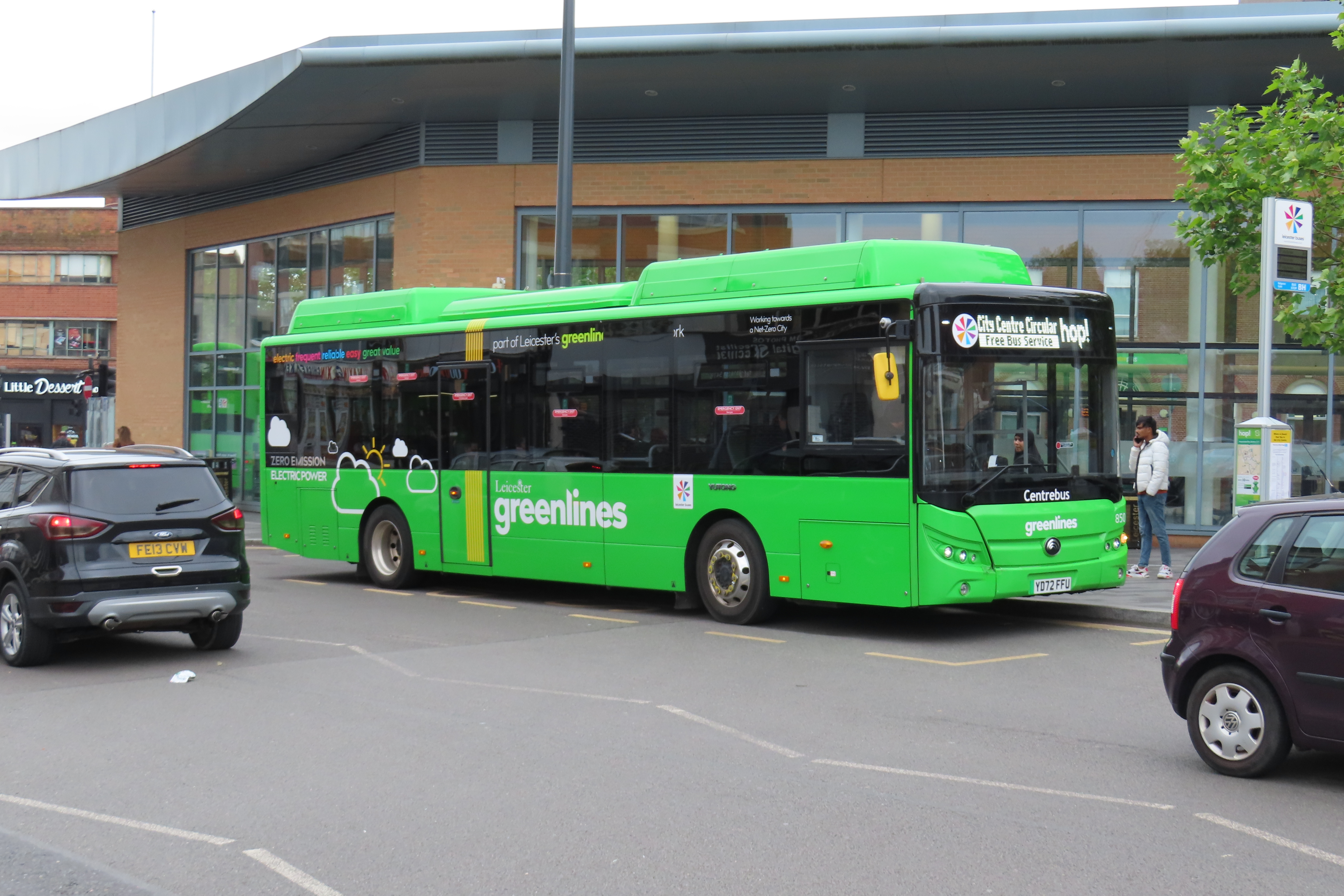
- Greenlines branded Yutong E10

Overview
- Operator: Centrebus
- Vehicle: Yutong E10
- Peak vehicle requirement: 6

Route
- Communities served: Leicester General Hospital, Oadby, Wigston Magna, Eyres Monsell, Aylestone, Fosse Park, Thorpe Astley, Braunstone Frith, Glenfield, Glenfield Hospital, Beaumont Shopping Centre, Mowmacre Hill, Gipsy Lane, Hamilton, Netherhall Road, Thurnby Lodge and Goodwood Road

Service
- Frequency: upto every hour on both services

Orbital is the name given to Centrebus services 40N and 40S which operate around the outer suburbs in Leicester, UK.

== History ==
Centrebus have operated the 40 service since around 2003 but the history can be traced back to the early 1980s.

As part of the Leicester bus partnership, Centrebus and Leicester City Council successfully applied for ZEBRA funding for electric vehicles to operate on service 40, these were launched on 24 October 2022.

The previous fully circular route was 30 miles (48 kilometres) long and formed a circle around Leicester. In March 2025, Centrebus announced changes to the service with it being split into two routes from 27 April in a bid to improve the reliability.

== Route ==
The Orbital services currently operates as two separate services 40N and 40S in a bid to improve reliability across the service

Orbital services both currently operate to an hourly frequency Monday to Saturday, serving the housing, retail, and business areas around the A563 Outer Ring Road.

=== Future ===
As part of the Leicester Buses partnership, Leicester City Council are seeking funding to increase the frequency to every 30 minutes alongside the introduction of (less frequent) evening and Sunday services with additional electric buses.

== Vehicles ==
Orbital is currently operated by six Yutong E10 buses all in a distinctive bright green livery with four of them having full Orbital branding alongside two branded for Leicester Greenlines? these vehicles are used as spare vehicles for use on Hop! or the Hospital Hopper services.

Centrebus have previously used a number of Dennis Darts on the service. In 2007 Optare Esteem buses were launched onto the route and these were replaced by Optare Solo SRs in 2016.
