= Glen Parva =

Civil parish in Leicestershire, England

Coordinates: 52°35.2′N 1°09.7′W

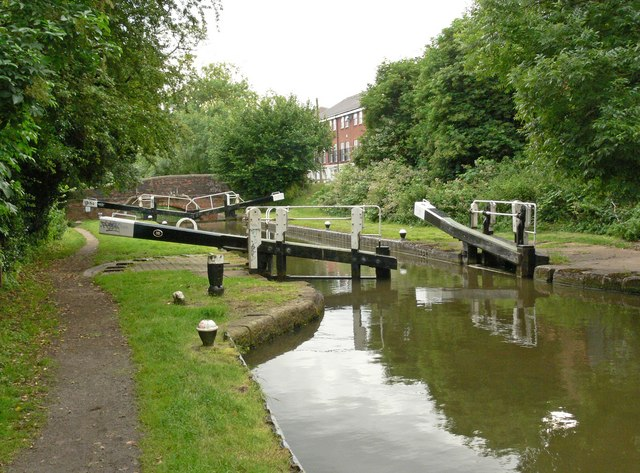
- Whetstone Lane lock on the Grand Union Canal

- Location within Leicestershire
- Population: 17,189
- District: Blaby
- Shire county: Leicestershire
- Region: East Midlands
- Country: England
- Sovereign state: United Kingdom
- Post town: LEICESTER
- Postcode district: LE2
- Dialling code: 0116
- Police: Leicestershire
- Fire: Leicestershire
- Ambulance: East Midlands
- UK Parliament: South Leicestershire

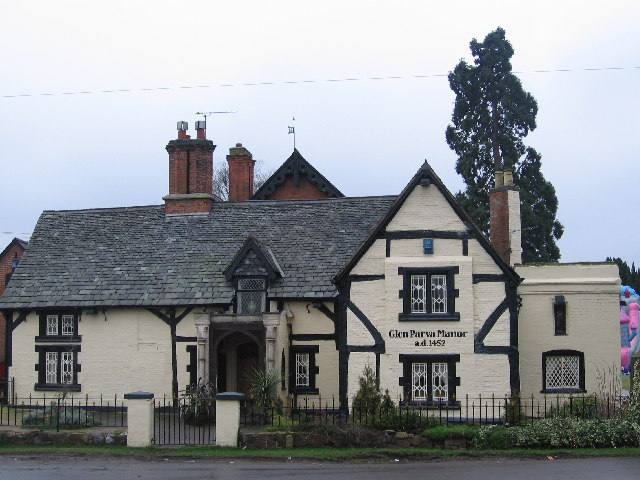
Glen Parva Manor on little Glen Road

Glen Parva is a civil parish in the Blaby district of Leicestershire, England, with a population of over 17,000. The population of the civil parish, including Eyres Monsell was 17,189 in the 2011 census. To the north it runs into Aylestone and to the east South Wigston. To the south and west, it is not immediately adjacent to development.

Eyres Monsell forms part of the City Of Leicester District. It is included in the Parish of Glen Parva, the southern part of Eyres Monsell only, from south of Sturdee road. Glen Parva forms part of the Leicester Urban Area due to its close proximity to Leicester City Centre. Glen Parva is in the Saxondale ward of Leicestershire. Glen Parva with Eyres Monsell is 4.5 miles south of Leicester city centre, one mile southeast of the Fosse Shopping Park in Enderby and half a mile from Blaby.

It is a largely residential area without main shopping or leisure centres, although it is situated next to Fosse Shopping Park, one of Britain's largest out-of-town shopping parks. There are a few small shops located in Glen Parva itself, mainly located at Carvers Corner where there is a newsagent, off licence, post office, chemist, barbers, cob shop and accountant. In the surrounding area, there is a beautician and another off licence as well as a members' only working men's club.

== History ==
The original settlement was undoubtedly near The Ford by the River Sence, which is known locally as Glen Ford. There is strong evidence of the existence of a medieval village in this area. Glen Parva ("little Glen") is called so to distinguish it from Great Glen, rarely Glen Magna. Under the Local Government Act 1894, Glen Parva became a civil parish within the rural District of Blaby. Previously it was included in the Aylestone Ecclesiastical Parish. Glen Parva Barracks, which became an important military installation in the 1960s, were opened in 1881.

Eyres Monsell became included in the parish of Glen Parva when the area of land was purchased by Bolton-Eyres Monsell, an area that is named after him. The land was originally owned by Glen Parva Parish Council, so they are responsible along with Leicester City Council for everything in the area. Therefore, Eyres Monsell is an Urban District Of Leicester and is included In the Leicester Urban Area.

Carvers Corner is named after the Carver family, specifically Stephen James Harold Carver and his eldest son Stephen Graham Carver, who owned the row and ran the post office and newsagents until the late 1980s.

== Amenities ==
On the local park there are several facilities including recreational equipment, an astroturf pitch with a football goal and basketball hoop, a library and a recently extended and modernised memorial hall. The hall can now host parties, wedding receptions and other events with its improved facilities. There is a Scout hut located around the back of the hall which is home to the local 62nd Leicester Scout group.

The village has two nurseries and Glen Hill Primary School, which was once split into two campuses: one based at Cork Lane and the other on Featherby Drive. It was decided that they would be combined on the Featherby site, and Cork Lane's was sold off for housing development.

The village had a young offenders' institute, HMYOI Glen Parva. Although this fell within the boundaries of Glen Parva in Blaby district it was separated from the main village by the Birmingham to Peterborough Railway Line. It could only be accessed from Tigers Road South Wigston in the borough of Oadby and Wigston. The Knightsbridge Road estate was built as accommodation for the prison officers working at HMYOI Glen Parva. The prison closed in June 2017, following an announcement at the end of 2016 that it would be replaced with a newly built category C adult prison. It has since been demolished and a new prison, HMP Fosse Way, was opened on the site in 2023. The Knightsbridge Road estate now has nothing to do with the prison and the houses are all privately owned.

There is still a footbridge over the railway which can be accessed via an overgrown footpath behind the houses at the end of Knightsbridge Road. This bridge was used to access the young offenders institute from the estate but it is no longer in use and has a locked security gate halfway across preventing access to the prison's perimeter fence.

Eyres Monsell contains two primary schools, Eyres Monsell Primary School and Rollsten Primary School. The pork pie library was once a part of the old Eyres Monsell ward. It is now a part of the Saffron ward in the city of Leicester, along with Saffron Road and all the roads leading down to Wigston Magna.

== Landmarks ==
The Grand Union Canal and the River Sence both pass to the south of the village. To the west is the River Soar. The Great Central Railway used to pass through Glen Parva. The route has now been made into a paved Shared path, being part of the National Cycle Network - route 6 which leads directly into Leicester's city centre, which is popular for walking and cycling and is used by horse riders.

Glen Parva Local Nature Reserve is east of the village.

== Well-known residents ==
- Robert Cruickshank - World War One Victoria Cross winner lived for many years in Glen Parva until his death.
- Tom Ford - Snooker player was born in Glen Parva.
- Jonathan Morgan - Semi professional association football player and later Leicester City W.F.C. manager resides in the village.
- Sue Townsend - Author who wrote the Adrian Mole books grew up in Glen Parva. It is speculated that many of the locations and characters in her books were based on local places and people.
