= Chubby Daniels =

Nigerian-born visual artist based in Leicester

- Born: Chukwubuikem Ndubuisi Daniels
- Known for: Works made from recycled materials; community workshops
- Website: sites.google.com/view/chubbydaniels

Chukwubuikem Ndubuisi Daniels (known professionally as Chubby Daniels) is a Nigerian-born visual artist based in Leicester, England. He creates works from discarded materials such as bottle caps, plastic, nails and scrap metal, and has organised community workshops under the name Trash to Art.

== Early life and education ==
Daniels moved to the United Kingdom from Nigeria and settled in Leicester. He studied civil engineering and later completed a master's degree in architecture and sustainability at De Montfort University. He has worked as an architect alongside his artistic practice.

== Artistic practice and Trash to Art ==
Daniels uses recycled materials including bottle caps, plastic and scrap items to create mixed-media works. BBC News reported on a portrait of the footballer Jamie Vardy made from bottle tops and a lion’s face constructed from waste materials.

In 2025 he organised Trash to Art, a series of free community workshops in Leicester funded by Arts Council England and De Montfort University. Participants worked with discarded materials collected locally. The project ended with a public exhibition at Haymarket Shopping Centre in November 2025.

Circular Online, published by the Chartered Institution of Wastes Management, described the project as an example of using creative workshops to engage people with ideas of reuse and the circular economy. Daniels is an associate member of the institution.

BBC Radio Leicester has also covered the workshops and related activities.
