= Hop! =

Circular bus route in Leicester, England

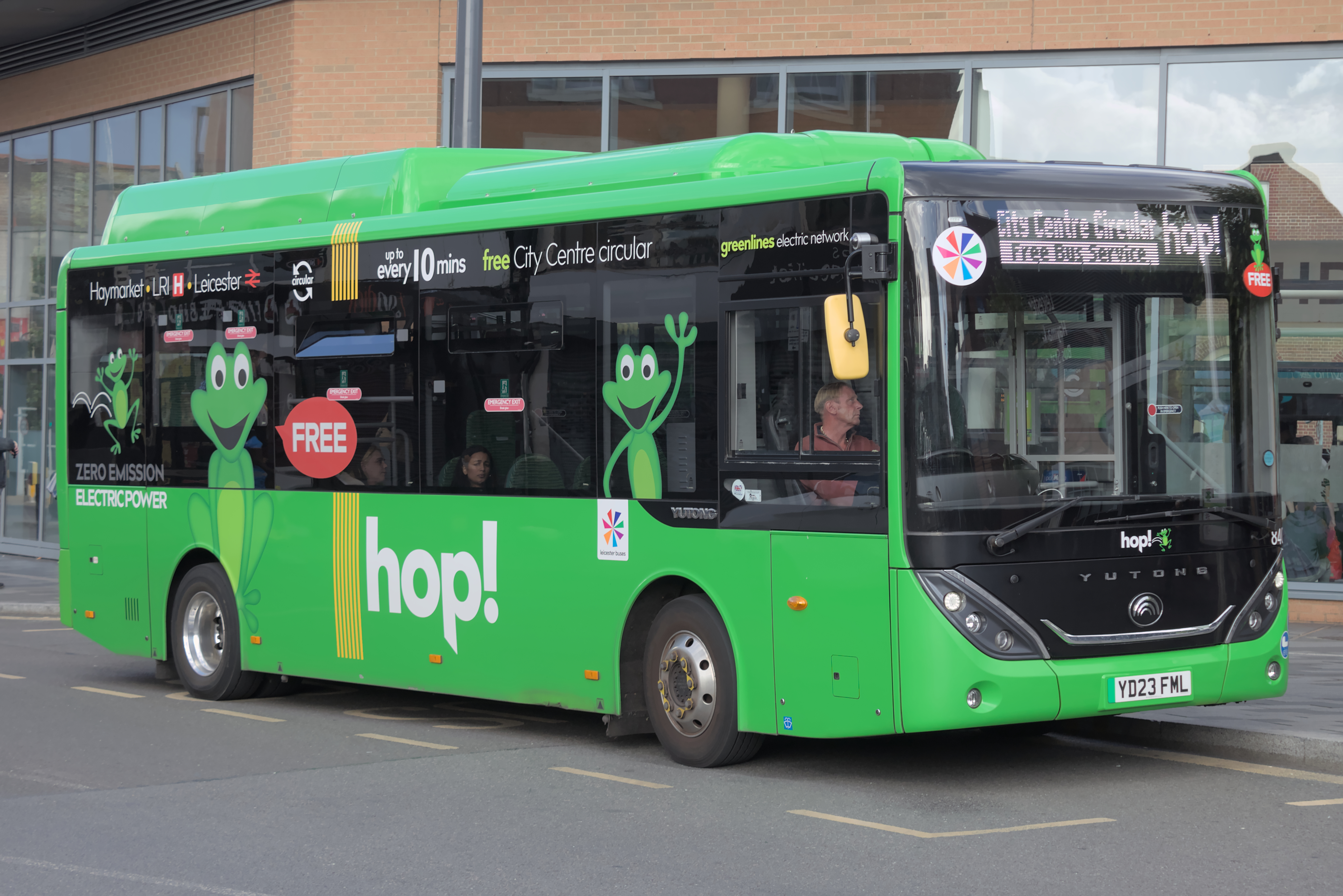
- Hop! branded Yutong E9 840 in September 2025

Overview
- Operator: Centrebus
- Vehicle: Yutong E9
- Peak vehicle requirement: 3

Route
- Start: Haymarket Bus Station
- Via: Savoy Street (Stand BC); St Peter's Lane; Causeway Lane; St Nicholas Circle; Southgates; Welford Road; Tower Street; Nelson Mandela Park; Leicester Railway Station; Granby Street; Charles Street
- End: Haymarket Bus Station

Service
- Frequency: up to every 10 mins (peak times & Saturday)/every 8 mins (Mon-Fri daytime off peak)
- Journey time: 20-24 mins
- Operates: 08:00-18:00

Hop! is a free anti-clockwise circular bus route operating around the City Centre in Leicester, England.

== History ==
The service was introduced on 3 April 2023. In its first 23 days of operation, 12,000 trips were taken on the service.

During May 2025, Leicester City Council announced that one million trips had been made on the Hop! service since its launch in April 2023 with an average of 2070 trips being made daily.

== Service ==
The service is free-of-charge and operates up to every 10 minutes Monday to Friday peak times and all day Saturday. As a result of high passenger numbers, the Monday to Friday off-peak service was increased to every 8 minutes from April 2024. It is operated by Centrebus using three Yutong E9 electric buses.

== Route ==
Hop! operates as an anti-clockwise circular service calling at the stops shown below:

Stops served in order:
Haymarket bus station
Savoy Street (Stand BC) (for St Margaret's Bus Station)
St Peter's Lane (Stand AA) (for Clock Tower)
Causeway Lane (Stand AD) (for Highcross Leicester)
St Nicholas Circle (Stand SB) (onward connections to Park & Ride services)
Southgates
Welford Road (for De Montfort University)
Tower Street (for Leicester Royal Infirmary)
Nelson Mandela Park (for Leicester Tigers and King Power Stadium)
Leicester railway station
Granby Street (for Leicester Market)
Charles Street (Stand CK) (for Curve Theatre)
Haymarket Bus Station
