= Eyres Monsell =

Electoral ward in Leicester, England

Coordinates: 52.590°N 1.147°W

- Population: 11,520 (2011)
- Unitary authority: Leicester
- Ceremonial county: Leicestershire
- Region: East Midlands
- Country: England
- Sovereign state: United Kingdom
- Post town: LEICESTER
- Postcode district: LE2
- Dialling code: 0116
- Police: Leicestershire
- Fire: Leicestershire
- Ambulance: East Midlands
- UK Parliament: Leicester South

Eyres Monsell is an electoral ward and administrative division in Leicester, England.

== Geography ==
Eyres Monsell is bounded to the north by the historic village of Aylestone. To the east is the village of South Wigston and to the south and west is the civil parish of Glen Parva. The ward is also adjacent to Blaby.

The area is defined by Saffron Road to the east, the Birmingham to Peterborough railway to the south, and Leicester Road to the west. Although located in the far south-west corner of Leicester, the area is under the administration of Leicester City Council rather than Leicestershire County Council as some of the neighbouring areas are.

Eyres Monsell is five miles south of Leicester city centre and is in walking distance from Fosse shopping park in Enderby. It is the southernmost ward of Leicester City.

== History ==
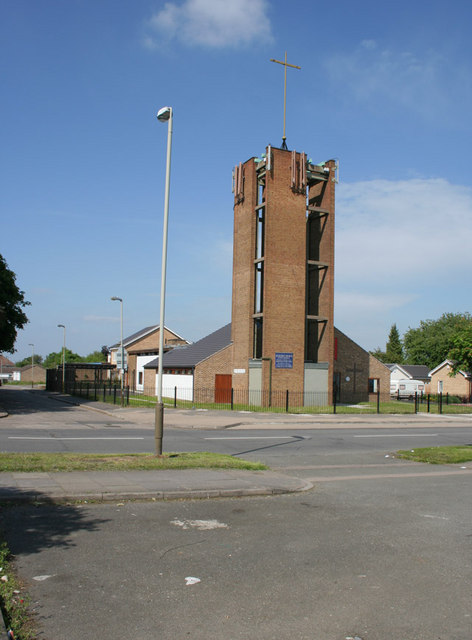
St Hugh's Church, Sturdee Road

The late 1940s saw an urgent need for new housing. The late 1940s and 1950s saw a large increase in housing being built across Leicester, including 2,500 new houses built between 1946 and 1959 in Eyres Monsell, which was being built south and adjacent to the earlier built Saffron Lane Estate. A mixture of brick and concrete houses were built, and tenants were given the option between a green or brown front door. Grey concrete walls were painted cream.

The land Eyres Monsell sits on was purchased in 1950, for the sum of £40,500, from councillor Bolton Eyres-Monsell (after whom the area is named) in a compulsory purchase order by Leicester City Council. Previously the land was largely rural which allowed the council to avoid building tower blocks, and instead focus on open-plan development and greener spaces. Eyres Monsell would become Leicester's second largest estate built after World War II.

== Demographics ==
Monmouth Drive in Eyres Monsell

In the 2011 census data, it was reported that Eyres Monsell had 11,520 usual residents, 52.6% of which were female, and with 4,826 houses in the area (11,230 usual residents in 2001 census). 2011 census data reported that 40.5% of homes are rented from the council. Under the 'right to buy' initiative, Eyres Monsell has proportionally more council houses being bought from the council by their occupants than other areas in the city.

It is noteworthy that, although it is a suburb of one of the most multiracial cities in the UK, the population of Eyres Monsell is 88.8% white British, according to 2011 Census data (a drop from 94.8% in 2001). 2001 census data also reported that the average age in Eyres Monsell was 37.2 years, which dropped slightly to 36.2 years in the 2011 census. Unemployment in Eyres Monsell was at 5.9% in 2001 (this rose to 7.6% in 2011 census data), and the area was reported in 2001 to be amongst the top 10% most deprived areas in the country. In 2011 census, it was reported that 40.6% of households have no adults in employment.

In a 2013 government report on health in Eyres Monsell, it was reported that health in the area is generally worse than the rest of England. An average of 1230 children live in poverty, and the area was reported to have a higher deprivation level than the Leicester average.

=== Education ===
Eyres Monsell was ranked amongst the top 10% worst in the country in regards to educational attainment in 2001. 2011 census data reported that 40.8% of residents over the age of 16 have no qualifications.

Eyres Monsell has one primary school, Eyres Monsell Primary School, which is located on Simmins Crescent. The school accepts an age range from 3 to 11, and was founded in 1950. In 2020, the school had a reported 360 pupils, while it has a maximum capacity of 420 pupils. In 2018, the school earned its first ever "good" rating from Ofsted, and became the first school in the UK to receive the Princess Royal Training Award for its work in improving the mental health of staff and pupils (which it won again in 2021). The school was forced to close temporarily during the COVID-19 pandemic due to an outbreak of cases in the school.

Eyres Monsell is also served by the Tudor Grange Samworth Academy, an all-through Church of England school with Academy status. The school serves ages 2–16, with a total capacity of 1046 students.

In 2021, Eyres Monsell Club for Young People, a volunteer-run youth club and charity, was awarded the Queen's Award for Voluntary Service. It is the highest award that a voluntary group can receive. The charity was founded in 1961 and provides informal education to youth in the area. During the COVID-19 pandemic, it was forced to close its youth centre and instead re-focused as a food bank for the local community.

=== Religion ===
2011 census data reported that 51.9% of residents in Eyres Monsell have a religion (of which 47.3% are Christian). In the 2021 census, 48.6% of residents reported they had no religion. The 2021 census reported a fall in the number of Christians, with only 36.5% of residents identifying as Christian. Islam is the second highest minority religion, with 5.7% of residents identifying as Muslim, followed by 1.4% of residents identifying as Hindu.

The Anglo-Catholic Parish Church of St Hugh is located on Sturdee Road, Eyres Monsell, and serves a parish of around 11,000 people. The church was proposed by Bishop Williams in February, 1955, and the vicarage was built by Frank Cooke between March and May 1956. The design was based on churches designed for Coventry. The complex opened in Autumn of 1958.

The area is also home to a Gypsy Church, and the St. John Bosco Roman Catholic Church on Pasley Road. In January 2024, the Eyres Monsell Community Church was opened on the estate. The church is affiliated with Affinity and is a recognised church plant by the Fellowship of Independent Evangelical Churches.

== Transport ==
Eyres Monsell is serviced by Arriva Midlands service 87, Centrebus Orbital 40S, and First Leicester services 88 and 88E.

Arriva Services 84, 85 and X45 serve the Leicester Road area which is in Glen Parva on the border to Eyres Monsell. Services 47, 48, and serve the Saffron Lane which links Aylestone with South Wigston.

== Sport ==
Eyres Monsell is home to FC Wygston First,Park FC and Monsell Club Wasps F.C, both association football clubs based around Sturdee Road. FC Wygston played in The Alliance Football League during the 2016-2017 and 2017-2018 leagues. Monsell Club Wasps F.C played in the Leicester Sunday Football League until late 2016 when, following a merger with the Charnwood League, the club played in the Leicester and Charnwood Sunday Football League.

== Politics ==
Eyres Monsell is part of the Leicester South parliamentary constituency, the winner of which represents the area in the House of Commons.

In local city council elections, the ward has been a Labour Party stronghold, who have held the area continually since 2007, after defeating the Liberal Democrats who formerly held the ward. In the 2007 election, Labour came first, Conservative Party second, BNP third (with 21% of the vote), and Liberal Democrats fourth.

Eyres Monsell By-Election 6 May 2010
Party	Candidate	Votes	%	±%
Labour	Virginia Cleaver	1,446	35.3	−2.5
Conservative	Jon Humberstone	999	24.4	+2.8
Liberal Democrats	Scott Kennedy-Lount	908	22.2	+5.8
BNP	Adrian Waudby	745	18.2	−3.2
Majority		447	10.9	
Turnout		4,098		
Labour hold		Swing	-2.65	

In 2015, Labour won with 43% of the vote. UKIP finished second with 26%, and the Conservative Party came third with 18% of the vote.
