= Haymarket station =

Haymarket station is the name of:

- Haymarket railway station in Edinburgh, Scotland
- Haymarket station (MBTA) in Boston, Massachusetts, USA
- Haymarket station (VRE), a former planned station in Haymarket, Virginia, USA
- Haymarket Metro station in Newcastle, England
- Haymarket bus station, Newcastle upon Tyne, England
- Haymarket bus station, Leicester, England
- Lincoln station (Nebraska), also known as Haymarket
- Haymarket station on the CBD and South East Light Rail in Sydney, NSW, Australia
