= Glen Parva Barracks =

- Glen Parva
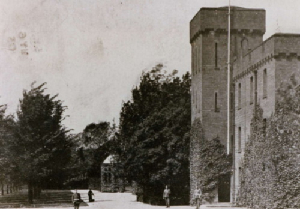
- Glen Parva Barracks

Site information
- Type: Barracks
- Operator: British Army

Location
- Location within Leicestershire
- Coordinates: 52°34′59″N 01°08′42″W

Site history
- Built: 1881
- Built for: War Office
- In use: 1881-1970

Glen Parva Barracks was a military installation at Glen Parva near South Wigston in Leicestershire.

== History ==
The barracks opened under the name of Wigston Barracks in 1881. Their creation took place as part of the Cardwell Reforms which encouraged the localisation of British military forces. The barracks became the depot for the two battalions of the 17th (Leicestershire) Regiment of Foot as well as the 45th (Nottinghamshire) Regiment of Foot. Following the Childers Reforms, the barracks became the depot of the Royal Leicestershire Regiment in 1881.

Tens of thousands of recruits and conscripts were trained there for deployment during the First World War. The barracks went on to become the regional centre for infantry training as the Forester Brigade Depot in 1960. They were closed in the late 1960s and most of the buildings were sold. Although Glen Parva Young Offenders Institution was built on much of the site a unit of the Royal Army Pay Corps remained there until 1997. The YOI was later demolished and a new prison, HMP Fosse Way, was opened on the site in 2023.

== Sources ==
- Beazley, Ben (2006). Postwar Leicester. History Press. ISBN 978-0750940689.
