= Beaumont Shopping Centre =

Located in Beaumont Leys, on the edge of Leicester

Coordinates: 52.6663°N 1.1665°W

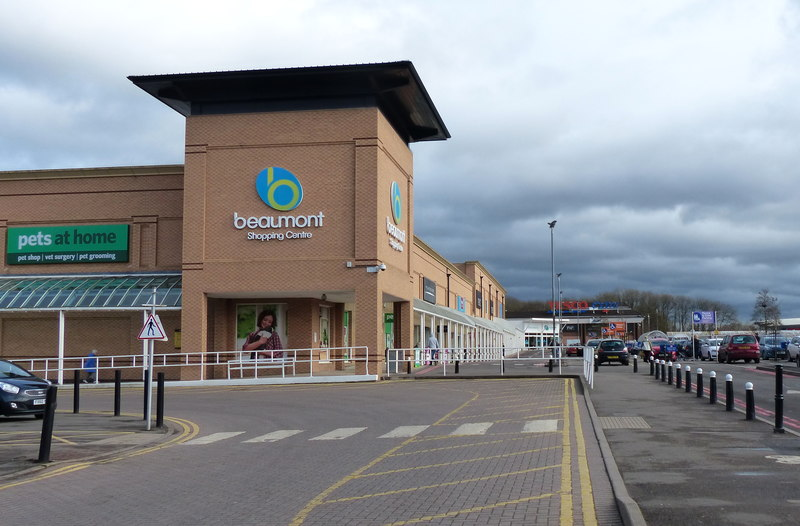
- Location: Beaumont Leys
- Address: 25 Beaumont Way, Leicester, Leicestershire, LE4 1DS.
- Opened: 1980s; 45 years ago
- Manager: GVA on behalf of British Land
- Owner: British Land
- Num. of stores: 40+
- Num. of anchor tenants: Tesco
- Floors: 1
- Parking: 3 parking zones
- Website: https://www.beaumontshoppingcentre.com

Beaumont Shopping Centre is in Beaumont Leys, on the edge of Leicester. The 301,099 sq ft (27,973.0 m^{2}) shopping centre is owned by British Land and operated by GVA.

== History ==
The Fletcher Mall portion of the property was sold to Cervidae in April 2021.

== Facilities ==
There are three car parks located within the main shopping area allowing upto 4 hours free parking, toilet facilities are located within the Tesco store, previously public toilets were located within the outdoor market area.

== Stores ==
Retailers currently occupying units with the centre are Boots, Iceland, Peacocks, Shoe Zone, Savers Health and Beauty, Aldi, Greggs, Costa Coffee, Specsavers, Pets at Home, Cex, O2, Age UK Charity Shop and Sally Health&Beauty

Tesco Extra are the anchor tenant of the shopping centre located on the Bradgate Mall and features Tesco Phone Shop and Tesco Opticians.

=== Beaumont Market ===
The centre had an outdoor market area which opened in 1984. The market was open from Wednesday to Sunday. The main area was under cover and had over 60 stalls with a wide range of products on sale such as fruit and vegetables, games and DVDs, household items and general bric-a-brac stall. There was also usually a butchers van. The market was closed and demolished in 2025. The area has since been used to host “Beaumont Beach”, a kids play area with a large sand pit, trampolines and other temporary play structures.

A car boot sale for used goods was held in the car park located next to the market area on Sundays between March and November although it was ceased as a result of the COVID-19 pandemic.

=== Other ===
Both Matalan and Buzz Bingo are located across the road but neither is officially part of Beaumont Shopping Centre.

== Public transport ==
Beaumont Shopping Centre has a purpose-built bus terminus that has seven stands which run services into and around the outskirts of Leicester, services 14A, 25/26, 54 and 74 are operated by First Leicester, Centrebus provide services HH "Hospital Hopper", LeicesterOrbital 40N/40S and route 154.

=== Potential expansion ===
Leicester City Council are planning to open a Park and Ride hub on land north of the shopping centre. However the development of this is uncertain as the original plans proposed in 2021 for the Park and Ride hub included a bus lane corridor connecting the bus terminus and the neighbouring village of Anstey which has as of May 2026 failed to come to fruition.
