= First Leicester =

Bus operator in Leicester, England

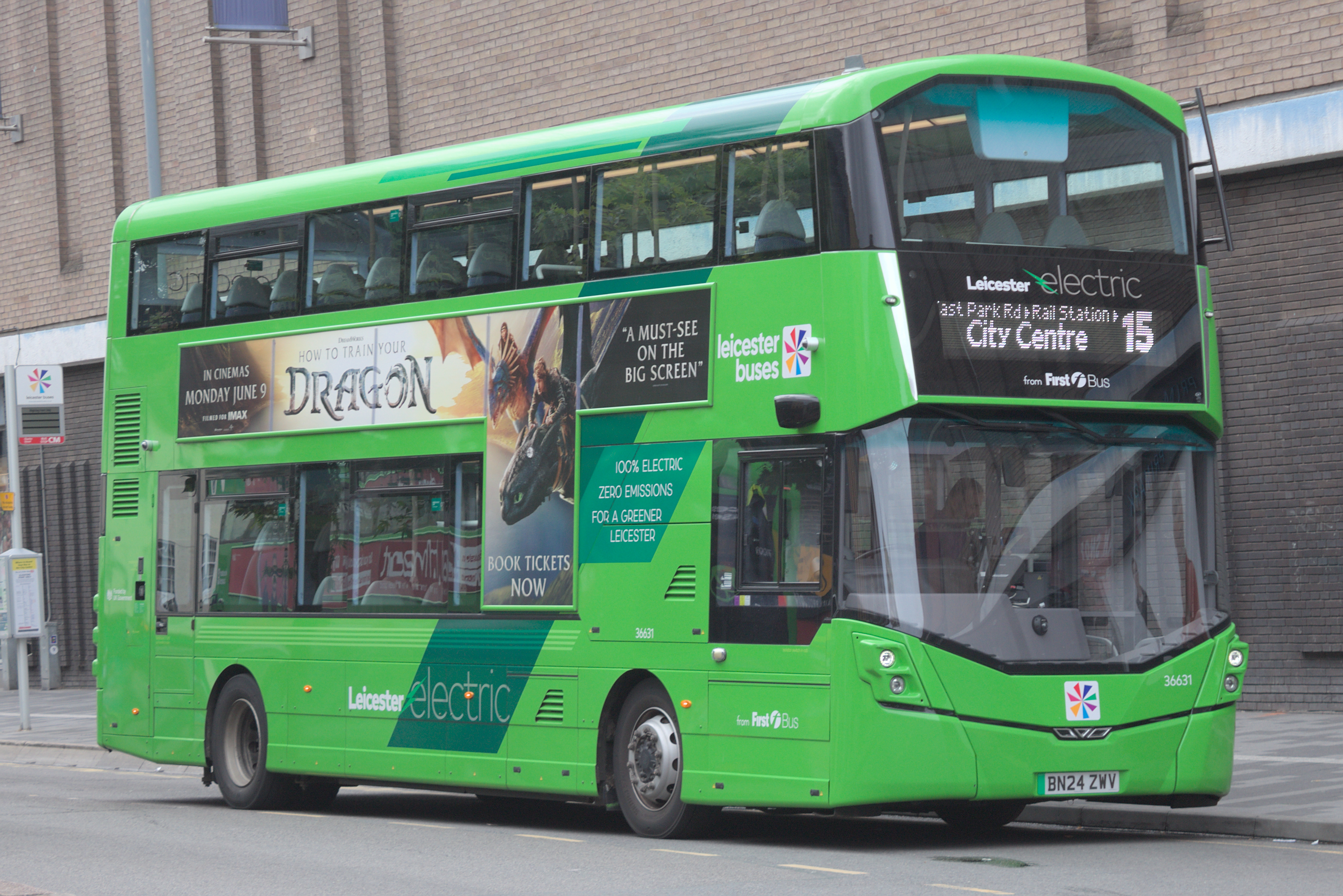
- Wright StreetDeck Electroliner battery electric bus on Charles Street in June 2025
- Parent: FirstGroup
- Headquarters: Abbey Lane, Leicester
- Service area: Leicester
- Service type: Bus services
- Depots: 1
- Fleet: 100 (April 2025)
- Fuel type: battery electric
- Website: Official website

Leicester Citybus Limited, trading as First Leicester, is a bus operator providing services in Leicester. FirstGroup owns 100% of the company after purchasing Trentbarton's 6% shareholding in 2023.

== History ==
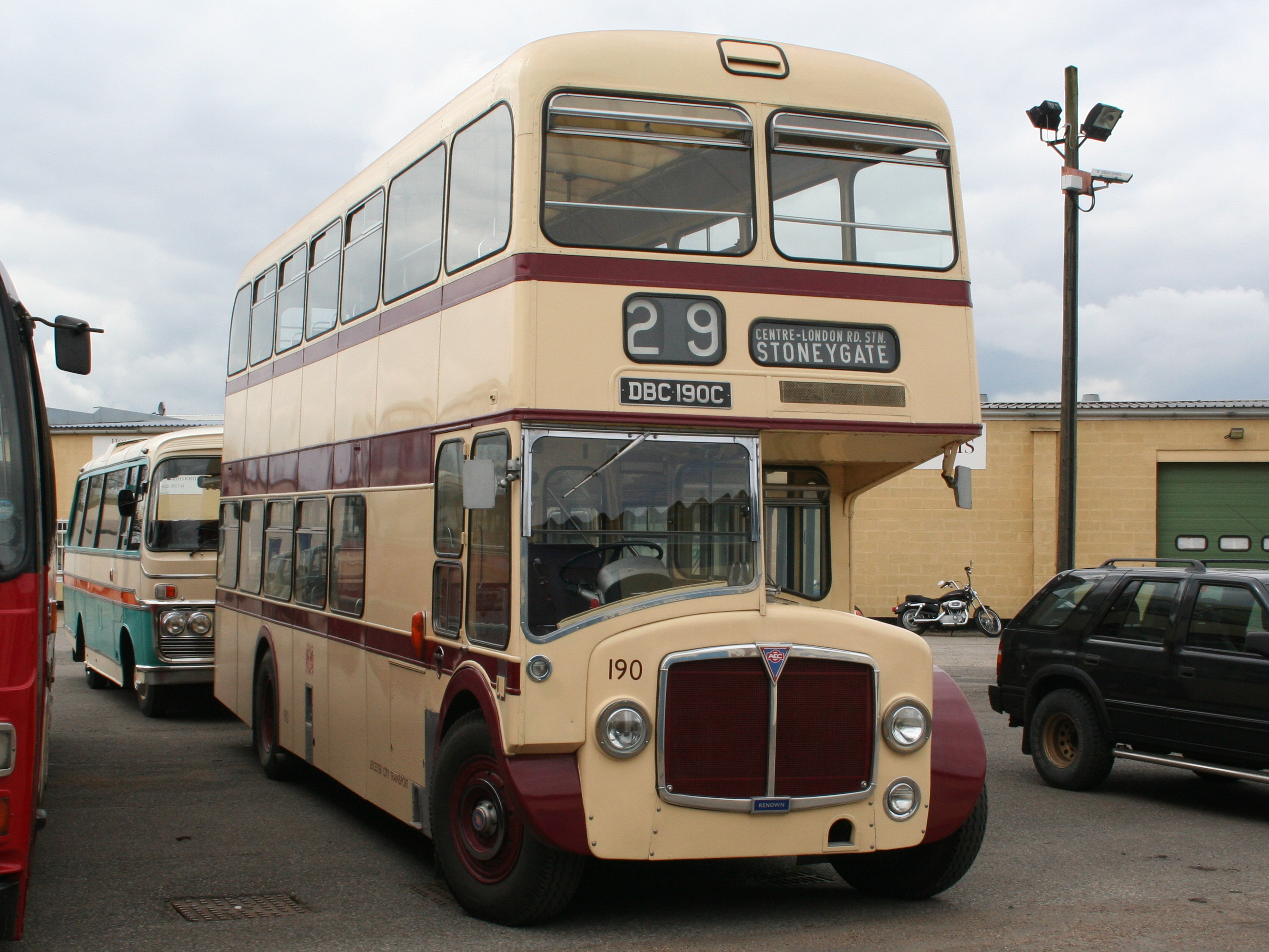
Preserved 1964 Leicester City Transport AEC Renown

In December 1874 the Leicester Tramways Company commenced operating. In July 1901 it was taken over by Leicester Corporation Transport with 39 tramcars and 30 horse-drawn buses and began to be electrified. In July 1924 the first motor buses entered service gradually replacing the trams with the last running in November 1949.

In 1972 Leicester Corporation Transit began operating services in partnership with Midland Red to South Wigston and Wigston Magna and in 1976 to Oadby. In August 1979 the business of Gibson Brothers, Barlestone was purchased which included two services from Market Bosworth to Leicester, one via Barlestone the other via Peckleton.

In 1983 Leicester Corporation Transport was rebranded as Leicester CityBus. To comply with the Transport Act 1985, in 1986 the assets of Leicester CityBus were transferred to a separate legal entity of the same name.

Leicester City Council put its 94% shareholding in Leicester CityBus up for sale in March 1993, which was purchased by the GRT Group the following November. After GRT Group merged with Badgerline to form FirstBus in April 1995, the operation was rebranded as First Leicester.

== Fleet ==
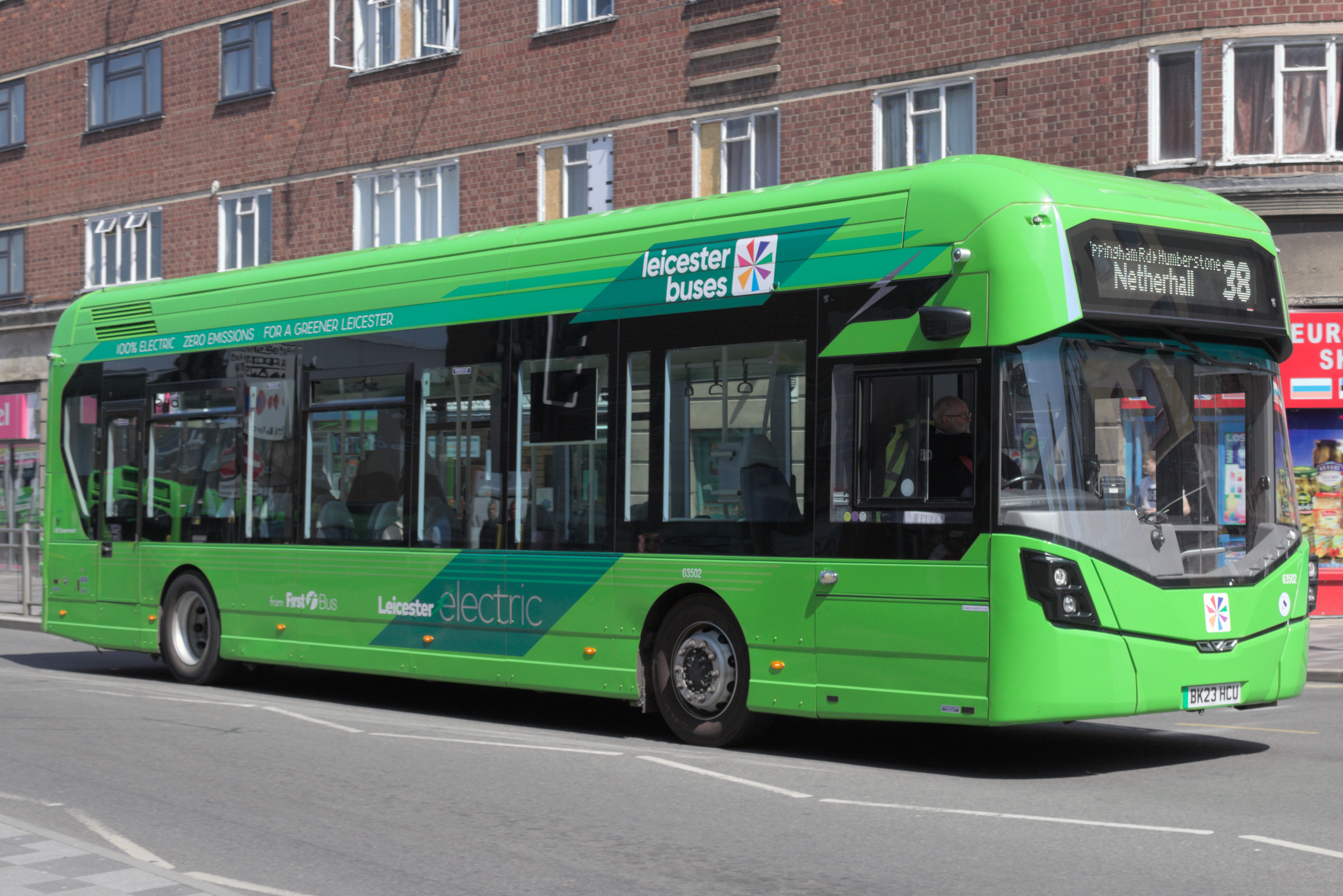
Wright GB Kite Electroliner on Charles Street in April 2025

As of April 2025, the First Leicester fleet consists of approximately 100 buses, 68 of which are Wright GB Kite Electroliner battery electric single-deck buses that began entering service in May 2023; an additional 18 Streetdeck Electroliners were delivered during spring 2024. Between 2024 and 2025, 6 Wright StreetDecks new to FirstGroup between late 2015 and early 2016 entered service following conversion from diesel to battery electric by NewPower.

First Leicester's driver training fleet consists of 2 2009 Volvo B7RLEs in a yellow livery.

First Leicester also operates 5 MCV Evoras new to them in 2024 on the East Midlands Airport shuttle services.

=== Liveries ===
Leicester City Transport buses were painted in crimson relieved by cream, this was reversed in the 1960s. When rebranded Leicester CityBus, a red, white and grey livery was introduced.

Upon the takeover in November 1993 by GRT Group, the fleet began to wear a version of the GRT corporate livery, with the base and relief colours associated with Leicester City municipal buses, but in the corporate GRT arrangement, with Leicester CityBus fleetnames and a spire motif. This was replaced by FirstGroup corporate livery.

During 2015/2016, First Midlands, the parent group of First Leicester, introduced a fuchsia fronted version of the latest corporate livery across their fleet.

During 2019, service 18 received four newer buses in a purple livery branded as 'theBraunstoneBus', with services 88/88A/88E branded as 'Saffron' referring to Saffron Lane which they serve in a yellow and crimson livery. Services 14 and 14a would later receive buses featuring orange FrequentFourteens branding.

In 2023, a new bright green livery branded for the Leicester Buses partnership was introduced on the brand new battery electric buses.

== Services ==
Most First Leicester bus services are operated from either Haymarket Bus Station or St Margaret's Bus Station.

Services operate from the City Centre to Glenfield, New Parks, Braunstone Frith & Kirby Frith, Glenfield Hospital, Braunstone, Fosse Park, Eyres Monsell, Saffron Lane, Leicester Royal Infirmary, Leicester General Hospital, Goodwood, Netherhall, Thurnby Lodge, Thurmaston, Rushey Mead, Mowmacre Hill, Beaumont Centre, Beaumont Leys, Anstey and Highfields.

=== Other Services ===
First Leicester also provides shuttle buses around East Midlands Airport.

=== Aircoach ===
First Group subsidiary Aircoach launched an hourly service between Leicester and Birmingham Airport using the First Leicester depot as a base for a fleet of 4 Mercedes-Benz Sprinter minibuses. During August 2024 it was announced that the Aircoach operations would be wound down with no new bookings being taken after Saturday 31 August and all remaining operations ceasing by 31 October 2024.

== Depot ==
In 2007 a new depot was opened on Abbey Lane which is also the headquarters of First Midlands, replacing the former depot on Abbey Park Road which was once home to Leicester's tram network, where a fire in August 1999 destroyed three vehicles and parts of the former tram sheds.

== See also ==
- List of bus operators of the United Kingdom
