= HM Prison Glen Parva =

Former prison in Leicester, England

Coordinates: 52.5832°N 1.1451°W

HMP Glen Parva
- Interactive map of HMP Glen Parva
- Location: Glen Parva, Leicestershire
- Status: Closed
- Security class: Juveniles/Young Offenders
- Opened: 1974
- Closed: June 2017
- Managed by: HM Prison Services
- Governor: Alison Clarke

HM Prison Glen Parva was an adult male prison and Young Offenders Institution, located in Glen Parva, Leicestershire, England. Glen Parva was operated by His Majesty's Prison Service from 1974 to 2017; from July 2011 onwards, it was an adult and young offenders institution.

The prison closed in June 2017, following an announcement at the end of 2016 that it would be replaced with a newly built category C adult prison. It has since been demolished and a new prison, HMP Fosse Way, was opened on the site in 2023.

== History ==
Glen Parva was constructed on the site of the former Glen Parva Barracks in the early 1970s as a borstal and has always held young offenders. Since its opening in 1974 the establishment has seen considerable expansion and change and now serves a catchment area of over 100 courts, holding a mixture of sentenced, unsentenced, and remand prisoners.

In 1997, His Majesty's Chief Inspector of Prisons walked out of an inspection at Glen Parva because conditions were so bad. After a subsequent inspection a year later, the report stated that there was "hope for the future" for the prison but added that a lot of work still needed to be done, and recommended that some staff should be moved because of their attitude towards inmates.

In July 2002, four inmates from Glen Parva escaped whilst on a two-day camping trip in the Peak District. Two were caught soon after, but two inmates managed to evade police capture for some time.

In its annual report in 2003, the Board of Visitors revealed two serious cases of unrest at Glen Parva Prison. On one occasion, 16 inmates barricaded themselves inside a building. The report blamed an unprecedented rise in the number of inmates at the prison, and also the fact that some inmates were bored and unsettled, finding themselves hundreds of miles from home.

In November 2004, the Prison Reform Trust condemned Glen Parva for the high amount of time inmates spent in their cells and for the lack of time spent in "useful activity" at the prison. Statistics for 2003–2004 showed that on average inmates spent just 17.3 hours a week in useful activity, and an average of just another seven hours a week out of their cells.

In February 2010 the prison's Independent Monitoring Board (IMB) described conditions there as "deplorable". Their report said "water from the prison's poorly-maintained toilet plumbing system leaked out of the pipes and seeped through the walls," causing "a horrible smell that fills the corridors and cells on regular occasions" and that the prison "operates within the confines of a sprawling campus of largely shabby buildings which continue to degrade over time, despite the best efforts of the management and staff." The board also warned that the policy of transferring prisoners into Glen Parva from other regions "has recently introduced an increasing level of gang rivalry, thereby adding yet another dimension to an already toxic melting pot".

In August 2016, ambulance personnel called to prison criticised staff for their lack of urgency when faced with a life-threatening medical emergency.

== The prison ==
Glen Parva Prison was a closed Young Offenders Institution and Remand Centre. At the time of its closure accommodation was divided into ten residential units each having a mixture of single and double cells. All cells had integral sanitation and most had televisions which could be rented by prisoners.

The Healthcare Centre at Glen Parva had 14 inpatient beds with 24-hour nursing cover. Many health services at the prison were provided by Leicestershire Primary Care Trust.

Education and training provision at Glen Parva was delivered through six skills academies. Courses and programmes on offer included Information Technology, Computer Aided Design, Business Studies, Home Economics, Catering, ESOL, Art, Engineering, Carpentry, Barbering, Bricklaying, Painting and Decorating, Forklift Truck Driving, Horticulture, Gardening, Physical Education, Plastics, Laundry, Recycling and Industrial Cleaning. The prison also had links with organisations such as The Prince's Trust, Age Concern and National Grid plc to provide employment for Young Offenders on release.

It was announced towards the end of 2016 that HMP Glen Parva would close and be replaced with a newly built category C adult prison. It has since been completely demolished and redeveloped, with HMP Fosse Way opening in 2023 on the site.
