= Thorpe Astley =

Area of Leicester, England

Coordinates: 52.617543°N 1.196453°W

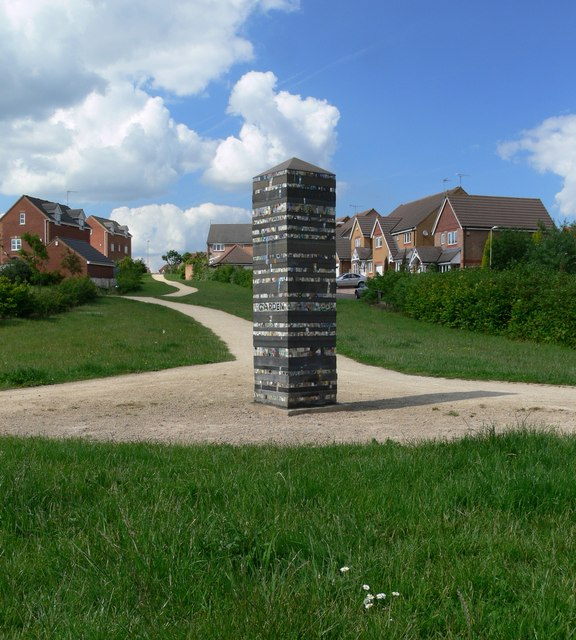

- Location within Leicestershire
- OS grid reference: SK5402
- District: Blaby
- Shire county: Leicestershire
- Region: East Midlands
- Country: England
- Sovereign state: United Kingdom
- Post town: Leicester
- Postcode district: LE3
- Dialling code: 0116
- Police: Leicestershire
- Fire: Leicestershire
- Ambulance: East Midlands
- UK Parliament: Mid Leicestershire

Thorpe Astley is a suburban settlement on the southwestern edge of the city of Leicester, England. It is part of the civil parish of Braunstone Town, although a small part of the development, around Goodheart Way, extends into Leicester Forest East civil parish. Both Braunstone Town and Leicester Forest East are within the district of Blaby, Leicestershire.

This settlement was built on the last area of agricultural land in Braunstone Town. Construction of this development began after approval from the Blaby District Council in 1994. It covers most of a wedge of land between the M1 Motorway on its western side and the A563 ringroad on the east, with the established community of Braunstone West is on its north side. It is neighboured to the south by the Meridian industrial and commercial development.

A Community Centre to serve this housing estate was opened in October 2010; this is maintained by Braunstone Town Council. Around the same time a new community group was formed, Your Thorpe Astley, with the aim of furthering the interests of local residents and staging events at the centre.

The name "Thorpe Astley" was derived from the Astley family, who owned land in Braunstone Town from 1334 to 1404.

Several roads in the Thorpe Astley estate are named after famous people from history, including the 18th-century political radical Thomas Paine and American paratroop commander General James M. Gavin. The headquarters of General Gavin's U.S. 82nd Airborne Division was stationed at Braunstone Park during 1944.

== Transport ==
Thorpe Astley is served by Centrebus LC17 and Leicester Orbital 40S which operates around outer Leicester.

Central Connect run the NovusDirect from the estate of New Lubbesthorpe through Thorpe Astley, into Leicester City Centre stopping at Leicester railway station providing onward rail connections to Birmingham New Street, London St Pancras, Notttingham, Sheffield and Cambridge

Thorpe Astley is around five minutes away from the M69 and M1 Junction 21.

== Culture ==
=== Leisure and entertainment ===
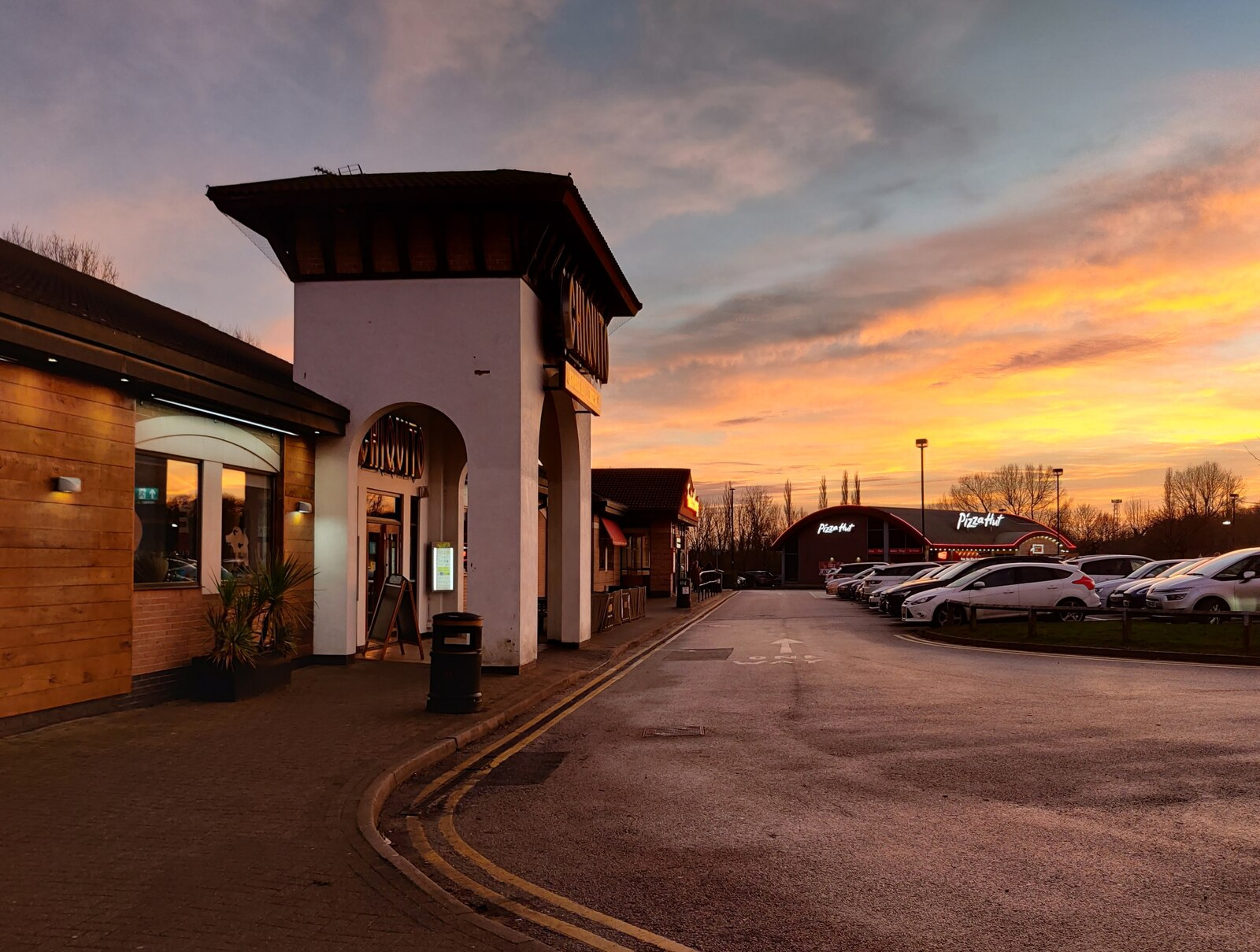
Frankie & Benny's, next to Pizza Hut, in December 2024

Meridian Leisure Park is located about 5 minutes away from Thorpe Astley, containing a bowling alley ran by Hollywood Bowl, a Vue cinema, a children's play area, a David Lloyd fitness business and several restaurants.

The first Frankie & Benny's opened here in October 1995, by City Centre Restaurants. Sutton Coldfield followed soon after. There were 36 by 1999.

Meridian Business Park is located about 5 minutes away, containing multiple businesses, various pubs and hotels, a McDonalds, and a Costa Coffee, as well as a local fire station.

Fosse Park is a 5-minute drive away and accessible by bus.

== See also ==
- Braunstone Town
