= Alex Belfield =

Former radio presenter

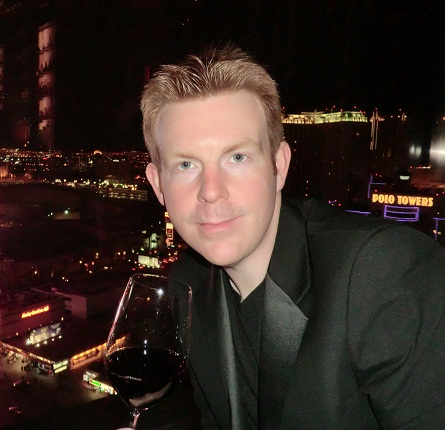
- Belfield in 2013
- Born: 14 January 1980 (age 46); Nottingham, England
- Occupations: Radio presenter; journalist; entertainer
- Employer: BBC (former)
- Known for: BBC Radio Leeds; The Voice of Reason
- Criminal charges: Stalking
- Criminal penalty: 5 years and 26 weeks
- Criminal status: Imprisoned

Alex Belfield (born 14 January 1980) is an English former radio presenter for BBC Radio Leeds who was dismissed for misconduct. He was convicted of stalking charges in September 2022 and imprisoned.

== Career ==
Belfield worked at Mansfield 103.2 FM in the early 2000s. He presented the mid-morning show on BBC Radio Leeds. In 2010 he made lewd comments on air about weather presenter Keeley Donovan that resulted in complaints from listeners. Belfield was suspended from the station for a day and strongly reprimanded by BBC bosses.

From 2007, Belfield released videos through his YouTube channel, initially called Celebrity Radio before rebranding as The Voice of Reason. His videos often promoted far-right and transphobic views.

== Stalking conviction ==
On 18 June 2021 Belfield was summoned to appear at Nottingham Magistrates' Court on 1 July, where he was charged with 12 counts of stalking "involving fear of violence or serious alarm or distress". On 29 July 2021, Belfield appeared at Nottingham Crown Court on twelve charges of stalking eight people between November 2012 and March 2021, including BBC staff members Stephanie Hirst and Jeremy Vine.

Belfield was convicted in September 2022 at Nottingham Crown Court of four stalking offences. He was sentenced to five and a half years in prison. While having not submitted himself to cross-examination, he was permitted a closing speech in which he called the case a 'BBC and police witch-hunt' and described himself as 'the No 1 anti-BBC journalist'". He told the jury "I am offensive... My human right allows me to speak words that are not to everyone's taste". Addressing Belfield, the judge said that while acknowledging the distress you caused, you "appear to focus on the impact on you and feel...you've been treated unfairly". Leave to appeal was refused in February 2023.

In May 2024, the Nottinghamshire police detective who had led the stalking investigation into Belfield won a libel case against him. Belfield had falsely accused the detective of being corrupt, lying in court and colluding with the BBC in a witch hunt against him. Belfield retracted all his comments, issued a "sincere and unqualified apology" and will pay substantial damages along with compensation for legal costs to the detective. In March 2025, the BBC issued a "full and unreserved apology" to staff members who had been stalked by Belfield.

Belfield was released from HMP Fosse Way in June 2025, after 2 years and 9 months. He was recalled to prison in February 2026 for breaching his licence in a manner described as "an accumulation of professional concerns over an extended period relating to Mr Belfield’s use of a computer, the internet and email".
