= Haymarket bus station, Leicester =

Bus station in England

Haymarket Bus Station
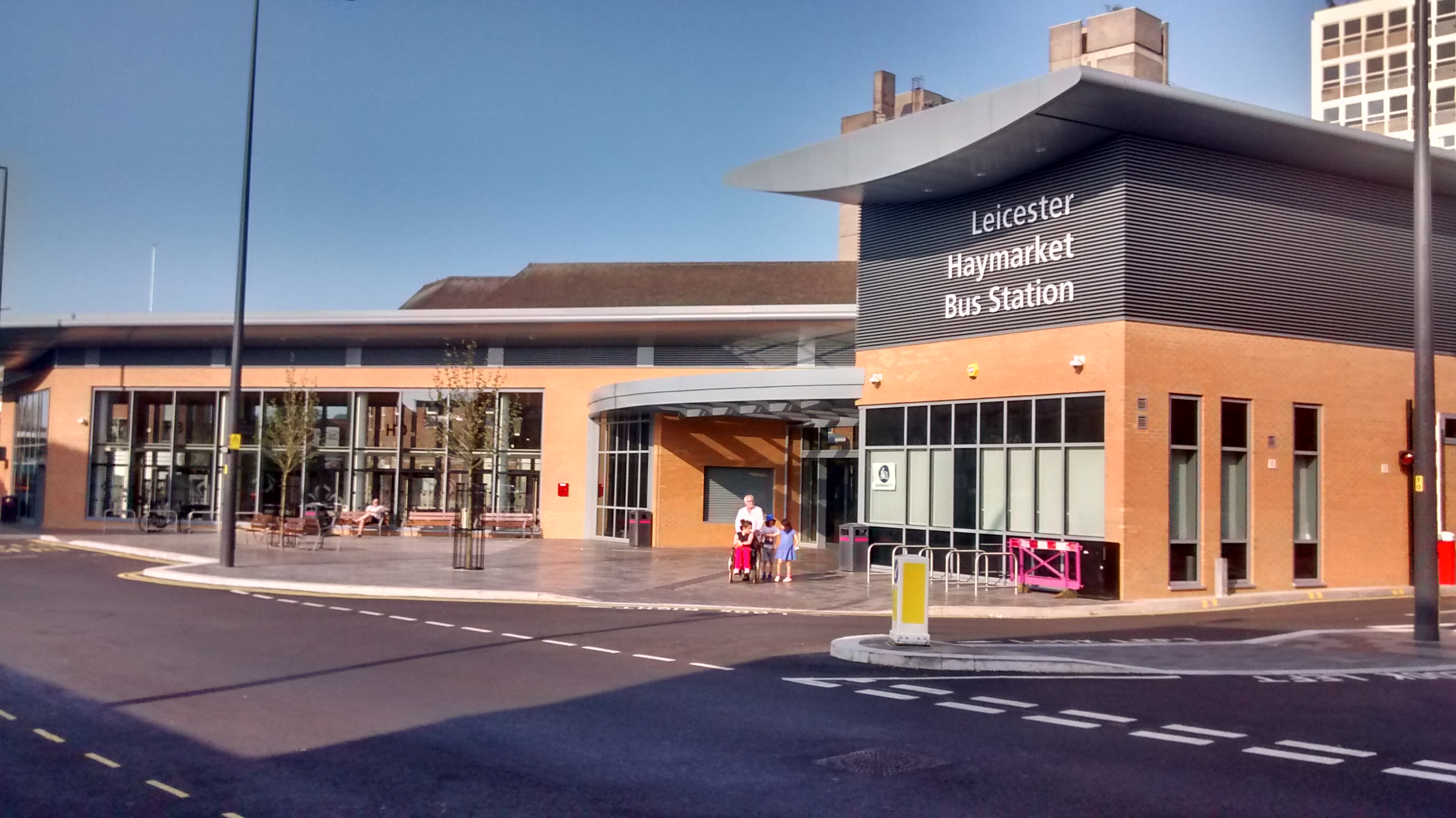
- The main entrance of the bus station

General information
- Location: 1 Charles Street; Leicester; United Kingdom
- Owner: Leicester City Council
- Operator: Leicester City Council
- Bus routes: 41
- Bus stands: 23
- Bus operators: Arriva Midlands; Central Connect; Centrebus; First Leicester; Stagecoach

Other information
- Website: www.leicesterbuses.co.uk

History
- Opened: 1994 (original) 2016 (redeveloped station)
- Closed: 2015 (original)
Location

Haymarket bus station is the main bus station serving the city of Leicester. Originally built in 1994, it lies next to and operates as a transport hub for Haymarket Shopping Centre.

== History ==
The bus station was developed at a proposed cost of £2m in mid-1994, coinciding with a major refurbishment of the adjacent Haymarket Shopping Centre complex. From January 2015 the bus station was closed for redevelopment to double the size, the new bus station opened during May 2016.

== Services ==
Haymarket bus station is open seven days a week and is used for mostly local services operated by Arriva Midlands, Central Connect, Centrebus and First Leicester alongside Stagecoach Midlands service X7 to Northampton.

The anticlockwise circular Hop! service calls at a stop outside on Belgrave Gate.

== Facilities ==
The main Leicester Shopmobility offices are located at the station at the Belgrave Gate entrance. A smaller office is located within Highcross Leicester.

The bus station also has public toilets which have been recently refurbished alongside changing places accessible facilities.

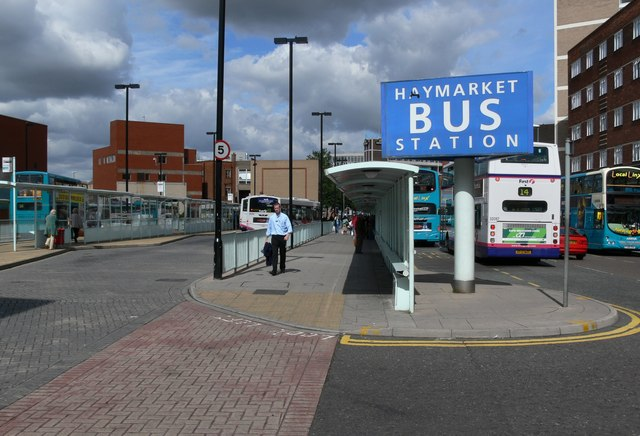
The previous station in 2007

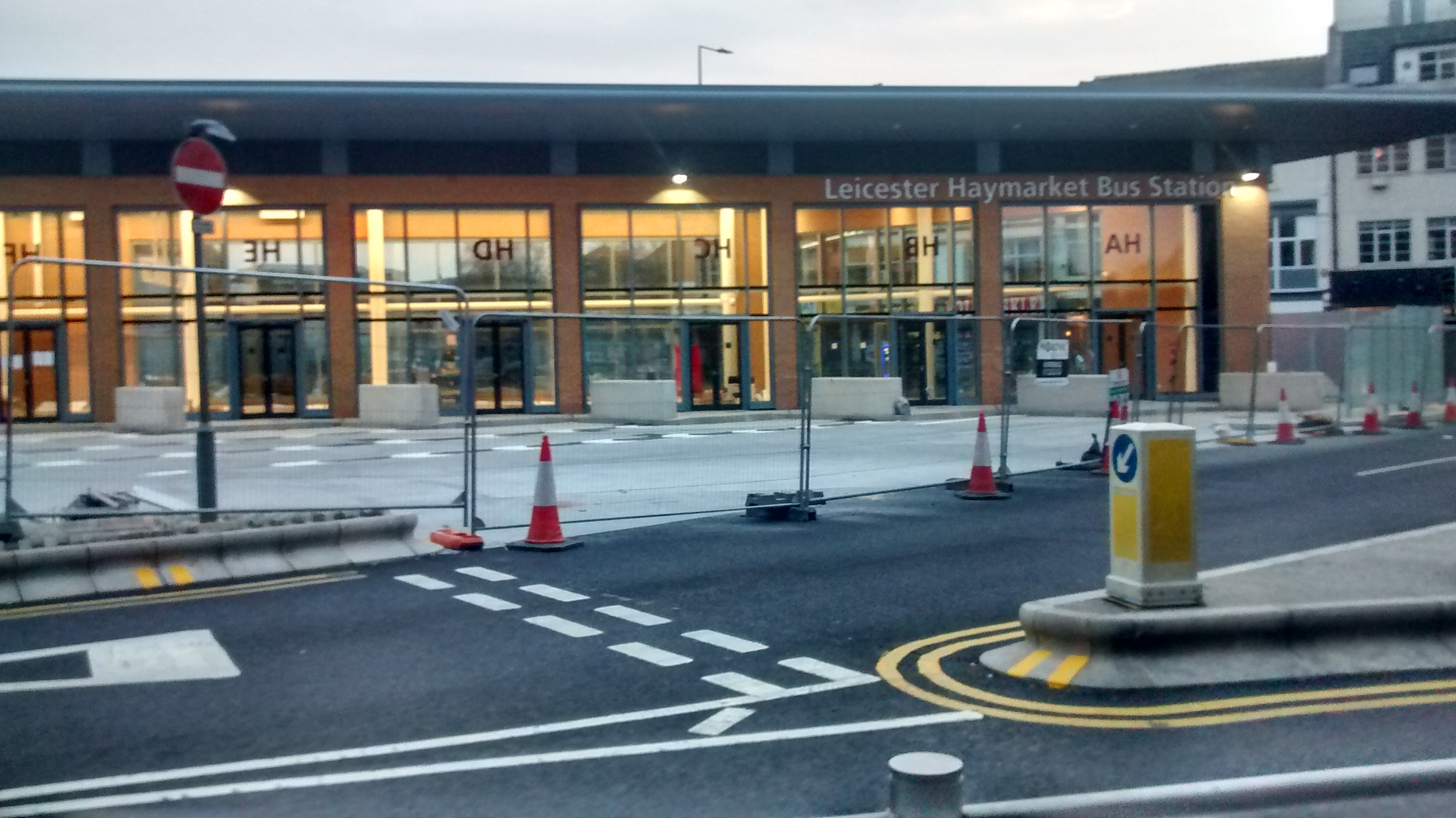
The station before reopening in 2016

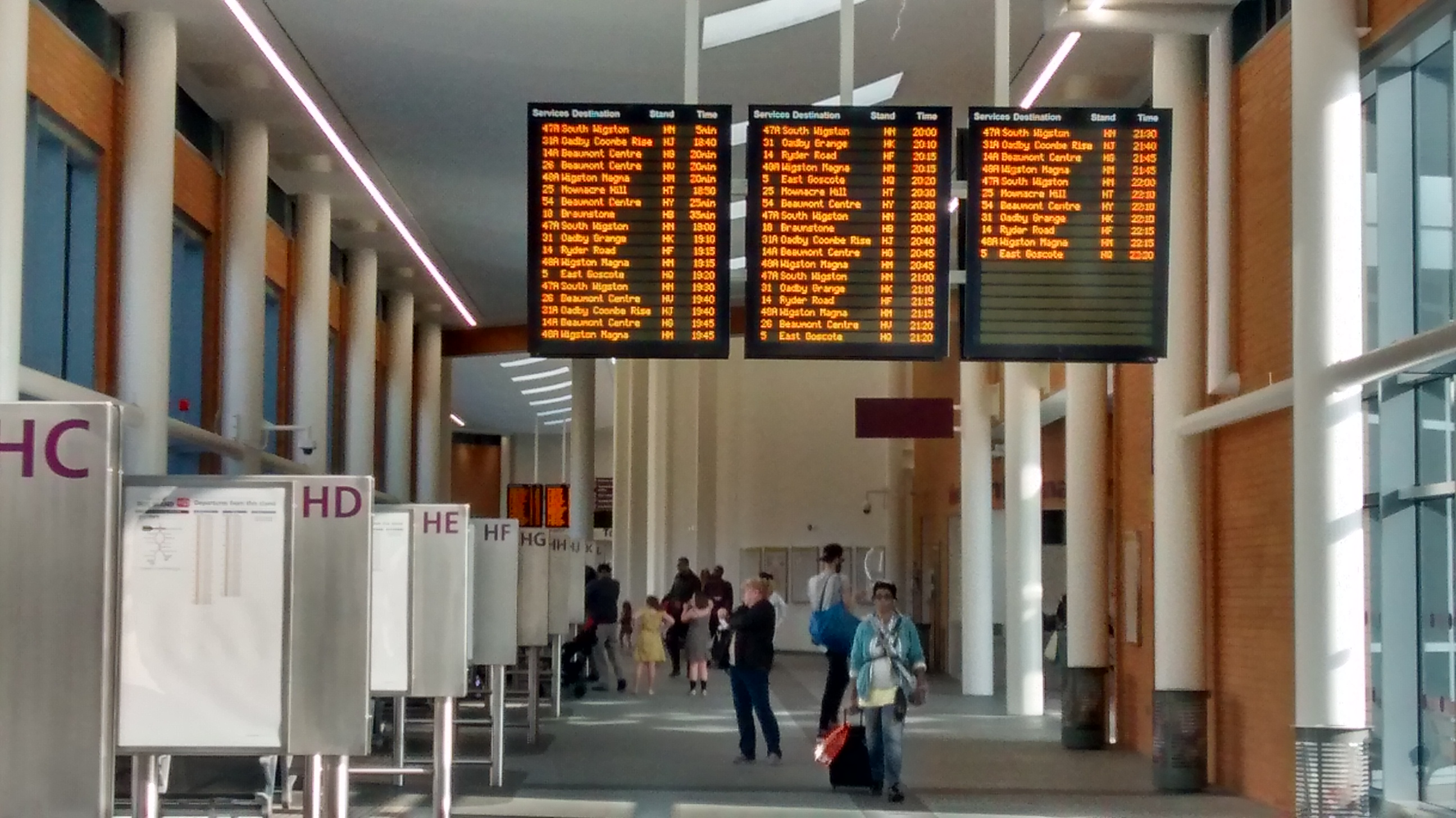
Interior of the station after reopening in May 2016

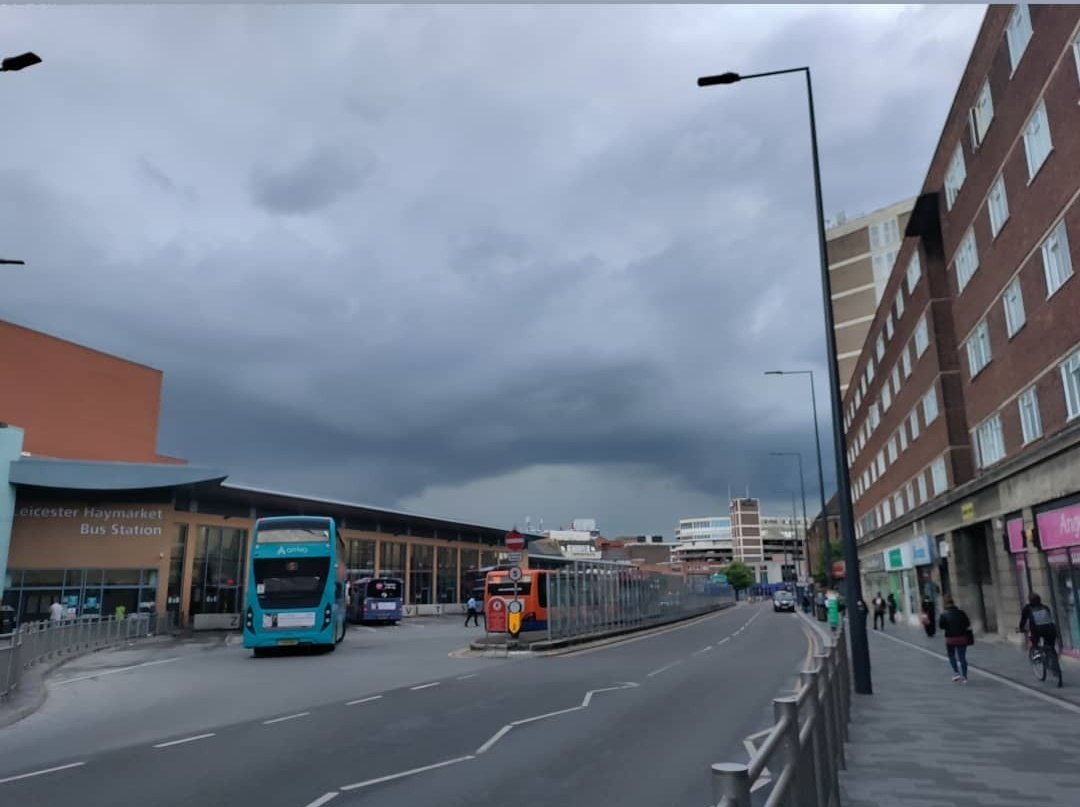
The Charles Street entrance in 2021
