= Thurnby Lodge =

Housing estate in Leicester, England

Coordinates: 52.638°N 1.060°W

Thurnby Lodge is an estate in eastern Leicester, Leicestershire, England. Roughly, it consists of the area inside the city boundary which is north of the Uppingham Road, east of the A563 outer ringroad, and south of the Scraptoft Lane.

It is near, however not part of Thurnby (to the south-east), after which it is named. Other nearby places are Humberstone (north and west), Scraptoft (east), Evington (south) and Goodwood (south).

== History ==
Thurnby Lodge is a council estate built from the early 1950s onwards to facilitate the central Leicester slum clearance until the 1960s. The area west of Bowhill Grove was the last phase of the estate stretching to Nursery Road at its most westerly point. Two, three and four-bedroomed council houses were built in brick and concrete block, terraced with large rear and smaller front gardens.

Many of the houses on the estate have transferred to private ownership under the right to buy, resulting in a large variety of upgrades and extensions to the original council properties.

== Education ==
Children on the estate usually attend Thurnby Mead Academy or Willowbrook Mead Academy (whose sister and architecturally identical school Scraptoft Valley was on the adjoining Netherhall estate). The popular public house the Stirrup Cup on Thurncourt Road is one of the few estate pubs left. At its northerly point, the White House Inn on Scraptoft Lane is the largest public house.

== Transport ==
The estate was serviced by Midland Red buses, routes L37 and L38 whose terminus were on Thurncourt Road opposite the shops.

Buses that currently serve the area are: Arriva Midlands services 37 and 56/56A Centrebus 40 CircleLine, First Leicester services 38 and 38A.

== Environment ==
The area south of the main shops on Thurncourt Road, towards the parallel railway embankment, was originally mainly unlandscaped country land with a natural stream running through it. The stream divides at a point opposite Thurncourt Road shops into two further tributaries, one which continues on towards the city and the other taking a route southwards under tunnels beneath the railway embankment. This natural area was extensively landscaped in several phases by the Leicester City Council and a floodplain added up until the present day, destroying a natural fertile habitat for the then common water voles and small fresh water fish found within the habitat.
