= HM Prison Fosse Way =

Men's prison in Glen Parva, Leicestershire, England

HMP Fosse Way
- Ariel view of HM Prison Fosse Way.
- Interactive map of HMP Fosse Way
- Location: Glen Parva, Leicestershire, England LE18 4WS; 52.5832°N 1.1451°W
- Security class: Adult Male/Category C
- Capacity: 1,715
- Population: 1,705 (June 2025)
- Opened: 2023; 3 years ago
- Managed by: Serco
- Director: Wyn Jones
- Website: HMP Fosse Way at serco.com

His Majesty's Prison Fosse Way is a Category C men's resettlement prison located in Glen Parva, Leicestershire, England. Fosse Way Prison is managed by Serco and was constructed on the site of the former HMP Glen Parva. The prison was opened in May 2023, and reached full capacity in February 2024.

It consists of seven houseblocks, containing up to 245 prisoners each, and contains facilities for education, training and jobs to help reduce the rates of re-offending once prisoners are released. The Ministry of Justice has referred to it as the first 'smart' prison, due to its use of security technology and interactive workshops.

== History ==
=== Background and construction ===
The prison was developed on the site of HM Prison Glen Parva, a young offenders institution which closed in 2017 and was subsequently demolished. The project was part of the UK government's New Prisons Programme, a £4 billion initiative intended to create 20,000 additional prison places.

Construction was led by Lendlease and commenced in August 2020. The facility was built using a "Design for Manufacture and Assembly" (DfMA) approach, which involved the off-site fabrication of over 12,000 precast concrete panels and 2,000 window units. The total construction cost was reported to be approximately £286 million.

In December 2022, planning permission was granted for an expansion to the original site plans, allowing the construction of an additional houseblock to increase capacity by another 250 prisoners. The name was selected by the local community—the Fosse Way is a Roman road which runs through Leicestershire under parts of the A46.

=== Operational history ===
HMP Fosse Way received its first prisoners on 29 May 2023. It was officially opened on 30 June 2023 by the then-Justice Secretary, Alex Chalk, being referred to by the Ministry of Justice as the first 'smart' prison. According to Serco, the prison uses "cutting-edge technology" to ensure the security of staff and prisoners. It also contains 24 workshops, including a simulator for learning to drive construction vehicles, machinery for making spectacles, and facility for building concrete components and lighting equipment. The Key4Life charity operates at the prison.

The Independent Monitoring Board (IMB) annual report covering the period from June 2024 to May 2025 documented ten deaths in custody, including one homicide and one self-inflicted death. In response to these ongoing safety concerns, Nottinghamshire Healthcare NHS Foundation Trust withdrew from its delivery contract at the prison in April 2025.

In March 2025, HM Inspectorate of Prisons (HMIP) conducted a full unannounced inspection of the facility. The report rated the prison's safety as "not sufficiently good" and noted that the availability of illegal substances was driving internal violence.

The prison originally implemented an "offence-neutral" housing policy, which integrated those convicted of sexual offences within the general population. Following safety concerns and the death of an inmate in 2024, management abandoned this approach.

== Controversies ==
=== Staff misconduct ===
In August 2026, former prison officer Jahvine Kwamba was sentenced to eight months' imprisonment at Leicester Crown Court following an investigation into an inappropriate relationship with an inmate. Kwamba admitted to two counts of misconduct in public office and one charge of transmitting unauthorised images from inside the prison. The court heard that she had sent more than 5,000 messages on Snapchat and accepted thousands of pounds from the prisoner’s family members, who also faced separate prosecution. During sentencing, her defence argued that the prison had placed the inexperienced officer in charge of 64 prisoners after only four months on the job.

=== Death of Mahir Abdulrahman ===
On 20 August 2024, prisoner Mahir Abdulrahman was found dead in his cell following a fatal assault. The prosecution stated that Abdulrahman had previously requested a cell change due to being targeted over his sentence type. In May 2025, Ashirie Smith was found guilty of murder and sentenced to life imprisonment with a minimum term of 17 and a half years. Co-defendant Thierry Robinson was acquitted of murder but convicted of manslaughter, receiving an 11-year prison sentence, while a third individual was acquitted of all charges.

== Notable inmates ==
- Alex Belfield: Former BBC Radio Leeds presenter who served a significant portion of his sentence at HMP Fosse Way before his initial release in June 2025.
