= Nelson Mandela Park =

Park in Leicester, England

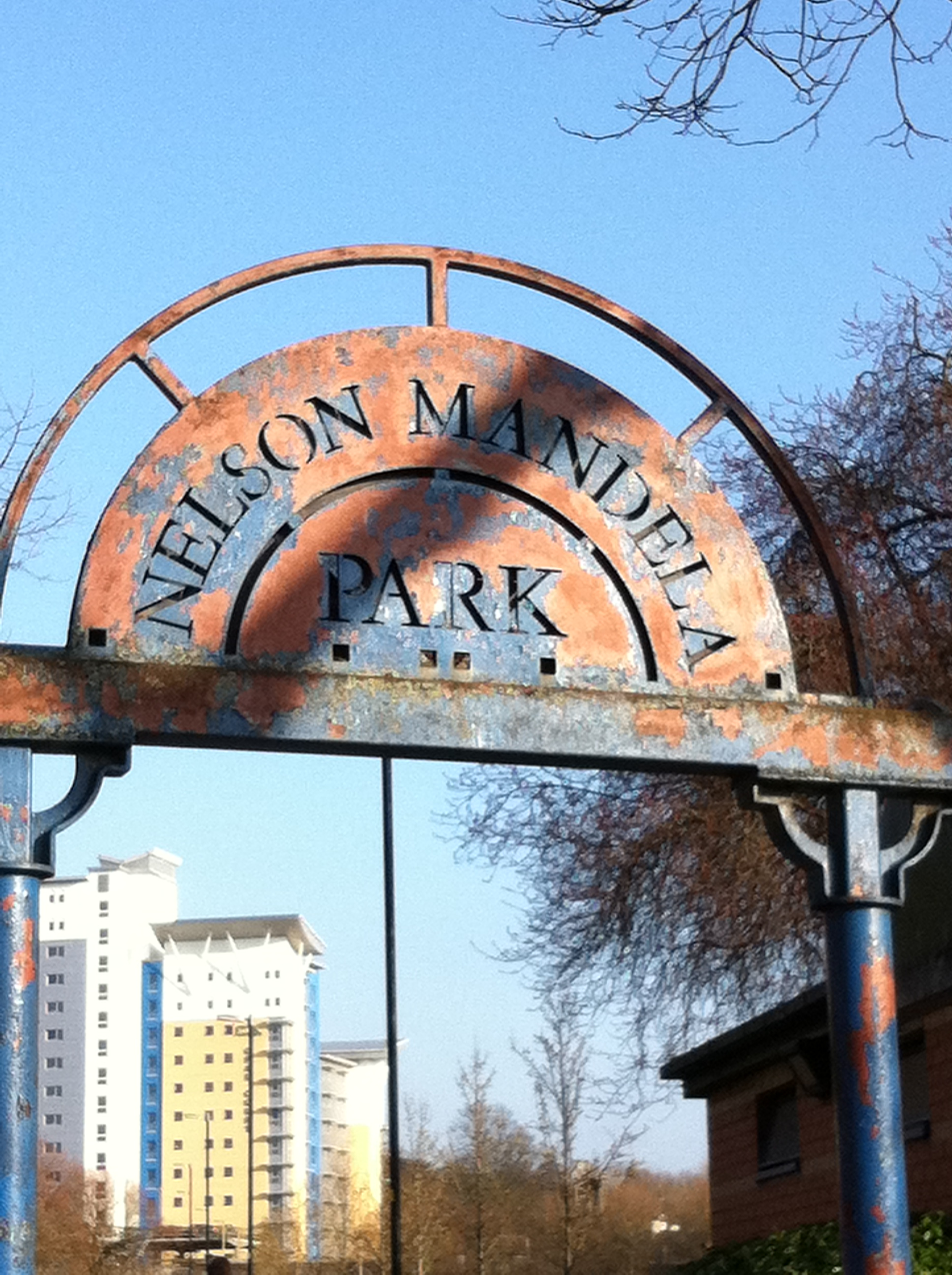
- A sign denoting the entrance to the park.
- Interactive map of Nelson Mandela Park
- Type: Urban park
- Location: Leicester, United Kingdom
- Coordinates: 52.6258°N 1.1312°W
- Created: 6 August 1986
- Operator: Leicester City Council
- Status: Open

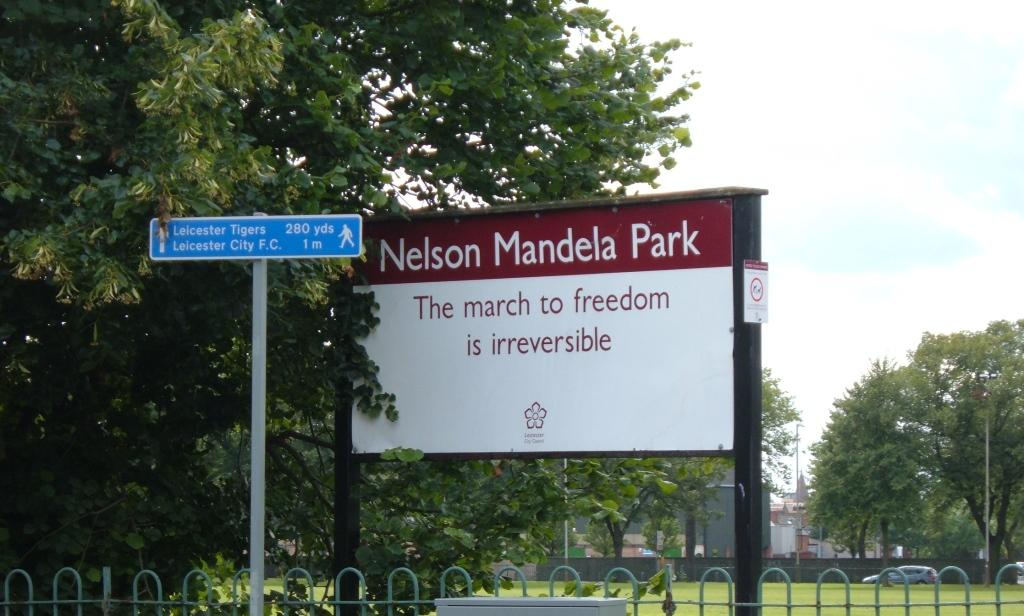
One of the entrances to the park, showing a quote from Nelson Mandela. There are a few different versions of this sign in the park.

The Nelson Mandela Park is a public park in Leicester, England. It is situated just inside the city centre near Leicester Prison and the Leicester Tigers' Stadium. It was known as Welford Road Recreation Ground before it was renamed to celebrate Nelson Mandela.

The park's facilities include a small children's play area, flood-lighting, and public toilets. As of March 2017, a selection of outdoor gym equipment has been installed opposite the children's play area. This is similar to that previously installed in Victoria Park, Leicester. Various sports clubs use this green for practice meetings. Leicester Tigers Rugby Club were a user of this area before the club went fully professional.

On Friday 1 August 2007, the local council held "Nelson Mandela Sports Festival", as a celebration of 21 years of the park having held the name. Important people of the community were present including Councillor Gary Glendon Hunt (1956), the Lord Mayor of Leicester. At the event, 21 trees were planted to mark the 21 years of the park and the 21 wards of Leicester. The event was filmed so it could be given to Nelson Mandela himself to watch.
