= Highcross Leicester =

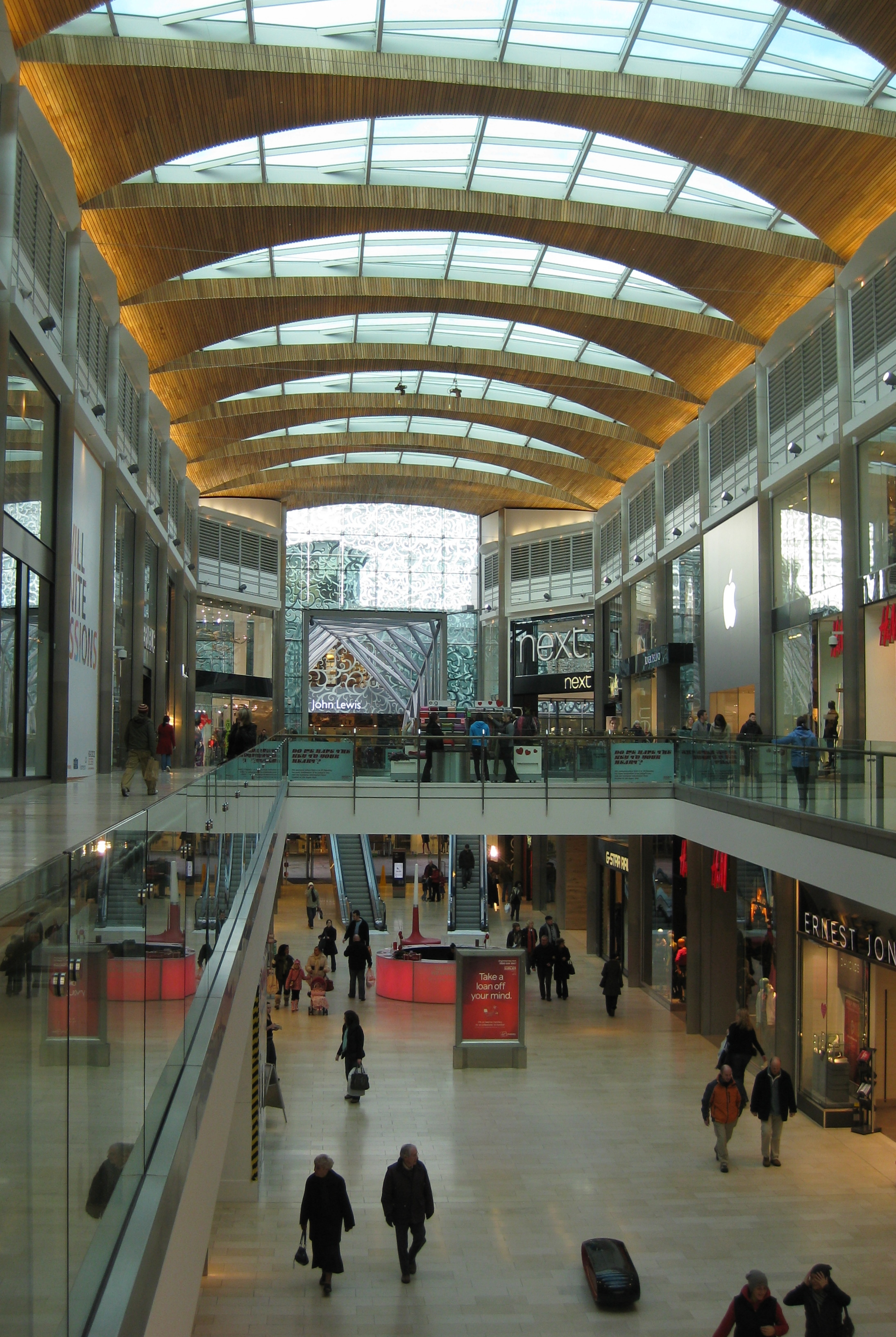
- The interior of part of the covered extension
- Location: Leicester, England
- Coordinates: 52°38′11.00″N 1°8′8.00″W
- Address: 5 Shires Lane
- Opened: 1991 (extension opened 4 September 2008)
- Developer: Hammerson; Hermes Real Estate
- Architect: Foreign Office Architects (Highcross extension)
- Num. of stores: 140
- Num. of anchor tenants: 1
- Floor area: 110,000 m^{2} (1,200,000 sq ft)
- Floors: 2 (up to 4 in department stores)
- Parking: 3000 spaces
- Website: highcrossleicester.com

Highcross Leicester is a shopping centre in Leicester, England. It was opened as The Shires in 1991 to supplement the Haymarket Shopping Centre, also since re-developed. It was built on a central location within the city centre on Eastgates and High Street. Frontages of buildings that were demolished were retained and new external construction was in a 'neo-Victorian' vernacular. An extension opened in 1994, with a frontage on to Church Gate. A further large extension opened in 2008, when the entire centre was renamed Highcross Leicester. Highcross Leicester contains over 100 shops, with a range of both large and smaller units, including branches of the department stores John Lewis & Partners. There are also 40 restaurants and cafés, a Showcase Cinema de Lux and two large car parks.

== The Shires becomes Highcross Leicester ==
The most recent extension, known as Shires West during the planning and early construction phases, doubles the retail space available. This extension lies between the former Shires and the inner ring-road. It includes a John Lewis department store and a Cinema de Lux, the only multiplex cinema in the city centre. There are also two new public squares, residential apartments, a bus interchange and a further 2000-space car park on the opposite side of the ring road, linked by a glass footbridge, which replaces one of the earlier Shires car parks that was demolished to make way for the new extension. Other new tenants include designer fashion brands G-star, Lacoste, Hugo Boss and Zara, and there is also an Apple Store . Thirteen new restaurants and cafés signed up to open in the new centre. The extension makes Highcross Leicester the largest shopping centre in the East Midlands.

The Showcase Cinema de Lux and John Lewis parts of the centre mark the UK début of architecture firm Foreign Office Architects. The cinema is covered in a slightly buckled, stainless steel cladding, while the department store features two layers of glass, each with a swirling fabric design from John Lewis's archives, allowing light in and a view out, but obscuring the interior from the outside. The use of a fabric pattern recognises Leicester's past as a textile-producing city.

An open day was held on Sunday, 1 June 2008 to show the people around the new development. More than a thousand people attended. The newly extended and refurbished shopping centre opened to the public on 4 September 2008 with over 125,000 visitors and over a million visitors in its first two weeks. The new extension cost £350 million to construct and has been the largest regeneration project in the city for many years.

=== Naming controversies ===
On 14 July 2006, it was announced that the entire centre would be renamed the Highcross Quarter, relating to a Highcross that used to stand in what is now Highcross Street. This received a mixed reaction, with criticism directed in particular at the use of the word "quarter" as opposed to "centre".

On 19 July 2007, the principal owners of the development, Hammerson, announced that they had decided to change the new name for the centre to Highcross Leicester. On 23 July 2007, the Leicester Mercury reported that the latest name change had been the result of a year-long dispute with a local coven of witches, who pointed out that "High Cross Quarter" is the name of a high point or major sabbat in the wiccan calendar, and registered five internet domain names relating to the name. Hammerson refused to comment on the dispute, and claimed that the name change was to "give it a stronger identity for customers and raise the profile not only of the development but also the city."

The Daily Telegraph reported on 25 July 2007 that the Highcross Leicester developers had their offer to buy the domain names rejected. Despite Hammerson saying they were no longer interested in the highcrossquarter domain names for the renamed Highcross Leicester development as the name had now "evolved", the Telegraph reported that Hammerson had escalated the matter all the way to the World Intellectual Property Organization (WIPO) in Geneva where it was seeking a ruling on ownership of the highcrossquarter.com domain name. On 30 August 2007, the WIPO ruled against Hammerson's complaint.

== See also ==
- Haymarket Shopping Centre
