= Fosse Shopping Park =

Shopping park in Blaby, Leicester

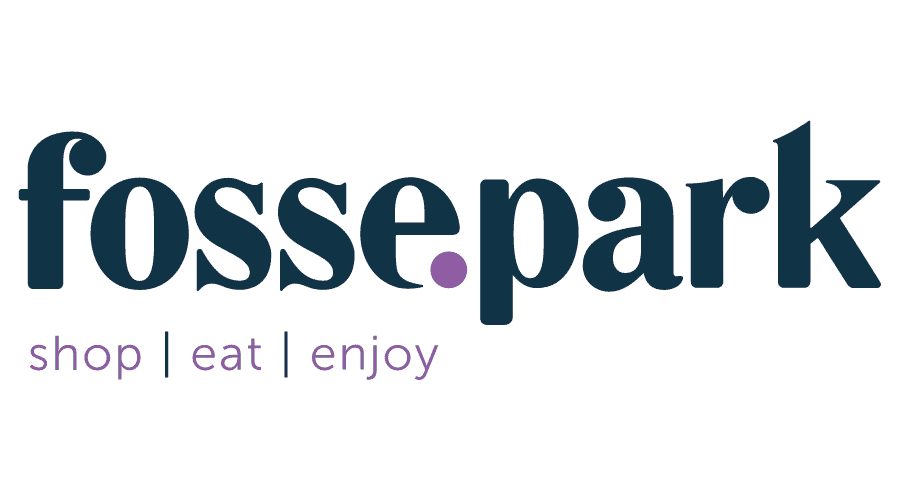

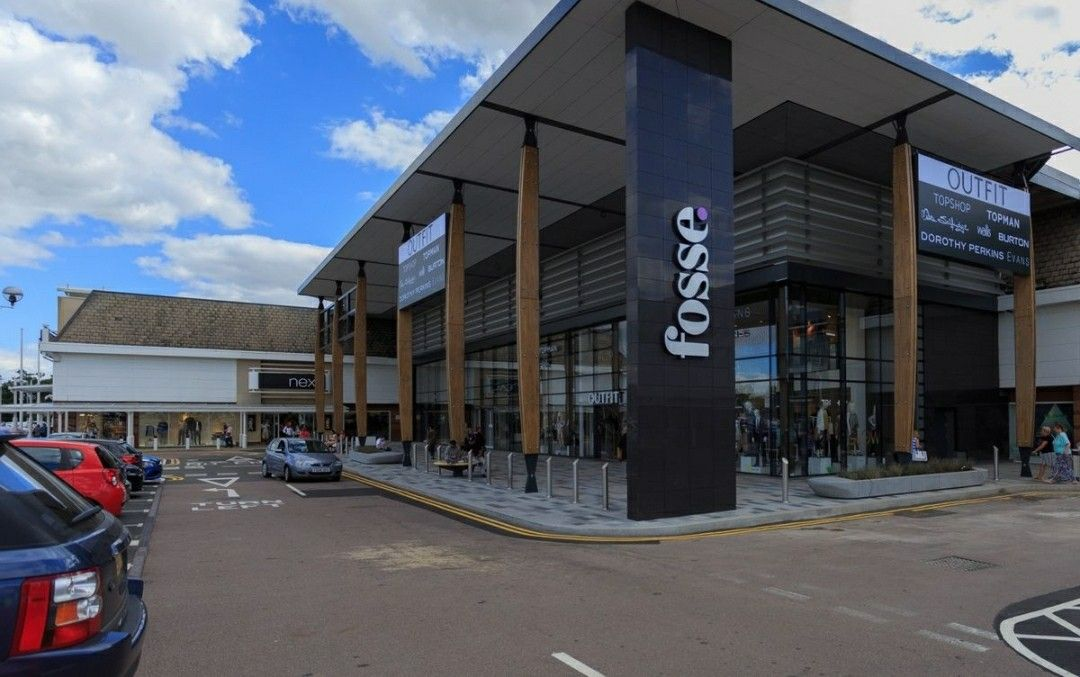
- Coordinates: 52.598°N 1.179°W
- Opened: 1989; 37 years ago
- Developer: London & Edinburgh Trust
- Owner: Crown Estate
- Website: http://www.fossepark.co.uk

Fosse Shopping Park (known simply as Fosse Park) is one of Britain's biggest out-of-town shopping centres and it is situated in Enderby parish, in Blaby district, on the southern edge of the city of Leicester, England.

The retail park is in an area of mixed industrial and commercial development, about half a mile from Junction 21 of the M1, where it meets the M69. Junction 21 also connects the M1 with the A5460 (Narborough Road), from the centre of Leicester, and Leicester's main ring road, the A563. As of 2016, it is one of "about twenty" retail parks owned by the Crown Estate.

== History ==
London & Edinburgh Trust opened Fosse Park in 1989, the 265,000 sq ft (24,600 m^{2}) development contained 12 retail warehouses, including Marks & Spencer as an anchor store. In 1996 Castlemore Securities bought an adjacent factory from the shoe manufacturer and retailer, the Oliver Group, for £25m and obtained a restricted planning consent for Fosse Park South.

In 1997 Pillar Property bought Fosse Park South for £52.5m from Castlemore and the original Fosse Park from SPP (the Swedish pension fund that owns LET) for £60m, thus uniting both halves of the park to create a 416,536 sq ft (38,697.5 m^{2}) investment valued at £205m a year later. In 2004 Pillar attempted to sell Fosse Park, but withdrew when its £320m valuation was not achieved. In 2005 Reit Asset Management bought Fosse Park for £308m, while Pillar's had valued it at £350m. In 2006 Irish investors bought Fosse Park for £360m before placing it on the market once again in 2010.

When opened in 1989, Fosse Park commanded an average rent of £11/sq ft. As of 2010. this has risen to £105/sq ft, higher than any other retail park in the UK.

In April 2021, Fosse Park West and the Food Central extension opened to the public, positioned on the land previously occupied by Everards Brewery. As part of the development there are 8 Tesla Superchargers.

== Stores ==
As of March 2026, retailers within the shopping park are: Boots, Currys, Superdrug, KFC, McDonald's, Marks & Spencer, TK Maxx, Nike, Next, River Island, Holland & Barrett, Foot Asylum, Primark, Flannels, Hobbs, Phase Eight and Whistles, Pandora, Levi Jeans, Zizzi’s, Sports Direct & USC, TGJones (includes a Toys "R" Us concession), JD Sports, New Look and The Perfume Shop.

Marks & Spencer are the longest serving and anchor tenant of the retail park following a recent refurbishment and expansion.

=== Former stores ===
Previous notable tenants of Fosse Park include: Olympus Outdoor World, Shoe City, Mothercare, Adams Kids, Wallis, Habitat, Dorothy Perkins, East Midlands Electricity, Sports Division, JJB Sports, Burton, Gap Inc., BHS, Focus Do It All, Comet and Outfit (including Topshop, Topman, Evans) and upon merging with Currys, the stores of Carphone Warehouse and PC World were closed and moved inside of Currys.

A Tesla pop-up location opened outside of Marks & Spencer in May 2024.

== Transport ==
Fosse Shopping Park is serviced by Arriva East Midlands bus services 50, 87, 104, LC14, X6 and X84, First Leicester service 18, alongside Centrebus services LC17 and the Leicester's Southern-Orbital 40S.

Flixbus services also utilise the stop on Fosse Park Avenue outside ASDA for services to London, Glasgow and Manchester.
