= Haymarket Shopping Centre =

Shopping centre in Leicester, England

- Location: Leicester, England
- Coordinates: 52°38′12.00″N 1°7′55.00″W
- Address: 1 Kildare Walk, City Centre
- Opened: 4 June 1973; 53 years ago
- Owner: Leicester City Council
- Architect: Building Design Partnership
- Num. of stores: 65
- Num. of anchor tenants: Primark, T.K. Maxx, Matalan, B&M
- Floor area: 250,000 sq ft (23,000 m^{2})
- Floors: 2/3 retail, 2 theatre, 3 hotel
- Parking: 500 spaces
- Public transit: Haymarket Bus Station
- Website: haymarketshoppingcentre.com

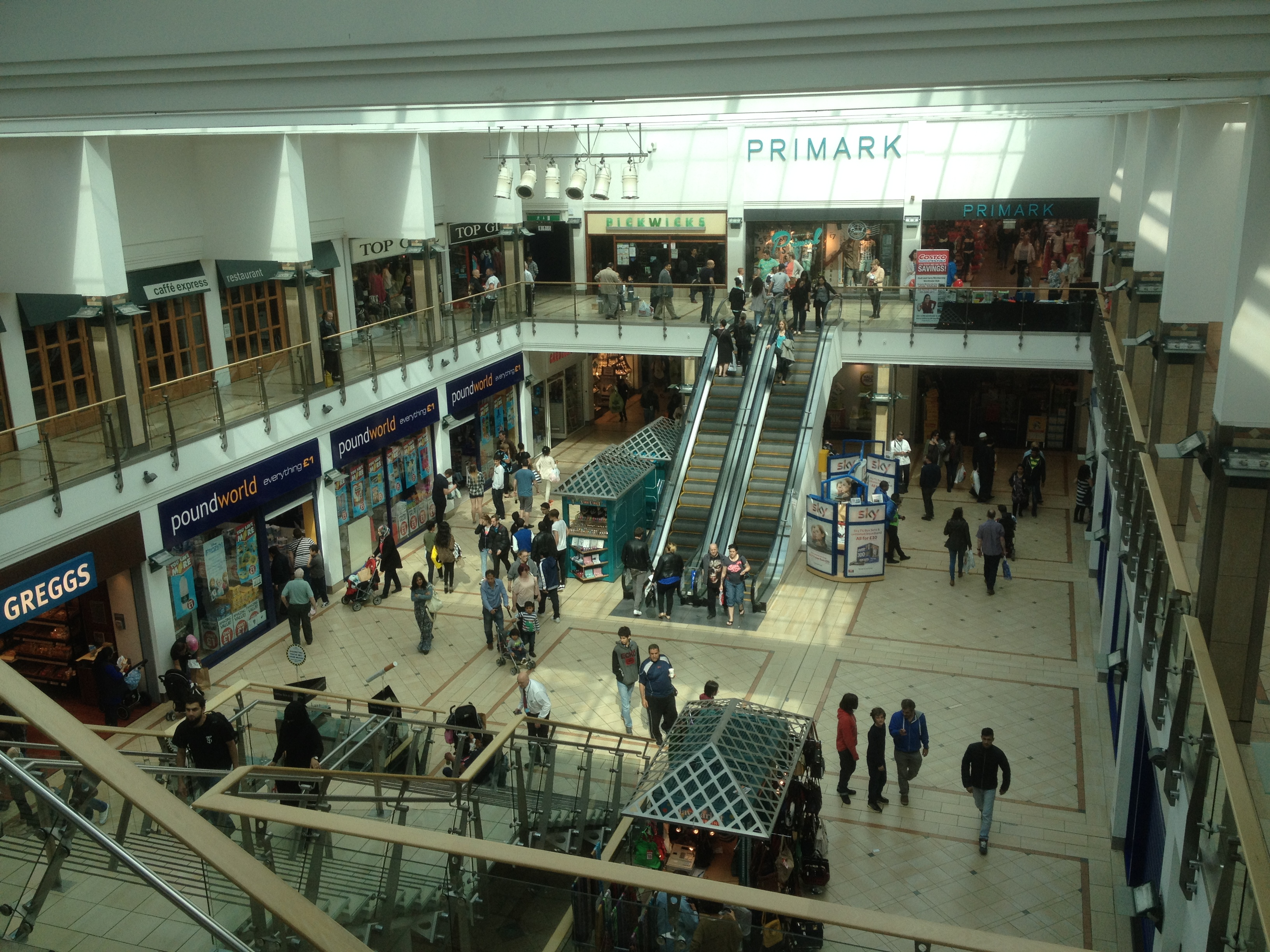
Haymarket Shopping Centre

The Haymarket Shopping Centre is a shopping centre in the city centre of Leicester, England. It was opened on 4 June 1973 as part of the Haymarket Centre and was the country's second shopping centre after the Bull Ring, Birmingham. It is located east of and adjacent to the Clock Tower.

The Haymarket Shopping Centre has around 65 outlets and shares the Haymarket Centre with a bus station, a two-stage theatre, and a Travelodge hotel in the former Haymarket House.

The Haymarket Centre previously featured two nightclubs (located either side of the clock tower entrance), Dino's restaurant (adjacent to the theatre entrance) and two enclosed foot bridges (one crossing Charles Street in to Kildare Street and the other crossing Humberstone Gate linking to Lewis's department store).

During 2021 Leicester City Council purchased the shopping centre for £9.9million

== History ==
Plans for the redevelopment of the Haymarket site were originally drawn up in 1960, but these were superseded by the 1961 declaration of a larger Comprehensive Development Area. Tenders for development of the site were invited, with Taylor Woodrow awarded it in early 1966. The plans originally included a motel, an office block, a 500-seat cinema, and, at the request of the Town Planning (Development) Subcommittee, a 650-seat theatre (later increased to 710), to replace the Phoenix Theatre, which had been built in 1963 as a temporary facility.

In May 1967, the newly built Littlewoods store was opened by Sir Barnett Janner MP. The building is of an imposing concrete construction close to the clock tower. It is four storeys high and features three balconies on the two frontages.

In February 1969, a planning application for the new shopping centre was submitted by Taylor Woodrow, which received conditional approval from Leicester City Council the following month.

In 1970, Lea's store on the corner of Humberstone Gate and Charles Street was demolished to make way for the construction of a new store for C&A. Construction is of standard brick and three storeys high.

During clearance of the site, buildings demolished including four historic hotels (the Bell Hotel, the Stag and Pheasant, the White Hart and the George), and buildings on Bread Street, which ran between Belgrave Gate and Charles Street, and which disappeared completely. Other major buildings originally on the site included a tram depot and the Leicestershire Horse Repository.

Construction of the Haymarket Centre began in 1971 of red brick, linking Littlewoods and C&A (located 120 metres apart). The centre was opened on 4 June 1973. It is six storeys high; levels 1–2 are for retail, levels 3–4 are for car parking, levels 4–6 are Haymarket House and levels 2 plus for the theatre. Level 2 balconies feature on Humberstone Gate and outside the theatre.

In 1993, Lewis's department store was demolished prompting the removal of the foot bridge linking Lewis's and the Haymarket Shopping Centre.

In 1996, the Haymarket Shopping Centre closed for refurbishment. The general colours of brown and beige were replaced with white, a new glass roof was built, and the escalators and staircase switched sides and were replaced with new ones. The toilets were moved from above the clock tower entrance to above the Charles Street entrance. The children's ladybirds ride was removed. The spiral road to the high level car park was demolished in favour of a straight ramp, with access being moved from Charles Street to Belgrave Gate. In a separate, publicly funded project by the Leicester City Council, a row of shops was purchased on Charles Street and demolished in order to build the Haymarket Bus Station.

In 1997, the foot bridge crossing Charles Street was closed; it was removed in 2007.

In May 2006 it was announced that Woolworths were to vacate their unit in the centre in early 2007 after being "made an offer they could not refuse" by the landlords. In October 2007 Peacocks opened in the former Woolworths unit.

The bus station was demolished in 2015, along with two food outlets (McIndians and Subway) and the Bohemian Public House on the corner of Charles Street and Belgrave Gate in order to build a larger bus station.

== Facilities ==
=== Stores ===
Retailers currently occupying units include: Ryman, T.K. Maxx, Holland & Barrett, B&M Bargains, Primark, The Entertainer, Deichmann, Card Factory, Heron Foods, GrapeTree, One Beyond, Cards Direct, Matalan, Tesco Express, Metro Bank, Costa Coffee, Burger King, Halifax Building Society.

A number of independent retailers operate from some of the smaller units within the centre.

Notable stores past and present include Littlewoods (including Index), C&A, Somerfield (later became The Co-operative Food), HMV, British Home Stores, Poundworld and Bargain Buys, Allders, Bejam, MK One, Habitat, Superdrug and Woolworths.

=== Haymarket Theatre ===
Leicester City Council purchased a 99-year lease of the theatre in 1974. The theatre operated until 2007 when it was closed and replaced by the newly built Curve Theatre in Leicester's Cultural Quarter. The theatre was reopened in early 2018.

Located on Belgrave Gate at the front of the entrance to the Haymarket Theatre is The Metal Tree sculpture by Hubert Dalwood ARA. It was unveiled in 1974 and used to be the only piece of major abstract sculpture in Leicester City Centre.

=== Nightclubs ===
To the left of the Clock Tower entrance was the entrance to the George Bar. This took its name from the George Hotel that had previously stood on this site. In 2001 it was called U R Zeus. It opened on 23 September 2005 as Niche, followed in November 2007 by Ice. It closed in 2008 and on 30 May 2009, it opened as the D9 Nightclub.

To the right side of the Clock Tower entrance was the entrance to a nightclub which was located on the first and second floors. This has now been converted to ordinary retail space and is currently occupied by Costa Coffee. This was first known as the Top Rank Suite, Bailey's Nightspot, then changed to The King of Clubs in 1980. It subsequently changed its name to Mr Kiesa's Discothèque, after owner Martin Kiesa.

Bailey's hosted many music and comedy acts such as Tommy Cooper, Bernard Manning, Mud, Slade, Gary Glitter (March 1978), Showaddywaddy, The Three Degrees and The Drifters.

=== Transport ===
Opening in mid 2016, the Haymarket Bus Station has been rebuilt and expanded and now forms a major transport hub for the north of the city centre. It is located on Charles Street to the northeast of the Haymarket Shopping Centre.

== Gallery ==
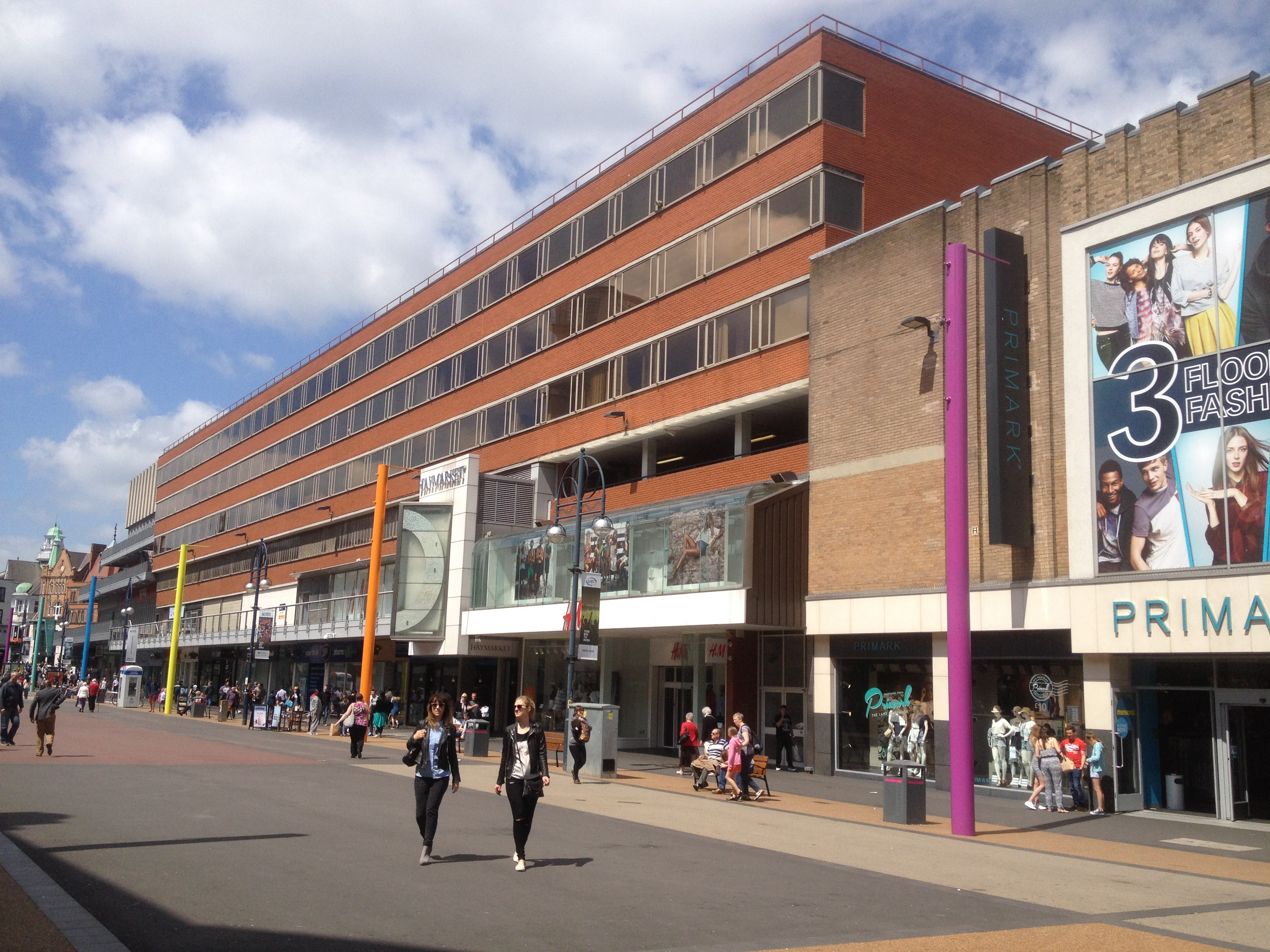
The Haymarket Centre on Humberstone Gate. Note Haymarket House office block in the centre comprising the top three floors.

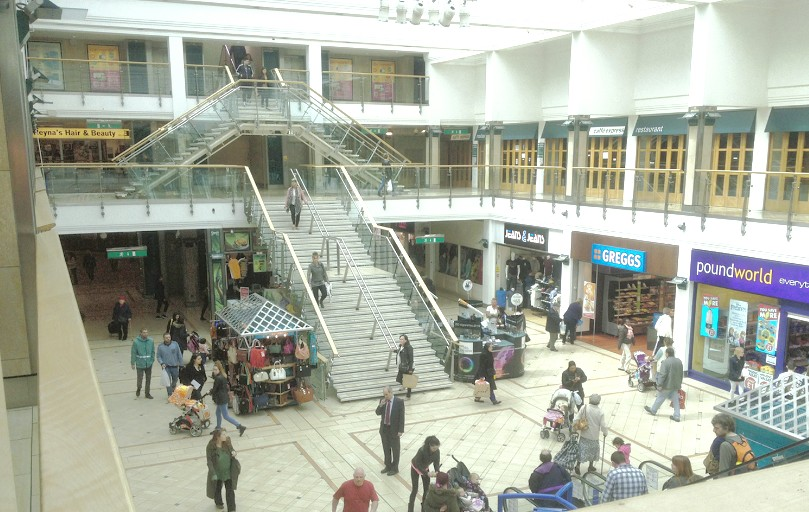
A photo taken in 2015 of the main mall from the escalators outside Primark.

== Notes ==
Haymarket Centre is its original name and the original signage on the outside walls still remain. The term is still used when referring to the whole complex, as opposed to just the mall.

The Haymarket is a common name for the Haymarket Shopping Centre used by the public and more recently, by the centre itself. The Humberstone Gate entrance has the name "The Haymarket" engraved into the floor.

Haymarket is the name of a short section of road, changing to Belgrave Gate after around 75 metres, adjacent to the Haymarket Shopping Centre.
