= Belgrave, Leicester =

Suburb of Leicester, England

Coordinates: 52.65660°N 1.12625°W

Belgrave
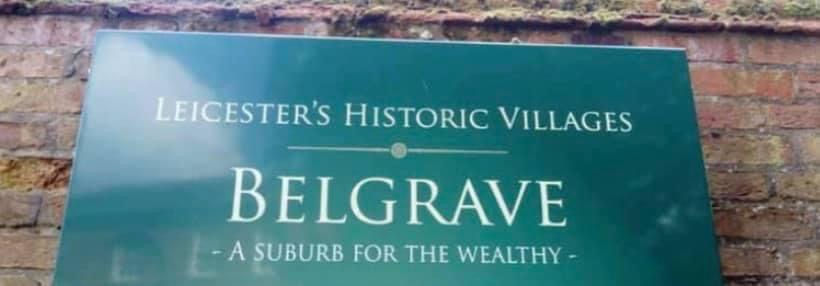

- Location within Leicestershire
- Population: 11,558 (2011)
- Unitary authority: Leicester
- Ceremonial county: Leicestershire
- Region: East Midlands
- Country: England
- Sovereign state: United Kingdom
- Post town: LEICESTER
- Postcode district: LE4
- Dialling code: 0116
- Police: Leicestershire
- Fire: Leicestershire
- Ambulance: East Midlands
- UK Parliament: Leicester East

Belgrave is an area, suburb, electoral ward and administrative division of the city of Leicester, in the ceremonial county of Leicestershire, England. Belgrave is the location of and known for several notable and famous landmarks such as the National Space Centre, Space Park Leicester, Abbey Pumping Station, the Golden Mile and Belgrave Hall. It is also noted for being the location of businesses such as British United Shoe Machinery and Wolsey.

The Old Belgrave Village, containing the Belgrave Conservation Area, including Belgrave Hall, Belgrave House, St Peter's Church and The Talbot Pub is to the west of Loughborough Road and to the east of the River Soar.

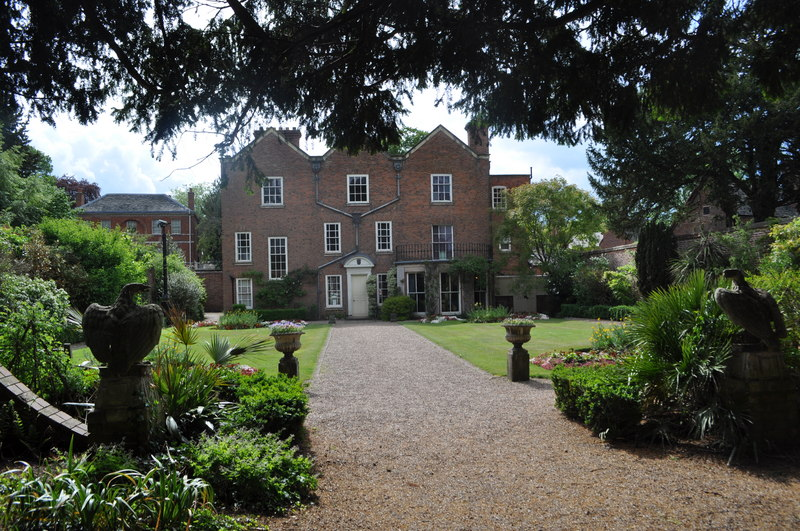
Belgrave Hall

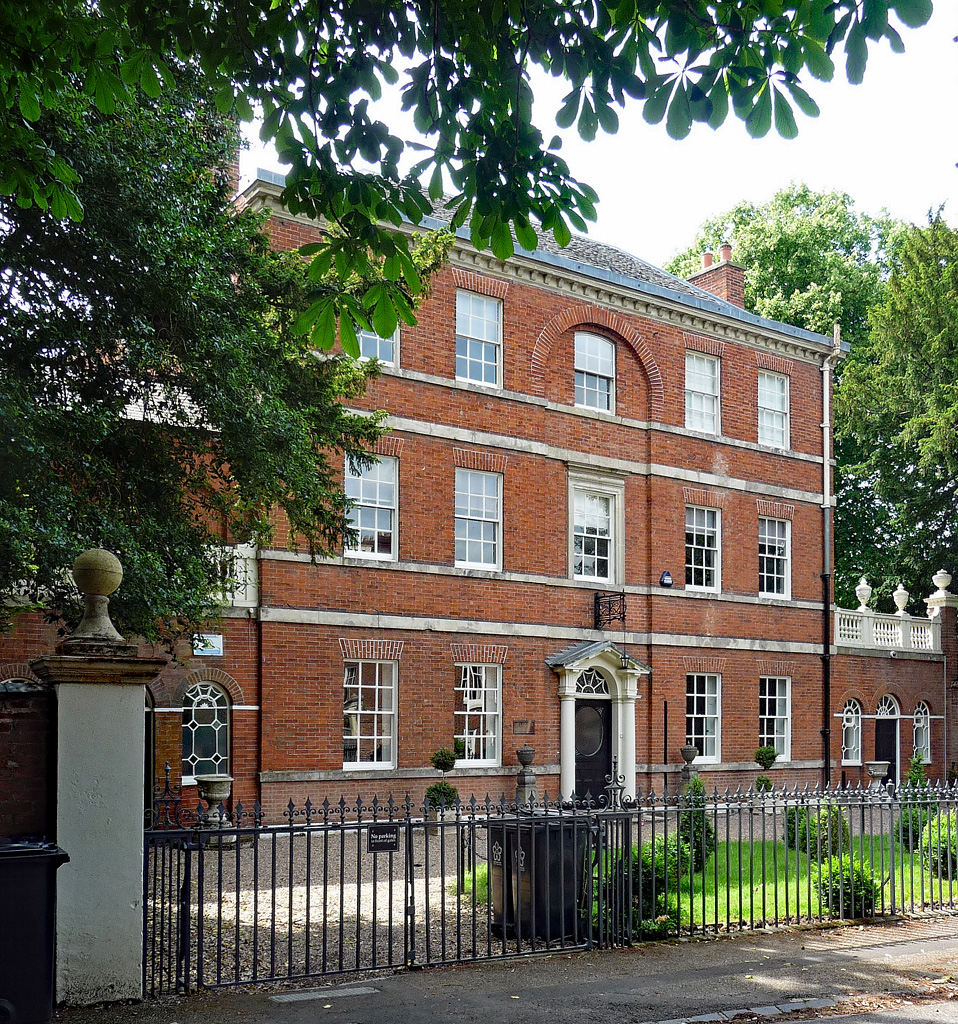
Belgrave House

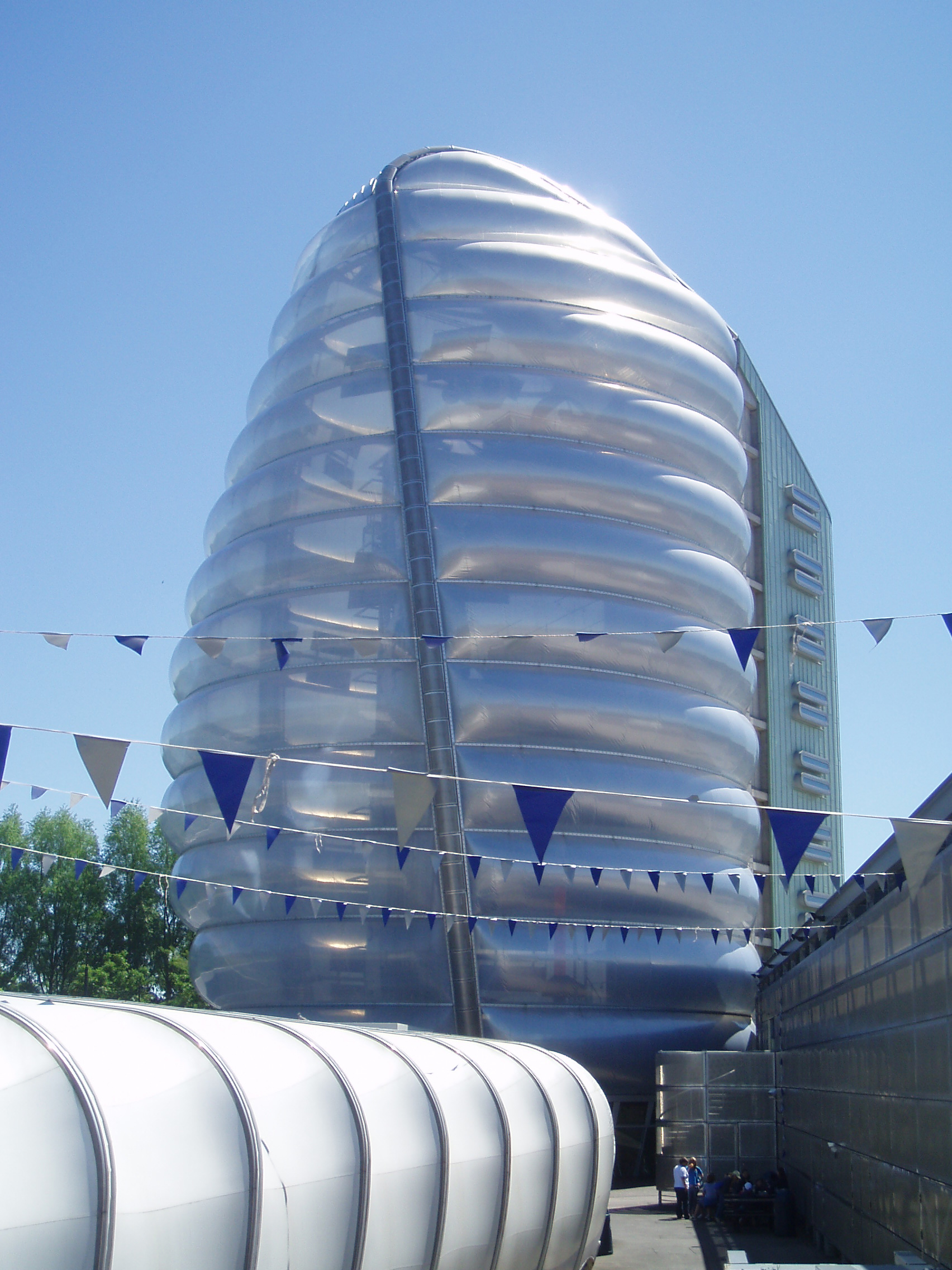
National Space Centre

== Geography ==
The Belgrave Ward within Leicester

Belgrave is bounded by the wards and areas of the suburb of Rushey Mead and the village of Birstall to the north, Spinney Hills, North Evington and Northfields to the east on the other side of the Midland Main Line, St Matthew's and Leicester City Centre to the south and Beaumont Leys and Stocking Farm to the west. It is located just north of the centre of Leicester, in the eastern part of the city. The old village part of Belgrave is close to the Leicestershire county border and the Borough of Charnwood at the beginning of the Leicester Urban Area in that direction which is located on the other side of Red Hill Circle. Belgrave therefore stretches from and adjoins the city centre and the county.

== Etymology ==
The settlement was named in the Domesday Book as Merdegrave (from Old English mearð 'marten' + grāf 'grove'). However, after the Norman Conquest the merde, which means excrement in French, was changed to bel.

== History ==
Belgrave was originally one of Leicestershire’s ancient villages, the first mention of which, under its original Saxon name of Merdegrave (which in old English means Martins grove) appears in Domesday Book of 1086 where it is listed amongst the lands given to Hugh de Grandmesnil. Grandmesnil had fought at the side of William the Conqueror at Hastings and was his chief cavalry commander. As a reward for his services he was granted several manors/lands by the King, of which this was one. The land consisted of a mill, 24 acres (97,000 m^{2}) of meadow and land for six ploughs. For centuries afterwards Belgrave continued as a small agricultural village.

The Bishops Fee included Belgrave.

During the Middle Ages Belgrave became one of Leicestershire’s wealthier livings. In the thirteenth century its value rocketed. In 1217 it was valued at 16 marks, at 30 in 1254 and at 60 in 1291.

Back in the 14th Century Thurcaston Road was one of the country's most important roads. On a map of 1675 it is shown as part of the great road from London to Manchester and Carlisle and its importance was further recognised when it became a tumpike (toll road) in 1784. A bridge existed on Thurcaston Road in 1357 although the current medieval one dates from the 15th Century.

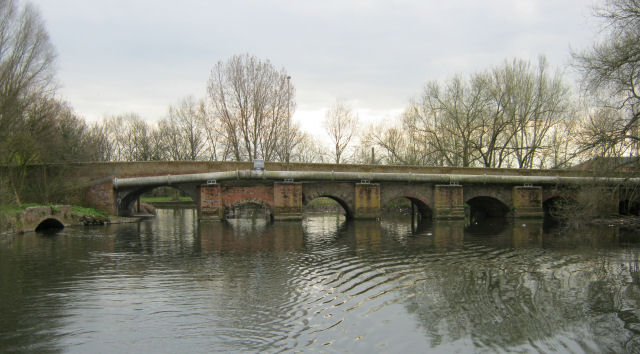
Medieval Bridge on Thurcaston Road

Another important influence on Belgrave was the construction of The Leicester Navigation in 1791. A canal was dug to the south and north of the village to provide a passage for barges where the River Soar was unsuitable for navigation. It helped industry in the town, bringing coal, limestone, state and wool into Leicester and taking hosiery and other finished goods out. The wharf in Belgrave Village, just south of the bridge was the offloading point for Mountsorrel Granite. The medieval bridge had to be widened to allow the barges to pass through.

Belgrave was one of the communities in Leicestershire that experienced the shock of military confrontation because of its situation on the busy London to Derby road which cut right through the heart of the village unlike neighbouring Birstall and Wanlip which it bypassed by some hundreds of yards.

When the English Civil War burst violently into Belgrave, records indicate that there were a number of skirmishes between the opposing forces around the Thurcaston Road Bridge and inside St Peter's Church. There is damage to the Tudor Memorial to Ambrose de Belgrave which suggests that it may have been used for target practice.

With large 19th century terraced developments along the A607 (Belgrave Road and Melton Road), this area now has a large, vibrant Asian community featuring the "Golden Mile". The Asian community based in and around Belgrave and Melton Road have been residents since the early 1970s.

In 1975 the old area of the village was declared a Conservation area and it is this area that represents the nucleus of the ancient village.

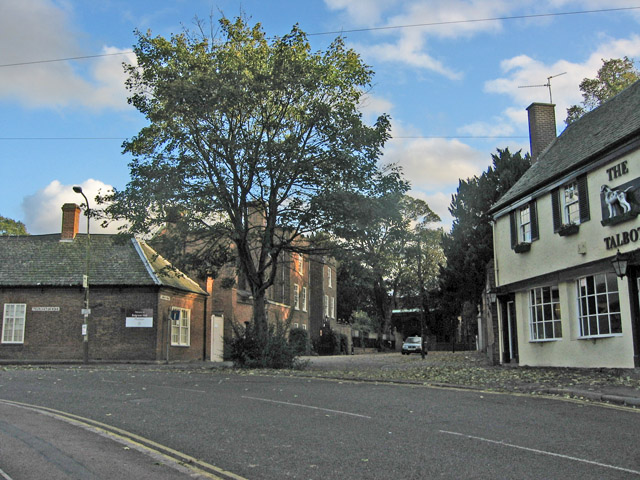
Belgrave Village

Belgrave is home to Belgrave Hall and Gardens. Belgrave Hall, built between 1709 and 1713 in a plain classical style is in the midst of two acres of serene walled gardens. It has changed hands many times but the owners have always played a major role in the economic, social and charitable life of the community. It is very well known for Paranormal Activity.

St Peter's Church is the oldest building in the local conservation area. It has the most magnificent Norman doorway in England. Archaeologists believe that there may be an earlier Saxon church beneath the present structure. Sightings of Apparitions have also been seen.

The Talbot Inn, named after the Talbot Hound, a white hunting Dog dates from the 18th Century and has origins in the 14th century, when it was a popular stop providing bed and board to those who travelled through Leicester along Loughborough Road. Originally a three-storey coaching inn on a major road, the second storey was removed in 1958 after a fire. It is said that The Talbot was the last place a criminal could get a meal or drink on their way to be executed. Their bodies were then returned to the Inn's outbuildings, which also served as a morgue. Paranormal Activity has been reported at The Talbot.

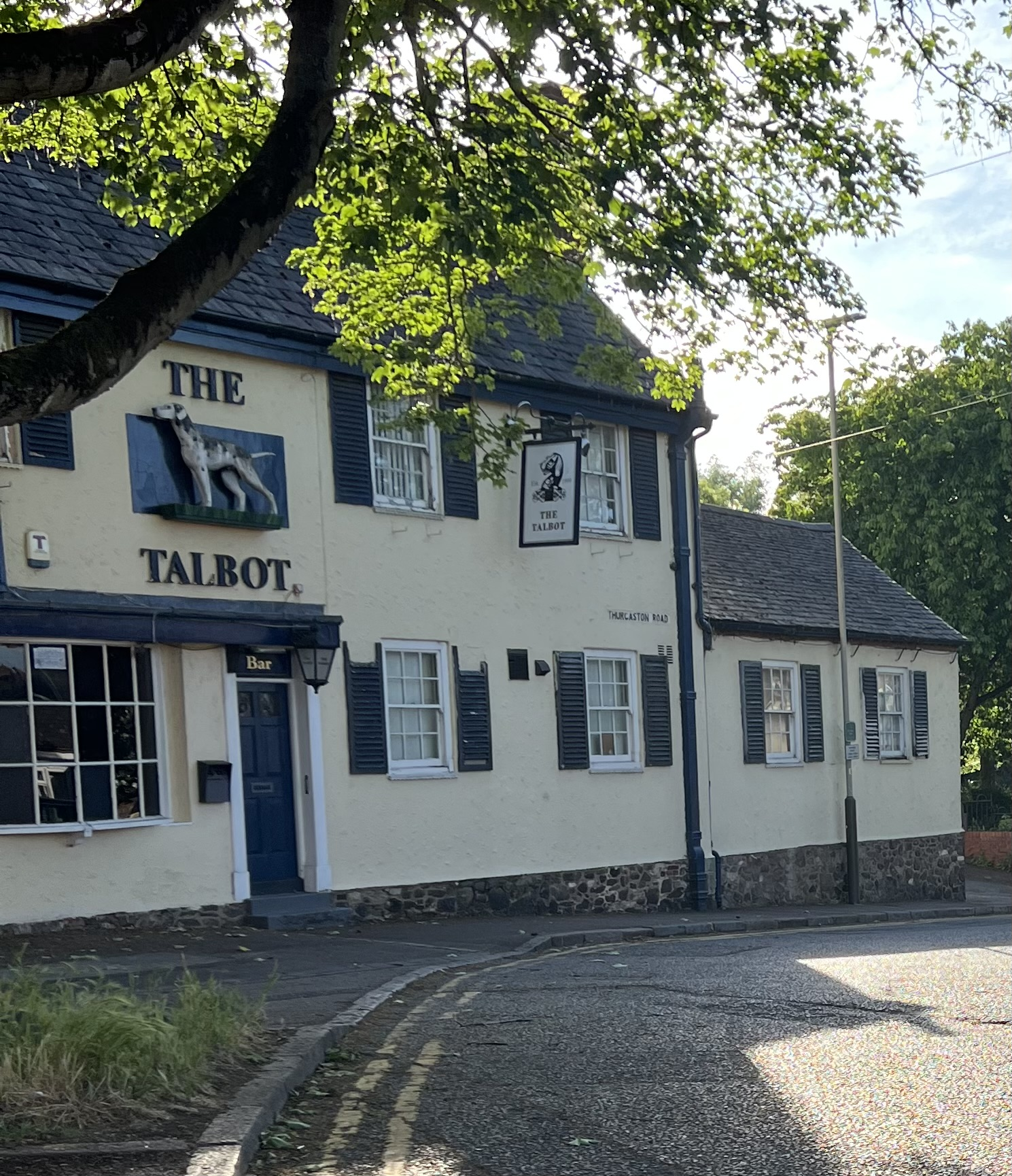
The Talbot

Belgrave House was built in 1776.

Cross Corners on Thurcaston Road was built by James Vann at the same time that his brother William built Belgrave House. During World War One Belgian refugees were accommodated here and in the 1920s it became a home for “mentally deficient” boys. The building is now owned by Leicester City Council and in 2003 Cross Corners Community Arts Centre opened there.

Tho National School on the corner of Loughborough Road and Thurcaston Road was built in 1861 and stands on the site of the original Bull's Head Pub. Alfred Ellis, who lived opposite in Cross Corners, disliked the “sordid” and “run-down” pub so bought and demolished it, giving the land for a new school. A new Bull's Head was built opposite the school on Bath Street a few years later. By 1877 the school had 350 pupils. It closed in 1974 and is now owned by a firm of solicitors. The Clock was bought to commemorate Queen Victoria's Golden Jubilee of 1887.

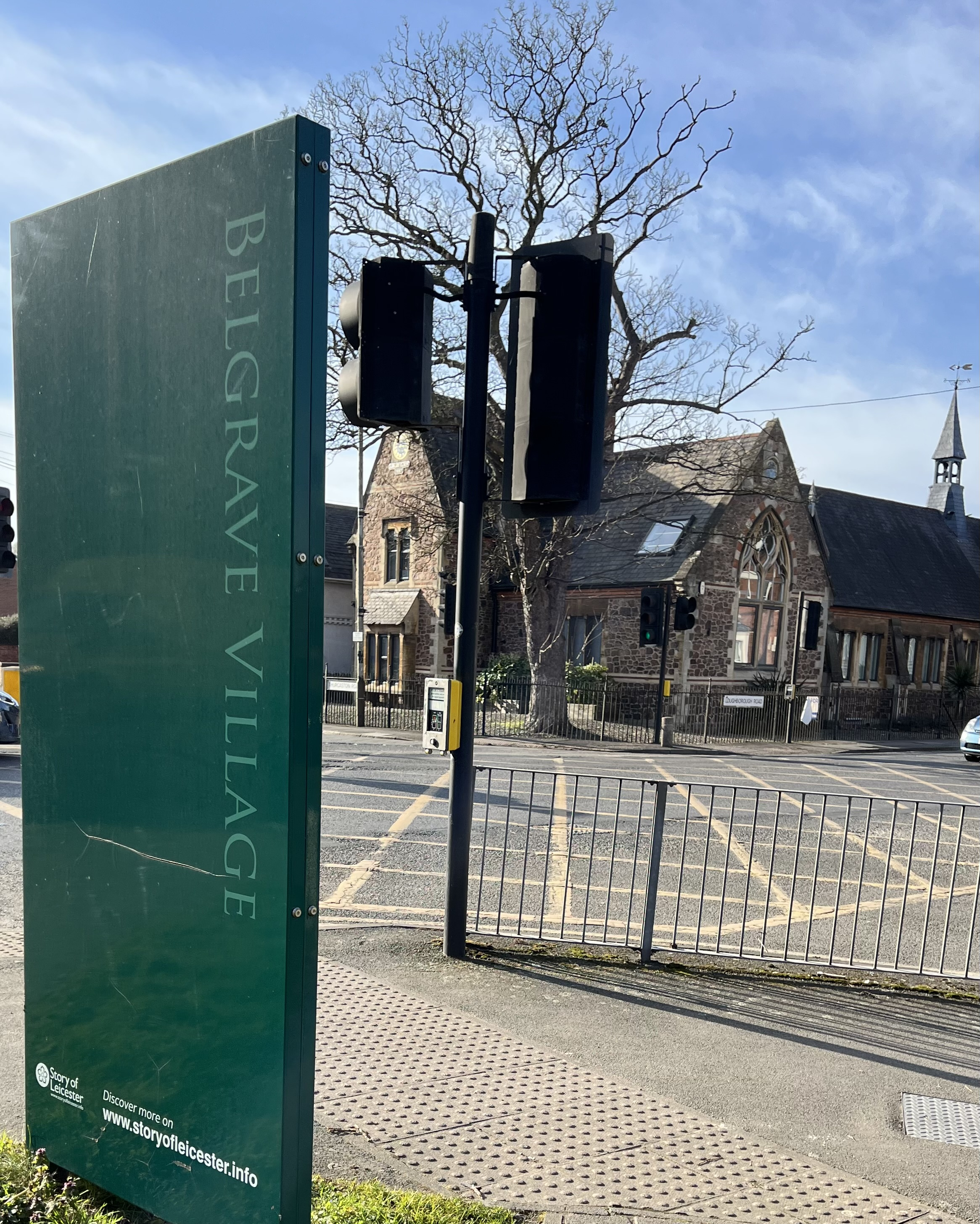
The National School

As Belgrave grew it became important enough to be linked to Leicester by Horse Tram. The first route of the new Leicester Tramways Company Ltd in 1874 was from the Clock Tower to the Loughborough Road and Thurcaston Road Junction. Electric Trams replaced Horse Trams in 1904.

As can be seen by some of the Houses along Loughborough Road there were some very wealthy residents, including the Chief constable of Leicester at one point.

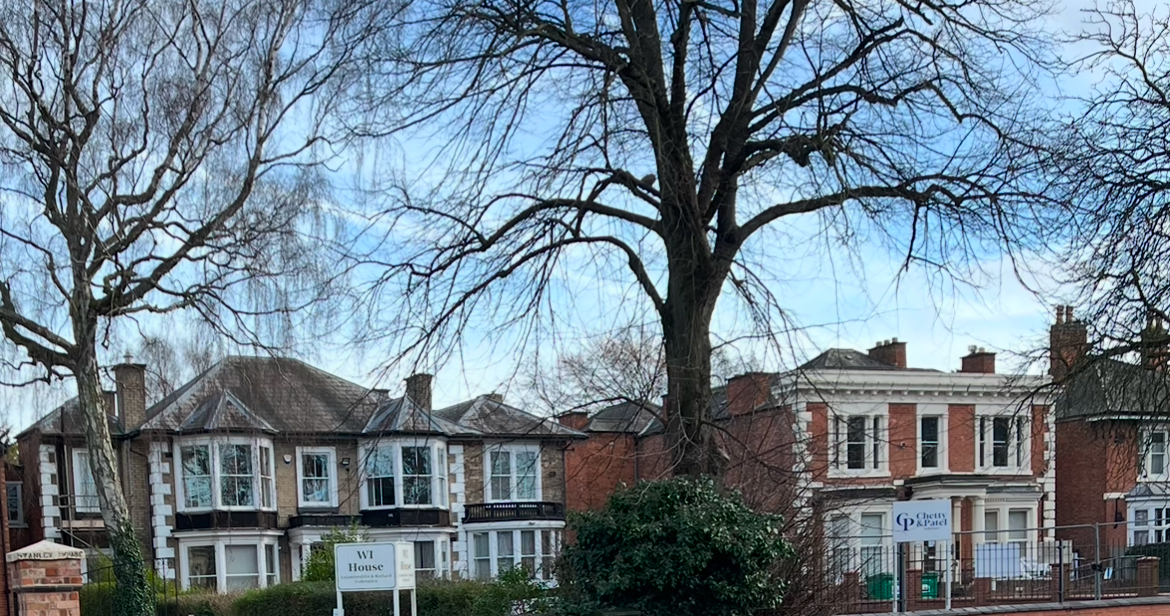
Buildings on Loughborough Road in Belgrave

As the wealth of the area grew so did the population and by the late 19th century many more houses were being built.

As Belgrave grew so did the town of Leicester. In 1891 the parish had a population of 11,405. On 31 October 1891 most of the parish became part of the County Borough of Leicester, on 26 March 1896 the parish was abolished to form Leicester.

The area continued to expand with some of the earlier 19th century houses being replaced by 1930s semis. By the 1960s and 1970s large parts of Belgrave were cleared of the old Victorian terraced houses including Mellor School, the Baptist Church on Loughborough Road and Claremont Street Methodist Church, and were replaced with more modern structures.

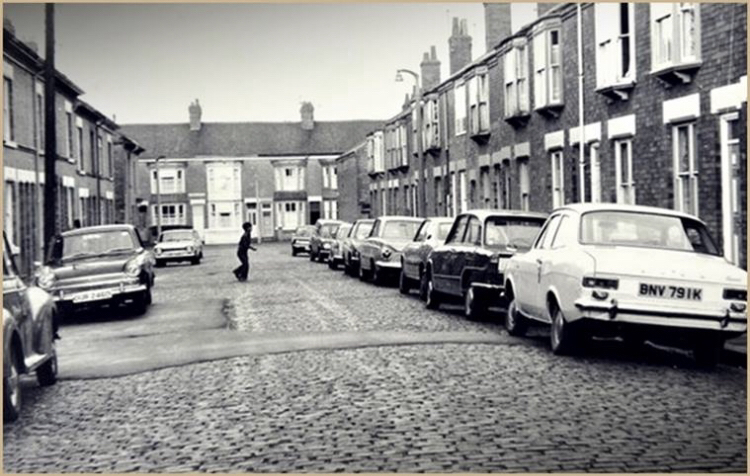
The Cobbled Agar Street in Belgrave, pictured in the 1970s

Cobbled Agar Street was an Unadopted Road.

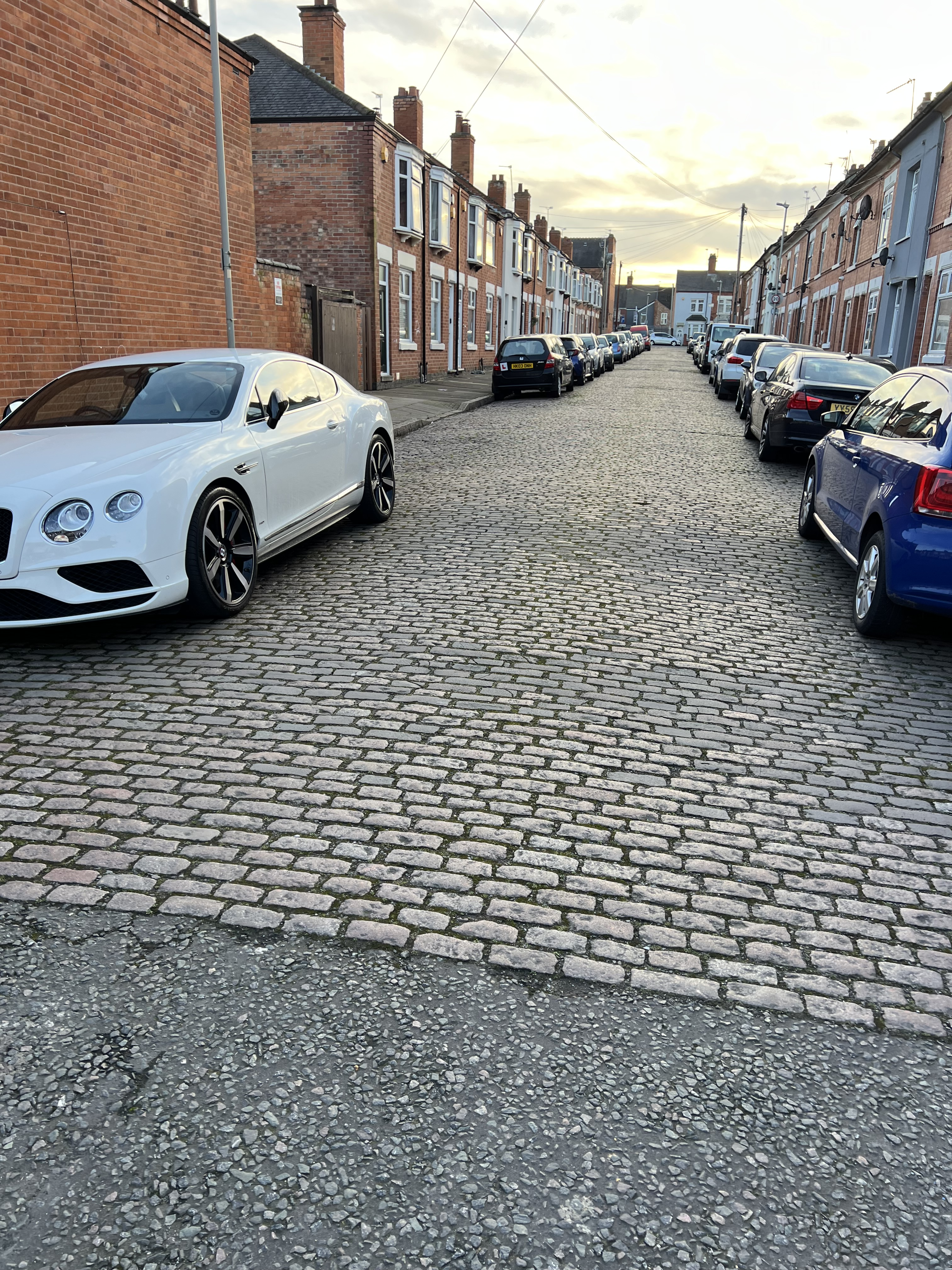
Agar Street in 2026

The Belgravians were a very close-knit community at one time. If there had been a misdemeanour in the village and the miscreant was a local then it would be highly unlikely that the culprit would be brought to book. In the early 1900s one of the more popular forms of recreation for the men would be the little gambling schools. In summer they would meet up around the fields by the River Soar for a few rounds of 'Pitch and Toss', a simple game where players would place some pennies either Heads or Tails up and the ‘Chucker’ would throw a penny and whichever side it landed was the winner. The Constabulary took a dim view of such practices however and on one memorable Friday evening a notoriously keen police inspector crept up on a small party. He appeared and declared ‘I’ve got you now‘ and the men did no more than throw the furious policeman into the River. The next day when enquiries were launched to track down the culprits, nobody knew anything. As a result, Belgrave earned another title of 'Dummy Town', as if there was any trouble then everybody acted dumb.

Mountsorrel he mounted at,

Rodely he rode by,
Onelep he leaped o'er,
At Birstall he burst his gall,

At Belgrave he was buried at.

Folk rhyme about a giant called Bell who boasted that he could reach Leicester in three leaps,
mentioning Belgrave, the city suburb in this direction and mentioning Wanlip, a nearby village as Onelep, a pun on "One Leap".

Belgrave Flyover, which connected the area with the City Centre was demolished in 2014, being replaced by Belgrave Circle Roundabout.

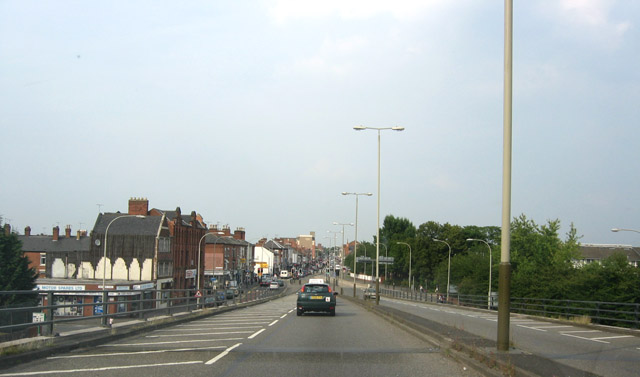
Belgrave Flyover, heading towards Belgrave from the City Centre

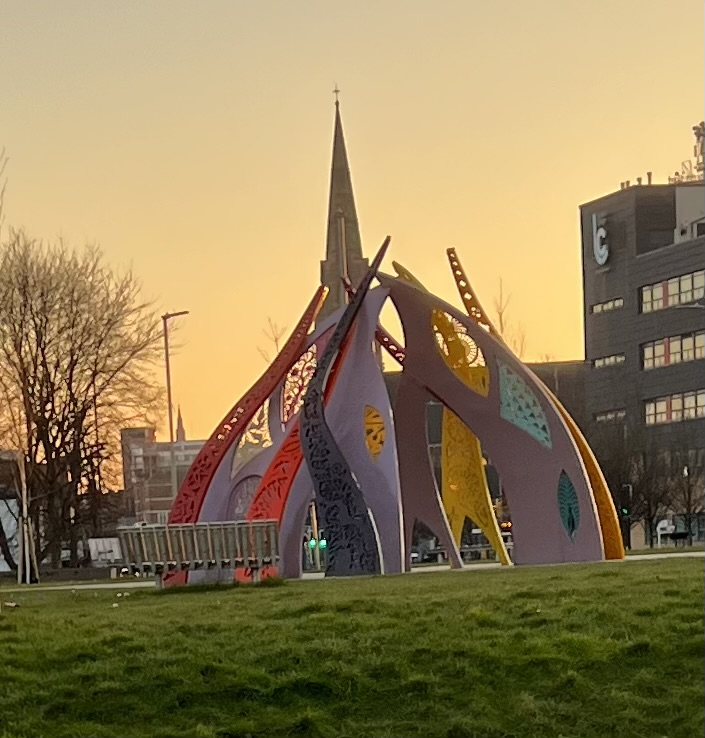
Belgrave Circle Sculpture

The 2022 Leicester unrest happened in Belgrave.

== Historic production ==
Belgrave based British United Shoe Machinery, formed around the turn of the 20th century as a subsidiary of United Shoe Machinery Company of the United States became part of a group which for most of the 20th century was the world's largest manufacturer of footwear machinery and materials, exporting shoe machinery to more than 50 countries. In the 1960s and 1970s it was Leicester's biggest employer, employing more than 4,500 locally and 9,500 worldwide. Most of the workforce was recruited via an apprentice scheme which trained a large proportion of Leicester's engineers. The company had "a respected reputation for technical innovation and excellence", between 1898 and 1960 it developed and marketed nearly 800 new and improved shoe machines and patented more than 9,000 inventions, at one time employing 5% of the UK's patent agents.

Wolsey, a heritage British clothing brand founded in 1755, making it one of the oldest existing textile companies in the world was based in Belgrave.

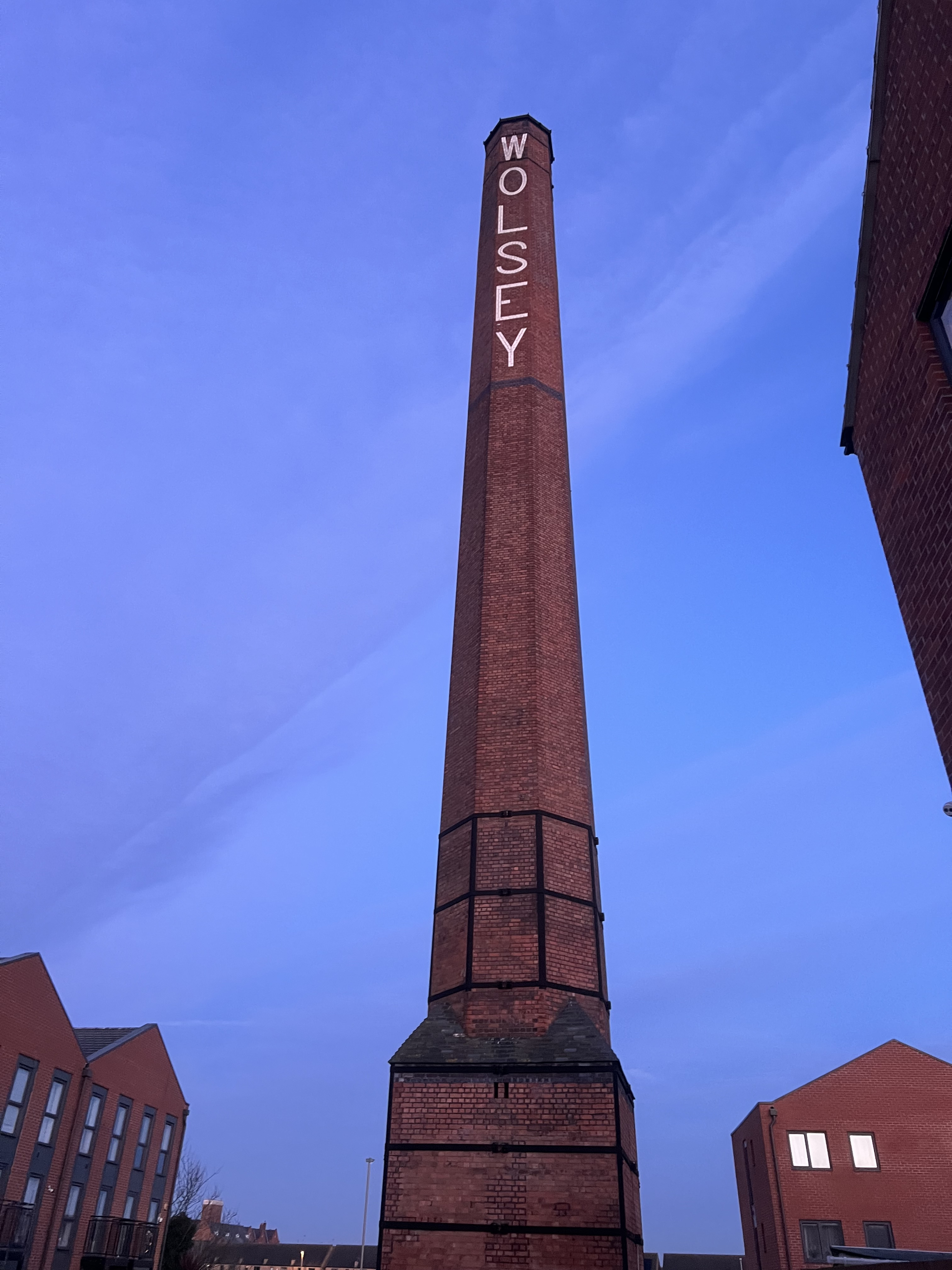
Wolsey Chimney, pictured in 2025

Parker Plant in Belgrave opened in 1911 inside a single railway arch. The business relocated to an 18-acre site in 1926. In the 1950s, 60s and 70s they were employing over 1,400 people to meet demand. In 1969, 1978 and in 1994 the business won the prestigious Queen's Award for Enterprise. In 2006 Universal Conveyors was acquired and in 2007 Phoenix Parker Holdings Ltd was formed. In 2014 Phoenix Transworld, Cartem & Universal Conveyors marketed under the Parker brand.

Walkers Midshire Foods - Walkers Deli & Sausage Co, part of Samworth Brothers is on the Cobden Street Industrial Estate in Belgrave. The Business specialises in the manufacturing of Premium Sliced Cooked Meats and Sausages as well as being the largest producer of Pate in the UK.

== Demographics ==
The Belgrave area has become home to affluent Indian-origin East African Hindus.

The area, since the 1970s has had a large Asian population and is now predominately Asian. It has become an example of a Little India.

According to the 2001 UK census 104 Pacific Island born people were residing in Belgrave, with many more being of Pacific Islander descent. This is the largest number for any location in the UK.

=== As of the 2011 census ===
The population of Belgrave was 11,558 and is made up of approximately 51% females and 49% males.

The average age of people in Belgrave is 36, while the median age is lower at 34.

43.0% of people living in Belgrave were born in England. Other top answers for country of birth were 28.4% India, 5.6% Kenya, 3.2% Sri Lanka, 1.6% Africa not otherwise specified, 0.8% Pakistan, 0.6% Zimbabwe, 0.4% Somalia, 0.3% Bangladesh, 0.2% Scotland.

46.7% of people living in Belgrave speak English as their main language. The other top languages spoken are 35.8% Gujarati, 4.3% Punjabi, 3.3% Tamil, 1.3% Portuguese, 0.9% South Asian Language, 0.9% Polish, 0.9% Hindi, 0.9% Urdu, 0.6% Somali.

The religious make up of Belgrave is 54.6% Hindu, 14.3% Christian, 14.1% Muslim, 6.4% No religion, 5.5% Sikh, 0.3% Buddhist. 443 people did not state a religion. Four people identified as Jedi knights.

48.1% of people are married, 4.0% cohabit with a member of the opposite sex, 0.5% live with a partner of the same sex, 28.9% are single and have never married or been in a registered same sex partnership, 7.5% are separated or divorced. There are 487 widowed people living in Belgrave.

The top occupations listed by people in Belgrave are Elementary at 20.6%, Process, plant and machine operatives at 18.7%, Elementary administration and service at 14.3%, Sales and customer service at 13.1%, Sales at 10.7%, Sales Assistants and Retail Cashiers at 9.8%, Administrative and secretarial at 9.6%, Caring, leisure and other service at 9.2% and Process Operatives at 8.5%.

== Education ==
=== Schools in the area ===
Primary schools: Belgrave St Peter's Church of England Primary, Mellor Community Primary, Catherine Infants and Catherine Juniors, St Patrick's Catholic Primary, Abbey Primary and Rushey Mead Primary.

Secondary schools:

Rushey Mead Academy, which is the best state-funded secondary school in Leicester and Leicestershire and Soar Valley College.

College:

Leicester College – Abbey Park Campus.

== Places of interest ==
- Belgrave Hall – An-18th century Hall owned at one point by the MP and Businessman John Ellis. It is known for its paranormal happenings and has been subject to world media attention. It was a museum but is now an events venue and is occasionally used for public events with the gardens opening periodically throughout the year.
- The Belgrave Conservation Area – Includes Belgrave Hall, Belgrave House, St Peter's Church and The Talbot Pub.
- The Golden Mile – famed for its Indian restaurants, sari shops, jewellers, annual winter illuminations and its internationally renowned annual Diwali celebrations, the largest of their kind outside of India. The road sells the most gold in all of Europe.
- The National Space Centre – museum and educational resource covering the fields of space science and astronomy, containing the United Kingdom's largest planetarium.
- Space Park Leicester – a world-leading, pioneering £100 million research, innovation and teaching hub for space-related high-tech companies and researchers focussing primarily on research, development and applications of space.
- The National Centre for Earth Observation (NCEO) - part of the Natural Environment Research Council (NERC) and looks at improving knowledge of the planet by taking Earth observations from space and aircraft, as well as from the ground to produce models which will help understand, respond and adapt to climate and environmental changes.
- Abbey Pumping Station – a science and technology museum.
- Abbey Park – Leicester’s premier park in which the River Soar runs through.
- The Peepul Centre – a multi-use facility housing an auditorium, bar and restaurant, gym and spa, a dance studio, a day nursery, a cyber café and also being used for conferences, weddings and celebrations and corporate events, as well as for health services, including a mental health café.
- Leicester Outdoor Pursuits Centre – a sports facility aside the River Soar.

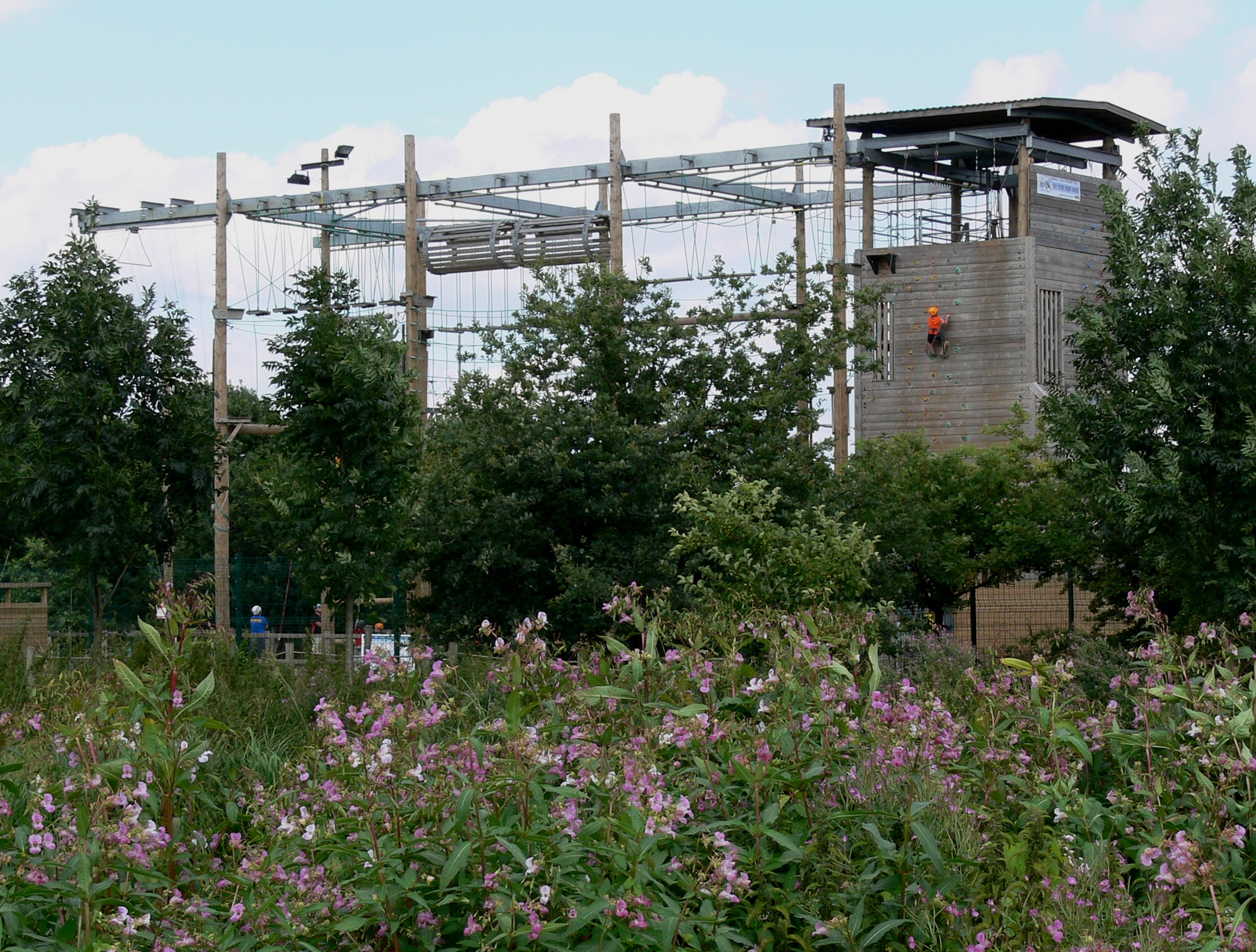
Leicester Outdoor Pursuits Centre Climbing Tower

- Cossington Street Swimming Baths and Sports Centre - a swimming pool, sauna and gym.

== In popular culture ==
Belgrave Hall became famous across the world when two ghostly figures were recorded on security cameras outside the Hall. The Hall and Gardens have since been featured in various media.

Filming of Jadoo took place in and around Belgrave.

Back in Business, a comedy starring Martin Kemp, Denis Waterman and Chris Barrie about a heist involving a Moon buggy was partly filmed at the National Space Centre in 2005, with the movie released in 2007. In 2013 scenes from the Indian film Yamla Pagla Deewana 2 were also filmed at the National Space Centre. On 2 October 2012 the National Space Centre became the venue for the BBC TV show Don’t Tell the Bride, which was aired as Episode 8 of Season 6. On 26 February 2015 the Galleries of the National Space Centre were taken over by Public Service Broadcasting, as the musical duo launched their new album The Race for Space.

Paddy’s Marten Inn, a popular Indian Restaurant in Belgrave was showcased on Jamie Oliver’s TV Show ‘Jamie’s Great Britain’ on Channel 4.

== Scenery ==
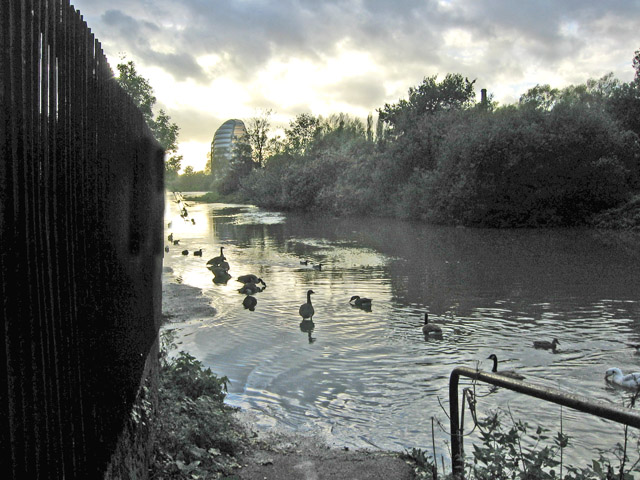
The River Soar in Belgrave with the National Space Centre in the background

The River Soar runs along the west of Belgrave from Abbey Park to Watermead Country Park and passing the National Space Centre.

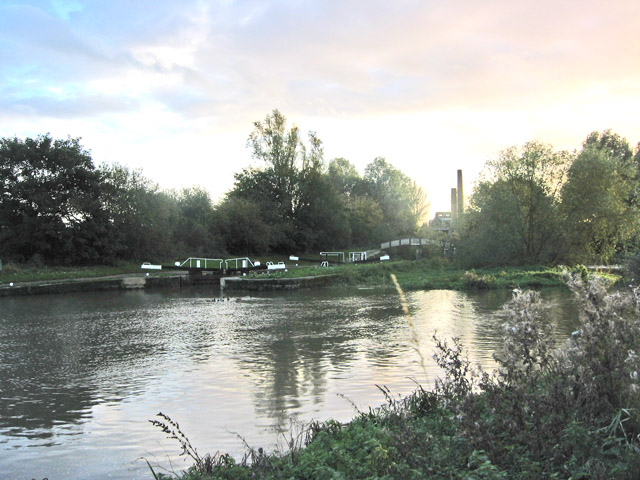
The River Soar at Belgrave Lock

== Organisations ==
- Belgrave Heritage Trust - a registered trust committed to the history of Belgrave.
- Belgrave Hall Conservation Area Society.
- Belgrave Neighbourhood Co-operative Housing Association - the largest fully-mutual co-operative housing association in the country.
- Belgrave Business Association - an organisation that represents businesses on Belgrave's Golden Mile, advocating for their interests and community development.
- Royal Anglian Regiment - Army Reserve Centre.
- TS Tiger - Sea Cadets.

== Transport ==
=== Major roads ===
Belgrave is located on, at the start of and at the south end of the A607 and is also on the A6 and the A563.

=== Bus ===
First Leicester service 4 (formerly 22) and 21 serve Belgrave on the A607 Belgrave Road and Melton Road and on Catherine Street respectively.

First Leicester services 25 and 26 travel along Belgrave Gate with service 25 going through the Old Village and service 26 going by Abbey Park and by the Old Village.

Arriva Midlands services 5, 5A and 6 all serve the A607 whilst Arriva Midlands service 127 serves the A6 Loughborough Road, travelling by the Old Village.

All bus services operate along or by the Golden Mile from and into Leicester City Centre.

The nearest bus stations, both in Leicester City Centre are the Haymarket and St Margaret's.

=== Train ===
The nearest train station is Leicester railway station.

The Midland Main Line runs along at the east of Belgrave.

Leicester Belgrave Road railway station and Belgrave and Birstall railway station are both now closed.

=== Airport ===
The nearest airport is East Midlands Airport, in Leicestershire and 19.2 miles away from Belgrave.

== Politics ==
Belgrave is located within the Leicester East parliament constituency, a seat currently held by the Conservative Party since 2024. The Labour Party consistently held the seat between 1987 and 2024 but lost the seat to the outgoing Conservative Government despite a landslide victory across the country for the Labour Party in that particular election.

The Belgrave electoral ward is currently, since 2023 represented on Leicester City Council by three Conservative Party Councillors.

The electoral ward of neighbouring Rushey Mead includes a part of Belgrave, meaning that despite the actual geographical location, that specific area may also be classed as being in Rushey Mead by virtue of the electoral ward mapping.

Former Councillors for Belgrave include Manjula Sood, Britain's First Asian Woman Lord Mayor.

Belgrave was represented within the East Midlands parliamentary constituency in the European Parliament.

== Council election results ==
=== Belgrave 2023 ===
Belgrave
Party	Candidate	Votes	%	±%
Conservative	Yogesh Chauhan	4,424	54.6	
Conservative	Shital Adatia	4,409	54.4	
Conservative	Jaiantilal Gopal	4,335	53.5	
Labour	Gurinder Kaur Athwal	1,818	22.4	
Labour	Kirit Mistry	1,759	21.7	
Labour	Hersh Thaker	1,636	20.2	
Independent	Nita Solanki	1,356	16.7	
Independent	Padmini Chamund	1,296	16.0	
Independent	Mahendra Valand	1,103	13.6	
Green	Darren Howes	341	4.2	
Liberal Democrats	Pravin Raja	239	3.0	
TUSC	David Howard Rollins	183	2.3	
Turnout		8,098	56.4	
Registered electors		14,360		
Conservative gain from Labour				
Conservative gain from Labour				
Conservative gain from Labour				

=== Belgrave 2019 ===
Belgrave
Party	Candidate	Votes	%	±%
Labour	Padmini Chamund	5872		
Labour	Nita Solanki	5383		
Labour	Mahendra Mohanbhai Valand	4707		
Conservative	Ramesh Pamsi Bhulabhai	1205		
Conservative	Devi Prakashveer Singh	951		
Conservative	Jagtar Singh	842		
Green	Mags Lewis	497		
Independent	Sanjay Prem Gogia	324		
Liberal Democrats	Asit Sodha	293		
Independent	Khandubhai Vanmalibhai Patel	211		
Majority				
Turnout				

=== Belgrave 2015 ===
Belgrave
Party	Candidate	Votes	%	±%
Labour	Mansukhlal Dharamshi Chohan	15,555		
Labour	Manjula Sood	5,593		
Labour	John William Thomas	4,653		
Conservative	Assoc Faquir	1509		
Conservative	Sathish Maroju	1485		
Conservative	Manish Naresh Teli	1273		
Green	Dinah Gilian Freer	466		
UKIP	Darren Millward	318		
UKIP	Donna Millward	270		
UKIP	Scott Prendergast	263		
LICC	Alexander Morgan	199		
Majority				
Turnout		21734	67.7	
Labour hold		Swing		

== Sport ==
Belgrave Road Cycle and Cricket Ground on Belgrave Road was a sports ground which hosted early matches of Leicester Fosse, who re-formed as Leicester City, as well as Leicester Tigers. The ground was opened on 5 May 1880 by Edwyn Sherard Burnaby, the MP for Leicestershire North as a 10-acre site with mile long running and cycling tracks, cricket and football pitches and hosted Leicester Tigers’ first official game against Moseley on 23 October of that year. The Tigers moved from Belgrave in January 1881 before moving back for the 1882/83 season. Leicester Fosse, a forerunner of Leicester City played soccer at the ground for the 1887/88 season, their fourth, however only lasted one season before their outbidding for use of the ground by Leicester Tigers. In June 1881 it also hosted Leicestershire County Cricket Club against an All England XI. It closed in 1901 when houses, shops and part of the British United Shoe Machinery were built on the site.

== Notable people ==
- John Ellis - MP for Leicester, businessman, Chairman of Midland Railway, noted liberal reformer and Quaker and a former owner and resident, along with his family of Belgrave Hall.
- Jennie Fletcher – competitive swimmer, Olympic gold medallist and former world record holder – born in Belgrave.
- Chris Pyatt - professional boxer, former world middleweight champion, Commonwealth Games gold medallist and ABA welterweight champion - fought out of Belgrave ABC.
- Tony Sibson – professional boxer, former European and Commonwealth middleweight champion and three-time world title challenger – lived in and went to primary school in Belgrave.
- Bert Harris - professional racing cyclist and champion - lived on Portsmouth Road in Belgrave.
- David Weston – artist and author – born in Belgrave.
- Tom Sidwell – cricketer – born in Belgrave.
- George Walton – cricketer – born and died in Belgrave.

== Bibliography ==
- THE STORY OF BELGRAVE The life and death of a Leicestershire village & BYGONE BELGRAVE IN 120 PHOTOGRAPHS. 2012. ISBN 978-0-9571915-1-8.
- HAUNTED LEICESTER. 2005. ISBN 0-7524-3746-1.
