= George Walton (disambiguation) =

George Walton (1749–1804) was an American politician who signed the United States Declaration of Independence.

George Walton may also refer to:

- George Walton (1615–1686), proprietor of Walton's Tavern, scene of early American witchcraft, in New Castle, New Hampshire
- George Walton (Manitoba politician) (1854–1925), politician in Manitoba, Canada
- George Walton (Royal Navy officer) (1664/5–1739), British Royal Navy admiral
- George Henry Walton (1867–1933), Scottish architect and designer
- George L. Walton (1850–1941), American politician in Louisiana
- George Walton (MP), Member of Parliament (MP) for Huntingdonshire
- George Walton (cricketer) (1863–1921), English cricketer
- George Walton (footballer) (1911–?), English footballer
- George W. Walton, American Civil War recipient of the Medal of Honor
- James Allen (highwayman), (1809-1837), a criminal who used the alias George Walton
