= Golden Mile (Leicester) =

Road in Belgrave, Leicester, England

Coordinates: 52.6493°N 1.1228°W

The Golden Mile
- Belgrave Road
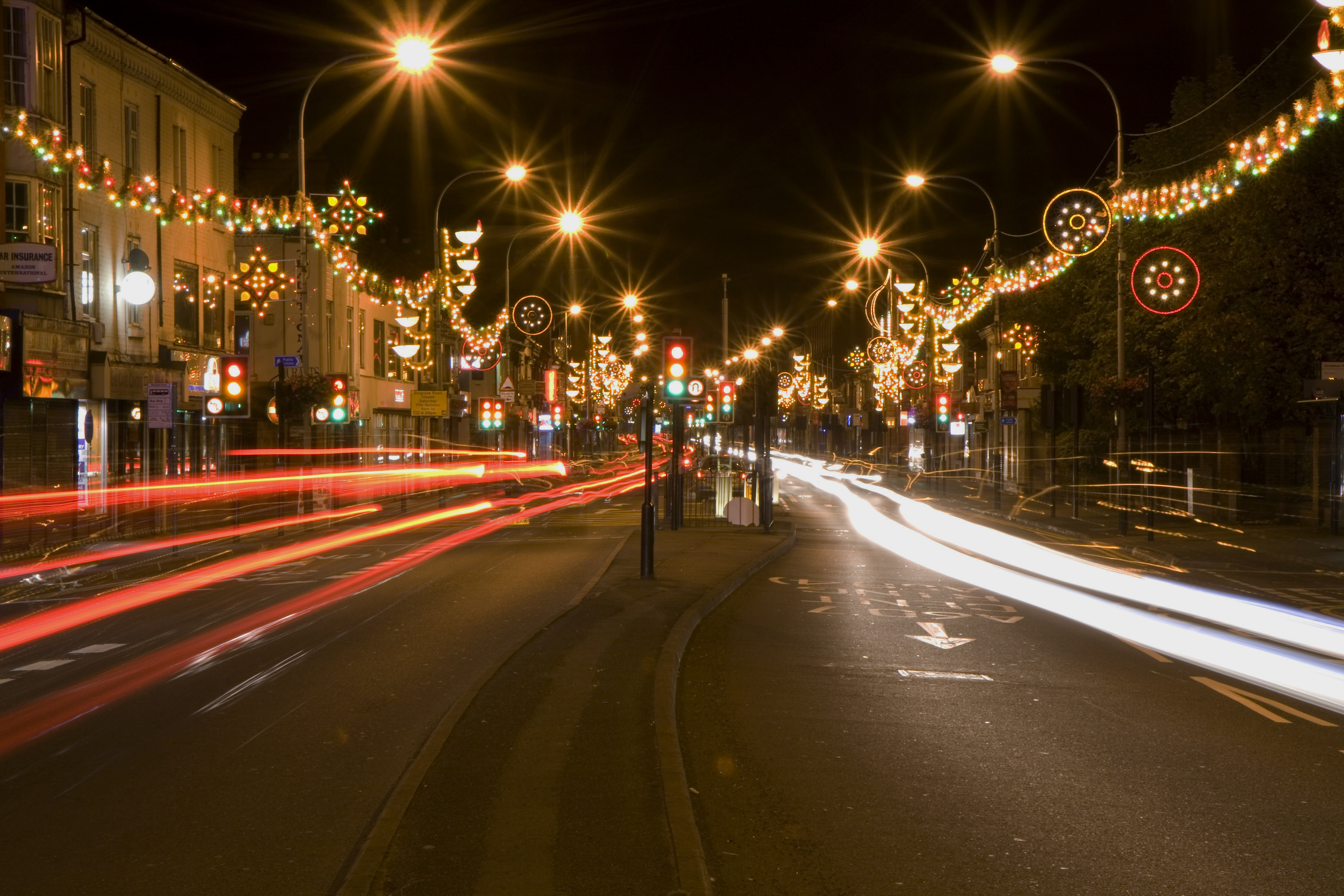
- Interactive map of The Golden Mile
- Former name: Fosse Way
- Part of: A607
- Location: Belgrave, Leicester
- Postal code: LE4 5AS & LE4 6AS (depending on exact location)
- North: Melton Road
- South: Belgrave Gate

Other
- Known for: Selling the most gold in all of Europe; Jewellers; Indian restaurants; Sari shops; Annual winter illuminations and Diwali celebrations, the largest outside of India
- Website: visitgoldenmile.co.uk

The Golden Mile is a name given to Belgrave Road, just north east of the city centre in Leicester, England. The road sells the most gold in all of Europe. It is part of the ancient Roman Fosse Way and today is famed for its jewellers, Indian restaurants, sari shops, annual winter illuminations and its internationally renowned annual Diwali celebrations, the largest of their kind outside of India.

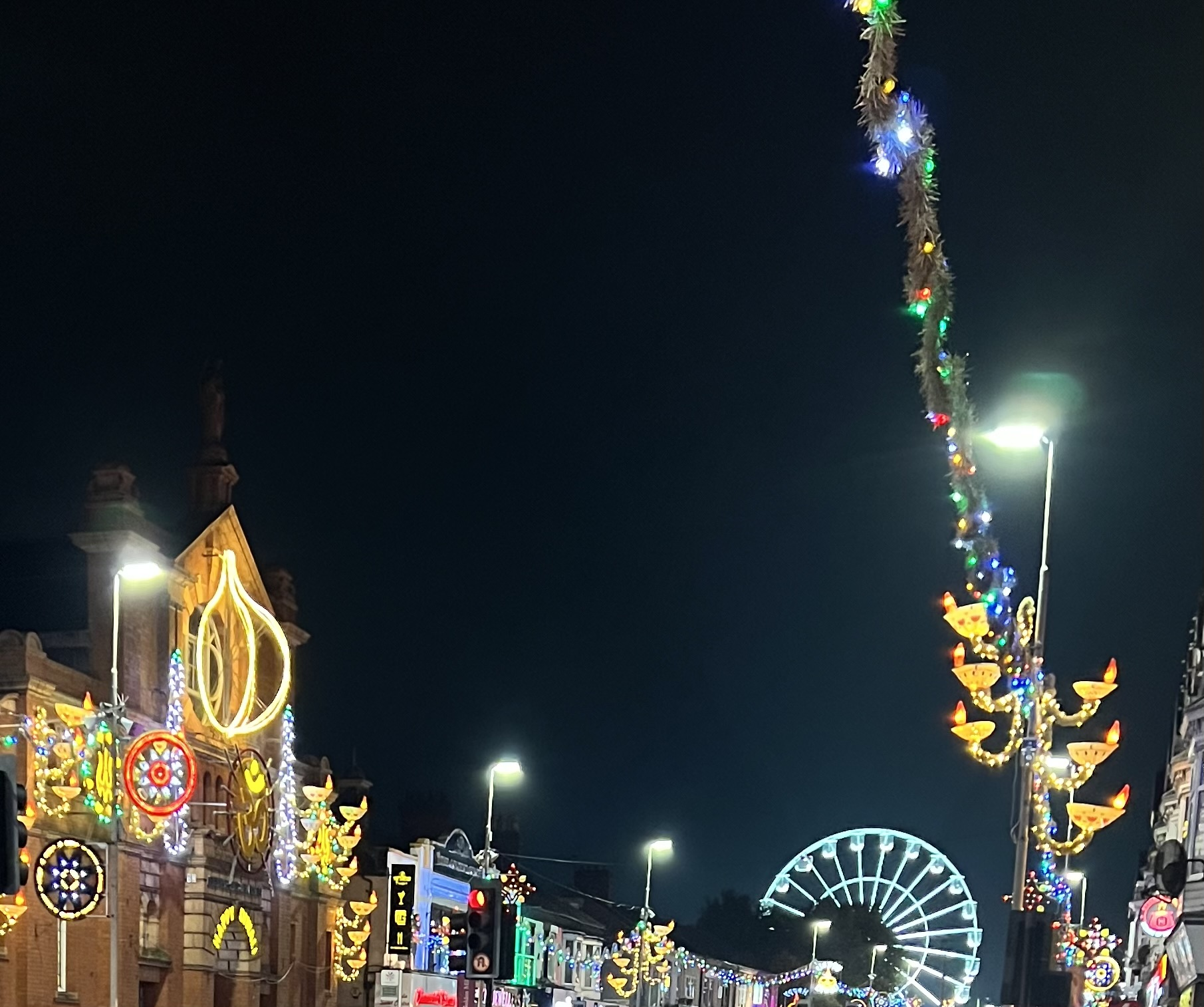

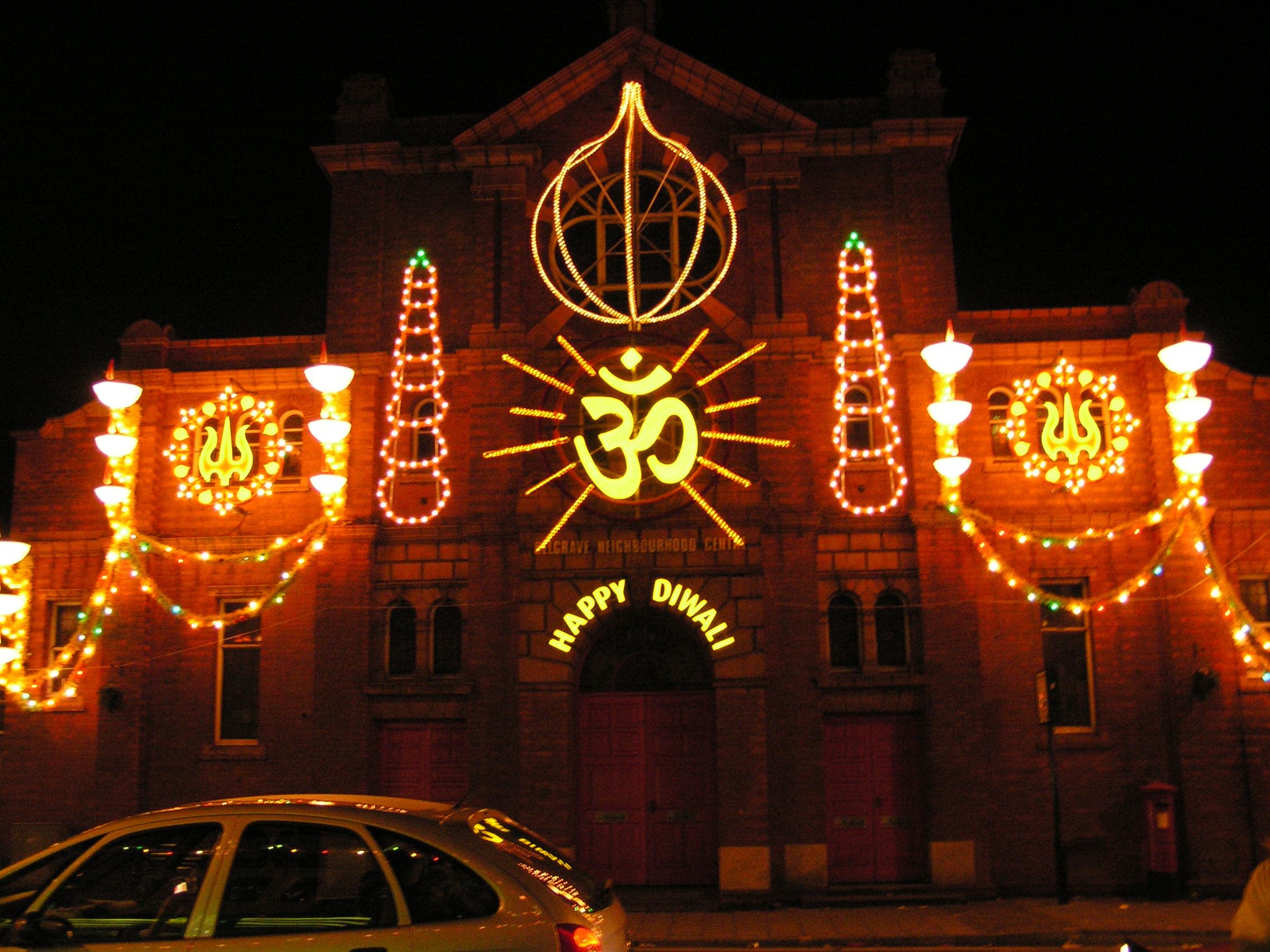

== Name ==
The origin of the name is often mistakenly attributed to the plethora of shops selling Indian gold jewellery. In fact the name originates from the late 1960s and early 1970s when a rapid succession of yellow-amber traffic lights began to appear along Belgrave Road. The name Belgrave Road is derived from the fact that Belgrave was the first village reached by the Fosse Way as it left the medieval town of Leicester.

== History ==
Originally constructed as part of the Roman road between Lincoln and Exeter, it is one of the straightest in the western Roman empire and passes through Leicester old town, becoming Narborough Road on the other side of the River Soar. It is also continuous with Fosse Way, Melton Road, Belgrave Gate, East Gates, Silver Street, Guildhall Lane and West Gates (now St Nicholas Circle), before crossing the Soar at West Bridge.

The buildings of the street were constructed during the 19th and 20th centuries and the neighbourhood became noted for its Sikh and Hindu population in the 1970s.

Leicester Belgrave Road railway station and Belgrave Road Cycle and Cricket Ground were both located here.

Bobby's, one of the first vegetarian restaurants in Britain has been on the Road since 1976.

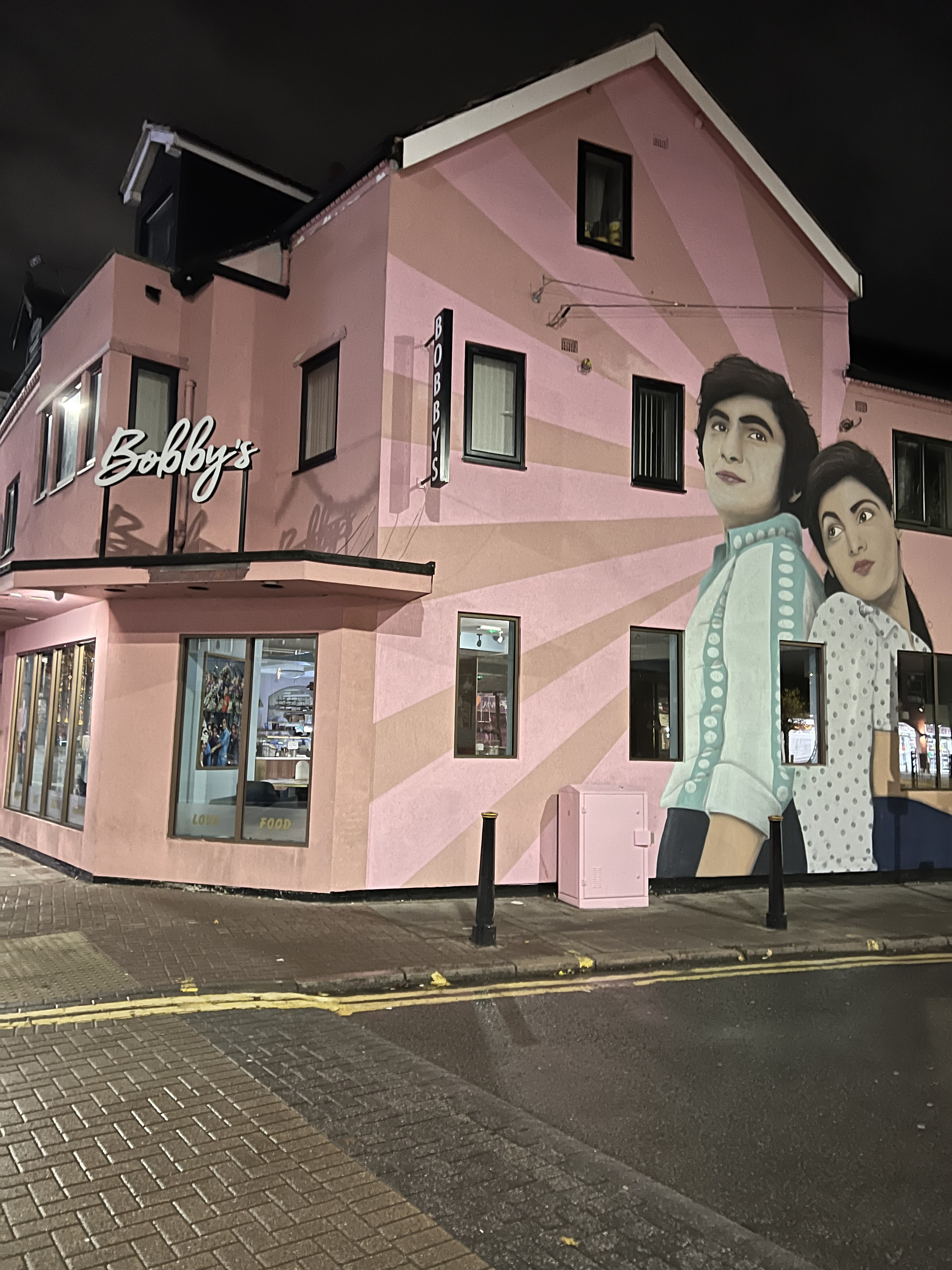

Belgrave Flyover, which connected the area with the City Centre was demolished in 2014, being replaced by Belgrave Circle Roundabout.

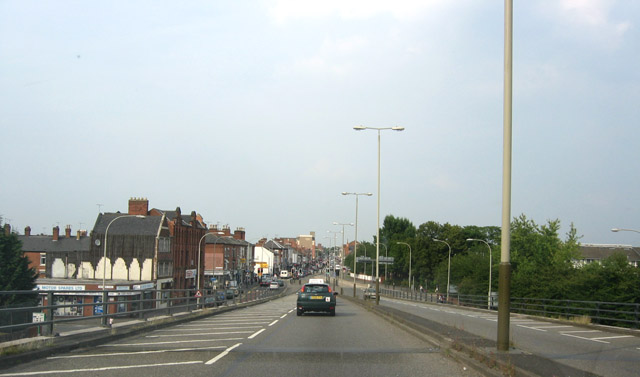
Belgrave Flyover, heading towards Belgrave and the Golden Mile from the City Centre

The 2022 Leicester unrest happened mostly on the Golden Mile.

== Today ==
The Golden Mile is renowned for its Indian restaurants, sari shops and jewellers and has been described as "the closest that Britain comes to an Indian bazaar."

The road sells the most gold in all of Europe.

This area of the city is also famous for its seasonal lights which combine to celebrate winter festivals including Diwali and Christmas. The Diwali celebrations in Leicester are focused on this area and are the largest outside of India.

Belgrave Business Association is an organisation that represents businesses on the Road, advocating for their interests and community development.

== Features ==
- Statue of Mahatma Gandhi, Golden Mile

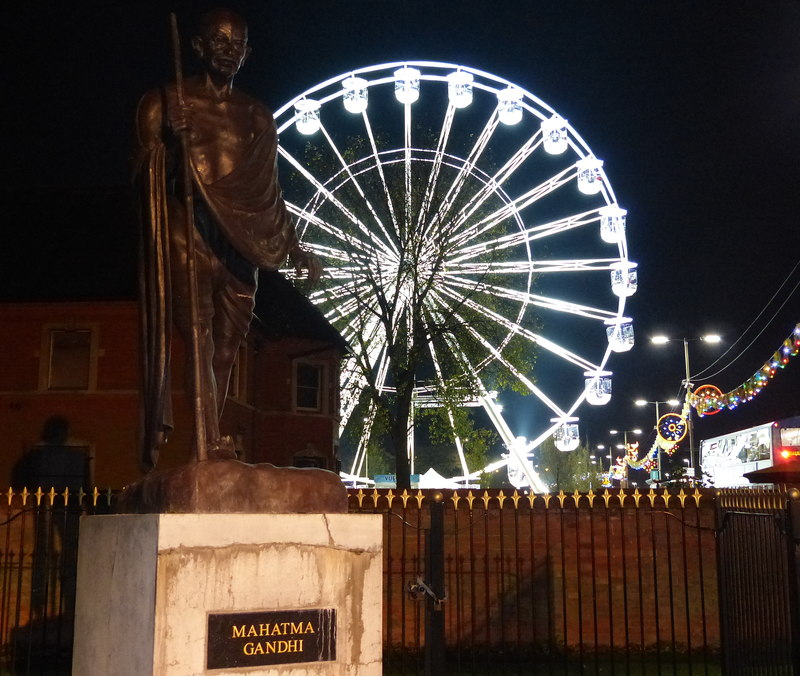

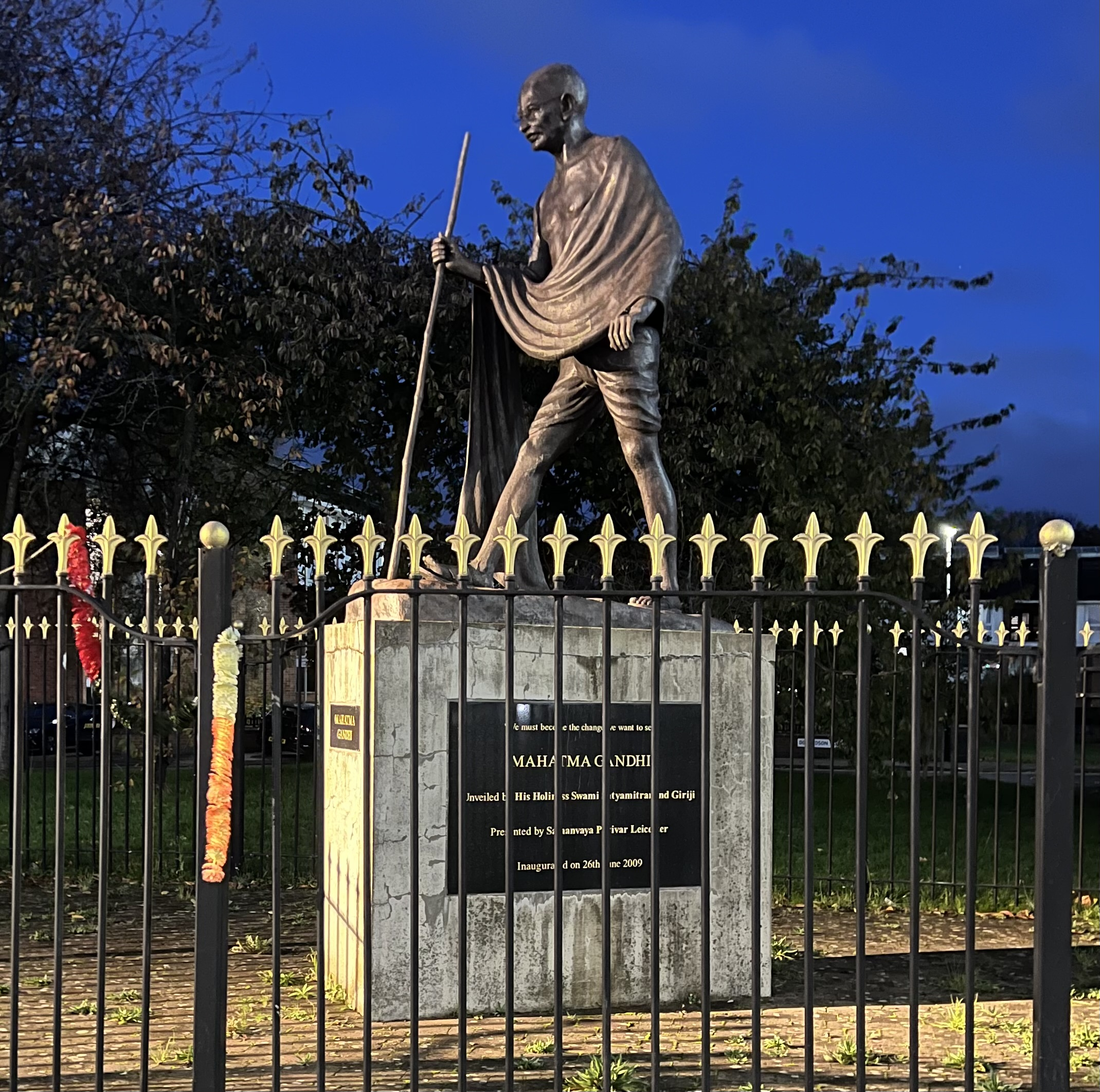

- Belgrave Circle Sculpture, at the southern end of the Golden Mile
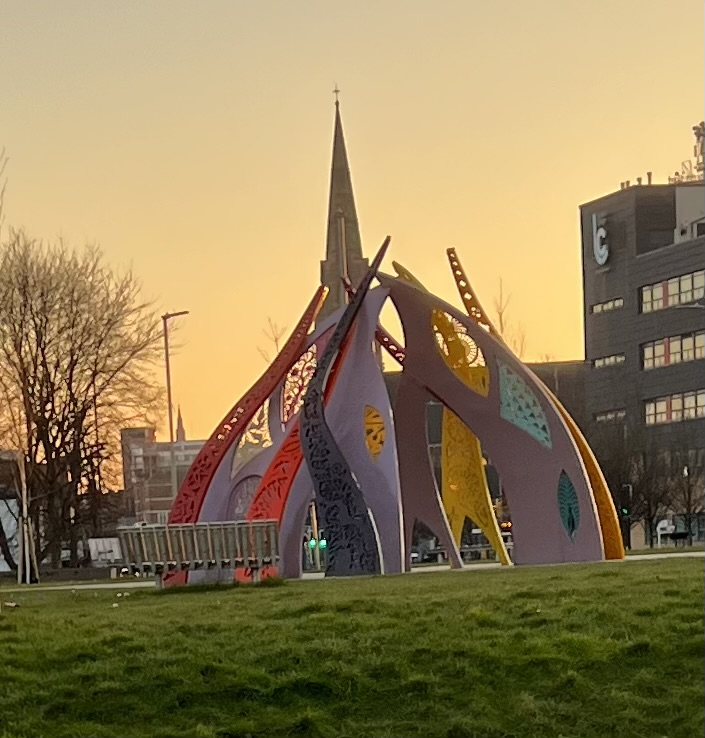

== In popular culture ==
Filming of Jadoo took place on the Golden Mile.

== See also ==
- The Curry Mile, Manchester
