= Agar Street, Belgrave =

Road in Belgrave, Leicester, England

Agar Street
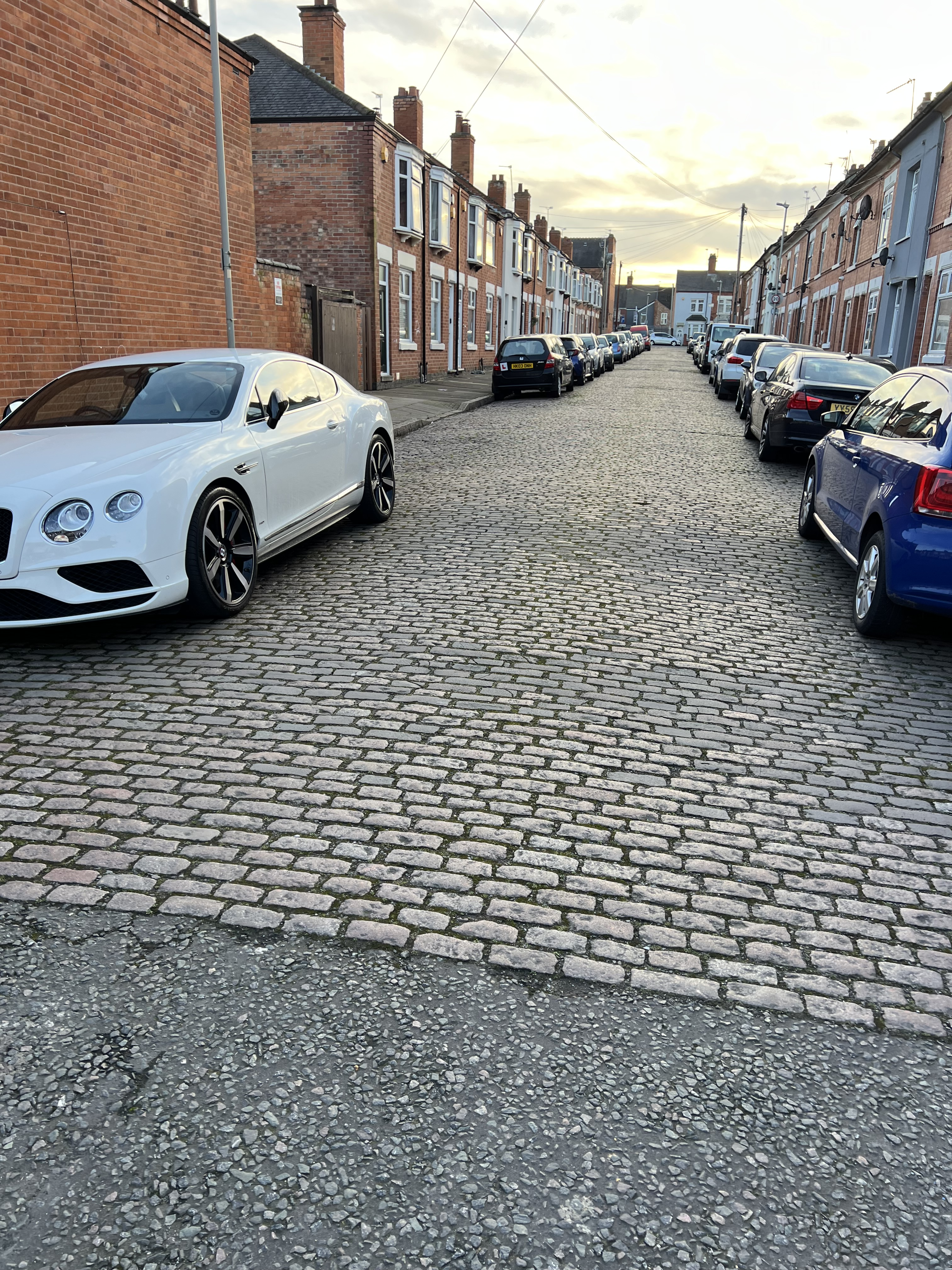
- Location: Belgrave, Leicester
- Postal code: LE4

Other
- Known for: Cobbled road

Agar Street is a residential street in Belgrave, Leicester, England known for its old-fashioned, historic cobbles. Cobbles (or "setts") are rarely used in the modern day.

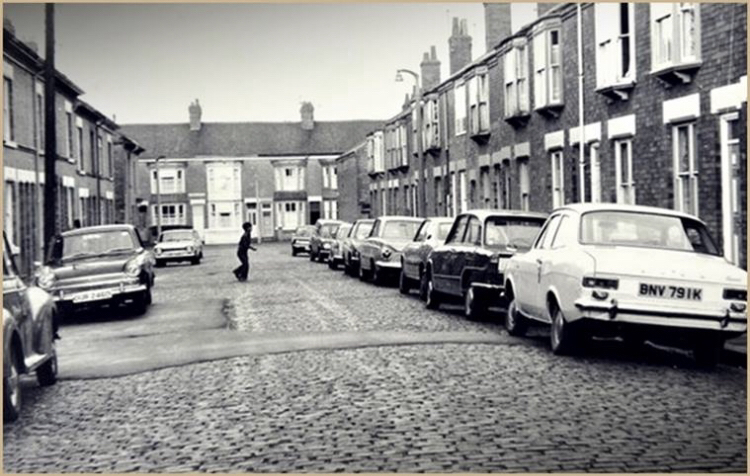
Agar Street pictured in the 1970s
