= Peepul Centre =

Building in Belgrave, Leicester, England

Coordinates: 52.645°N 1.122°W

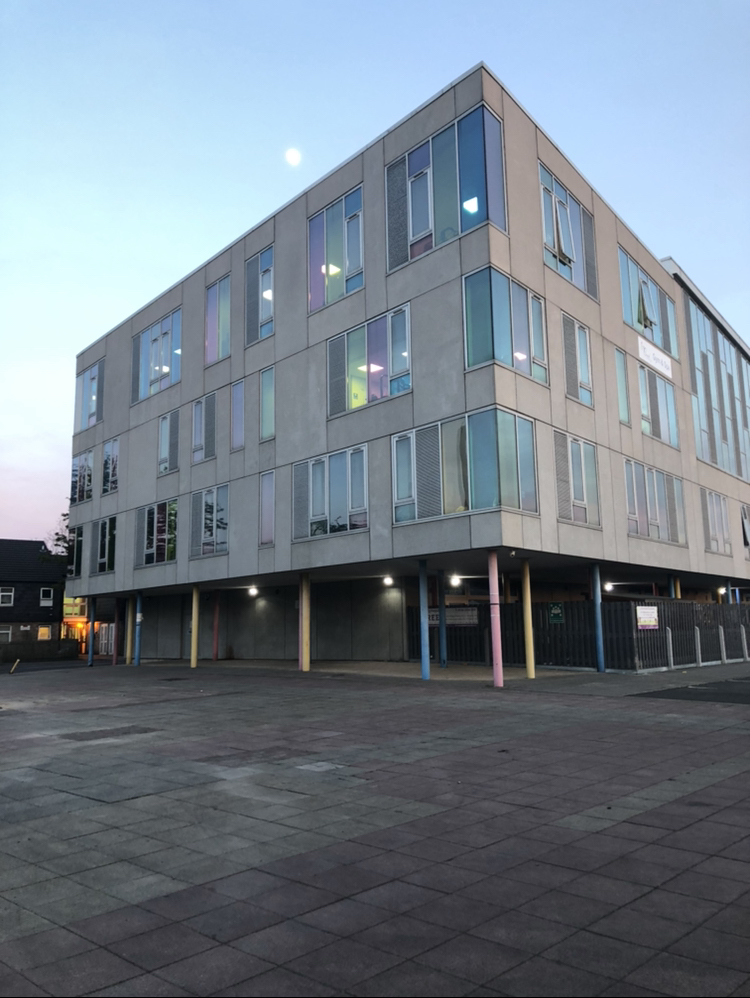
- Interactive map of the Peepul Centre area

General information
- Location: Orchadson Avenue, Belgrave, Leicester, England
- Completed: 2005

Design and construction
- Architecture firm: Andrzej Blonski Architects

The Peepul Centre is a community and arts centre and multi-purpose facility in Belgrave, Leicester. Designed by Andrzej Blonski Architects, the £15 million building was opened in 2005 and houses an auditorium/theatre, bars and restaurants, a banqueting suite, a cyber café, a gym, a spa, a sports hall, a dance studio, art spaces, a children’s day nursery, training rooms and is also used for conferences, weddings and celebrations and corporate events, as well as for health services, including a mental health café. The centre hosted Prime Minister Gordon Brown and other senior Labour Party figures during hustings for the 2007 Labour Party deputy leadership election.

Founded by the Belgrave Baheno Women's Organisation, the project was conceived in the 1990s. The centre faced financial difficulties in 2007. There are plans for expansion to include an aqua spa and a recording studio.
