= Wolsey (clothing) =

British clothing brand

- Industry: Clothing
- Founded: 1755
- Founder: Henry Wood
- Headquarters: UK
- Area served: Worldwide
- Key people: Jason Hargreaves
- Products: Mens Clothing & Accessories
- Owner: Hargreaves Family
- Website: http://www.wolsey.com

Wolsey is a heritage British clothing brand founded in 1755, making it one of the oldest existing textile companies in the world. The brand sells men's clothing and accessories, including a range of casualwear, outerwear, knitwear, shirts, trousers, denim, socks and accessories. The company has held a Royal Warrant since 1935, awarded by various Kings and Queens. Until 2017, it was based in Belgrave, Leicester, England, where it was originally established. The company name, adopted in 1920 when R Walker & Sons merged with W Tyler and Sons, is a reference to Cardinal Wolsey. 'Wolsey' is a registered trademark.

== History ==
Celebrating the 250th anniversary

The earliest records relating to the Wolsey business show that Henry Wood was trading in Leicester as a hosier in 1744. Several years later, in 1748 he went into partnership with a man named Job Middleton and they were later joined by John Wrightman in 1750.

Around 1755 Henry Wood dissolved the partnership as he wished to start his own business. Wood died in 1768 and the business was carried on by his widow and later by his sons and grandsons under the name of Ann Wood & Sons. In 1842, after the retirement of the last Wood family member the name was changed to R Walker & Sons.

In 1910 the company built a factory at Abbey Meadows in Belgrave, Leicester. In 1920 R Walker & Sons merged with W Tyler and Sons. As the business was situated near to Leicester Abbey, the burial place of Cardinal Wolsey, the business established the trading name of 'Wolsey' and as such became one of the first brand names. The company began to trade directly with retailers rather than through a wholesale network, the standard business pattern at the time. It also employed travelling salesmen to service retail accounts and advertised its products across the world.

During their race to reach the South Pole in 1911, Captain Scott and Roald Amundsen along with their teams wore Wolsey underwear. And in 1919, Wolsey underwear was also provided to Sir Ernest Shackleton for his Murmansk expedition.

In 1935 the Company was awarded its first Royal Warrant by King George V. Further Royal Warrants were awarded to the company during the reigns of Queen Elizabeth II and Queen Elizabeth, The Queen Mother. In 2024 the company received a further Royal Warrant by King Charles III.

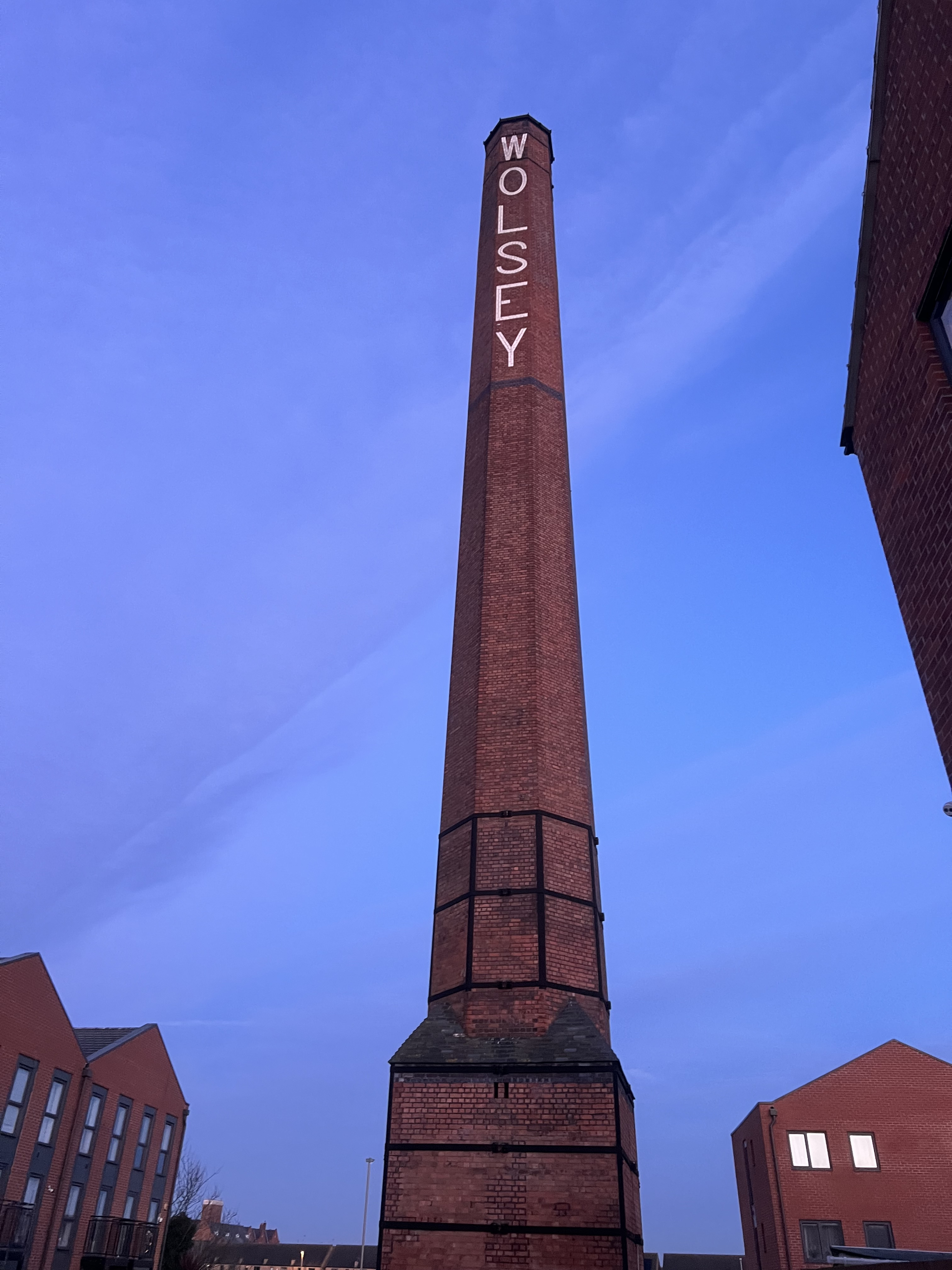
Wolsey Chimney in Belgrave, pictured in 2025

== Products ==
The company manufactures men's clothing and accessories, with product categories including shirts, overshirts, knitwear, jackets, t-shirts, denim, trousers, chinos, socks and accessories.
