= Belgrave Road Cycle and Cricket Ground =

Sports venue in Belgrave, Leicester, England

- Location: Belgrave Road; Belgrave, Leicester
- Surface: Grass

Construction
- Opened: 15 May 1880
- Closed: 1901

Tenants
- Leicester Tigers (1880–81, 1882–83, 1888–92); Leicester Fosse (1887–88)

Belgrave Road Cycle and Cricket Ground is a former sports ground which was on Belgrave Road in Belgrave, Leicester and which hosted early matches of Leicester Fosse, who re-formed as Leicester City, and Leicester Tigers. In June 1881 it also hosted Leicestershire County Cricket Club against an All England XI. The ground was situated a mile north of the town and opened in 1880. It was short-lived as a ground though and was closed in 1901 when houses, shops and part of the British United Shoe Machinery were built on the site. Now the area is bordered by Roberts Road, Buller Road and Macdonald Road.

The ground was opened on 5 May 1880 by Edwyn Sherard Burnaby, the MP for Leicestershire North as a 10-acre site with mile long running and cycling tracks, cricket and football pitches and hosted Leicester Tigers' first official game against Moseley on 23 October of that year.

The ground was enclosed which allowed a gate to be taken. However, this harmed the ability to build a following so Tigers moved to Victoria Park in January 1881. The rugby club moved back for the 1882/83 season before returning to Victoria Park. Leicester Fosse, a forerunner of Leicester City, played association football at the ground for the 1887/88 season, their fourth, however only lasted one season before being outbid for the use of the ground by Leicester Tigers. Tigers played at the ground until leaving for Welford Road in 1892.

Tigers Record

Played	Won	Drew	Lost
84	48	10	26
