= St Peter's Church, Belgrave =

Church in Belgrave, Leicestershire

Coordinates: 52°39′32″N 1°07′30″W

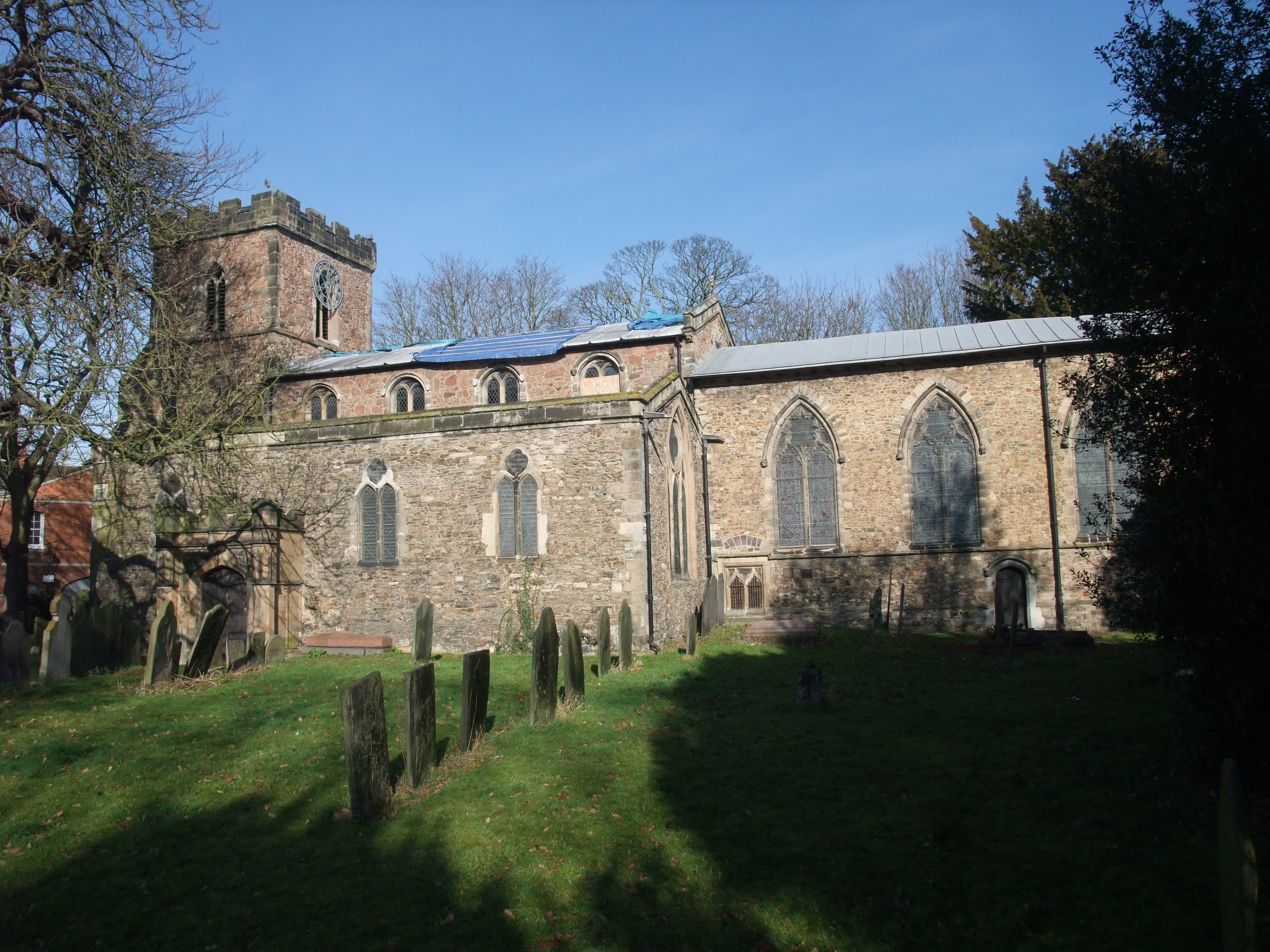
- Denomination: Church of England

History
- Dedication: St Peter

Administration
- Diocese: Leicester
- Archdeaconry: Leicester
- Parish: Belgrave, Leicestershire

St Peter's Church is a church in Belgrave, Leicestershire. It is a Grade II* listed building. It has the most magnificent Norman doorway in England.

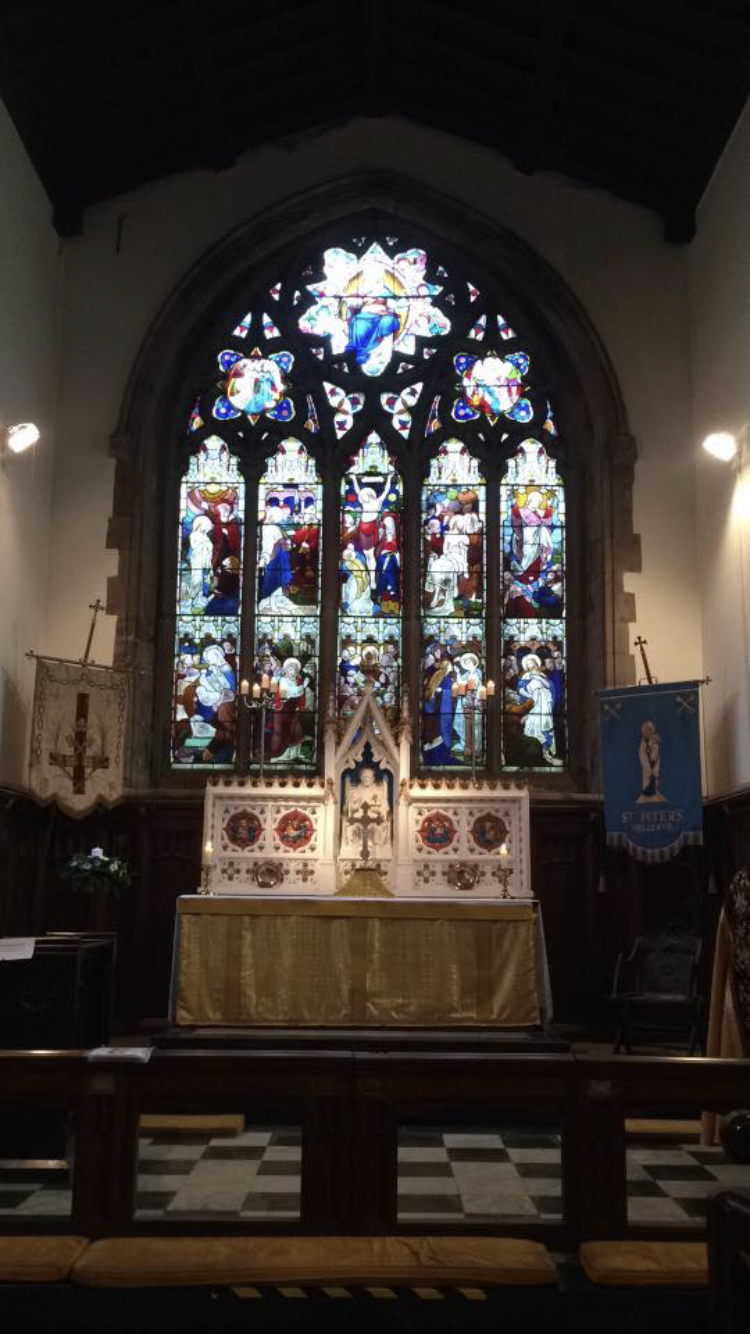

== History ==
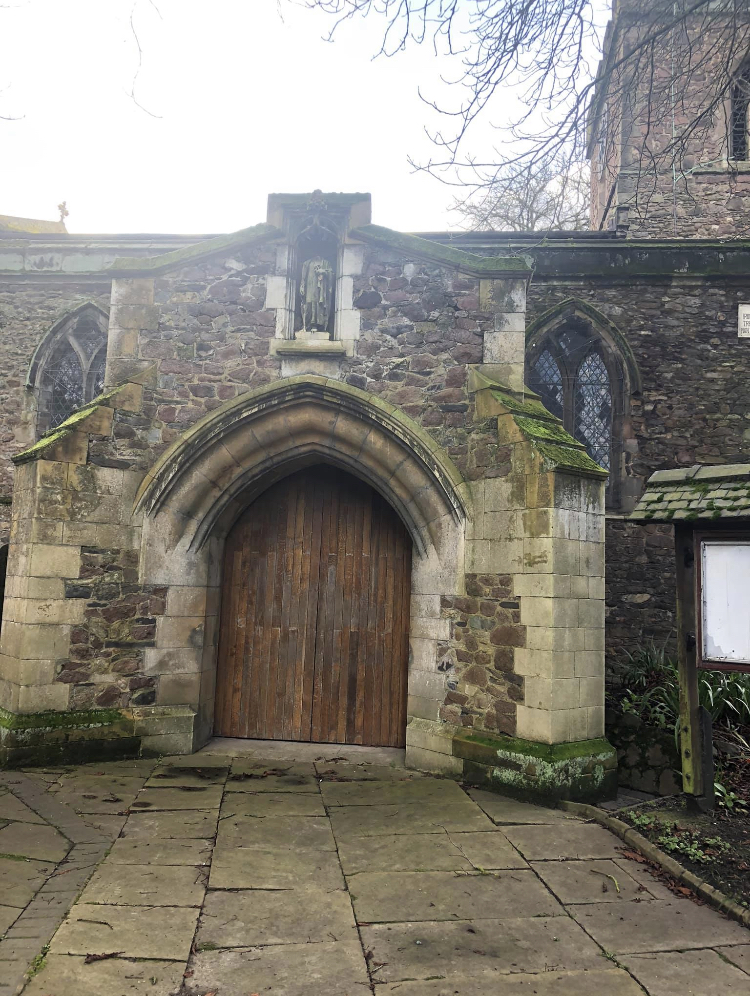
Front Porch

The church consists of a chancel, nave, south porch, vestry, tower and north and south aisles. The tower used to have a spire but this was removed in 1824. The adjacent vicarage was demolished in the late 1960s. The chancel and arcades date from the 13th century. The chancel also has 13th century windows with spikes, quatrefoils and circles, as well as a 12th-century tomb slab, sedilia and Elizabethan tablet to Ambrose Belgrave (died 1571). Archaeologists believe that there may be an earlier Saxon church beneath the present structure.

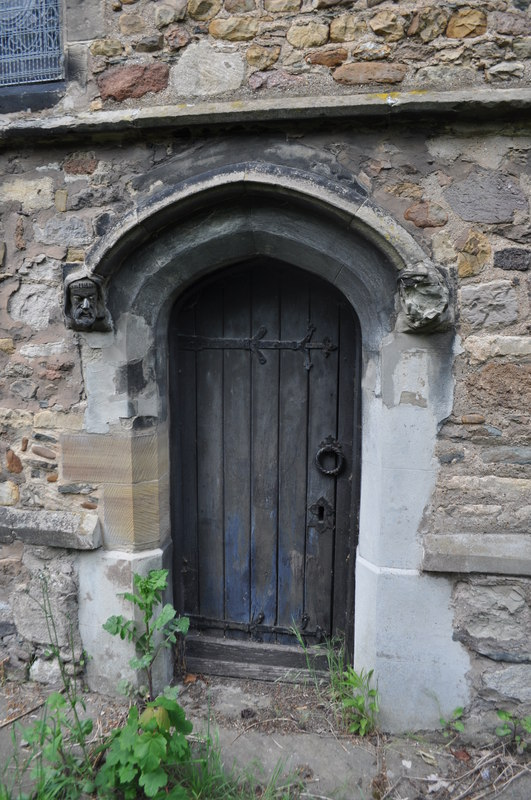
Doorway

When the English Civil War burst violently into Belgrave, records indicate that there were a number of skirmishes between the opposing forces around the Thurcaston Road Bridge and inside St Peter's Church. There is damage to the Tudor Memorial to Ambrose de Belgrave which suggests that it may have been used for target practice.

The South Porch was built in 1826.

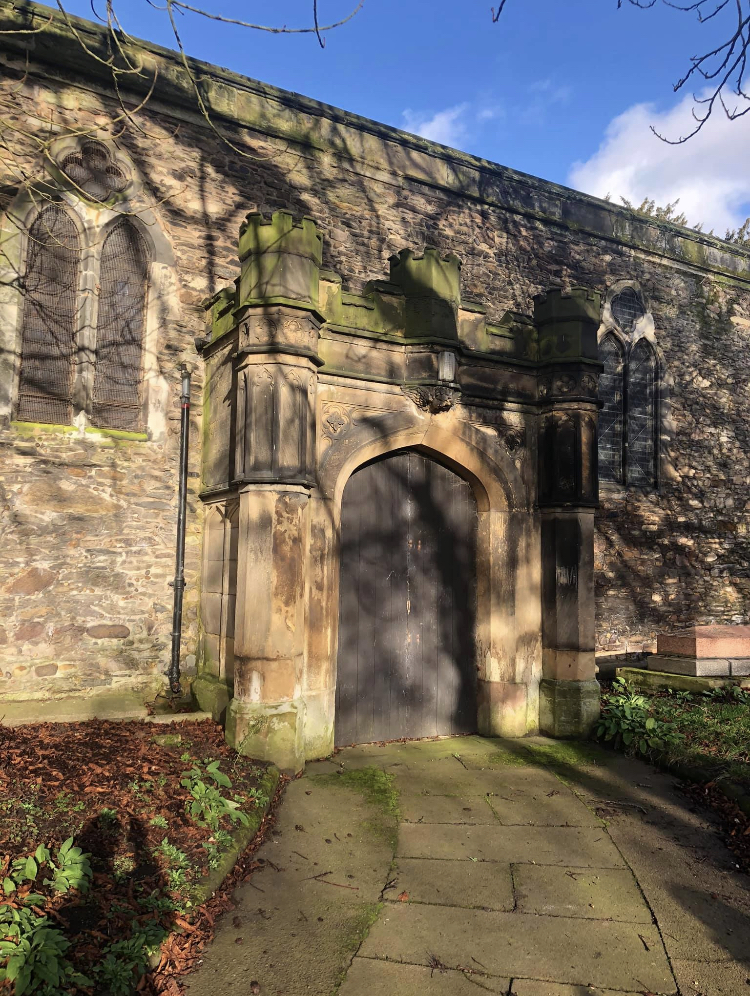
South Porch

The church was restored in 1857 and then again 3 years later by Ewan Christian. In 1861, W. Gillet restored the south aisle windows and George Gilbert Scott did some more work in 1877–78.
