= Block 35 Cobblestone Alley =

- U.S. National Register of Historic Places
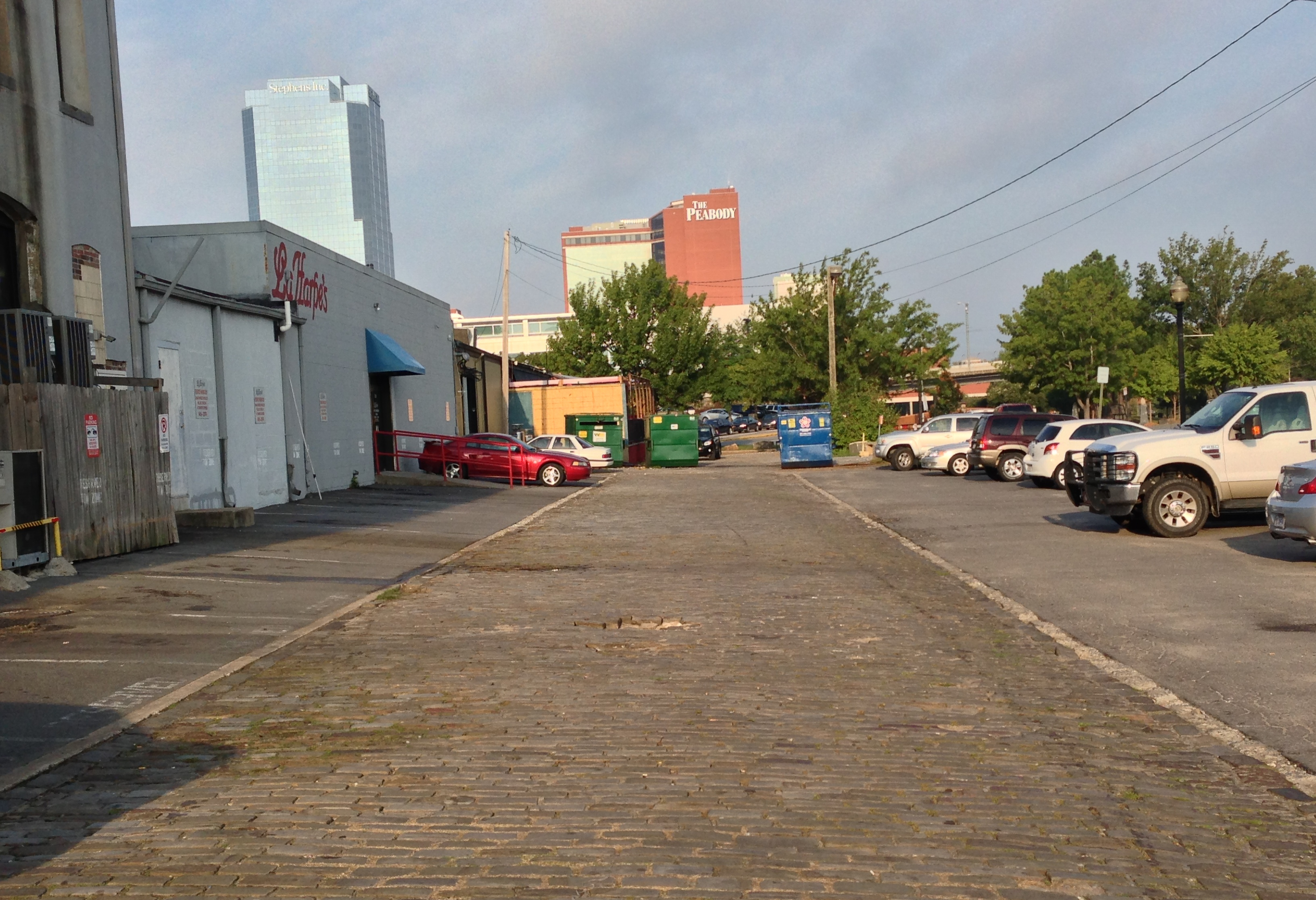

- Location within Arkansas
- Location: Little Rock, Arkansas
- Coordinates: 34°44′50″N 92°16′02″W
- Area: less than 1 acre
- Built: about 1889
- NRHP reference No.: 08001341
- Added to NRHP: January 22, 2009

Block 35 Cobblestone Alley is located in Little Rock, Arkansas. It is a 300-foot-long (91 m), 30-foot-wide (9.1 m) cobblestone alley, which bisects a city block known as Block 35 of the City of Little Rock. It was originally surfaced around 1889, and is one of the city's few surviving brick-paved alleys. It provides access to the rear of buildings facing President Clinton Boulevard. It was listed on the National Register of Historic Places in January, 2009.

It was listed as a featured property of the week in a program of the National Park Service that began in July, 2008.
