= List of cobblestone streets =

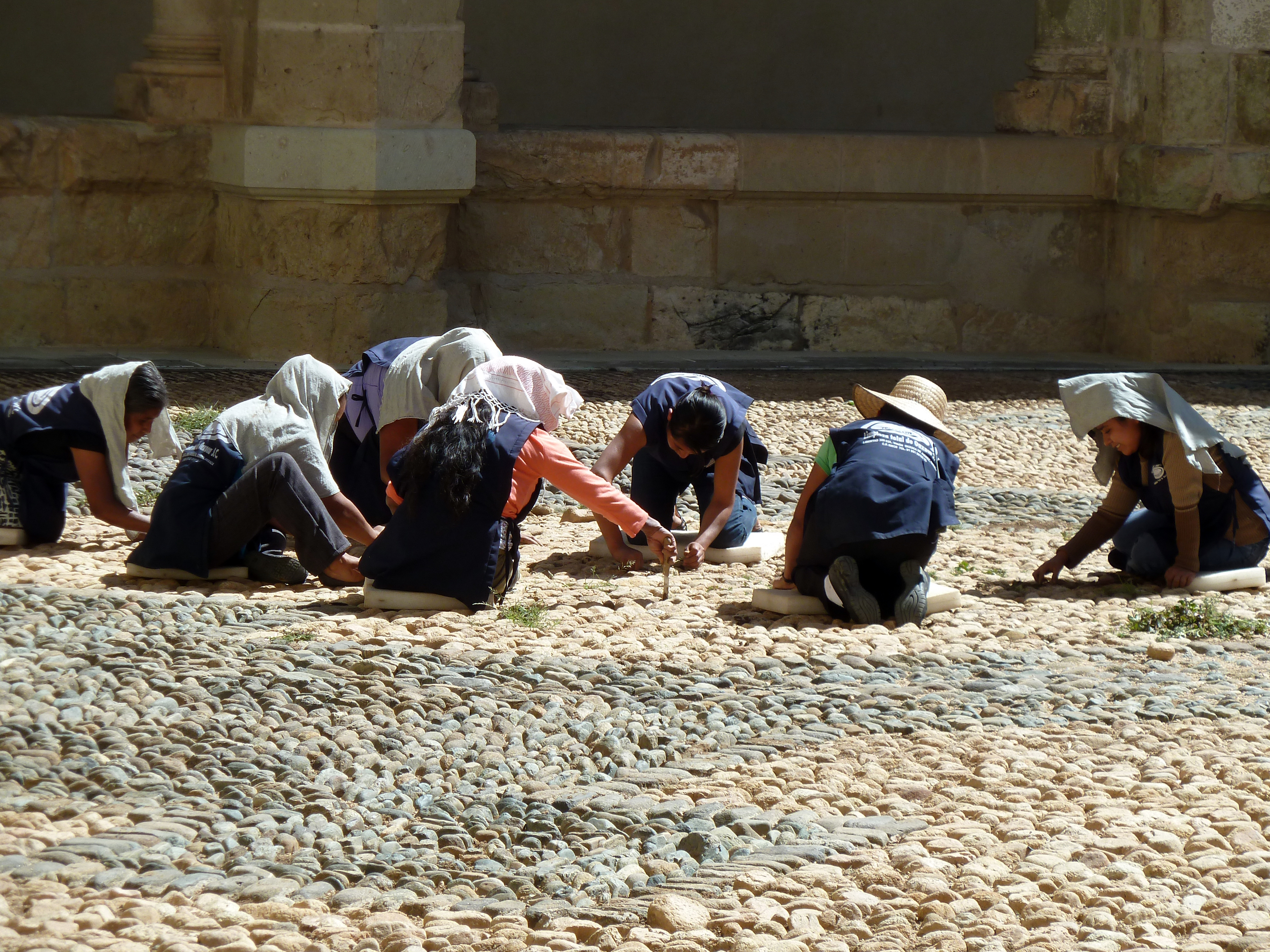
Cleaning a cobblestone street in Oaxaca. Cobblestones are natural stones, irregular in shape and size.

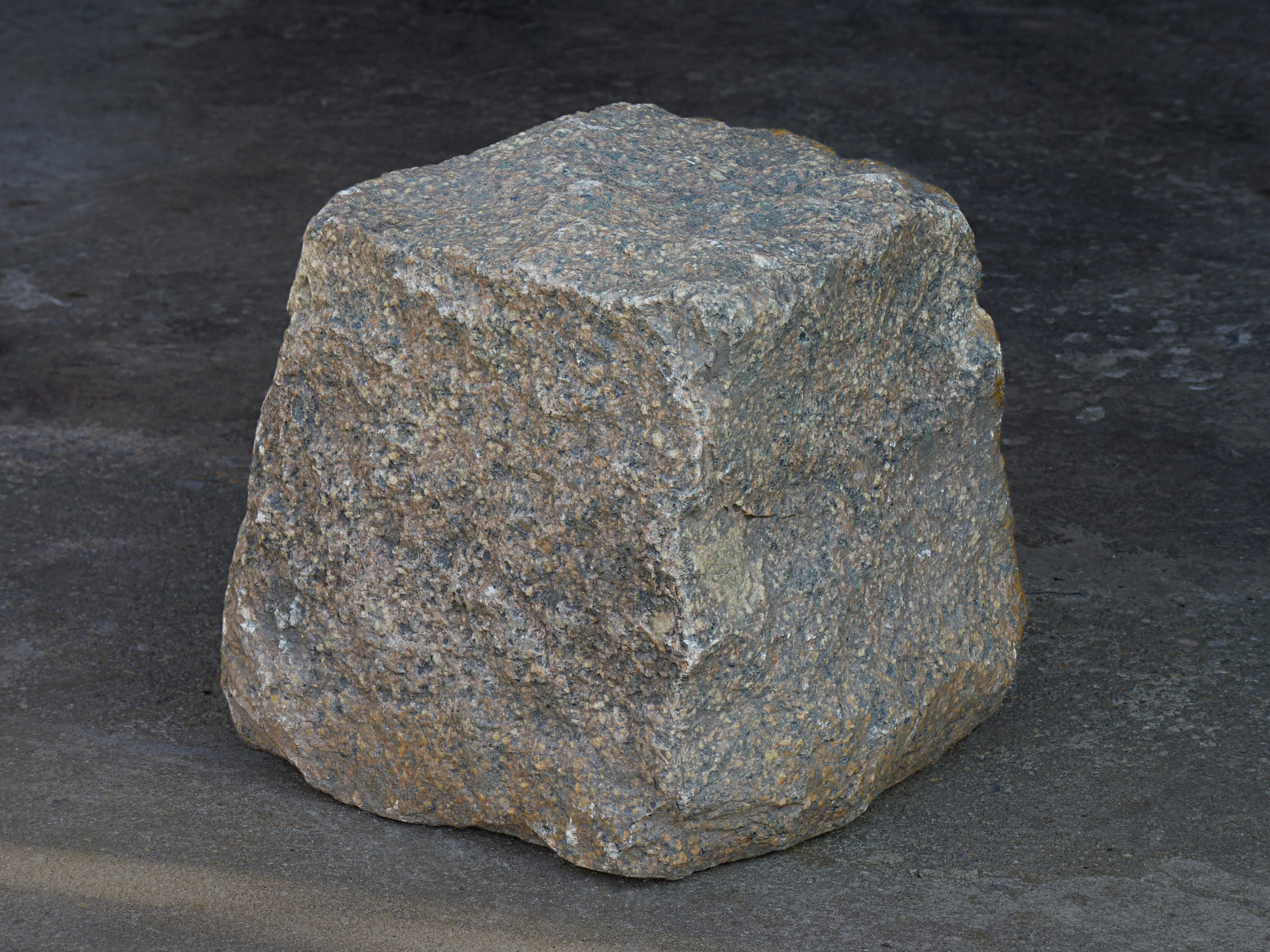
A sett block, sometimes mistakenly referred to as a cobble, but distinguished by being quarried & carved rather than naturally occurring, and being of regular size and rectangular shape.

A cobbled street or cobblestone road, is a street or road paved with cobblestones.

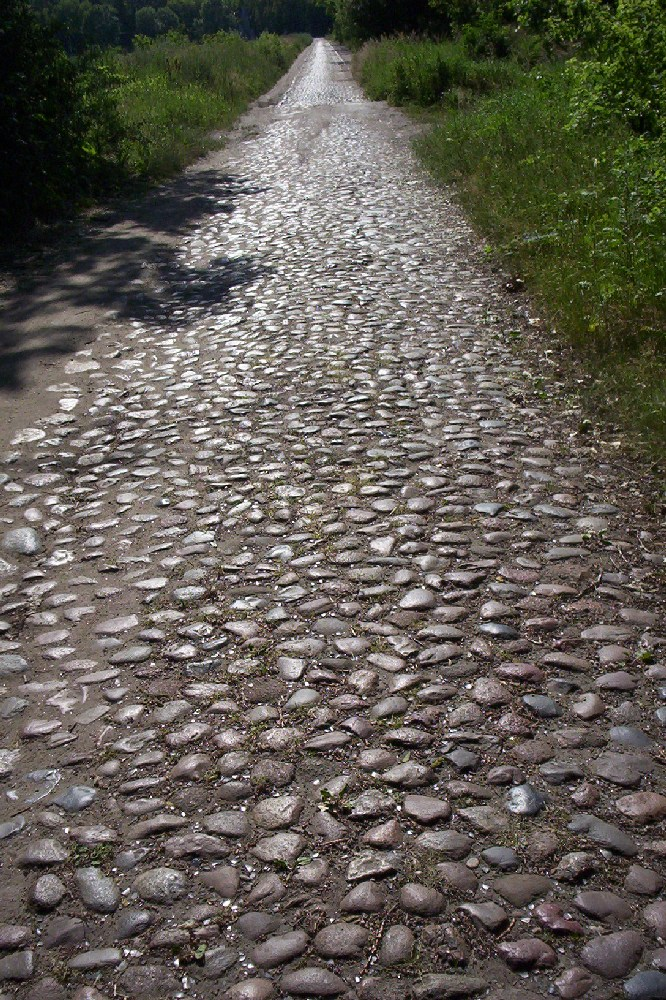
A cobbled road

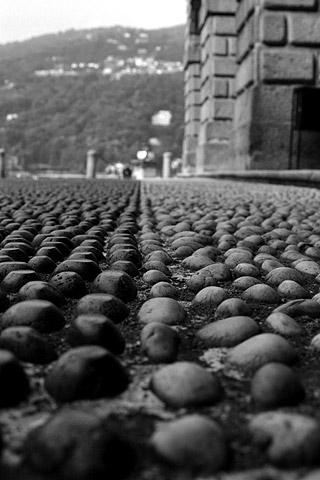
A cobbled street

There are many historic streets that are cobbled. In the United States, several of these are recognized in the National Register of Historic Places.

== List ==
The following is a list of streets and roads which are famed or notable for being paved with cobbles (natural stone), setts (cut stone), artificial pavers (i.e. concrete or brick), or similar masonry works (natural, cut, or artificial).

Street	Image	Map	Status	Coordinates	Location	Description
Belgium
Muur van Geraardsbergen			built	50.7725°N 3.89°E	Geraardsbergen, Flanders, Belgium	Frequently used in the Tour of Flanders bicycle race.
Haaghoek			built	50.4944°N 3.4238°E	Horebeke and Brakel, Belgium	1700 m of well-maintained cobbles. First half descending, second part slightly rising.
Oude Kwaremont			built	50.787°N 3.524°E	Kluisbergen, Flanders, Belgium	Uphill road. The upper 1600 m are paved with cobblestones. The first 500 m of cobbled section is the steepest and narrowest part of the climb with a very uneven cobbled surface. The final kilometer the gradient levels out from 11% to 2%.
Paddestraat			built	50.5249°N 3.2617°E	Zottegem, Belgium	2400 m of well-maintained cobbles. First 900 m slightly rising, second part almost flat.
Steenbeekdries			built	50.4818°N 3.3649°E	Maarkedal, East Flanders, Belgium	Frequently used in bicycle races such as the Tour of Flanders, Dwars door Vlaanderen, Tour of Flanders for Women.
France
Carrefour de l'Arbre			built	50.3547°N 3.1410°E	Nord, France	Frequently used as part of the Paris–Roubaix cycle race, which gives it a 5-star difficulty rating. (Note: Paris–Roubaix difficulty 1-5 stars, with 0 being no cobbles, 1 being easiest, 5 being hardest)
Trouée d'Arenberg			built	50.399°N 3.4125°E	Wallers, Nord, France	Frequently used as part of the Paris–Roubaix cycle race, which gives it a 5-star difficulty rating.
United States
Acorn Street			built 1823 within Beacon Hill, Boston Historic District; NRHP-listed		Boston, Massachusetts	
Block 35 Cobblestone Alley			built 1889; NRHP-listed		Little Rock, Arkansas	
Cobblestone Path			1785 built 1989 NRHP-listed		Bardstown, Kentucky	
Cobblestone Street			built 1832; NRHP-listed		Boonville, Missouri	
Main Street (Nantucket)			cobbled ca. 1837, Within Nantucket Historic District; NRHP-listed		Nantucket, Massachusetts	

== In India ==
Church Street in Bangalore, and several streets in the historic French 'White Town' in Pondicherry are examples of cobblestone paved streets.

== See also ==
- Cobblestone
- List of cobblestone buildings
- Cobbled classics
