= George Walton (cricketer) =

English cricketer

Personal information
- Full name: George Walton
- Born: 3 December 1863; Belgrave, Leicestershire, England
- Died: 3 June 1921 (aged 57); Belgrave, Leicestershire, England
- Batting: Right-handed
- Bowling: Right-arm fast-medium

Domestic team information
- Years: Team
- 1894–1895: Leicestershire

Career statistics
Competition	First-class
Matches	9
Runs scored	88
Batting average	6.76
100s/50s	–/–
Top score	24
Balls bowled	861
Wickets	17
Bowling average	24.94
5 wickets in innings	–
10 wickets in match	–
Best bowling	4/64
Catches/stumpings	9/–
- Source: Cricinfo, 30 January 2013

George Walton (3 December 1863 – 30 June 1921) was an English cricketer. Walton was a right-handed batsman who bowled right-arm fast-medium. He was born at Belgrave, Leicestershire.

Walton made his first-class debut for Leicestershire against the Marylebone Cricket Club in 1894 at Lord's. He made seven further first-class appearances for Leicestershire in 1894, with his final first-class appearance coming against Nottinghamshire in the 1895 County Championship. In nine matches, he scored a total of 88 runs at an average of 6.76, with a high score of 24, while with the ball he took 17 wickets at a bowling average of 24.94, with best figures of 4/64.

He died at the place of his birth on 30 June 1921.
