= George W. Walton =

American veteran (1844–1920)

George W. Walton (March 27, 1844 – February 8, 1920) was an American veteran of the American Civil War, who received the Medal of Honor for valor. The medal was awarded on 6 August 1902 for actions with the 97th Pennsylvania Infantry as a private at Fort Hell, Petersburg, Virginia, on 29 August 1864. He was born in Upper Oxford Township, Pennsylvania, and died in Oxford, Pennsylvania, where he is now buried at the Oxford Cemetery.

== Medal of Honor citation ==
For extraordinary heroism on 29 August 1864, in action at Fort Hell, Petersburg, Virginia. Private Walton went outside the trenches, under heavy fire at short range, and rescued a comrade who had been wounded and thrown out of the trench by an exploding shell.
