= Illuminations (festival) =

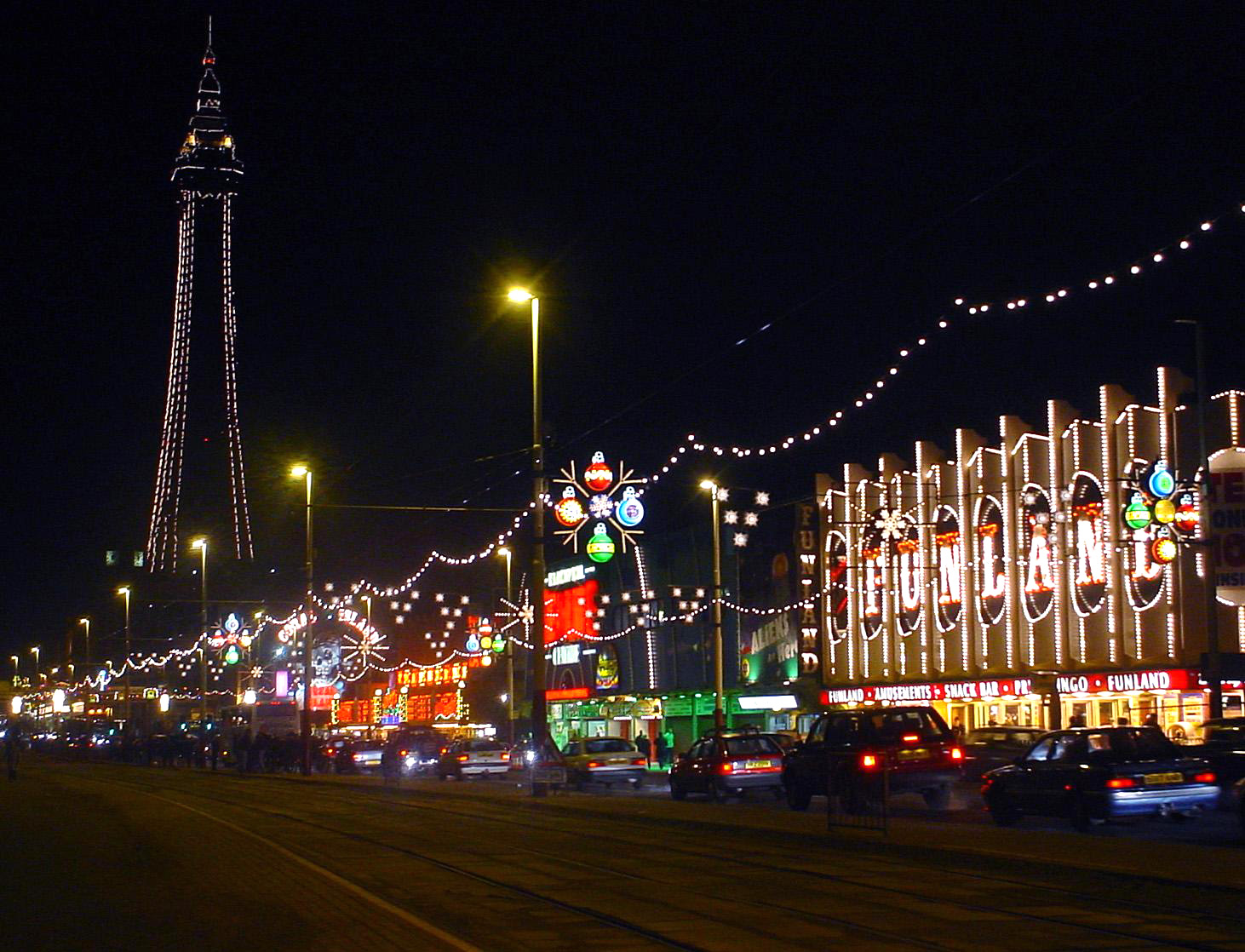
Illuminations on Blackpool promenade

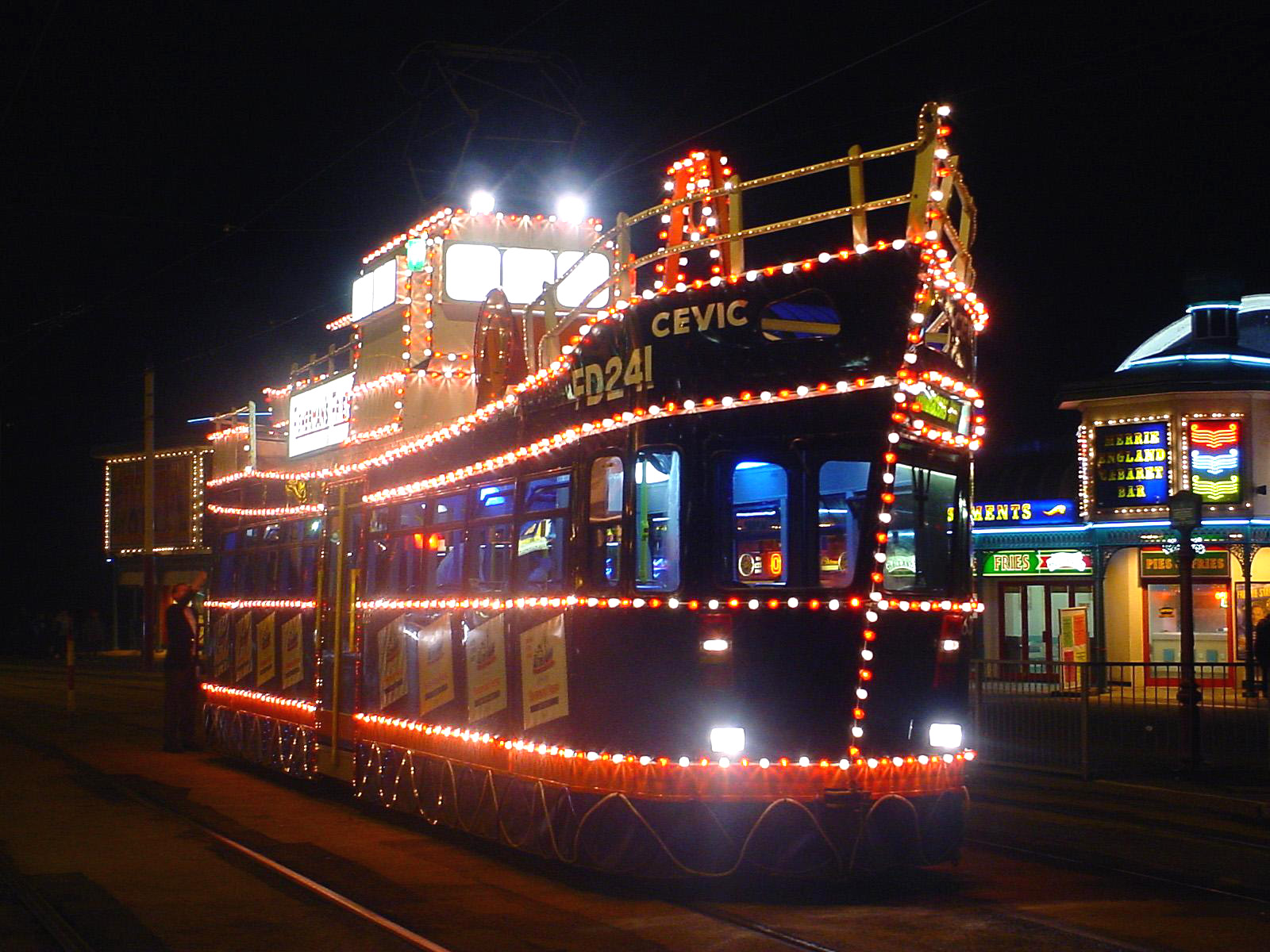
Illuminated trawler tram at Blackpool

Illuminations are secular Autumn festivals of electric light held in several English cities, towns and villages, in particular:

- Blackpool (1879–present)
- Matlock Bath (1897–present)
- Mousehole (1963–present)
- Sunderland (actually Roker and Seaburn Illuminations; 1937–1959, 1986–1990s, 2012–present).

== Blackpool Illuminations ==
Until 2019, the Blackpool Illuminations ran for 66 days each year. They switched on in late August with a star-studded 'Switch On' show and ran to early November. Since 2020 the Illuminations run until the first week of January.

At six miles (9.65 kilometres) long and using over one million bulbs, the Blackpool Illuminations are an awesome spectacle. The Blackpool Illuminations consist of a wide variety of light displays: lasers, neon, light bulbs, fibre optics, searchlights and floodlighting. There are set pieces made out of wood studded with light bulbs; the characters and objects portrayed seem to “move” by way of winking lights. Three-dimensional illuminated scenes are also popular. There are over 500 road features attached to lamp posts linked together with festoon lighting. Strings of lights along the structure of buildings pick out landmarks in luminous detail – you can always make out the Blackpool Tower and the Pleasure Beach Blackpool rides in this way.

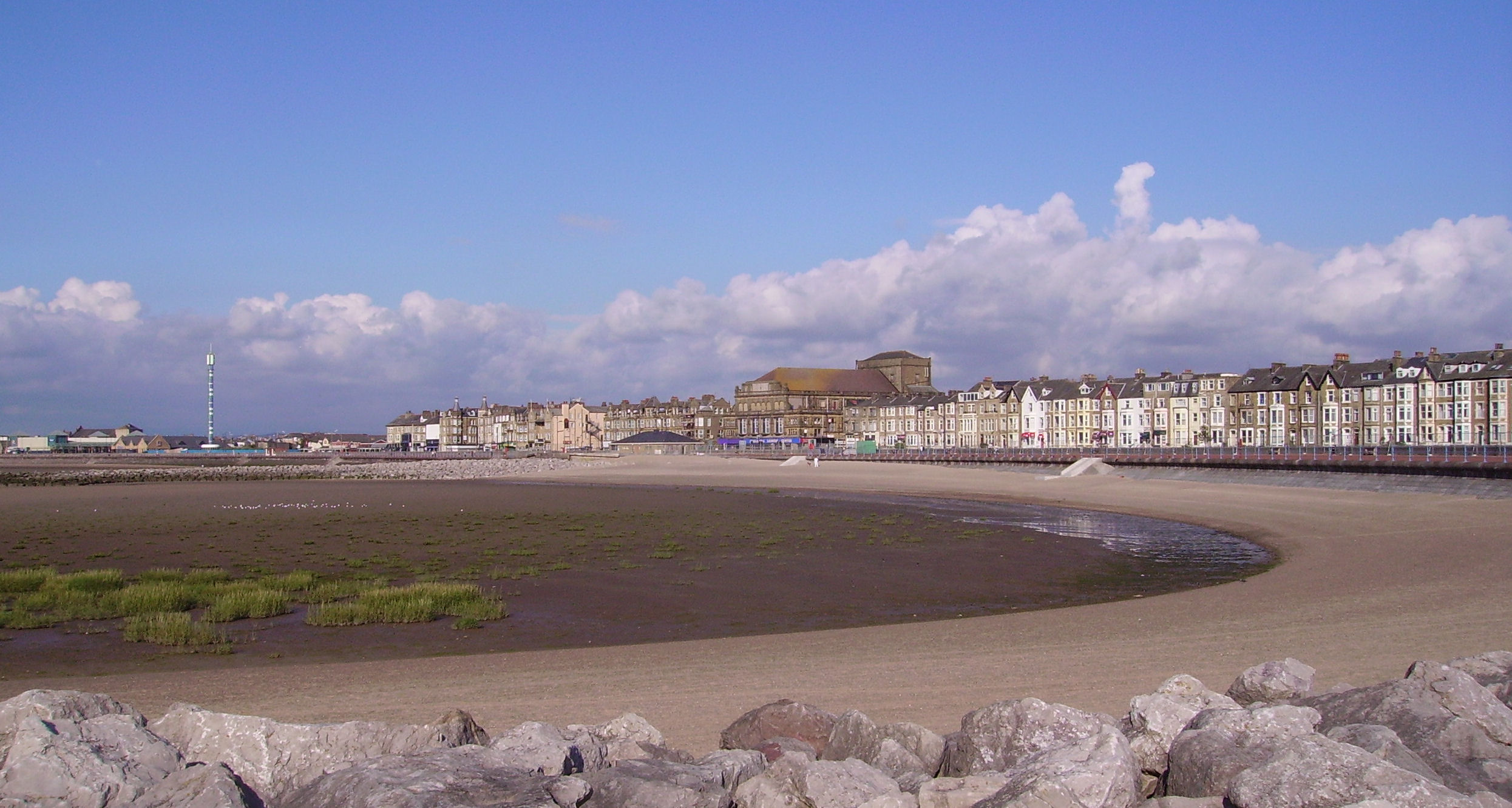
Morecambe Once Bathed in lights, attracting 100,000 at their zenith.

== Morecambe Illuminations ==
Morecambe's Illuminations once filled the promenade and gardens with a "spectacular wonderland of light" And in the resort's main park - Happy Mount Park. The lights ran from 1919 until 1996, famous faces such as Roger Moore and Noel Edmonds and even the town's most famous son and his companion, Morecambe and Wise were called upon to switch the Illuminations on for each season.

Although illuminations in there traditional way ended in 1996. Morecambe has continued to have Illumination activity.

Callum Henry who had, set up an ambitious campaign of proposals in 2015 in which to bring back the illuminations. From the ups and downs, this brought the introduction of 'Luminate' began in late 2019, which would develop multiple light displays, re-imagined throughout the area mostly involving community workshops as seen with January 2020's Expressions project over three nights along Morecambe's, coast, alongside new projects planned in an exciting programme of light festivities, bringing the idea of illuminations back to the area. Luminate reinspired the idea of Morecambe Illuminations for the 21st century. As of 2021 there are further plans for to the illuminations to return to the promenade. Councillor Charlie Edwards has been working with Lancashire County Council and Morecambe BID to ensure funding for the event.

In December 2021 new illuminations were installed along the promenade as part of a taste of what the event could offer albeit on a much larger scale.

Since then, in 2023 BayLight produced by Morecambe Sparkle began. It has been a hugely successful light festival over three nights every February half term. Combining international and national artists, in a spectacular trail down the promenade. Alongside a community parade each year. The festival has attracted upwards of 30,000 each year, and developed into an annual event within Morecambe’s calendar.

Since 2015 the idea of reimagined illuminations by Luminate in Morecambe has grown and developed with a unique illuminations offer now taking place in many different ways.

== Past ==
- Morecambe, 1919-1996
- Walsall, 1951-2008 (primitive displays since 1875)

== See also ==
- West Country Carnival
