= Ros Altmann, Baroness Altmann =

British life peer and political campaigner (born 1956)

The Right Honourable The Baroness Altmann CBE
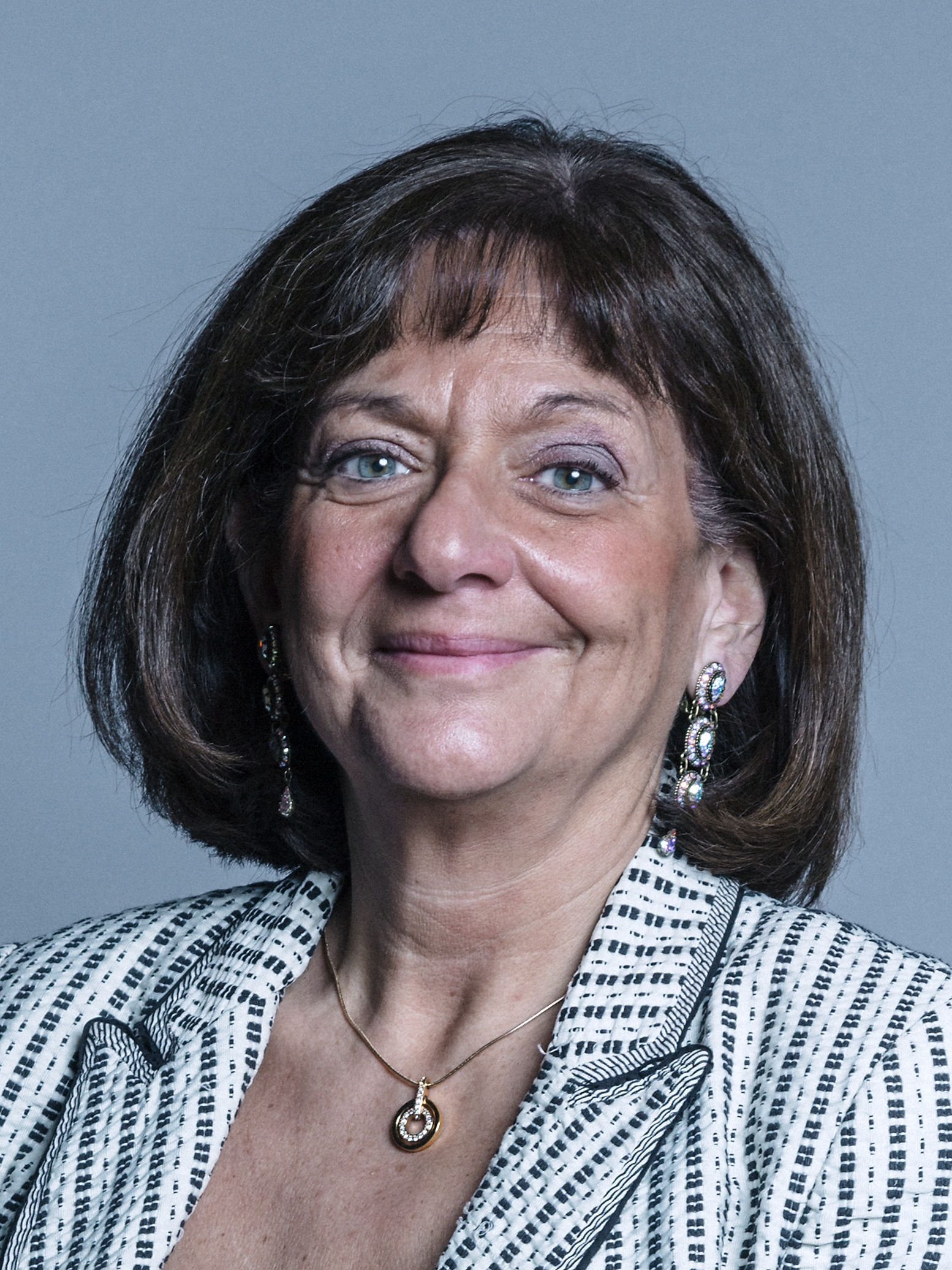
- Official portrait, 2018

Minister of State for Pensions
- In office 11 May 2015 – 15 July 2016
- Prime Minister: David Cameron; Theresa May
- Preceded by: Steve Webb
- Succeeded by: Richard Harrington

Member of the House of Lords
- Lord Temporal
- Life peerage 19 May 2015

Personal details
- Born: 8 April 1956 (age 70)
- Party: Non-affiliated (2024–)
- Other political affiliations: Conservative (2015–2024), Labour (until 2015)
- Spouse: Paul Richer
- Children: 3
- Education: University College London; Harvard University; London School of Economics

Rosalind Miriam Altmann, Baroness Altmann, CBE (born 8 April 1956) is a British life peer and political campaigner. She was appointed to the House of Lords following the 2015 general election as a Conservative, but describes her work both before and after the election as being politically independent, championing ordinary people and social justice.

She became well known in 2002 for leading the "pensionstheft" campaign on behalf of 150,000 workers and their families whose company pensions disappeared when their employers' final salary scheme failed. Having been assured their pensions were safe and protected by law, these workers from companies such as Allied Steel and Wire, Kalamazoo Computer Group, Dexion, British United Shoe Machinery and UEF suddenly faced losing their whole life savings and her work contributed to establishing the Pension Protection Fund and the Financial Assistance Scheme. She has also supported the campaign for people whose pensions were placed in peril by Equitable Life.

In 2011, she campaigned against the sudden, short notice increases in women's state pension age, achieving success in reducing the planned rises, and was instrumental in highlighting the injustices of the annuities market, which culminated in the Government's announcement of the end to quasi-mandatory annuitisation of pensions. Although best known for her work on pensions, she is also involved in economic analysis and most recently in highlighting the inadequacies of the social care system. She has twice been the recipient of the Pensions Personality of the Year Award. She is a governor of the London School of Economics. and also an advisor to the International Longevity Centre – UK. She was Director General of the Saga Group from 2010 to 2013. In 2011 her work as the "leading commentator on pensions and other matters affecting the lives of the nation's over 50s" was recognised when she was presented with the Public Affairs Achiever of the Year award.

== Education ==
Altmann attended the Henrietta Barnett School in Hampstead Garden Suburb, London. She graduated with a first-class honours degree in Economics from University College London and also won a Kennedy Scholarship to study at Harvard University, where she worked with prominent economists including Mervyn King and Larry Summers. She later received a PhD degree from the London School of Economics for research into pension income and later life poverty.

== Business career ==
A senior investment management role at Chase Manhattan, running the bank's international equity department in London, was followed by directorships at Rothschild International Asset Management and NatWest. Her work included advising on strategy for UK pension funds and funds established under the US ERISA rules, and advice to central banks. A full-time job gave her insufficient time with her young family, so in 1993 she became an independent investment consultant with clients including 3i, BT, HM Treasury, Standard Life, the BBC, Sky and Channel 4.

In July 2004, Altmann was appointed by the Labour Lord Chancellor, Lord Falconer, to the Strategic Investment Board for a three-year term. The announcement cited Altmann's work on the Myners Report and her then current position as non-executive policy adviser to the Policy Unit at 10 Downing Street on investment, pensions, savings and annuity policies.

== Pensions theft campaign ==
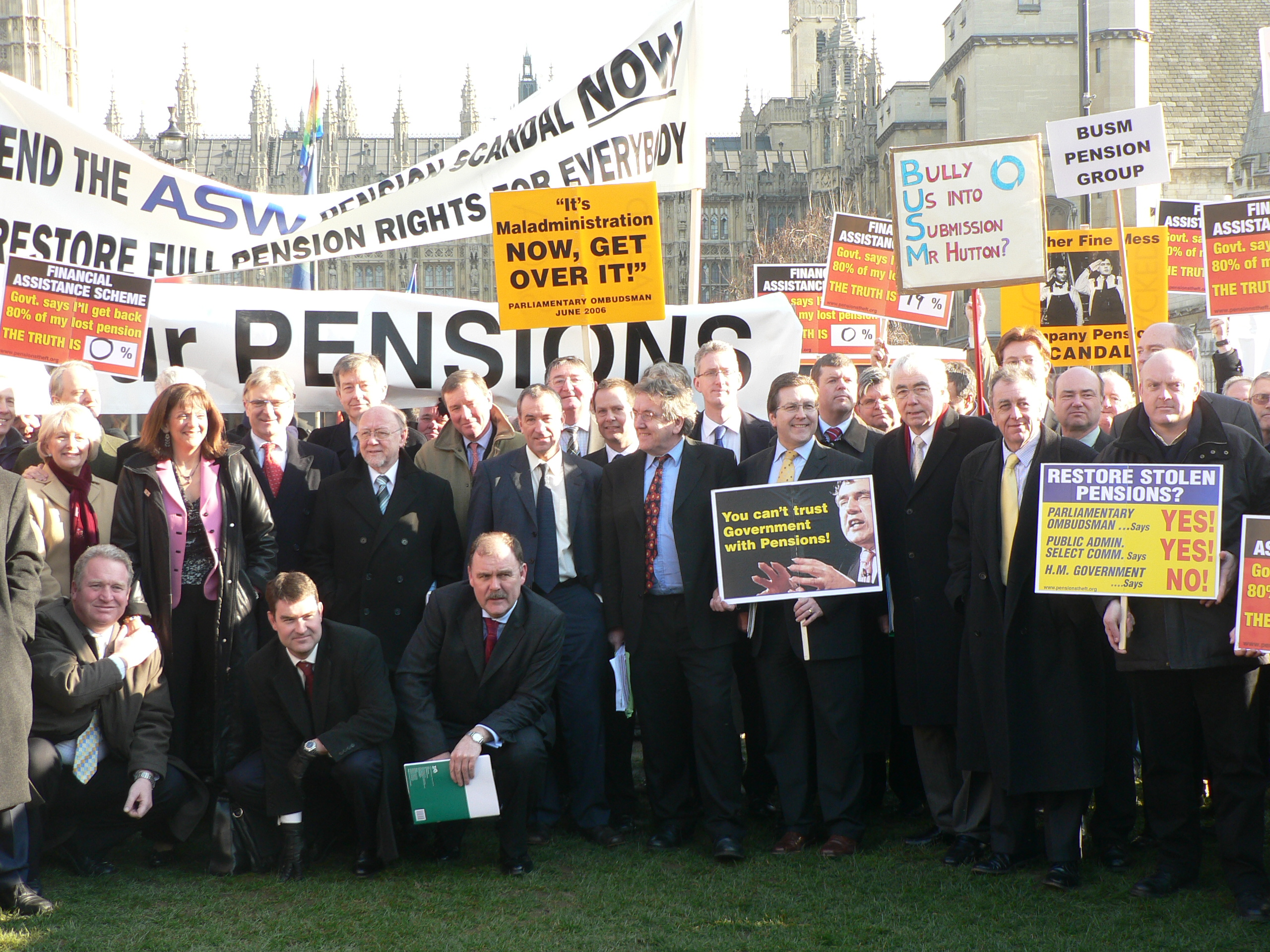
Ros Altmann (2nd left with MPs and campaigners, 7 February 2007)

The campaign which "propelled her into the media spotlight" began in July 2002 when Allied Steel and Wire, part of the former UK nationalised steel industry with plant in Sheerness and Cardiff went into receivership. Although their pension scheme was "fully funded" according to the prescribed UK government Minimum funding requirement formula, this level of funding was only sufficient to pay those already retired. The existing workforce, many of whom had very long service and were close to retirement, faced losing their entire pension, including their so-called Guaranteed Minimum Pension, which was introduced by the Government to replace some of their state pension entitlement, but which turned out to be neither guaranteed nor a minimum. The BBC's Panorama programme asked Altmann to go to Cardiff to explain to the workers what had happened to their pensions.

She used her political and press contacts to ensure Pensionstheft Action Group (PAG) appeared regularly in news bulletins and newspapers and devised the banner "Stripped of our pensions". She produced research papers, background briefings and media articles and gave numerous speeches calling for compensation.

In 2004, threatened by a back bench rebellion, the government introduced legislation to set up the Pension Protection Fund to help schemes which failed in future. It also offered limited retrospective compensation via a Financial Assistance Scheme, but only for those within three years of retirement and only for a small fraction of their pension while the majority of those affected would get nothing. This attempt to stave off political opposition did not address the injustices so Altmann helped the victims put together appeals via their MPs to the Parliamentary Ombudsman, Ann Abraham, who selected four representative complaints and launched a detailed investigation into the role of Government in these pension losses.

The Ombudsman's report was published in March 2006, and found official information "inaccurate, incomplete, unclear and inconsistent". The ombudsman recommended the government consider offering compensation for lost pensions and the suffering and distress caused. The report was immediately rejected by the Labour Government.

In accordance with Parliamentary procedure when the ombudsman's recommendations are rejected, the Public Administration Select Committee examined the evidence. In July 2006, they published a report broadly agreeing with her conclusions. It was also rejected and Altmann took their case to solicitors Bindman & Partners. With Altmann's help, John Halford of Bindman's and barristers, Dinah Rose QC and Tom Hickman from Blackstone Chambers, agreed to work on a no win no fee basis, and prepared a Judicial Review. In February 2007, a High Court judge, Mr Justice Bean, found for the pensioners. He ruled that rejection of the Ombudsman's report was unlawful and irrational, and described the reasons for the omissions in the DWP leaflets as "minute textual analysis" of a kind that: "can in my view only give comfort to those who consider that it is unwise to believe anything one reads in a government publication. It is particularly ironic when applied to a leaflet whose back cover boasts that it has been awarded a Crystal Mark for clarity by the Plain English Campaign. PEC 3, especially page 15, gives the clear impression that following the enactment of the new law scheme members can be reassured that their pensions are safe whatever happens. I have no doubt that this is what it was designed to do. I agree with the Ombudsman that it was inaccurate and misleading." The government appealed, and the case was heard by three Appeal Court judges in late July 2007.

Meanwhile, in the March 2007 budget the Chancellor of the Exchequer announced additional funding for the Financial Assistance Scheme and a review to be carried out by Andrew Young to find the most efficient method of using existing scheme funds and any other appropriate finance. This reported in December 2007 after a delay but it eventually led to an announcement from Secretary of State Peter Hain and Pensions Minister Mike O'Brien of an increased level of assistance which most commentators (and the Parliamentary Ombudsman) considered to be fair as it was on a par with the Pension Protection Fund.

In February 2008, much later than expected, the Appeal Court delivered its verdict: the government was once again found guilty of misleading the pensioners and the constitutional position of the ombudsman was clarified. The government can reject the PO findings but must provide "cogent reasons" for doing so to Parliament, a simple difference of opinion would not suffice. The government announced it was considering appealing directly to the House of Lords, but in March 2008 it decided to accept the Appeal Court verdict. The campaign had taken over five years of continuous effort for which Altmann received no payment. Writing in Glasgow's Herald newspaper, following Altmann's CBE award, Simon Bain explained in summary that a total of 165,000 members and 1,050 schemes were affected with payments by mid-2014 of just under £500m.

== Equitable Life campaign ==
Altmann has also supported the 1,500,000 Equitable Life policyholders in their fight for compensation following pension losses blamed on inadequate government regulation of the company. Newspapers began questioning the adequacy of the company's reserves in 1998 but the "Equitable Life scandal" became major news in 2000 when the House of Lords decided that the company had to honour its Guaranteed Annuity Rate promises. In 2001, close to collapse and now facing an additional £1.5bn shortfall met by raiding the with-profits fund, it put itself up for sale and stopped taking new business.

The Penrose report, commissioned by the Treasury in 2001, was finally published in 2004 after delays due to vetting by Treasury lawyers. The report said that for a decade the company had promised its policyholders more than it could deliver. The Government Actuary's Department had failed to understand Equitable's statutory returns to the Department of Trade and Industry (DTI) throughout the 1990s and there was a lack of co-ordination between the DTI and the Securities and Investment Board. However Penrose deemed the regulatory failures were secondary and the public expected too much of the regulators. The European Parliament also said the government had failed to regulate Equitable Life.

In July 2008, the Parliamentary Ombudsman published her report after a four-year investigation. Altmann questioned "whether the holes in our regulatory regime are due to a system driven too much by the interests of the industries being regulated, rather than the ordinary people who need to be protected". She also expressed her "fear that the Government could try to resist any calls for Equitable Life compensation in the same way that it continuously refused to properly remedy the occupational pensions scandal over the last 10 years".

The Ombudsman's report had been due at the end of 2005. Altmann, blaming delays on the investigated departments, accused the government of deliberately acting slowly, and called for prompt compensation.

In May 2009, as the Parliamentary Ombudsman issued a "special report on unremedied injustice", Altmann asked "What is the point of Parliament appointing an independent adjudicator if ministers can simply keep on ignoring her decisions?" In July 2009, as Equitable Life victims threatened legal action naming the DTI, the Government Actuary's Department and the FSA, Altmann again urged the government to pay up promptly.

In 2011, the coalition government finally established a compensation scheme which started paying victims some compensation during 2012–13.

== Annuities reform ==
Altmann campaigned for many years for reform of the annuities market, in particular the sales process. She believed the sales process failed to ensure customers understood the risks of annuity purchase (even though the transaction was irreversible) and did not help them find the right type of annuity. Annuities were often sold without advice to customers who felt compelled to purchase an annuity if they needed income from their pension fund and did not have substantial sums. She called for change as long ago as 2001.

As the Bank of England pursued its ultra-low interest rate policy and quantitative easing, Altmann continually highlighted the problems this caused to savers in general and pensions and annuities in particular. Altmann described the December 2013 Financial Services Consumer Panel (FSCP) report on Annuities as the "most damning indictment" of the annuity market she had seen. She added "It is failing a generation of pensioners. I have been calling for years for this to happen and I can only pray that now, regulators will be shamed into taking the action so badly needed in one of the last areas of financial services where rip off charges are still condoned."

In her report "Pensions – Time for change" in October 2013, Altmann warned that the Act -under which employers started automatic enrolment in October 2012- could expose workers to "risky, hard-to-understand and outdated retirement saving schemes." Workers with a defined contribution (DC) scheme were obliged to choose an annuity on retirement and "the risk of buying at the wrong time, choosing the wrong annuity or failing to find the right rate could increase the number of poorer pensioners by many millions." She said that the Government's reforms "require people "to be able to cope with risks that they do not really understand." Her statement was followed the next day by a call from Prince Charles for a pensions industry 'fit for 21st Century' The UK budget of March 2014 addressed many of the criticisms, and journalist Rebecca Burn-Callander discussing her CBE award highlighted her contribution to avoiding exploitation of annuities.

== Views on coalition pension reforms ==
Altmann has criticised changes to inflation protection of state pensions. In 2010 the government changed the basis from the Retail Price Index (RPI) to the historically lower Consumer Prices Index (CPI) but introduced the "triple lock guarantee". This fixes the annual state pension increase effective each April as the higher of the increase in price inflation, earnings growth or 2.5%. Price inflation is measured by annual Consumer Price Inflation (CPI), earnings growth by the Average Earnings index. Both as measured to September of the previous year. This resulted in a 2.7% increase for 2014, but Altmann pointed out that the RPI had risen by around 3%, so the old measure would have been more beneficial.

== Monetary policy ==
Altmann is an outspoken critic of quantitative easing. She has warned of the dangers of interfering with the risk-free interest rate that underpins all financial asset prices. She was also an advocate of slow rises in interest rates as she could see the UK economy had started to grow strongly, well before others recognised this. She has also highlighted the distributional consequences of the Bank of England's policies, which she believes have redistributed national income and wealth away from the young, the old and the north of the country towards the wealthiest members of society, the south and those with the largest mortgages.

== Business champion for older workers ==
In July 2014, Altmann was appointed business champion for older workers with the remit to encourage employment of more workers over 50. On her appointment as Pensions Minister Steve Webb described her as someone with a reputation for speaking up without fear or favour. In the UK only 60% of people over 50 are in work compared to 70% "in many other countries", and the number not working is likely to increase from 2.9 million to 3.7 million in the next 10 years. Employers cannot ask a candidate's date of birth but Altmann suggested that although 'O' levels which ceased in 1987 have a better reputation than GCSEs, employers are using them to identify and reject older workers. The honesty of the older generation was counting against them.

In March 2015, Altmann gave an interview to The Independent ahead of her report on older workers. She called for recruiters to clearly state that jobs were open to people of all ages and also warned that whilst most men's careers can progress until the age of 55, women stop at 45.

== Pensions minister ==
=== Appointment ===
In April 2015, Prime Minister David Cameron announced that if the Conservative Party won the 2015 general election, he would appoint Altmann as a financial services minister in the House of Lords responsible for consumer protection and financial education. However, after the election, on 11 May, Altmann was appointed Pensions Minister at the Department for Work and Pensions. The pensions industry immediately called on her to ensure "free and impartial" advice was available as promised. She was raised to the peerage as Baroness Altmann, of Tottenham in the London Borough of Haringey on 19 May 2015.

Patrick Collison in The Guardian credited her with having already saved pensioner benefits such as winter fuel allowances, free eye tests and free bus passes from Coalition cuts. He also highlighted her reputation as an economist completely opposed to the quantitative easing which she saw as reducing pensioners incomes but warned that she was too successful and there was no one of her effectiveness looking after the needs of the young.

In September 2015, Altmann was ejected from the Labour Party after HuffPost revealed that she was a member, most recently since March 2014, while also serving as a Tory minister.

=== Automatic enrolment ===
Writing in October 2015, Altmann described the work already done to ensure 60,000 large and medium-sized firms offer automatic pensions enrolment and new facilities provided by The Pensions Regulator for the 1.8 million small companies who are being encouraged to do the same. Altmann believes the millions more who will benefit in later life is a prize worth having. Speaking at a Trades Union Congress on pensions she however expressed concern that lower paid workers - especially women - could miss out on tax relief as a result of contributions being calculated on net pay rather than gross pay.

=== Views ===
==== Pensions Tax reform ====
Ahead of the 2016 budget Altmann "raised concerns" about George Osborne's proposed pensions tax reforms which could have seen the abolition of tax relief on savings in exchange for removing taxation on withdrawals. She said it would discourage savings. Her concerns, added to those of Conservative MPs, led to the abandonment of the scheme.

==== Resignation of Duncan Smith ====
Altmann declared herself shocked by the resignation of Iain Duncan Smith as he had championed the very reforms of disability benefits he claimed had caused his resignation. She accused him of undermining her work and claimed that he had been looking for a reason to resign for some time in order to damage the party leadership's campaign to stay in Europe.

==== Competitiveness of pensions market ====
In February 2016 Altmann noted that pensions providers relied on intermediaries for sales and didn't sell directly to the general public or study their requirements. She believes that leading internet companies such as Google or Amazon could transform the market.

==== Resignation ====
In July 2016, following the appointment of Theresa May as Prime Minister, Altmann resigned from her ministerial position. Her letter of resignation stated that she was "not convinced that the government had adequately addressed the hardship facing women who have had their state pension age increased at short notice".

According to the Financial Times, she was very unhappy that the rescue plan for Tata Steel proposed by Sajid Javid would involve the Government legislating to reduce pension benefits of scheme members or the Pension Protection Fund taking responsibility for a viable business -a change of policy which she believed could wreck pensions. The Department for Work and Pensions agreed with her. However, Tata reviewed its position in the UK following Brexit.

== Post-resignation ==
=== Views on property as a method of financing retirement ===
In August 2016, Altmann criticised 'irresponsible' comments by the Bank of England's chief economist Andy Haldane that property was better for financing retirement than a pension. Haldane based his claims on the probability that continuing shortage of housing would cause price increases and stated that he found pensions too complicated to understand. Altmann took issue with Haldane's suggestion that he wasn't wealthy pointing out his £180k basic salary, 2 homes and gold plated pension.

In October 2016, she made a personal appeal to Theresa May to ban pension cold calls. Over 10 million such calls are made annually with fraudulent calls resulting in losses of £18m. Altmann, who says she tried to get a ban when she was pensions minister, was supported by Steve Webb. Both emphasised the importance of taking action before any money was transferred.

=== Warning about complacency on elderly care ===
In November 2016, Altmann warned that the UK risked "sleepwalking into a social care crisis." She claimed that elderly care was already causing a financial crisis in the NHS and suggested tax breaks should be used to encourage people to save for care home costs.

=== Brexit ===
Altmann is a member of the All-Party Parliamentary Group on EU Relation, which is strongly opposed to Brexit. In 2017, she publicly endorsed James Chapman's call for a new centrist party, the Democrats, which would have the explicit aim of overturning Brexit. In early 2019, she co-founded the group Right to Vote, which advocates holding a new referendum on the UK's membership of the EU.

=== Roles ===
Altmann became a Vice President of the Jewish Leadership Council in June 2019.

On 31 July 2025, she was a signatory of a letter from 38 House of Lords members opposing the UK's plan to recognise a State of Palestine: the peers said Palestine "does not meet the international law criteria for recognition of a state, namely, defined territory, a permanent population, an effective government and the capacity to enter into relations with other states".

== Personal life ==
Altmann is married to Paul Richer, has three grown-up children and lives in North London. Altmann is Orthodox Jewish and is a regular attender at her local Finchley Synagogue.

She was appointed as Commander of the Order of the British Empire (CBE) in the 2014 Birthday Honours for services to pensioners and pension provision.

She has two honorary doctorates - a Doctorate of Letters from Westminster University and Doctorate in Civil Law from Newcastle University - both recognising her pioneering work in investment for pension schemes and improving retirement policies.
