= CAD/CAM =

Computer-Aided Design/Computer-Aided Manufacturing

CAD/CAM refers to the integration of computer-aided design (CAD) and computer-aided manufacturing (CAM). Both of these require powerful computers. CAD software helps designers and draftsmen; CAM "reduces manpower costs" in the manufacturing process.

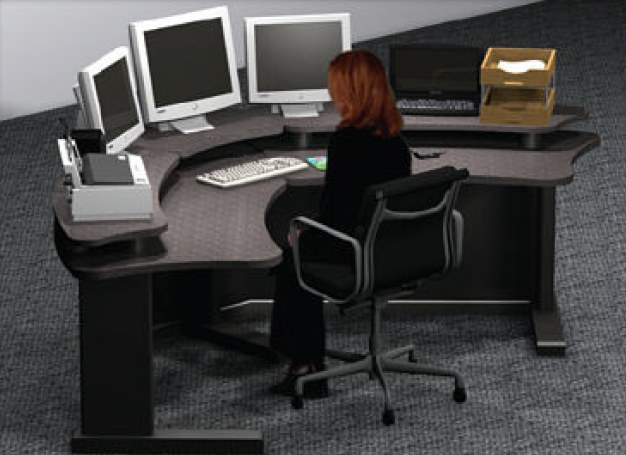
CAD workstation and operator

== Overview ==
Both CAD and CAM are computer-intensive. Although, in 1981, Computervision was #1 and IBM was #2, IBM had a major advantage: its systems could accommodate "eight to 20" users at a time, whereas most competitors only had enough power to accommodate "four to six." CAD/CAM was described by The New York Times as a "computerized design and manufacturing process" that made its debut "when Computervision pioneered it in the 1970s."

Other 1980s major players in CAD/CAM included General Electric and Parametric Technology Corporation; the latter subsequently acquired Computervision, which had been acquired by Prime Computer.

CAD/CAM originated in the 1960s; an IBM 360/44 was used to build via CNC the wings of an airplane.

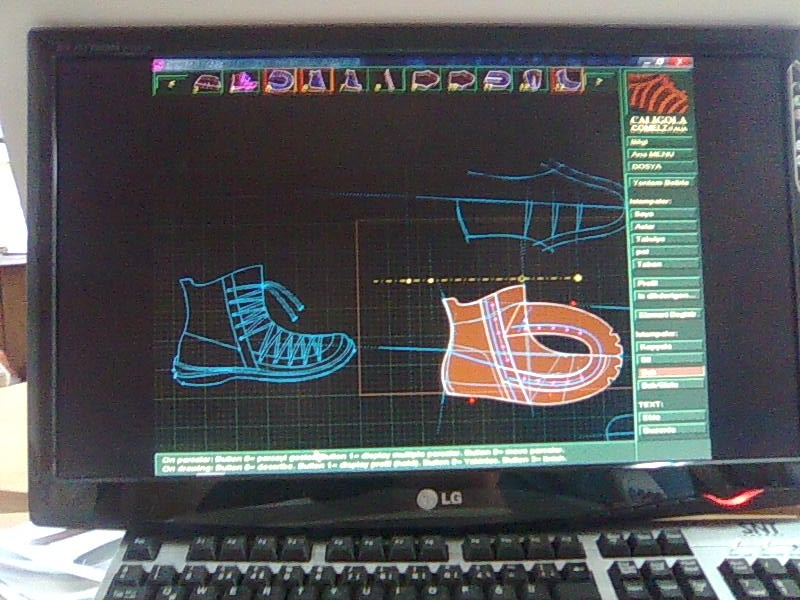
CAD (Computer-aided design) screen

== Computer-aided design (CAD) ==
One goal of CAD is to allow quicker iterations in the design process; another is to enable smoothly transitioning to the CAM stage. Although manually created drawings historically facilitated "a designer's goal of displaying an idea," it did not result in a machine-readable result that could be modified and subsequently be used to directly build a prototype. It can also be used to "ensure that all the separate parts of a product will fit together as intended."

CAD, when linked with simulation, can also enable bypassing building a less than satisfactory test version, resulting in having "dispensed with the costly, time-consuming task of building a prototype."

== Computer-aided manufacturing (CAM) ==
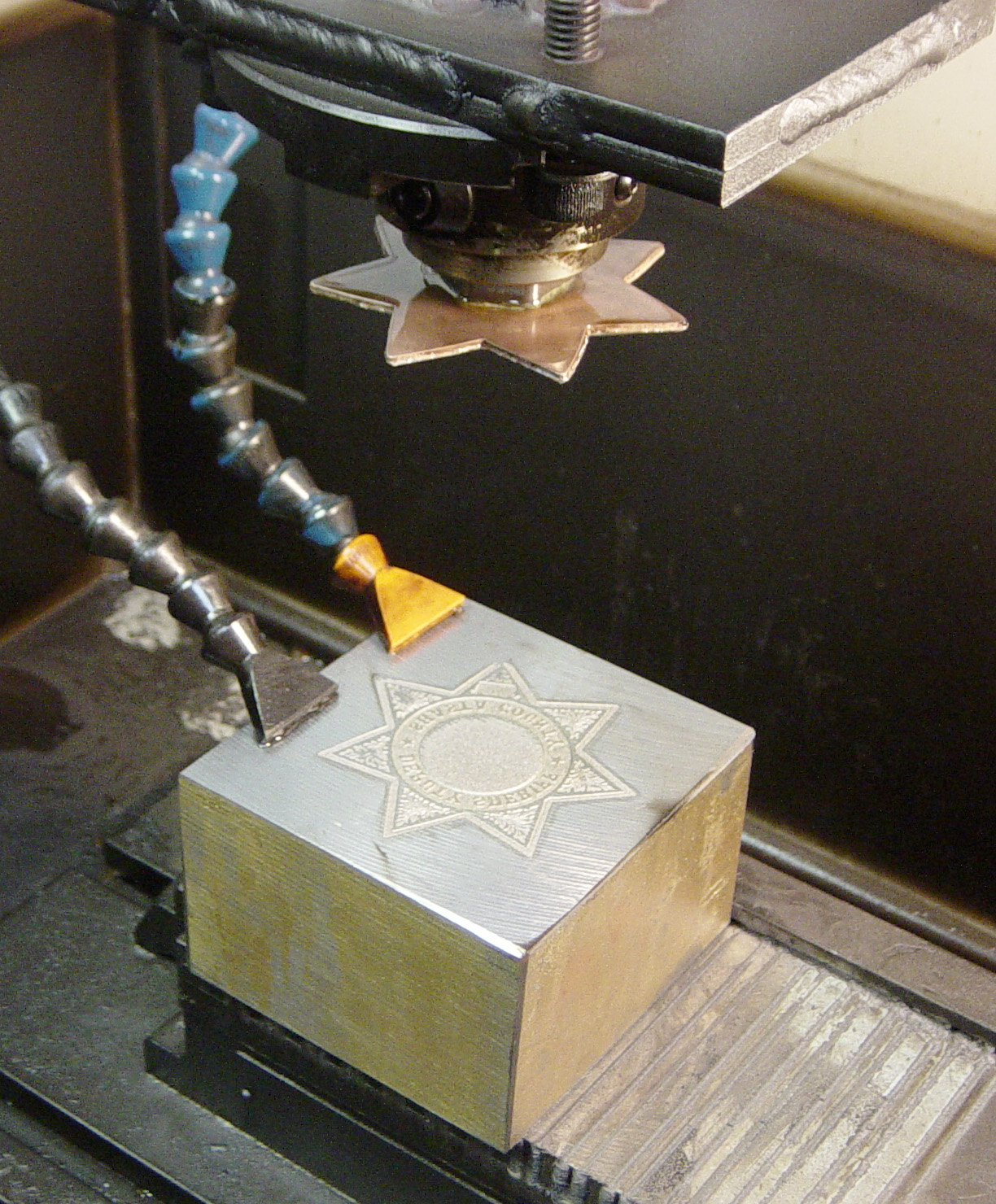
CAM in action, using computerized Numerical Control

In Computer-aided manufacturing (CAM), using computerized specifications, a computer directs machines such as lathes and milling machines to perform work that otherwise would be controlled by a lathe or milling machine operator. This process, which is called Numerical Control (NC OR CNC), is what came to be known as 20th century Computer-aided manufacturing (CAM), and it originated in the 1960s. Early 21st century CAM introduced use of 3D printers.

CAM, although it requires initial expenditures for equipment, covers this outlay with reduced labor cost and speedy transition from CAD to finished product, especially when the result is both timely and "ensuring one-time machining success rate."

== See also ==
- Computer-aided technologies
- CAD/CAM dentistry
- CAD/CAM in the footwear industry
- Building information modeling (BIM)
