= MFR =

MFR may refer to:

- Rogue Valley International–Medford Airport, IATA code
- Marine Forces Reserve
- Medical first responder
- Melt flow rate of thermoplastic polymers
- Member of the Order of the Federal Republic, one of the Nigerian National Honours
- Methanofuran, a chemical compound
- Minimum funding requirement
- Mixed Flow Reactor, a type of chemical reactor
- MFR (radio station), a Scottish commercial radio station based in Inverness
- Music for Relief, a charity organisation founded by Linkin Park
- Myofascial release
- Météo-France La Réunion, the site of the RSMC La Réunion
