= United Shoe Machinery =

United Shoe Machinery may refer to:

- British United Shoe Machinery, a British-based company (once a parent company to all the below)
- United Shoe Machinery Company of Canada, a Canadian-based company
- United Shoe Machinery Corporation, a U.S.-based corporation
