= Pensions Act 1995 =

Act of the Parliament of the United Kingdom

Pensions Act 1995 (Note: Section 181.)
- Act of Parliament
- Parliament of the United Kingdom
- Long title: An Act to amend the law about pensions and for connected purposes.
- Citation: 1995 c. 26
- Territorial extent: United Kingdom

Dates
- Royal assent: 19 July 1995
- Commencement: various (Note: Section 180.)

Other legislation
- Amends: Administration of Justice Act 1970; Attachment of Earnings Act 1971; Pensions (Increase) Act 1971; Social Security Contributions and Benefits Act 1992; Social Security Administration Act 1992; Pension Schemes Act 1993
- Amended by: Employment Tribunals Act 1996; Employment Rights Act 1996; Justices of the Peace Act 1997; Statute Law (Repeals) Act 2004; Pensions Act 2004; Transfer of Tribunal Functions Order 2010; Tribunals, Courts and Enforcement Act 2007 (Consequential Amendments) Order 2012; Pensions Act 2014; Enterprise and Regulatory Reform Act 2013 (Consequential Amendments) (Bankruptcy) and the Small Business, Enterprise and Employment Act 2015 (Consequential Amendments) Regulations 2016; Pension Schemes Act 2026

Status: Amended

Text of statute as originally enacted

Revised text of statute as amended

Text of the Pensions Act 1995 as in force today (including any amendments) within the United Kingdom, from legislation.gov.uk.

The Pensions Act 1995 (c. 26) is an act of the Parliament of the United Kingdom, passed to improve the running of pension schemes.

== Background ==
Following the death of Robert Maxwell, it became clear that he had embezzled a large amount of money from the pension fund of Mirror Group Newspapers. The act was intended to strengthen regulation in response this.

== Provisions ==
The main features of the act included:

- The establishment of the Occupational Pensions Regulatory Authority
- The Minimum Funding Requirement (MFR) to ensure that all pension schemes had a minimum amount of money
- A compensation fund for pension schemes in the event of fraud
- Protection for existing pension scheme benefits so that they could not be reduced in the future without member consent
- A requirement for pension schemes to have member nominated trustees
- The equalisation of the pension ages for men and women
- Greater disclosure of information to members
- The introduction of clear documentation showing what should be paid into a scheme, and monitoring of those contributions
- A minimum rate of increase to apply once in payment to pension earned after the date on which the Act came into force
- A restructuring of the link between state and occupational pension schemes

Many of the features introduced by the Act were abolished or amended by the Pensions Act 2004. The MFR was heavily criticised in the Myners Report (2001), which was a HM Treasury sponsored report into institutional investment in the UK. The Myners Report identified three problems with the MFR:

- For some pension funds, the level of assets under the MFR was insufficient to provide the benefits promised by the scheme
- Regulatory costs for sponsoring firms increased without any reduction in the risks of fund insolvency
- Sponsoring firms focused on meeting the narrow requirements of the MFR, rather than on ensuring that the scheme was appropriately funded.

The act replaced the MFR from September 2005 with a new scheme-specific "statutory funding objective" (SFO), allowing more flexibility to individual schemes' circumstances whilst at the same time protecting members' benefits. The act established the Pension Regulator with the power to require sponsoring companies to fully fund their pension liabilities, by adopting an appropriate recovery strategy consistent with the SFO. Liu and Tonks (2012) examine the effect of a company's pension commitments on its dividend and investment policies, assessing the impact of funding rules under the MFR, and also under the funding requirements introduced under the Pensions Act 2004. They find a strong negative relationship between a firm's dividend payments and its pension contributions, but a weaker effect on investments. They found that dividend and investment sensitivities to pension contributions were more pronounced after the introduction of the Pensions Act 2004.

== Bibliography ==
- R Goode, Pension Law Reform (HMSO 1993) Cmnd 2342
- E McGaughey, A Casebook on Labour Law (Hart 2019 *) ch 6(4)
