= Pensions Act 2004 =

Act of the Parliament of the United Kingdom

Pensions Act 2004 (Note: Section 325.)
- Act of Parliament
- Parliament of the United Kingdom
- Long title: An Act to make provision relating to pensions and financial planning for retirement and provision relating to entitlement to bereavement payments, and for connected purposes.
- Citation: 2004 c. 35
- Territorial extent: England and Wales; Scotland; Northern Ireland (in part); (Note: Section 323.)

Dates
- Royal assent: 18 November 2004
- Commencement: Various (Note: Section 322.)
Other legislation
Amends	House of Commons Disqualification Act 1975; Courts and Legal Services Act 1990; Social Security Contributions and Benefits Act 1992; Social Security Administration Act 1992; Judicial Pensions and Retirement Act 1993; Pension Schemes Act 1993; Pensions Act 1995; Criminal Procedure (Consequential Provisions) (Scotland) Act 1995; Terrorism Act 2000; Anti-terrorism, Crime and Security Act 2001
Amended by	Constitutional Reform and Governance Act 2010; Charities Act 2011; Pensions Act 2014; Employment Rights Act 2025; Pension Schemes Act 2026

Status: Amended

Text of statute as originally enacted

Revised text of statute as amended

The Pensions Act 2004 (c. 35) is an act of the Parliament of the United Kingdom to improve the running of pension schemes.

== Background ==
In the years following the introduction of the Pensions Act 1995, it was widely perceived that it was failing to offer the protection to pension scheme members that had been anticipated. The Occupational Pensions Regulatory Authority was perceived as being reactive, didactic and uncommercial. The minimum funding requirement had not prevented some pension schemes winding up with insufficient assets to secure their liabilities, amid considerable publicity. There was strong political pressure to establish a guarantee fund similar to the American Pension Benefit Guaranty Corporation. Much of the regulation was perceived to be unnecessarily restrictive. The Pensions Act 2004 was written to try to fix these deficiences. The Act introduced two new regulatory institutions: the Pensions Regulator, with the powers to require sponsoring companies to make contributions to ensure that scheme funding objectives are met; and the Pension Protection Fund, which would inherit the pension liabilities of a pension scheme in the event that a sponsoring company becomes insolvent.

In assessing the consequences of the act, there is evidence that corporate dividend and investment sensitivities to pension contributions were more pronounced in and after 2005, indicating that the regulations imposed by the act had a significant effect on corporate expenditures.

== Overview ==
The main features of the act include:

- The abolition of the Occupational Pensions Regulatory Authority and its replacement by the Pensions Regulator, with wider powers to intervene of its own volition;
- New powers for the Pensions Regulator to intervene where employers, directors and majority shareholders were perceived to be avoiding their responsibilities to pension schemes and where employers were insufficiently resourced to support the pension scheme;
- New notification requirements;
- The establishment of the Pension Protection Fund to provide benefits for pension scheme members where a pension scheme had gone into winding-up with insufficient resources to fund scheme benefits and no employer to make good the underfunding;
- The abolition of the minimum funding requirement and its replacement with scheme-specific funding requirements;
- Modification of the protections for existing pension scheme benefits and of the requirements for pension schemes to have member nominated trustees.

== Provisions ==
The act forces companies to pay into a protection fund which will cover workers pensions if they go bust.

=== Contents ===
- Part 1, The Pensions Regulator, ss 1–106
- Part 2, The Board of the Pension Protection Fund, ss 107–220
- Part 3, Scheme Funding ss 221–233
- Part 4, Financial Planning for Retirement, ss 234–238
- Part 5, Occupational and Personal Pension Schemes: Miscellaneous Provisions, ss 239–285
- Part 6, Financial Assistance Scheme for Members of Certain Pension Schemes, s 286
- Part 7, Cross-border Activities within European Union, ss 287–295
- Part 8, State Pensions, s 296–299
- Part 9, Miscellaneous and Supplementary, ss 300–325

Schedules

- Schedule 1, The Pensions Regulator
- Schedule 2, The reserved regulatory functions
- Schedule 3, Restricted information held by the Regulator: certain permitted disclosures to facilitate exercise of functions
- Schedule 4, The Pensions Regulator Tribunal
- Schedule 5, The Board of the Pension Protection Fund
- Schedule 6, Transfer of property, rights and liabilities to the Board
- Schedule 7, Pension compensation provisions
- Schedule 8, Restricted information held by the Board: certain permitted disclosures to facilitate exercise of functions
- Schedule 9, Reviewable matters
- Schedule 10, Use and supply of information: private pensions policy and retirement planning
- Schedule 11, Deferral of retirement pensions and shared additional pensions
- Schedule 12, Minor and consequential amendments
- Schedule 13, Repeals and revocations

== Commencement ==
The act came into effect in April 2005.

== Reception ==
According to the Pensions Institute at Cass Business School, its survey employers were disenchanted with the act due to the higher running costs it had caused.

== See also ==
- UK labour law
- Pensions in the United Kingdom
- Pensions Act 1995
