= Financial Assistance Scheme =

The Financial Assistance Scheme (FAS) is a British scheme under the UK welfare system, that offers help to members of eligible schemes who have lost out on their pension either because their employer became insolvent between 1 January 1997 and 5 April 2005, or is solvent but under a "compromise agreement" and no longer has to meet its commitment to pay its debt to the pension scheme.

== Funding ==
It is funded by scheme assets and an estimated £1.9B of taxation and is managed by Board of the Pension Protection Fund (PPF), established by the Pensions Act 2004 which is accountable to Parliament through the Secretary of State for Work and Pensions. However the FAS is financially separate from the PPF which is funded by a levy on direct benefit schemes. The pension is revalued in line with Price inflation up to National Retirement Age and the FAS tops up any amount received from a scheme annuity to a nominal 90% of the previously expected pension (up to a maximum of the FAS cap). It can also pay ill health benefits. Indexation rules change at retirement, such that some elements may not receive increases.
