= Pension Protection Fund =

UK body responsible for paying pension compensation

Statutory corporation overview
- Formed: 2005
- Jurisdiction: United Kingdom
- Parent department: Department for Work and Pensions
- Website: ppf.co.uk
- Assets under management: £31.5 billion (31 March 2026)

The Pension Protection Fund (PPF) is a UK statutory corporation established by the Pensions Act 2004 to provide compensation to members of eligible defined benefit (DB) pension schemes when their sponsoring employer becomes insolvent and the scheme cannot meet its promised benefits. The PPF is funded by income from investments, assets from scheme that transfer into the fund and recoveries from insolvent employers. It may also charge a levy on DB schemes. It is not funded by general taxation. As of 31 March 2026, the PPF reported assets under management of £31.5 billion.

== Governance and accountability ==
The PPF is run by an independent board and is accountable to Parliament through the Secretary of State for Work and Pensions. It also administers related arrangements including the Fraud Compensation Fund (FCF) and the government’s Financial Assistance Scheme (FAS).

== Eligible schemes ==
The PPF protects most occupational DB schemes in the UK. Public sector DB schemes backed by a Crown guarantee are not covered by the PPF.

Previously, all eligible schemes were required to pay and annual levy. Due to changes in the Pension Schemes Act 2026, the PPF can decide not to charge a levy.

== Scheme assessment ==
When a sponsoring employer suffers an insolvency event, a scheme does not automatically enter the PPF. Instead, it first enters an assessment period, typically lasting 18–24 months, during which scheme data are validated and the PPF assesses the scheme’s assets and liabilities. Trustees remain responsible for day-to-day running and for paying pensions during assessment. If the scheme can afford to secure benefits at or above PPF compensation levels (for example, by purchasing annuities), it will wind up outside the PPF, otherwise, the scheme’s assets transfer to the PPF and the Board assumes responsibility for paying compensation.

== Compensation ==
The Pension Protection Fund pays compensation to members of eligible defined benefit schemes whose sponsoring employer becomes insolvent and the scheme cannot afford to pay the benefits promised.

=== Level of compensation ===
- Members who were already over the scheme’s normal pension age at the assessment date receive 100% compensation. Survivors’ pensions and ill-health pensions are also paid at the 100% level.
- Most other members receive 90% of the value of their scheme pension.
- The statutory compensation cap was disapplied following the Court of Appeal judgment in Secretary of State for Work and Pensions v Hughes in July 2021.
- In line with the Hampshire ruling and subsequent UK regulations, each member and each survivor must receive at least 50% of the actuarial value of the benefits they would have received from the former scheme over their lifetime.

=== Increases once in payment ===
- Compensation relating to service before 6 April 1997, previously did not increase in payment. The Pension Schemes Act 2026 enables the PPF to pay inflation-linked increases, from January 2027, of up to 2.5 per cent per year, on pre-1997 benefits, where scheme rules provided for them.
- Compensation relating to service from 6 April 1997 increases each year in line with the Consumer Prices Index, subject to a maximum of 2.5% a year.

=== Revaluation before payment ===
- While a member’s compensation is deferred, it is increased in line with CPI each year until it comes into payment. The statutory caps are 5% a year for accrual before 6 April 2009 and 2.5% a year for accrual from 6 April 2009.

=== Early, normal and late retirement ===
- Early retirement is usually possible from age 55. The normal minimum pension age in legislation is due to increase to 57 from April 2028. Taking compensation early results in an actuarial reduction. Deferring beyond normal pension age increases the annual amount.

=== Survivors’ compensation ===
- Where the former scheme provided a survivors’ pension, the PPF generally pays a survivors’ pension equal to 50% of the member’s post-commutation compensation.

=== Lump sums ===
- In most cases a member can commute part of their compensation for a tax-free lump sum of up to 25% of the value when compensation starts, subject to HMRC rules and any transitional protections.

== Levies ==
One of the PPF’s four funding sources is an annual levy charged to eligible DB schemes. The levy has two components:

- a scheme-based levy (payable by all eligible schemes), based primarily on scheme size; and
- a risk-based levy that reflects the sponsoring employer’s insolvency risk, the scheme’s underfunding risk and its investment risk.

The PPF’s insolvency risk partner assesses the likelihood of a sponsoring employer becoming insolvent each month and generates an insolvency risk score. The PPF averages scores over a 12-month period (April–March) and allocates employers to one of ten levy bands, each with a different levy rate. Higher-risk bands attract higher levy rates.

=== Recent developments ===
In January 2025 the PPF set a levy estimate of £45 million for 2025/26 and included in the rules a provision to recalculate the conventional levy to zero if appropriate legislative changes progressed during the year. On 23 September 2025 the PPF confirmed that it would not charge a conventional levy for 2025/26. This change set both the scheme-based and risk-based levy rates to zero and saved schemes and sponsors about £45 million in that year.

Press coverage linked the announcement to stronger DB scheme funding and to proposed legislative changes that would allow a zero levy without blocking future increases if required. For comparison, the levy estimate was £100 million in 2024/25 and £200 million in 2023/24.

In February 2026, the PPF confirmed they wouldn’t charge conventional schemes a PPF levy for 2026/27, while maintaining a risk-based levy for Alternative Covenant Schemes.

The PPF will make this decision annually.

== List of schemes ==
A list of schemes that have transferred into the PPF is available on the PPF website.

== See also ==
- Pension Benefit Guaranty Corporation – United States equivalent
