= CAD/CAM in the footwear industry =

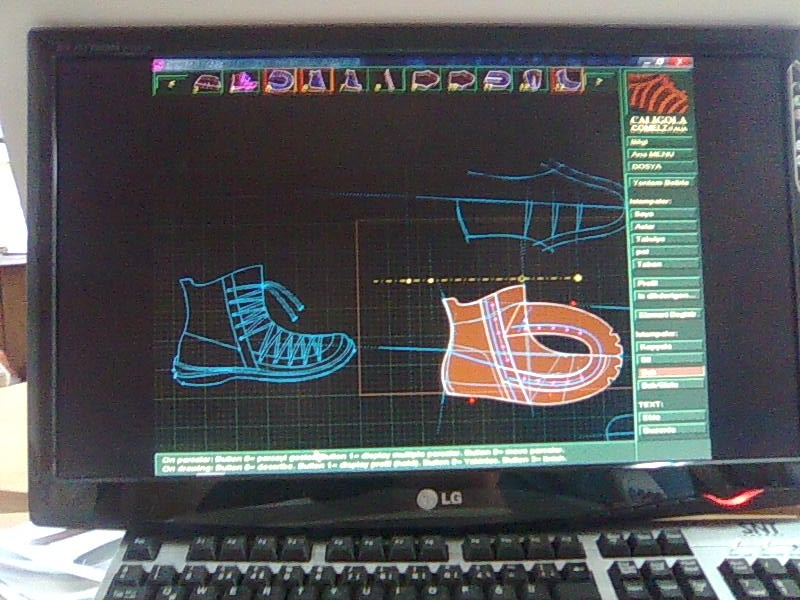
View of a design stage of a women's boot on computer monitor

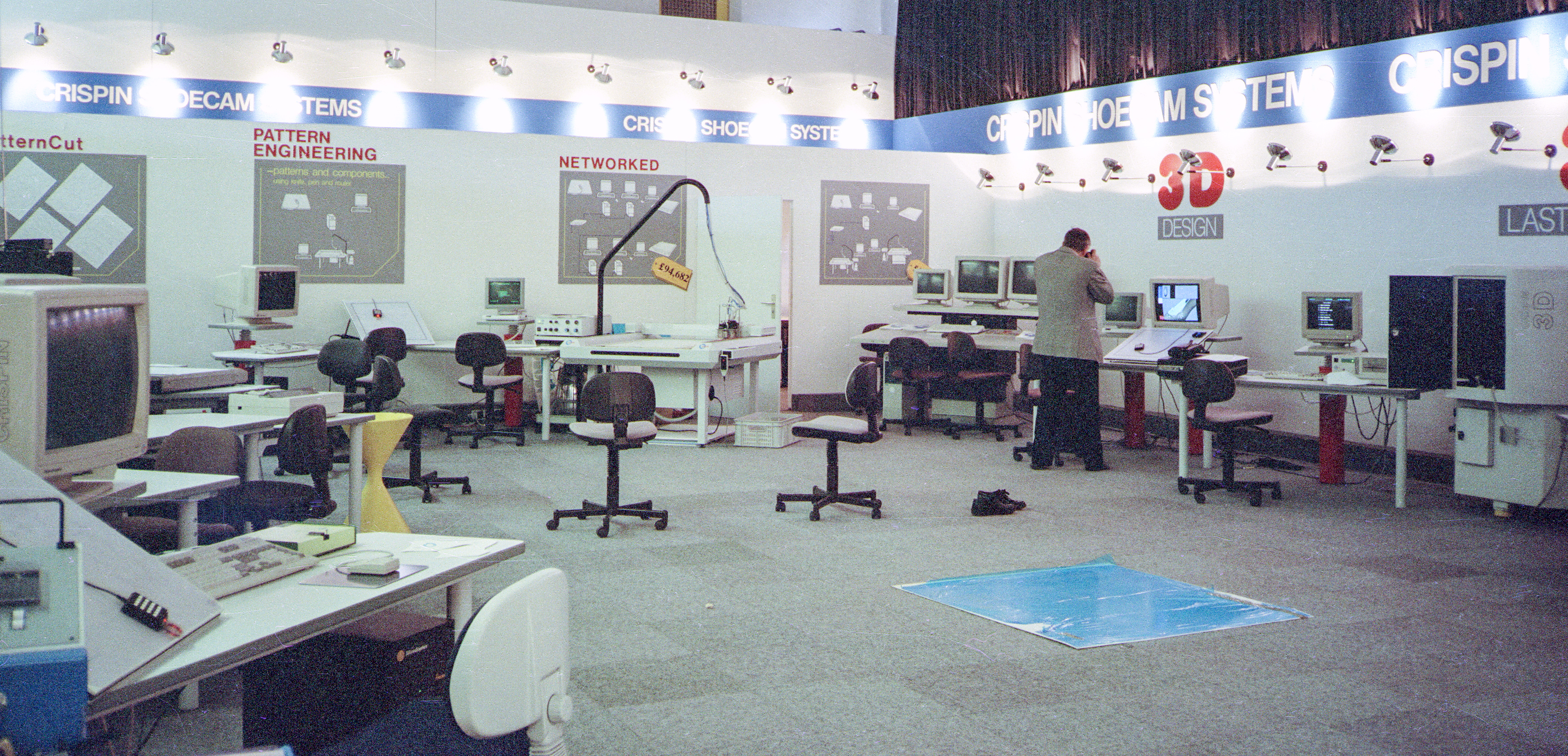
The wide range of elements of the Crispin shoe CAD/CAM system, then supplied by United Shoe Machinery on their stand at the fair at Pirmasens, Germany, late 1990s

CAD/CAM in the footwear industry is the use of computers and graphics software for designing and grading of shoe upper patterns and, for manufacturing of cutting dies, shoe lasts and sole moulds. CAD/CAM software is a PC-based system, which is made up of program modules. Today, there are 2D and 3D versions of CAD/CAM systems in the shoe industry.

Computer aided design was introduced in the shoe industry in the 1970s. Initially, it was used primarily for pattern grading. It enabled manufacturers to perform complex grading relatively easily and quickly. CAD systems today have been developed with a much wider range of functions. Logos, textures, and other decorations can be incorporated into product designs of both the uppers and soles to help reinforce branding on all areas of the model. It automates routine procedures, increasing speed and consistency, whilst reducing the possibility of mistakes. CAD data can now be used effectively for a wide variety of activities across footwear manufacturing business. CAD/CAM generates data at the design stage, which can be used right through the planning and manufacturing stages.

Latest improvements in the CAD/CAM technology are:

- Graphic capabilities and interconnectivity have improved enormously.
- Software developments have progressively made systems more intuitive and easier to use.
- With 2D sketch and paint modules, a serviceable sketch can be produced and then colour and texture can be added.
- 3D systems enable the last and design to be viewed from any perspective and several angles even simultaneously.

With CAD/CAM software, footwear manufacturers can cut their time to market dramatically and so increase market share and profitability. In addition, the power and flexibility of the software can overcome restrictions to the designer's creativity imposed by traditional methods.

== Sole design ==
CAD/CAM software can be used to generate machining data for shoe sole models and moulds Shoe sole mould makers are able to strengthen their capabilities of mould design and production techniques to meet the market demands for shorter product life cycle, quality improvement and handling versatile pattern design. This helps especially sports shoe producers to manufacture products rapidly and to introduce them earlier than their competitors.

3D CAD/CAM is the core technology for shoe sole mould in the footwear industry and develops towards specialization.

Benefits of CAD/CAM in the mould manufacturing are:

- Total modeling for rapid generation of design concepts and variations
- Reverse engineering from existing models or parts
- Easy design modification and morphing capability
- Completely accurate designs regardless of complexity
- Group grading of soles and uppers
- Advanced decorating techniques
- Realistic onscreen visualization
- Rapid generation of molds from product designs

== See also ==
List of 3D modeling software List of computer-aided manufacturing software
