= Minimum funding requirement =

Part of United Kingdom legislation

The Minimum Funding Requirement (MFR) was a part of United Kingdom legislation in the Pensions Act 1995, and was introduced on 6 April 1997. The Pensions Act 2004 abolishes the MFR replaces it with new "statutory funding objective"; this came into force on 30 December 2005 for all pension schemes with a valuation date after September 22, 2005.

The aim of the Minimum Funding Requirement was to set a minimum amount of assets that a defined benefit pension scheme should hold in order to fund its promised benefits. If a scheme did not hold sufficient assets, the pension scheme was required to achieve the minimum level within a given time scale.

For a scheme with less than 90% of the assets required, the scheme had to pay the shortfall below 90% within three years. Where the scheme was between 90% and 100%, the period was ten years.

Although legislation set out the broad requirements of the Minimum Funding Requirement, the details of the methods and assumptions to use were specified in Guidance Note 27, issued by the Institute of Actuaries and the Faculty of Actuaries.

After the introduction of the Minimum Funding Requirement, there were several modifications to the assumptions to cope with perceived weaknesses in the original basis. However, the level of assets required by the MFR never proved sufficient to provide the benefits promised by the scheme which the MFR was supposed to fund. The Pensions Act 2004 abolished the MFR and introduced a new scheme funding objective hoped to adapt more flexibly to individual schemes' circumstances but at the same time protecting members' benefits. Paul Myners report states on page 4: "I propose replacing the Minimum Funding Requirement, which distorts investment and fails to protect scheme members, with a long-term approach based on disclosure and openness instead of an artificial uniform yardstick."
