= Grade II* listed buildings in Leicester =

There are over 20,000 Grade II* listed buildings in England. This page show the list of these buildings in the city of Leicester.

== City of Leicester ==
Name	Location	Type	Completed (Note: The date given is the date used by Historic England as significant for the initial building or that of an important part in the structure's description.)	Date designated	Grid ref. (Note: The grid reference is based on the British national grid reference system, sometimes known as OSGB36, used by the Ordnance Survey.) Geo-coordinates	Entry number (Note: The "List Entry Number" is a unique number assigned to each listed building and scheduled monument by Historic England.)	Image
Aylestone Hall	Aylestone, City of Leicester	House	Medieval	23 February 1955	SK5743101132; 52°36′18″N 1°09′12″W	1361408	Aylestone Hall More images
Aylestone Old Bridge	Aylestone, City of Leicester	Bridge	15th century	23 February 1955	SK5678900936; 52°36′12″N 1°09′46″W	1074055	Aylestone Old Bridge More images
Belgrave Hall and railings and gates in front	Belgrave, City of Leicester	House	1709	5 January 1950	SK5927707216; 52°39′34″N 1°07′30″W	1074030	Belgrave Hall and railings and gates in front More images
Belgrave House, Railings and Piers in Front of Belgrave House	Belgrave, City of Leicester	House	1776	5 January 1950	SK5924807182; 52°39′33″N 1°07′32″W	1074033	Belgrave House, Railings and Piers in Front of Belgrave House More images
Leicester Cathedral	City of Leicester	Cathedral	12th century to 15th century	5 January 1950	SK5849804454; 52°38′05″N 1°08′13″W	1183725	Leicester Cathedral More images
Chantry House	City of Leicester	Chantry College	1511	5 January 1950	SK5834204099; 52°37′53″N 1°08′22″W	1074791	Chantry House More images
Church of All Souls	City of Leicester	Church	1904	14 March 1975	SK5862303116; 52°37′22″N 1°08′08″W	1074057	Church of All Souls More images
Church of St Andrew	Aylestone, City of Leicester	Church	13th century	5 January 1950	SK5718701016; 52°36′14″N 1°09′25″W	1074054	Church of St Andrew More images
Church of St Andrew and attached Former Schoolroom	City of Leicester	Church	1860-62	14 March 1975	SK5846303723; 52°37′41″N 1°08′16″W	1184162	Church of St Andrew and attached Former Schoolroom More images
Church of St James the Greater	City of Leicester	Church	1895-1901	15 January 1988	SK6002503300; 52°37′27″N 1°06′53″W	1361037	Church of St James the Greater More images
Church of St John the Baptist	City of Leicester	Church	1884-1885	14 March 1975	SK6022402621; 52°37′05″N 1°06′43″W	1074035	Church of St John the Baptist More images
Church of St Mark	City of Leicester	Church	1869 to 1872	14 March 1975	SK5905605366; 52°38′34″N 1°07′43″W	1300759	Church of St Mark More images
Church of St Saviour	City of Leicester	Church	1875-77	14 March 1975	SK6039004858; 52°38′17″N 1°06′33″W	1074774	Church of St Saviour More images
Leicester Corn Exchange	City of Leicester	Corn Exchange	1851	5 January 1950	SK5874804439; 52°38′04″N 1°08′00″W	1361417	Leicester Corn Exchange More images
Engineering Building, University of Leicester	City of Leicester	Faculty Building	1961-63	30 March 1993	SK5942302865; 52°37′13″N 1°07′25″W	1074756	Engineering Building, University of Leicester More images
Gates and Gatepiers North West of War Memorial Onto University Road	Victoria Park, City of Leicester	Gate	1923	14 March 1975	SK5940503300; 52°37′27″N 1°07′26″W	1361051	Gates and Gatepiers North West of War Memorial Onto University Road More images
HSBC, Granby Street, now ISKCON Leicester	City of Leicester	Bank (financial)	1872-1874	20 August 1972	SK5888704362; 52°38′02″N 1°07′53″W	1074047	HSBC, Granby Street, now ISKCON Leicester More images
Inglewood	City of Leicester	House	1892	14 March 1975	SK6048901836; 52°36′39″N 1°06′29″W	1074805	Inglewood More images
Iron Gates in Garden at rear of Skeffington House	City of Leicester	Gate	Early 18th century	14 March 1975	SK5834604158; 52°37′55″N 1°08′22″W	1074006	Iron Gates in Garden at rear of Skeffington House More images
Lodges and Gates North East of War Memorial	Victoria Park, City of Leicester	Gate	1923	23 February 1955	SK5973803519; 52°37′34″N 1°07′08″W	1185461	Lodges and Gates North East of War Memorial More images
Melbourne Hall Free Church and attached Memorial Schools	City of Leicester	Sunday School	1884	13 November 2002	SK6010403934; 52°37′47″N 1°06′48″W	1096016	Upload Photo
Monument to Edward Holdsworth at East End of Garden at Belgrave Hall including Statue of Religion	Belgrave, City of Leicester	Statue	1761	14 March 1975	SK5935707242; 52°39′35″N 1°07′26″W	1361396	Upload Photo
National Westminster Bank	City of Leicester	Bank (financial)	1900-1902	14 March 1975	SK5862204409; 52°38′03″N 1°08′07″W	1074810	National Westminster Bank
Newarke Houses Museum: Skeffington House	City of Leicester	House	c. 1600	5 January 1950	SK5836304116; 52°37′54″N 1°08′21″W	1361423	Newarke Houses Museum: Skeffington House
Newarke Wall (along north west end of gardens of Newarke Houses Museum)	City of Leicester	Boundary Wall	c. 1423	14 March 1975	SK5833204154; 52°37′55″N 1°08′22″W	1361054	Newarke Wall (along north west end of gardens of Newarke Houses Museum)
Old Grammar School	City of Leicester	Grammar School	Built 1573	5 January 1950	SK5836704607; 52°38′10″N 1°08′20″W	1361426	Old Grammar School More images
Parish Church of St Denys	Evington, City of Leicester	Church	Late 13th century to early-mid 14th century	5 January 1950	SK6275902766; 52°37′09″N 1°04′28″W	1200786	Parish Church of St Denys More images
Parish Church of St Peter	Belgrave, City of Leicester	Church	12th century	5 January 1950	SK5928607156; 52°39′32″N 1°07′30″W	1074029	Parish Church of St Peter More images
The Gate House, Leicester Castle	City of Leicester	Gatehouse	1445-59	5 January 1950	SK5826704207; 52°37′57″N 1°08′26″W	1200573	The Gate House, Leicester Castle
Tomb of Andrew Lord Rollo to the North East of St Margaret's Church	City of Leicester	Tomb	1765	16 May 1995	SK5857005123; 52°38′27″N 1°08′09″W	1250247	Tomb of Andrew Lord Rollo to the North East of St Margaret's Church More images
Leicester Town Hall	City of Leicester	Town Hall	1874-76	30 March 1972	SK5879504319; 52°38′00″N 1°07′58″W	1074780	Leicester Town Hall More images
Wyggeston House	City of Leicester	House	c. 1500	5 January 1950	SK5839604429; 52°38′04″N 1°08′19″W	1074008	Wyggeston House More images
17 Friar Lane	City of Leicester	House	18th century	5 January 1950	SK5859004319; 52°38′00″N 1°08′09″W	1183556	17 Friar Lane More images
21 St Martins	City of Leicester	House	Early 18th century	14 March 1975	SK5856904423; 52°38′04″N 1°08′10″W	1361022	21 St Martins More images
1, 2, 3 4–14 The Crescent	City of Leicester	House	c. 1810	5 January 1950	SK5892403857; 52°37′45″N 1°07′51″W	1074019	1, 2, 3 4–14 The Crescent

== See also ==
- Grade II* listed buildings in Leicestershire
- Grade I listed buildings in Leicester
