= Belgrave Hall =

Queen Anne-style Grade II* listed building in Belgrave

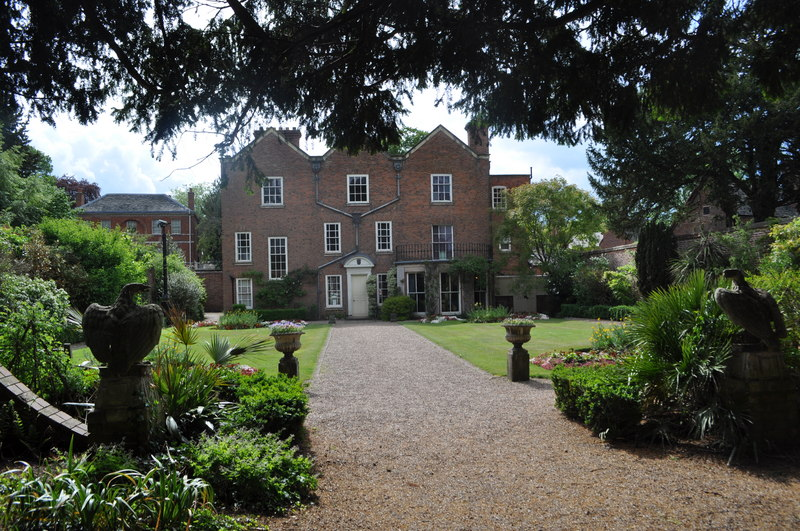
- Belgrave Hall: the garden front

- Location within Leicester

General information
- Status: Heritage venue
- Type: House
- Architectural style: Queen Anne-style
- Location: Church Road, Belgrave, Leicester, UK
- Coordinates: 52.6589°N 1.1249°W
- Construction started: 1709
- Completed: 1713
- Client: Edmund Cradock
- Owner: Leicester Museums

Listed Building – Grade II*
- Designated: 5 January 1950
- Reference no.: 1074030

Belgrave Hall is a Queen Anne-style Grade II* listed building in Belgrave, on the northern edge of Leicester, England. It was built between 1709 and 1713, being owned by various wealthy individuals including John Ellis and has received worldwide attention for its paranormal activity.

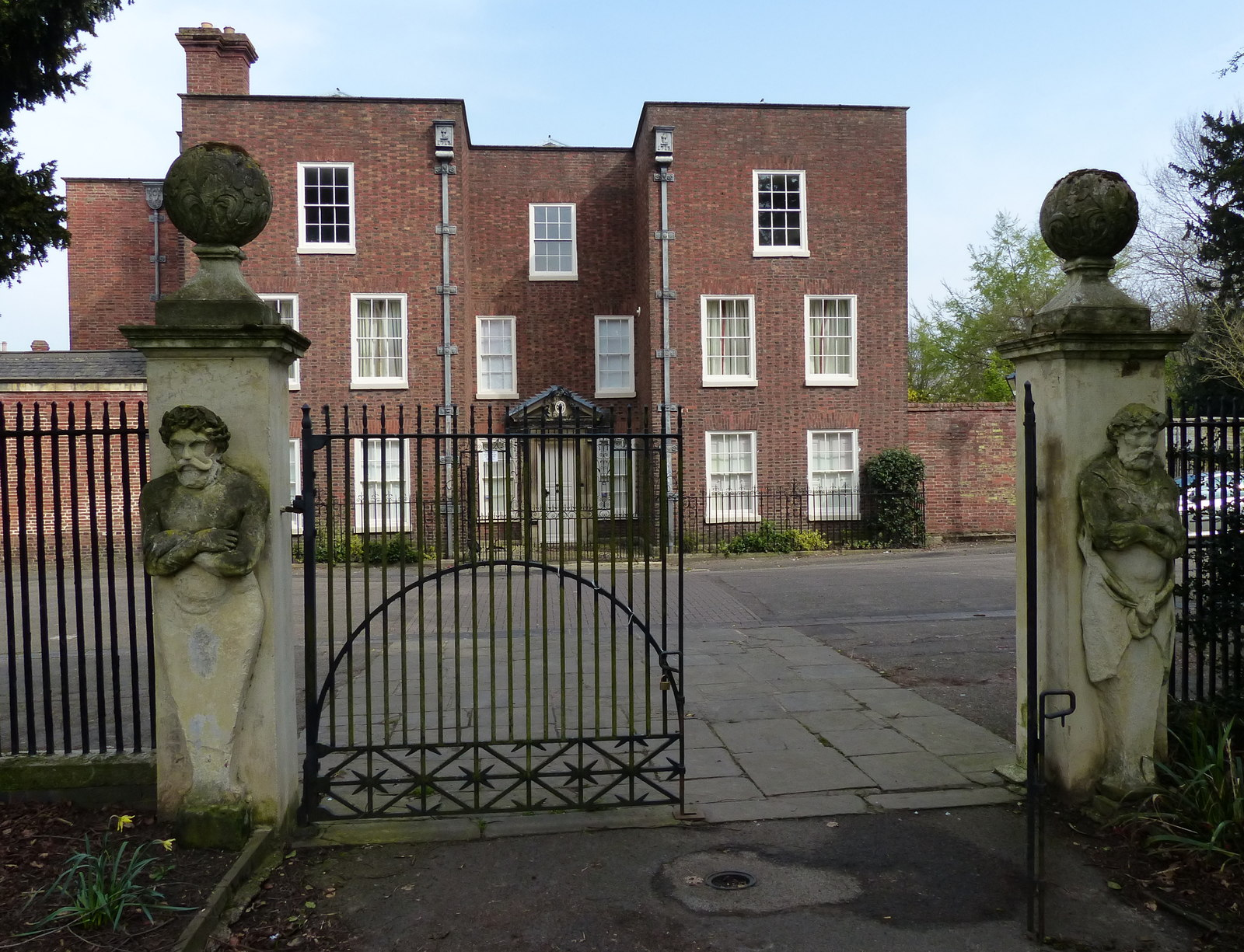
Belgrave Hall: the entrance front

== History ==
Belgrave Hall was built as a substantial family home between 1709 and 1713 by Edmund Cradock, a Leicester hosiery merchant on a site adjacent to St Peter’s Church. It was built in the midst of 2 acres (8,100 m^{2}) of walled gardens in Belgrave. Within two years of its completion both Edmund and his wife Anne died and the property underwent numerous changes in ownership. It was owned by the Simons family for 45 years, the Vann family for 78 years (during which time they also built the nearby Belgrave House), the Ellis family for 76 years and Thomas Morley for thirteen years. In 1936 it was bought by Leicester City Council, at which point it became a museum. The council has since decided to use the house and gardens as a heritage site rather than a museum and it is now only open at certain times during the summer months. It is also available for private functions such as weddings and ghost watches.

== Construction ==
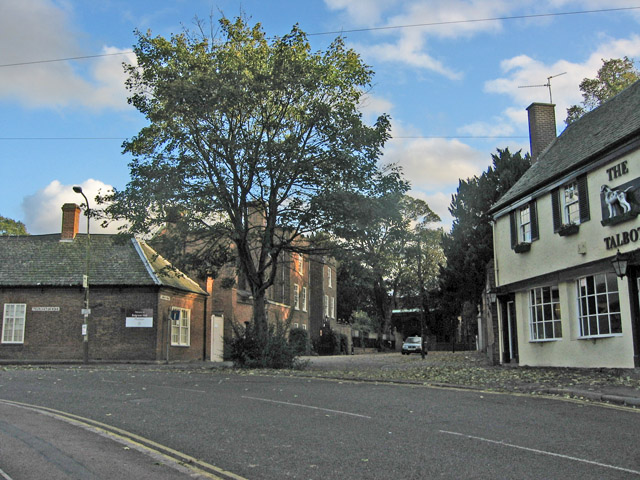
Belgrave, with Hall and Church in the distance

At the time of construction, Belgrave was a small village three miles from Leicester, between the roads to Loughborough and Lincoln. Belgrave Hall set a trend for wealthy businessmen to build themselves out-of-town houses in the area. The house, fronting onto Church Road, is a three-storey building in an unadorned classical style, from blue and red bricks, laid in Flemish bond, creating a chequered pattern. There are lead rainwater heads with the Cradock family crest, some of which have a 1709 date and others with 1713. This unusually long construction period, along with brickwork and ground-plan irregularities on the south side, may imply a re-design or halt to construction while building was underway. The road frontage has imposing wrought iron gates which incorporate an 'EC' monogram leading to a recessed doorway, and a brick parapet which hides the three hipped gables of the roof, creating a very rectangular facade.

== Cradock family ==
Edmund Cradock (cousin of Edmund Cradock of Knighton and nephew of Henry Hastings of Belgrave Old Hall) and his wife Anne are presumed to have moved into what was then known as "The Mansion House" by 1713. However, Edmund died while visiting Bath on 21 April 1715, two years after the house was completed. In accordance with his will, his married daughter Jane was to be given £1,000, and the remaining assets were to be divided equally between the two younger children, also called Anne and Edmund. Their mother received nothing from the will, and it is unknown how long she survived her husband. In order to begin distributing the assets of the estate the executors agreed the sale of the Mansion House in February 1716 for £1,350 to John Simons, who bought a further sixteen acres of land nearby the following year. There may have been a delay in the payment for these as an interest payment also became due. However, the beneficiaries were clearly disappointed with both the slowness and the amount realised by the estate. They had anticipated a total of some £5,000 including property and effects, but by the time debts and costs had been paid, there was not much left beyond the £1,000 left to Jane. In 1718-19 the actions of the executors were challenged by the younger daughter Anne and her new husband, James Holwell, who filed a petition to the Court of Chancery. The outcome of the case is not clear, but the Mansion House remained in the possession of John and Helen Simons.

== Simons family ==
John Simons had previously inherited the land opposite the hall, which at that time comprised orchards and paddocks running down to the River Soar. John and Helen had two sons. When John died in 1750, he had land and property elsewhere to leave to his elder son, Revd Nicholas Simons. The younger son, Nicholas, inherited the now extensive Belgrave Hall estate. However, within seven years Nicholas had mortgaged the property, and in 1757 he moved to Gumley. He let out Belgrave Hall to an old family friend, Sarah Boothby. In 1766 Sarah died, and, unable to make their mortgage repayments, Nicholas and his wife Elizabeth appeared in court. The result was that the Hall and lands were put up for sale, and were bought by William Southwell, a linen draper from Nottingham. Along with his brother-in-law, William Vann, they based their framework knitting business at the Hall, utilising the substantial outhouses for warehousing and office space.

== Vann family: hall and house ==
William Southwell died in 1767, leaving Belgrave Hall to two of the Vann sons, his nephews William and Richard, who with their younger brother James Vann lived in the Hall and were partners in the Belgrave-based hosiery business. In 1776, William, the eldest son, built himself a new house on the other side of the road from the Hall, named Belgrave House. It was built in a 'sleek, classical style', and is a Grade II* listed building. The gardens on that side of Church Road were divided between the two properties.

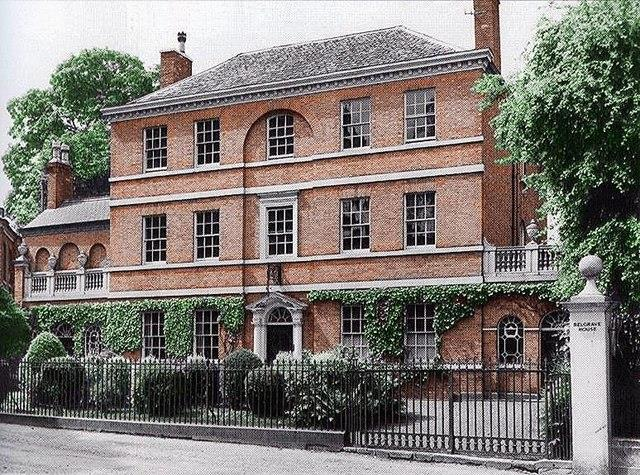
Belgrave House

William became High Sheriff of Leicestershire for the year 1785 and died in 1794. Richard and James continued in the Hall, and when Richard died unmarried in 1796, the Hall and his half of the estate passed to James. In the previous year James had married Hannah Clayton (daughter of John Clayton, MA, Vicar of Belgrave 1759–1796), he then aged 49 and she 38. In 1803 James, like his brother William, served a year as High Sheriff of Leicestershire. None of the brothers had any children. James died in 1812, and by his will left the Hall and estate to his wife Hannah for her lifetime, and then to his cousin, Ann Hunt. Hannah survived her husband by 32 years and died in 1844, by which time Ann Marston was dead. Ann had, long before, married into the Marston family of Enderby. She was survived by her Marston descendants; and therefore the Belgrave Estate, which had by then become heavily mortgaged, passed to Anne's heirs and was sold by them in 1845 to John Ellis, a railway entrepreneur.

== John Ellis and daughters ==
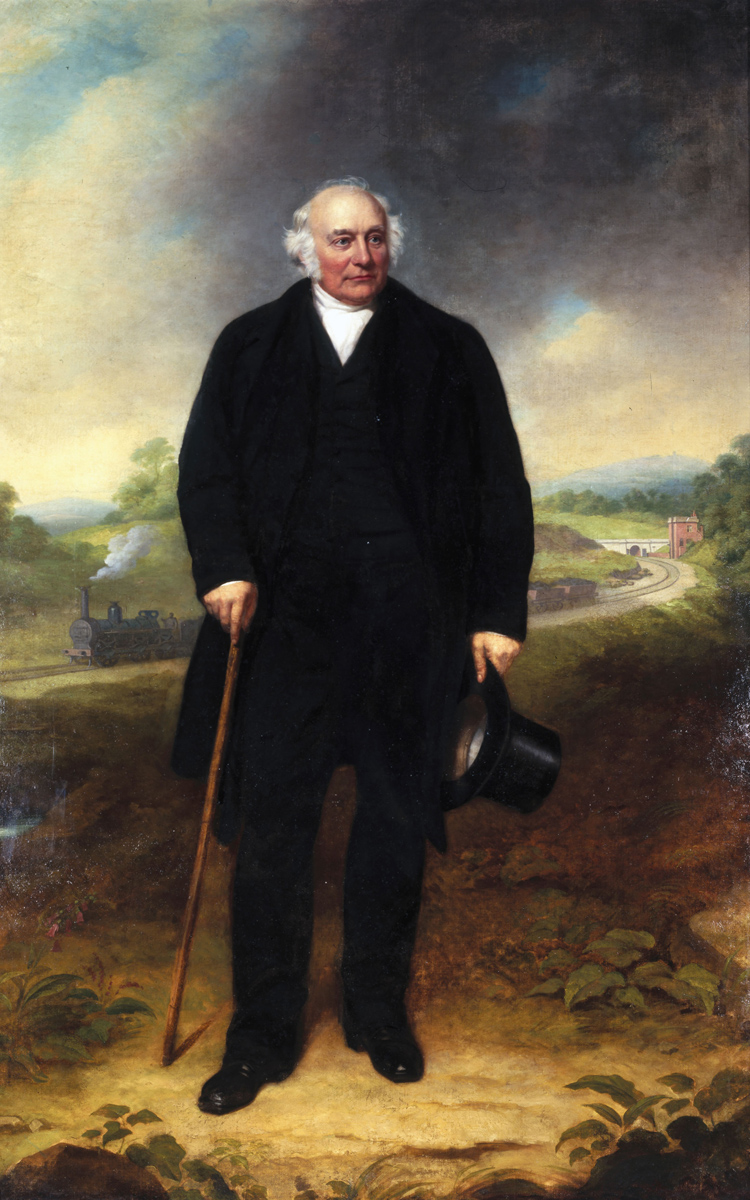
John Ellis by John Lucas

John Ellis took possession of Belgrave Hall in 1847, when he was 58, with a wife and seven daughters. By the time he moved from Beaumont Leys to the Hall, he was one of Leicester's most prominent figures. Having moved to his elegant 140-year-old house, he continued both his railway and public life roles.

In 1828 he had met George Stephenson, who having completed the Stockton and Darlington Railway, was working on the Liverpool and Manchester Railway. Ellis was a key figure in getting the Stephensons to take on the building of a line from Leicester to the Swannington coalfields, which was completed in 1833.

He was a Quaker and reformer, and in 1836 Ellis had become a Town Councillor. In 1840 he had attended the World's Anti-Slavery Convention. By 1845, as a director of the Midland Railway, he had overseen the merger with the Birmingham and Gloucester Railway. In 1849 he became chairman of the Midland Railway and represented Leicester in Parliament between 1848 and 1852.

John Ellis died in 1862, and his wife and five of his daughters stayed on at Belgrave Hall. The "Belgrave sisters" played a leading role in various Leicester institutions and hosted literary and social events at the Hall. They supported the suffragette movement, and Charlotte Ellis was on the 'Leicester Board of Guardians' for nine years. She administered the town's poor law relief from 1892, alongside two other pioneer women guardians, Fanny Fullagar and Mary Royce.

The sisters valued the gardens and grounds. Recalling their arrival, Gertrude wrote, 'The east side of the house was festooned by an enormous vine, and a few weeks later the flowers that haunt old gardens began to appear. Some of these may have been blooming for a hundred years and still as each spring returns, renew their life! The daffodils amongst the paddock grass, the lungwort, the peonies, and the great orange lilies…' . In 1889 they bought the meadowland that had gone with Belgrave House, re-establishing the parkland beside the river, and established a woodland garden. A cousin recalled how, when visiting the sisters, they would seek out "..the boat house down by the river. Here one might be thrilled by discovering a tiny room with fireplace all complete, used by the literary sister as a study." Towards the end of her life, Gertrude wrote, "For more than sixty years the Belgrave garden gave a very special kind of pleasure to all those connected with the Belgrave home, and the memory of it is still fair and fragrant." At Margaret's funeral in 1923, the sisters were described as, "public spirited citizens, beloved and looked up to in Belgrave and Leicester. Their home was one of culture and refinement. Their outlook on the world was wide" . Margaret, the last of the daughters, died in 1923, 76 years after they arrived.

== Museum ==
After Margaret's death the Hall was sold to Thomas Morley, a Leicester hosiery manufacturer. In 1936 it was sold again for £10,500 to the Corporation of Leicester, who opened it as a museum and public gardens. The museum was furnished to present a moderately well-to-do eighteenth and early-nineteenth century household. The furniture came from a wide variety of sources, some of it, such as the lion-mask chairs and settee in the Drawing Room, from much grander settings than this. A refit in 2005 added more details about the servants quarters and shows the contrasting lifestyles of an upper-middle-class family and domestic servants in Victorian society.

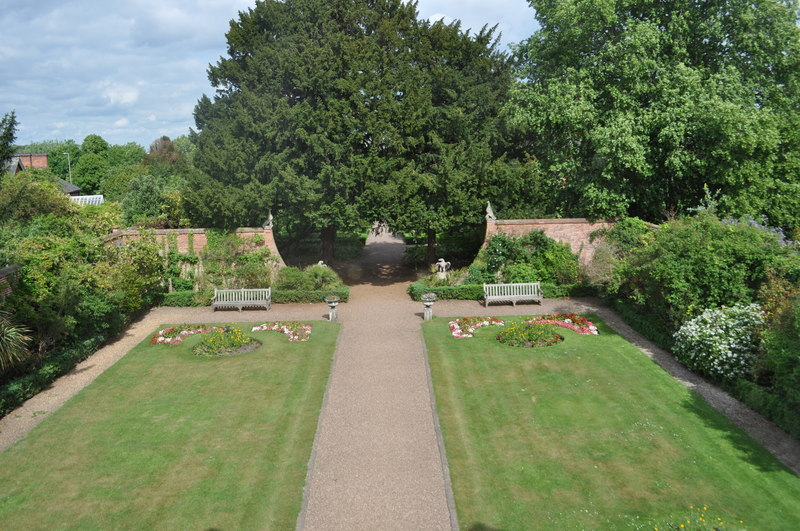
Part of the Gardens, seen from the Hall

On the opposite side of the road is the parkland running down to the river. This was at various times the gardens for Belgrave Hall and Belgrave House, but is now known as Belgrave Gardens and is open to the public. Two acres of gardens at the back of the Hall are open to public on Wednesdays and first full weekend of every month during summer season, which runs from April to September. These retain features first laid out by John Ellis in 1850, with formal garden features, walled kitchen gardens and glass houses. Former outbuildings have been converted to a small "craft village" of six workshop units. The formal gardens now also contain statues and monuments from 'lost' Leicestershire Gardens, such as the memorial to Edward Holdsworth from Gopsall hall.

== Statues ==
Four statues remain from an original collection of sixteen that were bought by the Vanns sometime before 1790. These appear to have been a diverse collection of mythological subjects bought in Italy by Colonel Hewitt of Stretton Hall, and bought from his estate by the Vanns. They were described by John Throsby in his Leicestershire Views as being "Pomona; Diana; Flora; Ceres; Hercules; Venus; a Satyr; a Turk and his consort; two Emperors and a Pope". Hannah Vann's will, at her death in 1842, notes the statues as items she hoped could stay in the family. Twelve appear to have been taken to Enderby by her heirs, where they were locally known as the "Twelve Apostles", but have since been dispersed and mostly not been traced. Of the four that remain, perhaps because they were larger and less easily moved, two are in the formal gardens, and may be Throsby's "Ceres" and "Hercules". The other two stand inside what were once the gates to Belgrave House, now part of Belgrave Gardens, and are both statues of the Greek god Telamon, but may be what Throsby describes as the two Emperors.

== Paranormal and media coverage ==
In 1999 staff at Belgrave Hall reported the recording of two ghostly figures on security cameras outside the hall. The ISPR (International Society for Paranormal Research) examined the footage and decided the image was environmental in nature rather than paranormal, namely a falling leaf, but went on to "identify" quite a few cold spots and "residual forces". A DVD, The ISPR Investigates Ghosts of Belgrave Hall was released. The building remained of interest to ghost hunters long after this sighting was explained. The team from Ghost Hunters International concluded it was most likely people with reflective jackets walking around. Living TV's Most Haunted crew investigated here in 2003 with celebrity guests Vic Reeves and his wife Nancy Sorrell. Belgrave Hall was featured on the 26 June 2012 episode of Fact or Faked: Paranormal Files.

== See also ==
- Grade II* listed buildings in Leicester
- List of museums in Leicestershire
- Abbey Pumping Station, Leicester's Museum of Science and Technology (1 km to south)
- National Space Centre, space and aerospace museum (1 km to south)
