= Leicester Corn Exchange =

Municipal building in Leicester, England

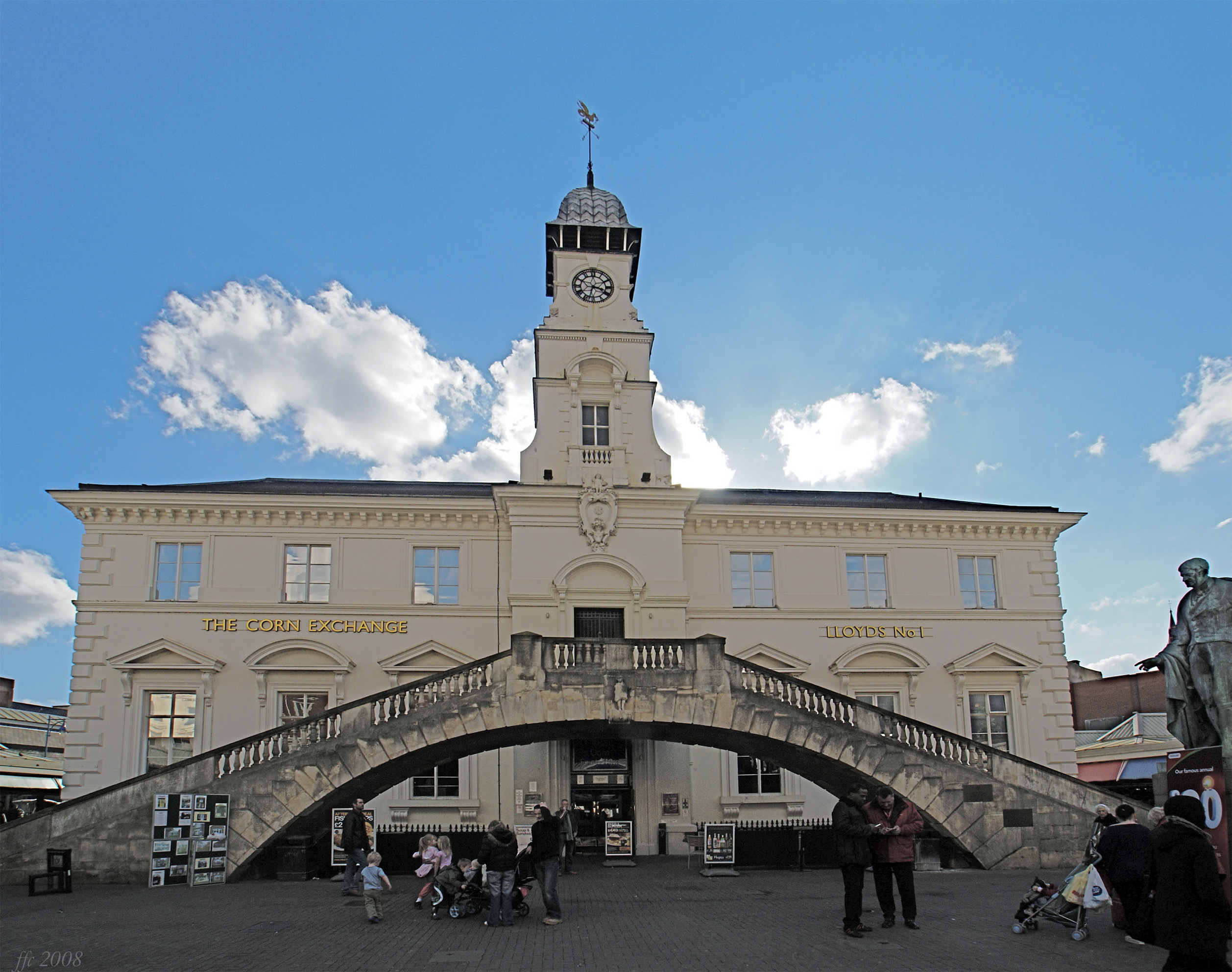
- Leicester Corn Exchange

- Shown in Leicestershire
- 52.6345°N 1.1333°W
- Location: Market Place, Leicester

History
- Built: 1855

Site notes
- Architect(s): William Flint and Frederick Webster Ordish
- Architectural style: Neoclassical style

Listed Building – Grade II*
- Official name: Corn Exchange
- Designated: 5 January 1950
- Reference no.: 1361417

Leicester Corn Exchange is a commercial building in the Market Place in Leicester, Leicestershire, England. The structure, which currently operates as a public house, is a grade II* listed building.

== History ==
The first building on the site, known as The Gainsborough, which was built as a prison and law court with shops and dungeons below, was completed in 1509. It was replaced by another building, known as the New Gainsborough, which was built as a corn exchange, in 1748. The first floor of the building was used for magistrates' court hearings. The current building was originally commissioned as a single-storey market trading hall. It was designed by William Flint and completed in 1851. However, it was then extended by the addition of an extra floor to accommodate magistrates' court hearings, to a design by Frederick Webster Ordish in the neoclassical style, in brick with a stucco finish, in 1855.

The design involved a symmetrical main frontage of seven bays facing onto the Market Place. It featured a prominent stone archway supporting a double-flight staircase providing access to a doorway on the first floor in the piano nobile-style. The first floor doorway was surmounted by a segmental pediment and a cartouche. The wings were fenestrated by tall windows with window sills, architraves and alternating segmental and triangular pediments on the ground floor, and by square-shaped windows on the first floor. At roof level, there was a modillioned cornice. A clock turret was also added, housing a clock by E. T. Loseby of Leicester and topped by a weather vane in the shape of a wyvern. The architectural historian, Nikolaus Pevsner, described the staircase as "spectacular", although Ordish had his doubts about it and later disowned it.

A statue of the Lord Lieutenant of Leicestershire, John Manners, 5th Duke of Rutland, sculpted by Edward Davis, was unveiled outside the building by Sir Frederick Gustavus Fowke, 1st Baronet on 28 April 1852.

The use of the building as a corn exchange declined significantly in the wake of the Great Depression of British Agriculture in the late 19th century. However, in the early 20th century, the building served as a focal point for civic celebrations and, in June 1911, a large crowd attended celebrations to mark the Coronation of George V and Mary. Then, in August 1914, at the start of the First World War, the building was the venue for a lively debate involving the future Prime Minister, Ramsay MacDonald, who spoke on the importance of democracy and overcoming militarism.

After a long period when the building was vacant and deteriorating, it was acquired by Wetherspoons and, after a major refurbishment, it re-opened as a public house in July 2000.

== See also ==
- Grade II* listed buildings in Leicester
- Corn exchanges in England
