= Belgrave House =

Adam-style Grade II* listed building in Belgrave

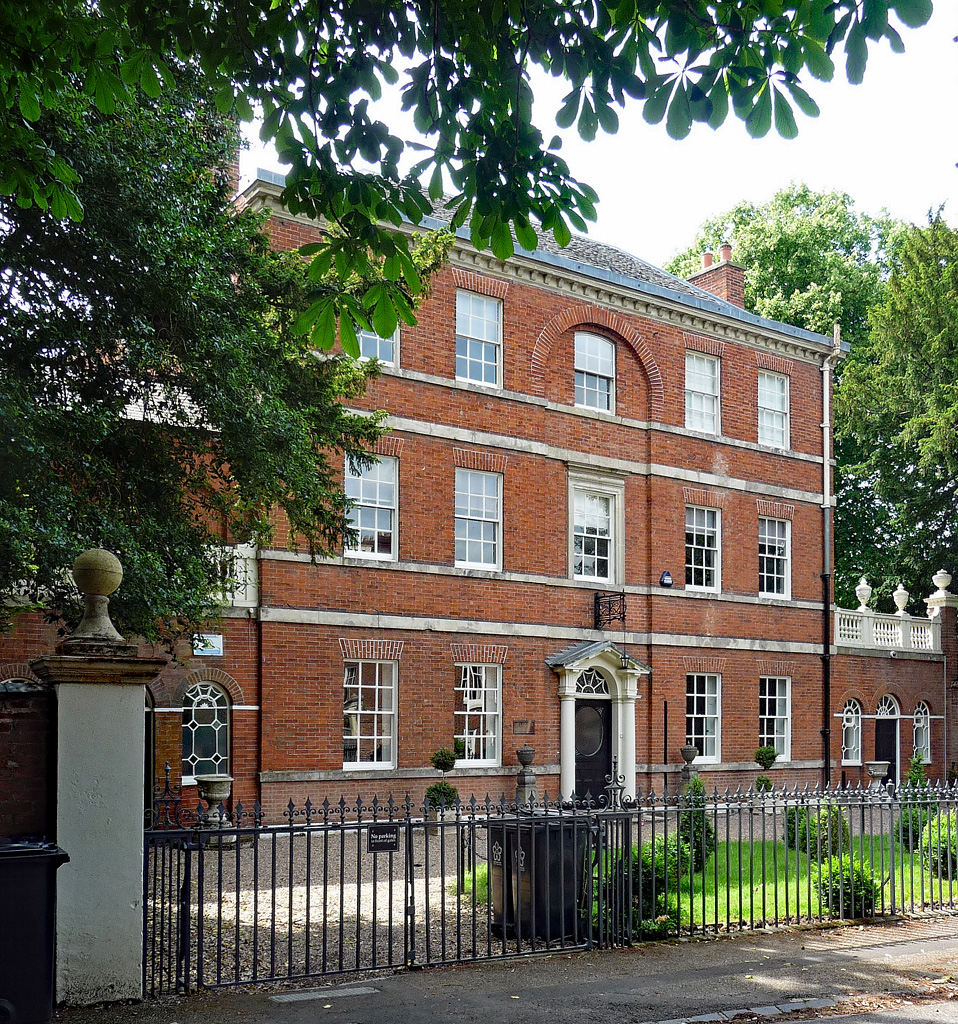
- Interactive map of the Belgrave House area

General information
- Type: House
- Location: Church Road, Belgrave, Leicester, UK
- Coordinates: 52°39′33″N 1°07′32″W

Listed Building – Grade II*
- Designated: 5 January 1950
- Reference no.: 1074033

Belgrave House is an Adam-style Grade II* listed building in Belgrave, Leicester, built in a 'sleek, classical style' in 1776. It was built by William Vann, who became High Sheriff of Leicestershire in 1785. The house went up for sale in the modern day, in the 21st century, at £850,000.

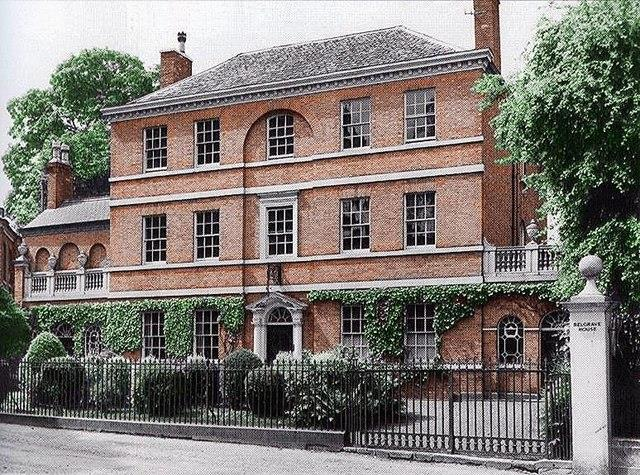
Belgrave House
