= St Andrew's Church, Leicester =

Church in England

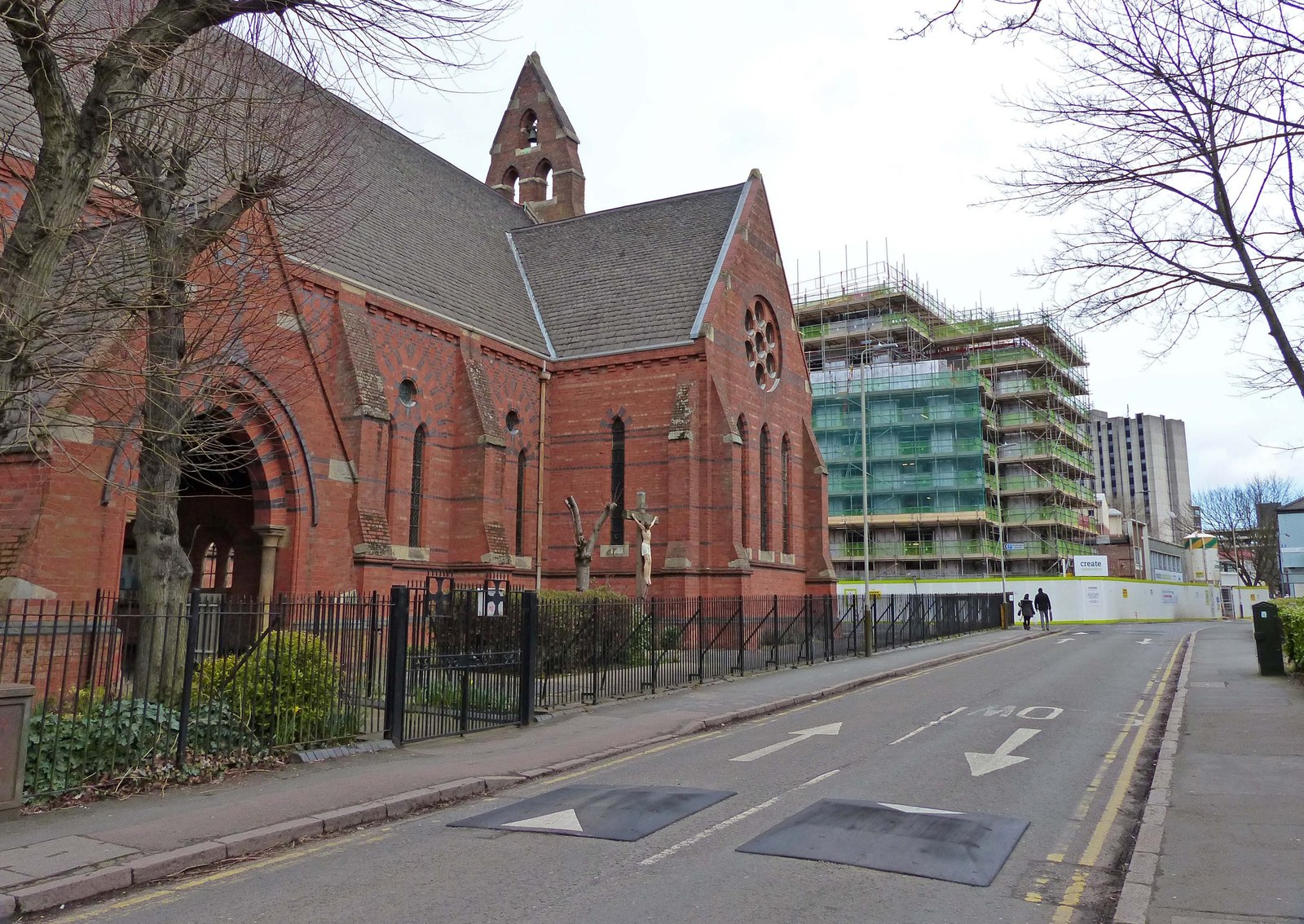
- St Andrew's Church in 2015

Religion
- Affiliation: Anglo-Catholicism
- Ecclesiastical or organisational status: active

Location
- Location: Jarrom Street, Leicester, Leicestershire, England
- Interactive map of St Andrew's Church, Leicester
- Coordinates: 52.6281°N 1.13771°W

Architecture
- Architect: George Gilbert Scott
- Type: Church
- Style: Gothic Revival
- Completed: 1862

Website
- www.standrewsjarromstreet.org

The St Andrew's Church is a Victorian church in Leicester, England. It is associated with Anglo-Catholicism and is part of the Diocese of Leicester.

== History ==
The church was constructed from 1860 to 1862 to designs by George Gilbert Scott.

On 28 July 2026, a large fire was reported at the church. Multiple fire engines were called to the scene. A coffin, containing the body of a church warden in preparation of funeral arrangements, was rescued from the fire. According to Leicestershire Fire and Rescue Service, the roof suffered severe damage. Investigators suspected an accidental fire.

The following Sunday services resumed at the church hall. A collection of artefacts dating back to the 1880s were salvaged from the church. Pope Leo XIV sent a letter of support from the Vatican to the church following the fire.

== See also ==
- Grade II* listed buildings in Leicester
- List of Anglo-Catholic churches in England
- List of works by George Gilbert Scott
