= ISKCON Temple, Leicester =

Radha Krishna Temple in Leicester, UK

ISKCON Leicester
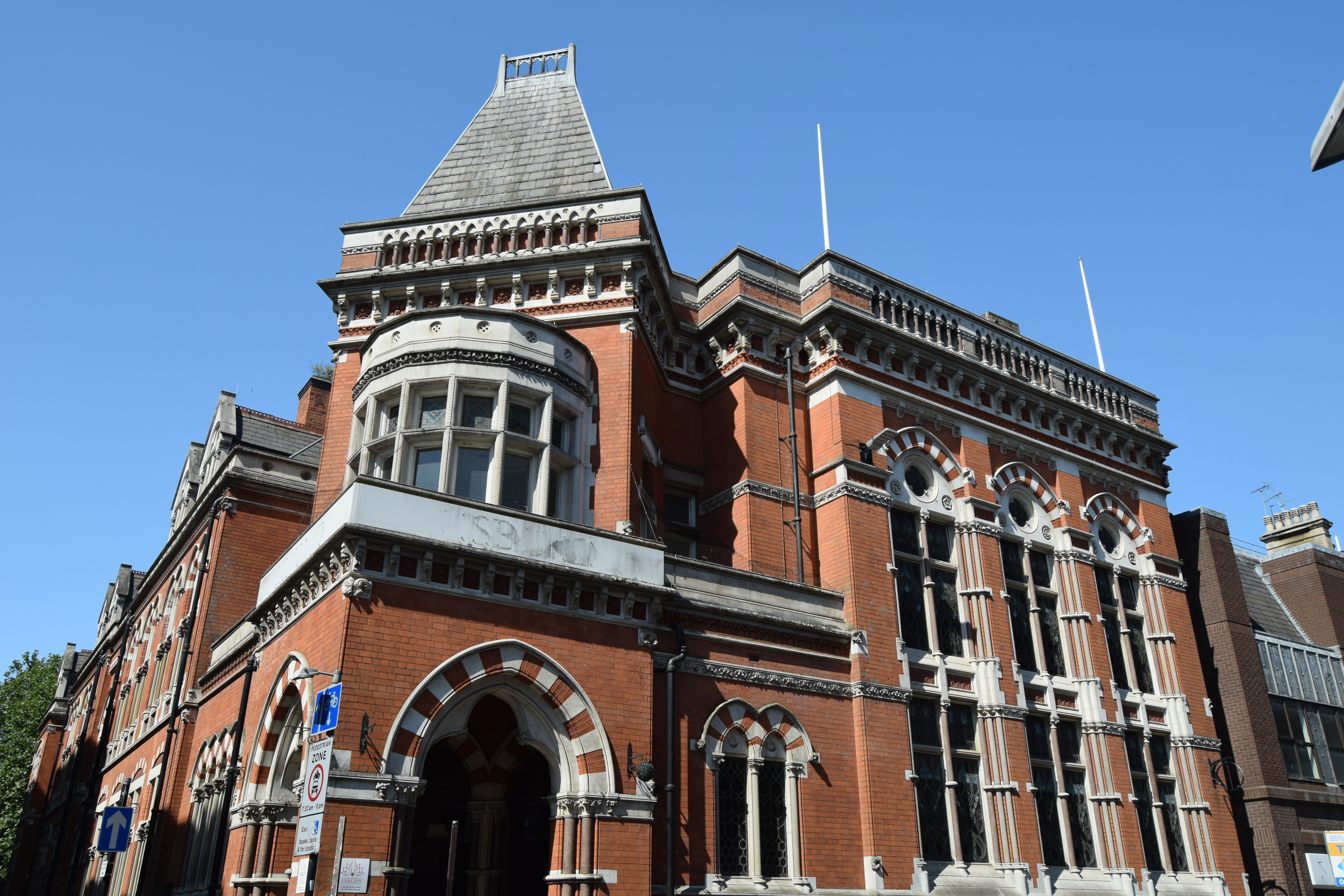
- Northeast elevation of temple, featuring the main entrance and stained-glass façade.

- Location within Leicester

Religion
- Affiliation: Hinduism, Gaudiya Vaishnavism
- Deity: Radha Krishna
- Governing body: International Society for Krishna Consciousness

Location
- Location: 31 Granby Street, Leicester
- Country: United Kingdom
- Coordinates: 52°38′2″N 1°7′51″W

Architecture
- Architect: Joseph Goddard
- Style: Victorian Gothic
- Completed: 1874

Website
- https://www.iskconleicester.org/

ISKCON Leicester is a Hare Krishna temple located in central Leicester, in the East Midlands region of England. The temple is one of sixteen religious and cultural centers run by the International Society for Krishna Consciousness (ISKCON) in the United Kingdom. The temple follows the Krishnaism or Krishna-centric traditions of the Gaudiya Vaishnava denomination within Hinduism. Their philosophy is based on Sanskrit texts known as the Bhagavad Gita (The Song of God) and the Bhagavat Purana. Unlike some forms of Hinduism, the Gaudiya Vaishnava tradition is monotheistic and worship Krishna as the highest form of God and the source of all the avatars of God.

== ISKCON in Leicester ==
In the late 1960s, ISKCON established its regional headquarters in London and a temple in Leicester along Belgrave Road in the 1980s. As the community grew, the organization shifted to 21 Thoresby Street in North Evington. The temple remained there until September 2010, when a gas explosion destroyed a third of the building. At the time, a religious celebration was taking place when someone improperly disconnected a gas cylinder used for cooking. A devotee noticed the gas leak and quickly evacuated the occupants moments before the explosion. While the unstable building could not be saved, many of the religious relics were left untouched by the devastation.

Prior to the explosion, the Thoresby building served as the temple, community center, and housing for the spiritual teachers. After the explosion, the organization would hold its religious events throughout Leicester at various community centers. After temporarily settling at the East-West Center, the organization sought a more permanent home to support its growing community.

In November 2010, the organization became interested in the old HSBC bank located on Granby Street. The property's central location and 15,000 square feet of space offered the temple room to grow and establish itself as a cornerstone of the community. After being on the market for five years, the bank accepted the organization's original offer of £750,000 in May 2011. During the purchase process, the organization learned that the building was declared a Grade II listed building and required major renovations for the roof, heating, and lighting systems. Along with 11 others building in Leicestershire, English Heritage added the building to a national 'at risk' list, stating that the former HSBC bank in Granby Street desperately needs repairs to save it from falling into ruin. With an estimated renovation cost of two million pounds, the community renegotiated the purchase price to £350,000 with the promise of restoring the historic structure. Funding for the building's purchase was donated to the organization by a London-based family.

ISKCON completed the first and second-floor renovations in 2016 and inaugurated the temple in August 2016 with the installation of Srila Prabhupada's murti. The first floor includes the main temple room that can host up to 250 guests, offices, two classrooms for the College of Vedic Studies, and an onsite kitchen to produce vegetarian food. Further renovations will add a restaurant, library, and exhibition area to the rear half of the building.

== Architecture ==
Joseph Goddard designed the Victorian Gothic structure in 1872 for the Leicestershire Banking Company. The company was a financer of major industries in Leicester and solicited proposals from local architects for a new expansion. Joseph Goddard belonged to a prominent family of architects and played a major role in introducing Victorian gothic architecture to Leicester with his clock tower design. Completed in 1874 at the cost of £7,439, the bank contrasted the classical designs of the other buildings with its corner porch, French pavilion roofs, and two-story-tall stained-glass façade. Similarly spectacular, the bank's interior featured enormous hammer beams that formed a lantern roof giving the building a lofty and imposing atmosphere. The hand-carved pillars incorporated friezes and coat of arms representing cities where the company did business. The project's success earned Goddard multiple commissions for new banks throughout the East Midland region. The newer banks highlight his shift towards a more restrained domestic revival and Queen Ann style. Many of his buildings are still in use and listed as historic structures by English Heritage.

== Gallery ==
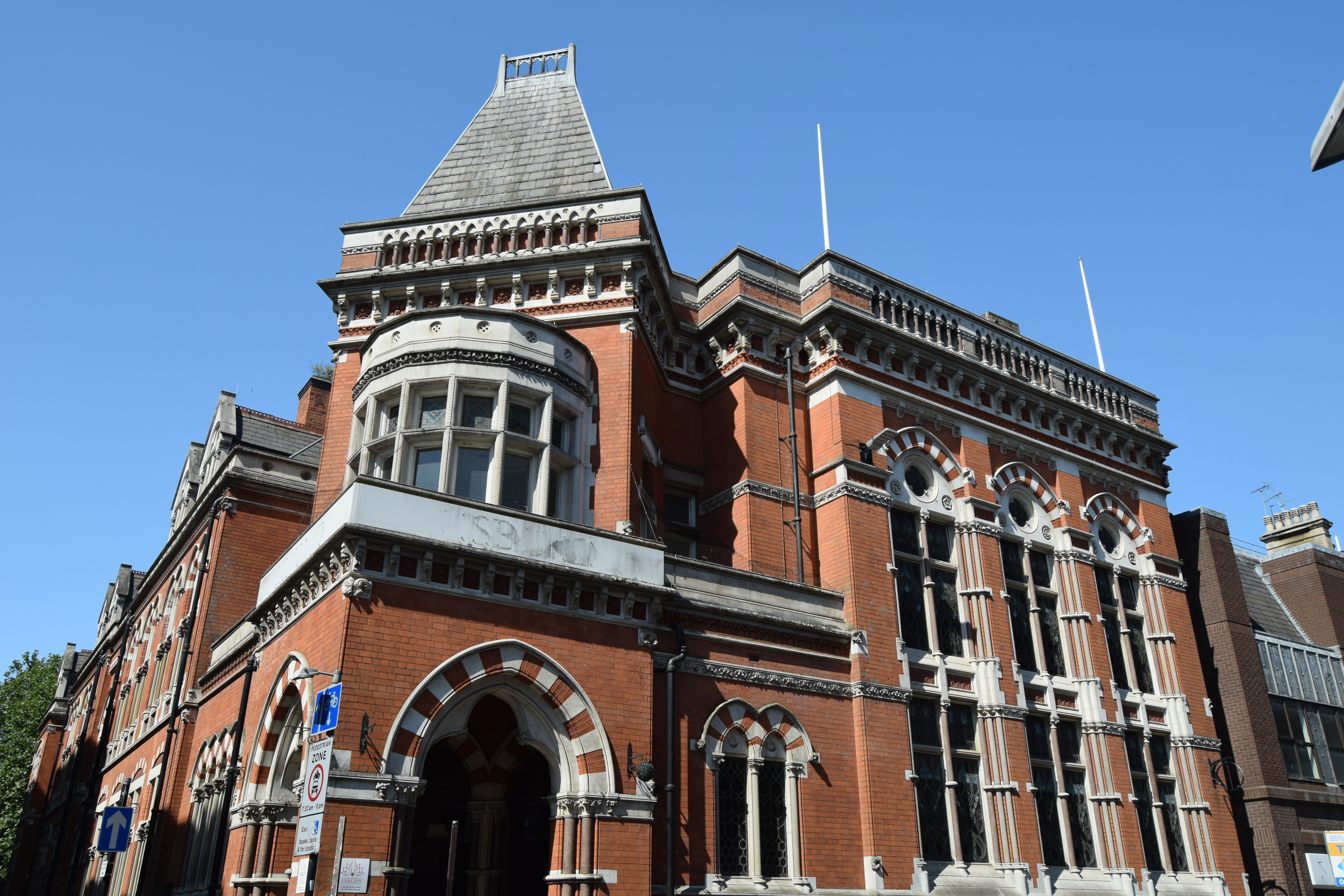

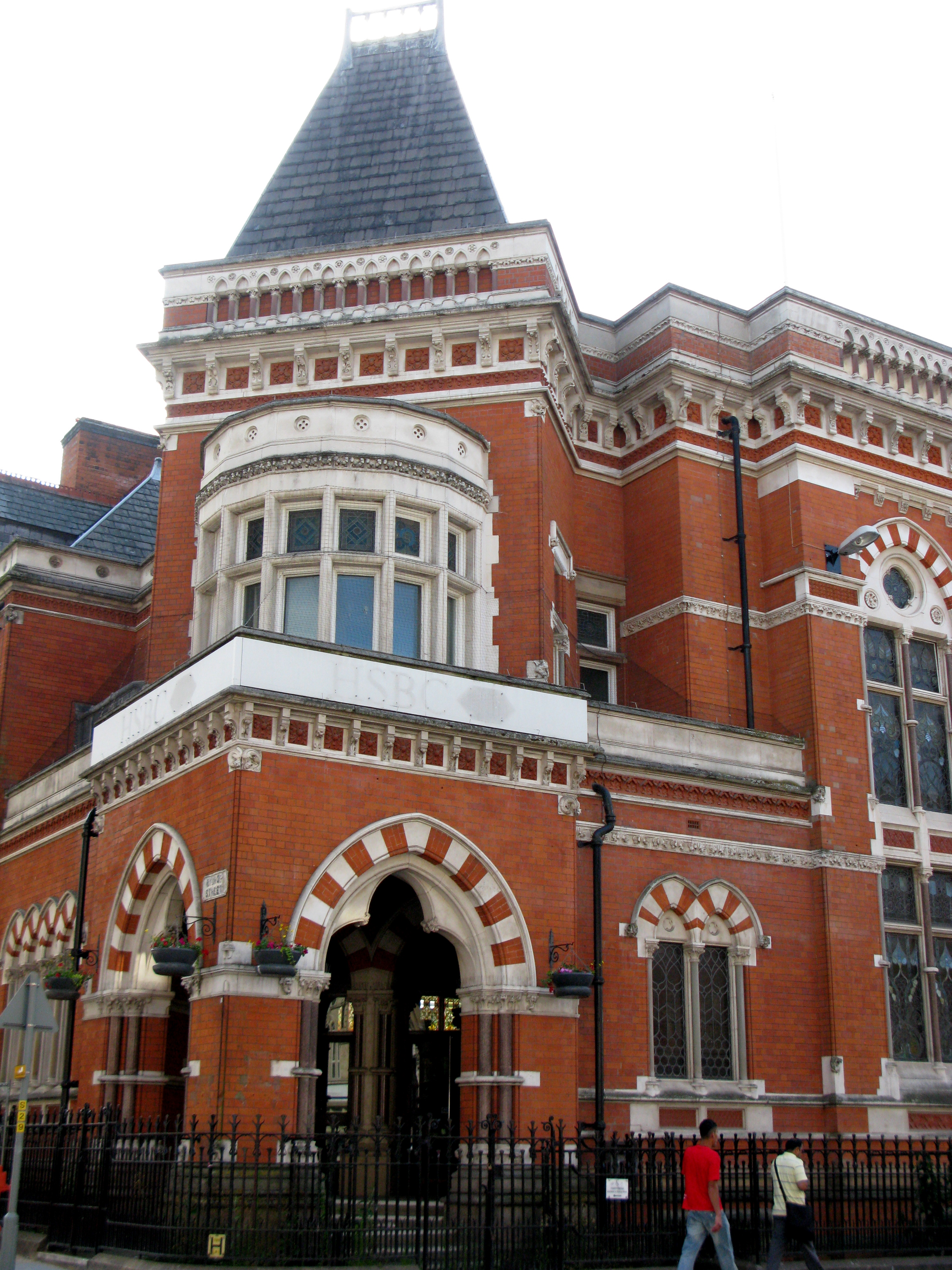

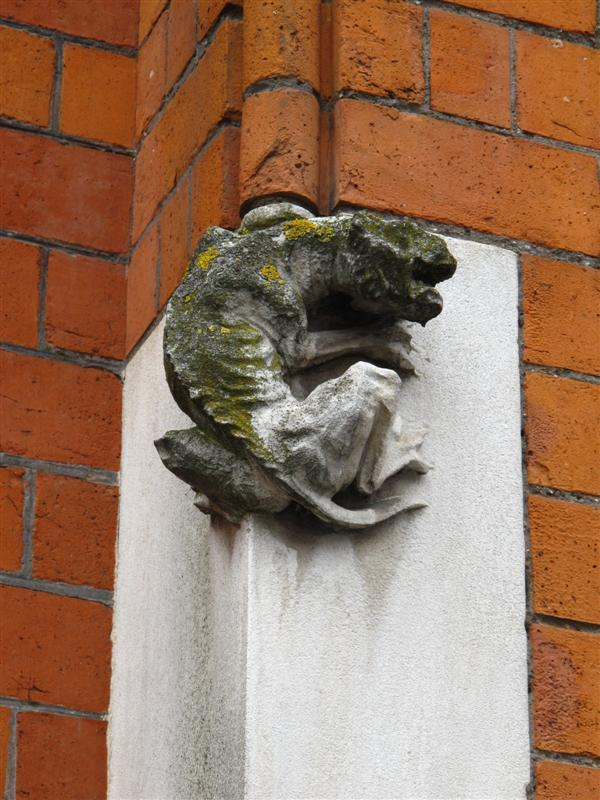

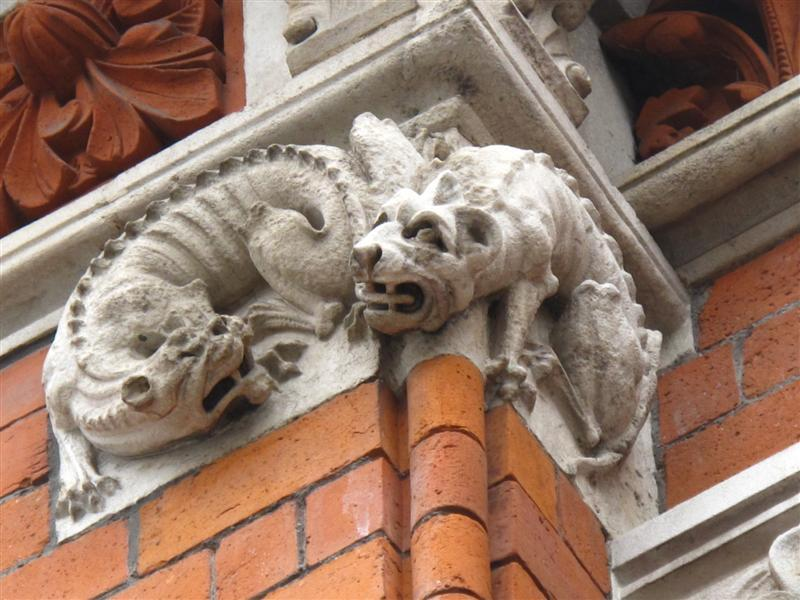

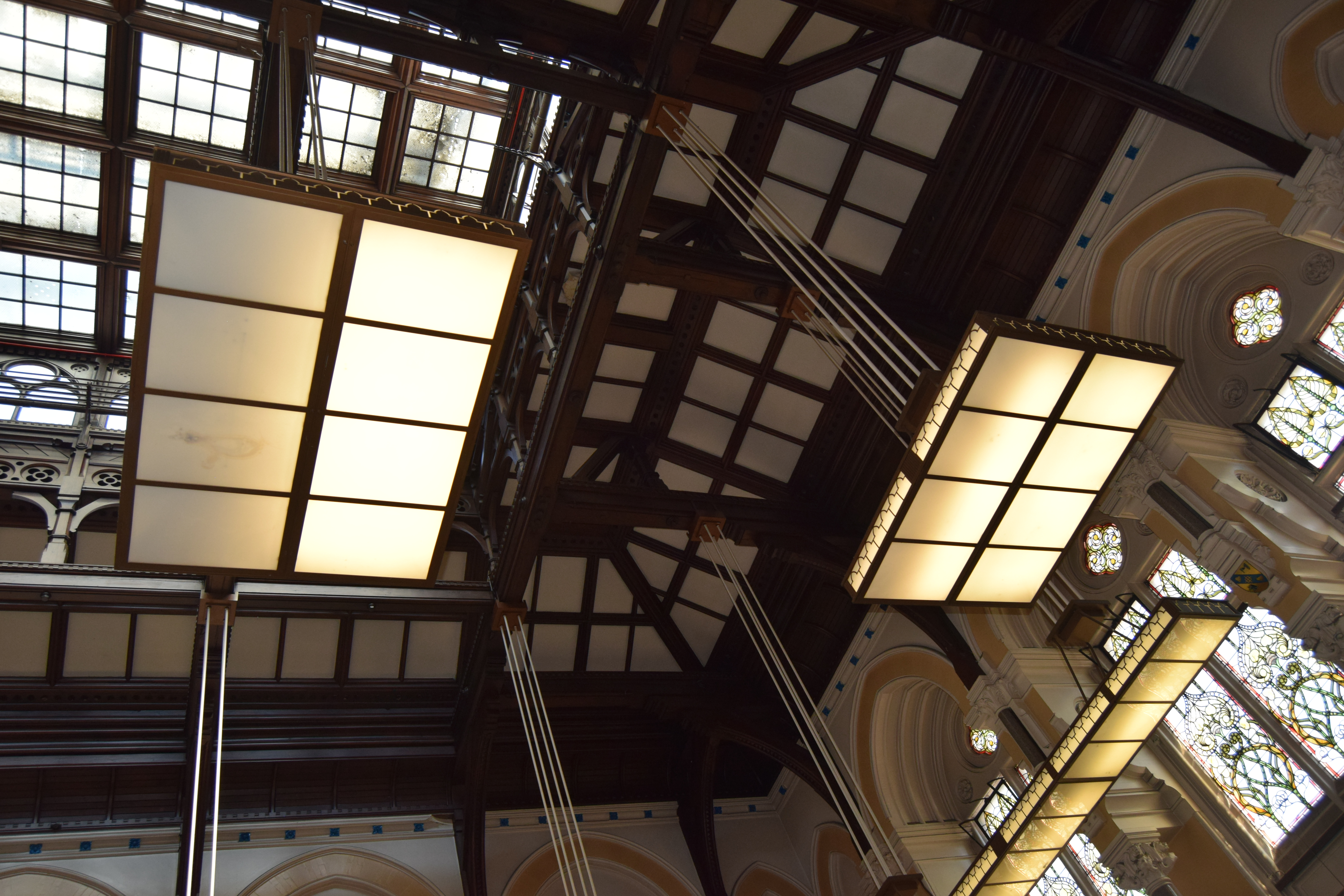

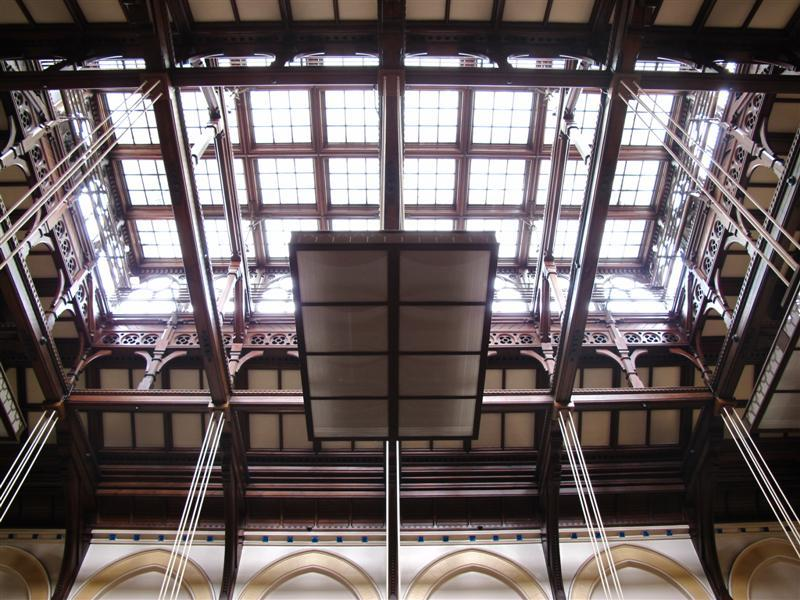

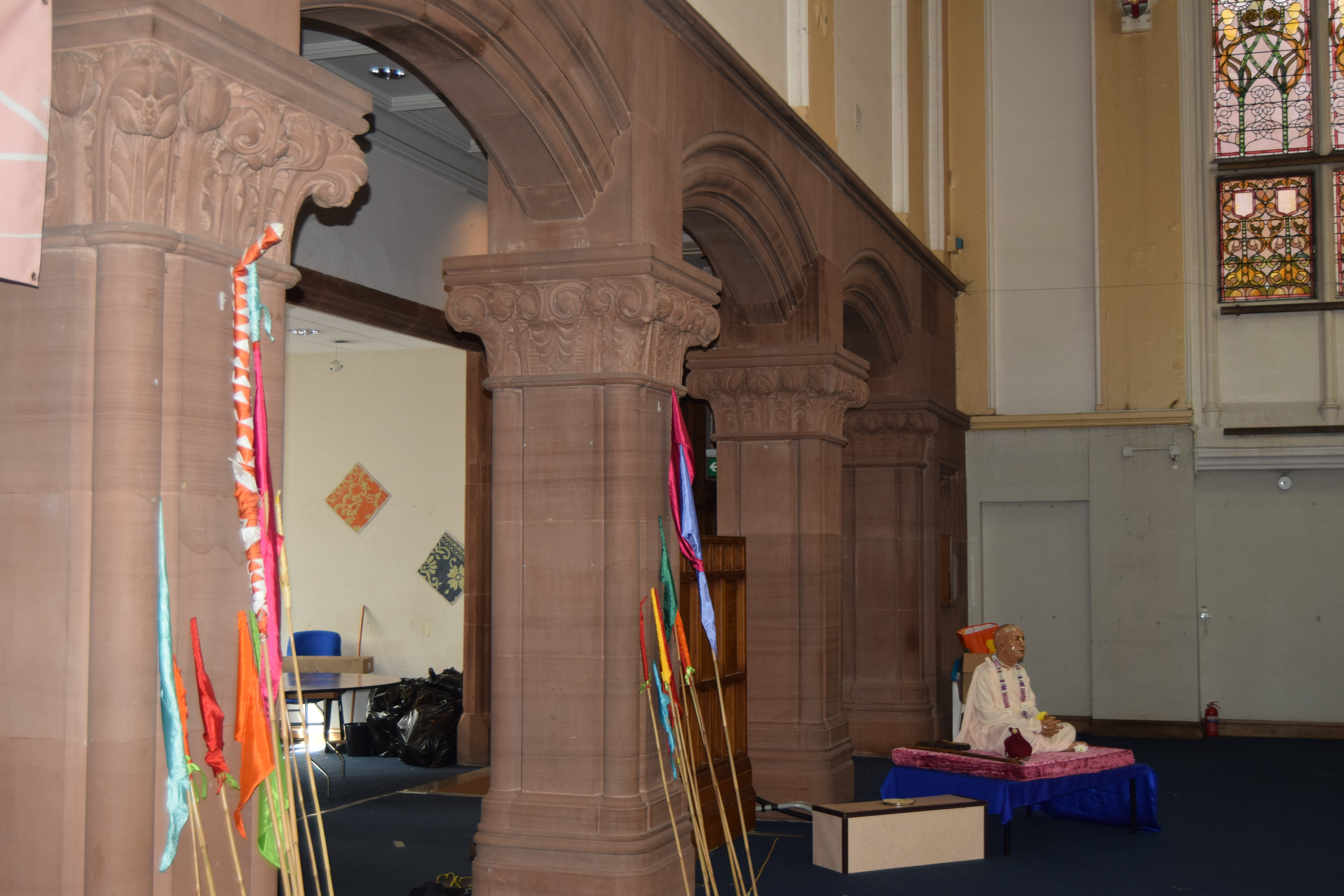

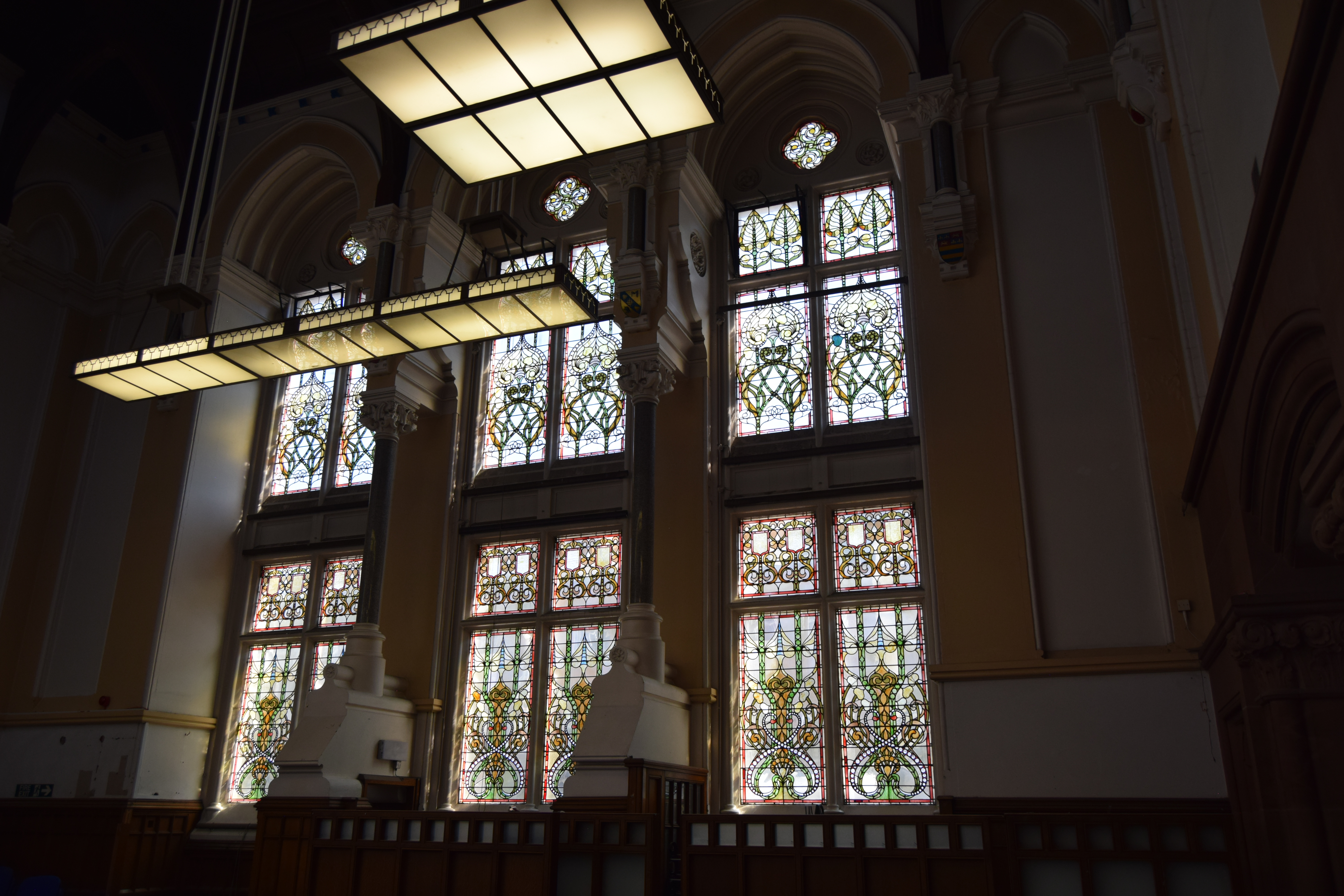

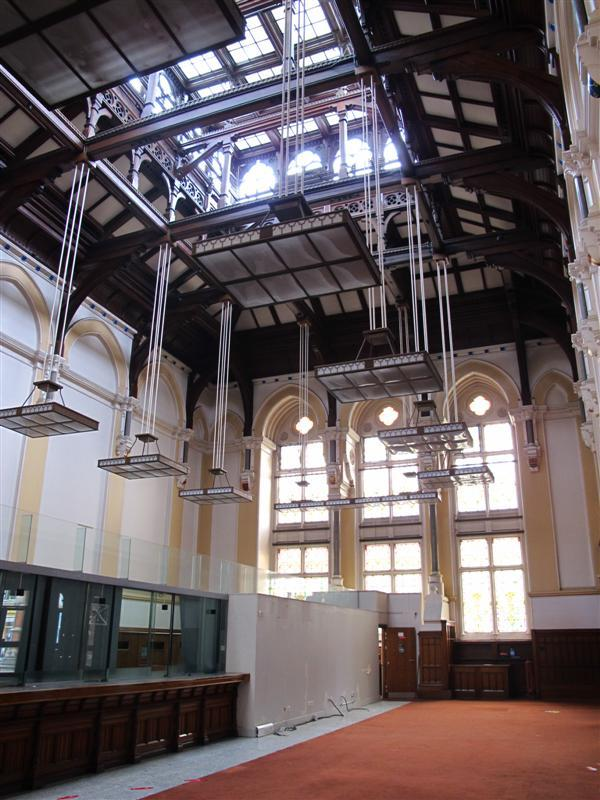

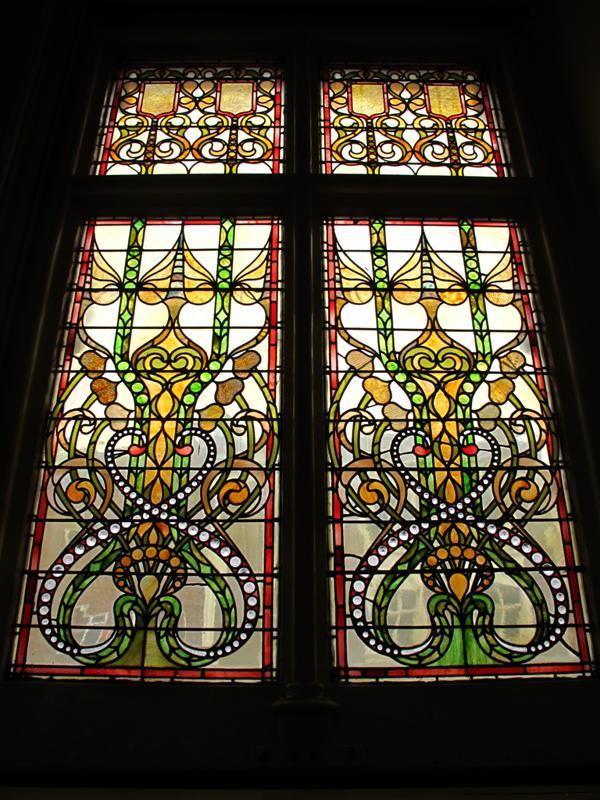
