= St Andrew's Church, Aylestone =

Church in Aylestone, Leicestershire

Coordinates: 52°36′14″N 1°09′25″W

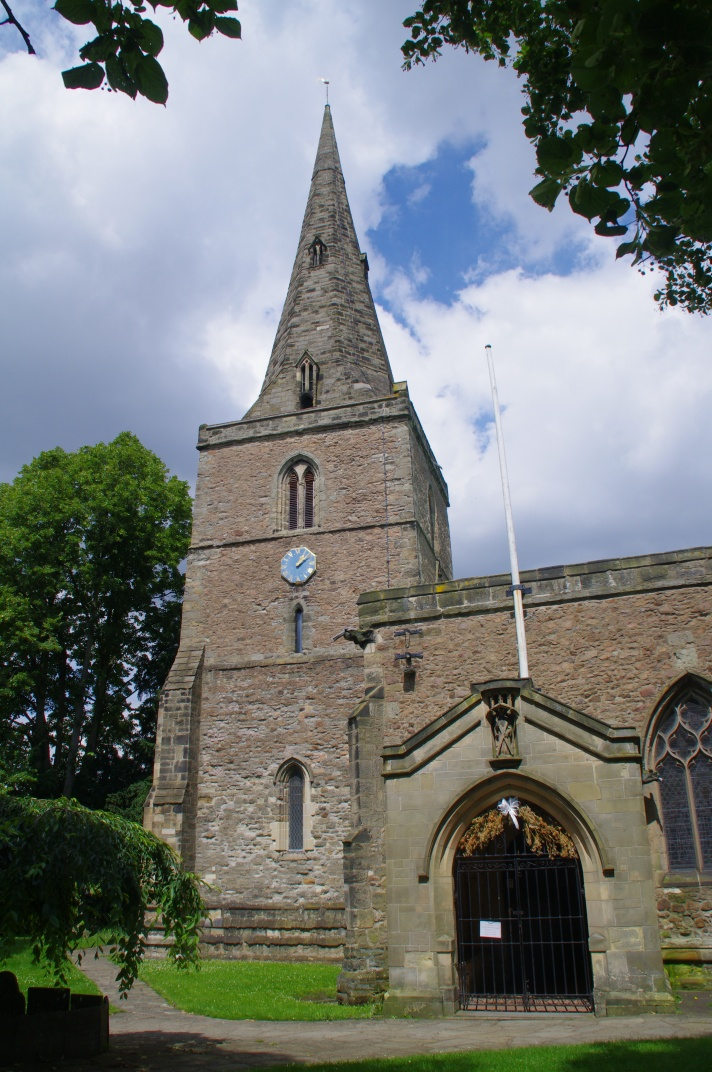
- Denomination: Church of England

History
- Dedication: St Andrew

Administration
- Diocese: Leicester
- Archdeaconry: Leicester
- Parish: Aylestone, Leicestershire

Clergy
- Rector: Rowena Bass

St Andrew's Church is a church in Aylestone, Leicestershire. It is a Grade II* listed building.

== History ==
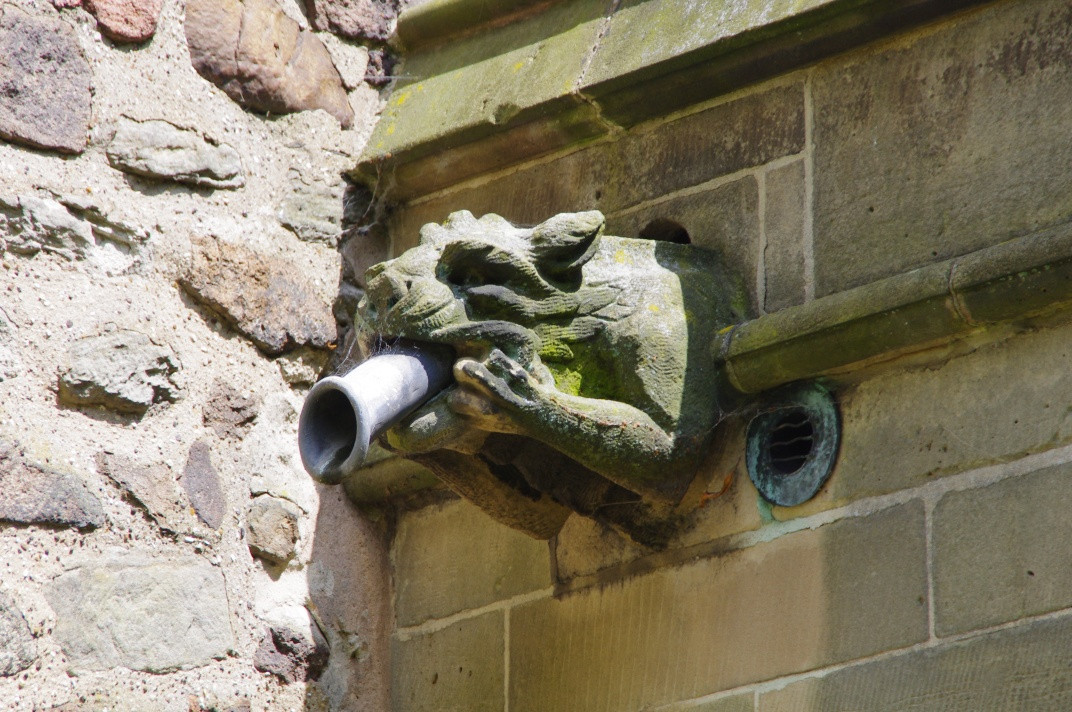
Gargoyle on the porch

The church is built of Triassic sandstone. The north aisle was added in the 13th century, as was the tower, which now has a broach spire. The 14th century saw the chancel, which is longer and wider than the nave, being built and the north aisle enlarged. The south aisle was added the following century and a clerestory was added.

== Bibliography ==
- Braund, John; Evans, Janet (1983). Old Aylestone. Blaby, Leicester: Anderson Publications. ISBN 0-907917-04-6.
- Dare, M. Paul (1924). Ayleston Manor and Church. Leicester: Edgar Backus.
- Pevsner, Nikolaus (1960). The Buildings of England:Leicestershire and Rutland. Harmondsworth, Middlesex: Penguin.
- Parker, J. John (2004). Spirit of Aylestone. Blaby, Leicester: Blaby Art and Print.
