= St James the Greater, Leicester =

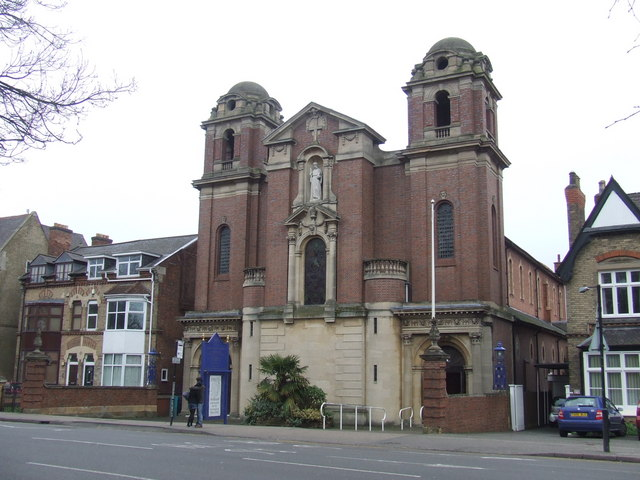
- St James the Greater, Leicester
- St James the Greater, Leicester
- 52°37′24.7″N 1°06′54.75″W
- OS grid reference: SK 60025 03300
- Location: Leicester
- Country: England
- Denomination: Church of England
- Website: dlibitum.co.uk/sjg

History
- Dedication: St James the Greater
- Consecrated: 25 July 1901

Architecture
- Heritage designation: Grade II* listed
- Architect: Henry L Goddard
- Groundbreaking: 28 October 1899
- Completed: 24 September 1914

Administration
- Diocese: Diocese of Leicester
- Archdeaconry: Leicester
- Deanery: City of Leicester
- Parish: St James, Leicester

St James the Greater, Leicester is a Grade II* listed parish church in the Church of England in Leicester, Leicestershire. It is located south of the city centre of Leicester, on the London Road (A6), opposite Victoria Park.

== History ==
The church, which was founded as a daughter church of St Peter's Church, Leicester in 1881, was originally a temporary wooden church. A decade later the decision was taken to build a permanent church due to the increase in the congregation. The work was entrusted to the architect, Henry Langton Goddard of Leicester. On the advice of Bishop Mandell Creighton, Bishop of Peterborough, Goddard visited several churches in northern Italy. Bishop Creighton wanted the new church to be architectural impressive to reflect its status in Leicester. After visiting Italy, Goddard's external design for St James was influenced by Torcello Cathedral on the Venetian lagoon and its interior decor from churches in Venice and Florence. The foundation stone was laid on 28 October 1899; the building was consecrated on 25 July 1901.

The west front was completed between 1911 and 1914 and was dedicated by Creighton's successor Edward Carr Glyn, the Bishop of Peterborough, on 24 September 1914.

St James the Greater became a parish in its own right on 25 June 1918.

In the late 1950s, the Diocese of Leicester threatened to close the church dues to falling congressional numbers. However, its incumbent, Reverend Lawrence Jackson, who was appointed in 1959, managed to bring people back to the church with his remarkable ministry. The Church had one of the largest congregations in the Diocese at the time Lawrence moved to Coventry in 1965. St James the Greater continues to have an active congregation. It hosts a variety of events, has two church halls and remains one of Leicester’s best-known churches.

== Organ ==
The pipe organ, which was built by Stephen Taylor, is listed on the National Pipe Organ Register.
