= Aylestone =

Suburb of Leicester, England

Coordinates: 52.604°N 1.154°W

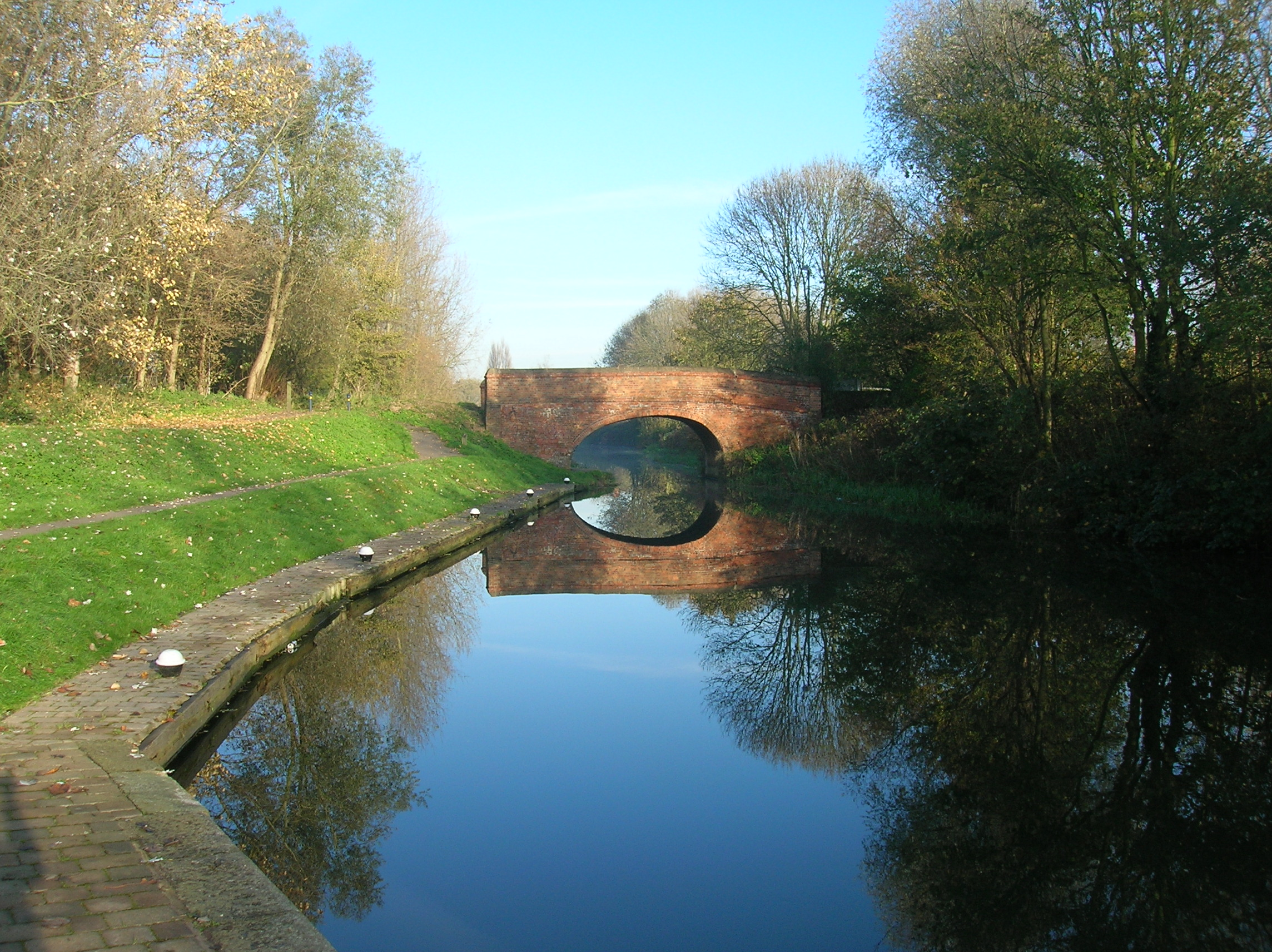
- Bridge over the canal at Aylestone Meadows

- Location within Leicestershire
- Population: 11,151 (2011)
- OS grid reference: SK573009
  - London: 101 mi (163 km) S
- Unitary authority: Leicester
- Ceremonial county: Leicestershire
- Region: East Midlands
- Country: England
- Sovereign state: United Kingdom
- Post town: Leicester
- Postcode district: LE2
- Dialling code: 0116
- Police: Leicestershire
- Fire: Leicestershire
- Ambulance: East Midlands
- UK Parliament: Leicester West

Map showing locations around Aylestone. The shaded area shows the Leicester city boundary.

Aylestone is a suburb of Leicester in Leicestershire, England, southwest of the city centre and east of the River Soar.

St Andrew's Church, Aylestone dates from the 13th century. The area around the church retains much of the former village character. It is largely surrounded by Victorian housing close to the city centre (Aylestone Park) and by 20th-century housing in other directions.

The electoral ward of Aylestone covers Old Aylestone village (including the conservation area), the Gilmorton estate, the south and west of Aylestone Park (the remainder is in Saffron ward) and the southwest side of Saffron Lane (to Grace Road). The ward borders Saffron and Eyres Monsell wards and the county parish of Glen Parva and is in the parliamentary constituency of Leicester West. The ward has two elected councillors: currently these are Councillor Scott Kennedy-Lount (Liberal Democrat, first elected 2023) and Councillor Nigel Porter (formerly Conservative, from 2011 a Liberal Democrat).

== History ==
The name 'Aylestone' comes from the Anglo-Saxon 'Aegel's settlement' or 'Egil's settlement'. Aylestone was recorded in the Domesday Book as Ailstone, held in the reign of Edward the Confessor by Alveva, Countess of Mercia. In 1086 it was held by Robert de Beaumont, 1st Earl of Leicester. The manor passed from Robert to his son Robert le Bossu, thence to Bossu's son Robert Blanchemains and finally to Blanchemains' son, Robert FitzPernel. FitzPernel died without issue, and his estates were divided between his two sisters, the manor of Aylestone passing to Margaret, who married Saer de Quincy, 1st Earl of Winchester. The manor passed by marriage into the hands of the Harcourt family, and then the Pembrugge family of Tong, Shropshire. On the death of Fulke de Pembrugge IV in 1409, the manor passed to his wife Isabel. Fulke and Isabel having no issue, the manor eventually passed to the grandson of Fulk's sister Juliana, Richard Vernon III. Aylestone remained in the hands of the Vernon family until the death of Sir George Vernon in 1565. His daughter Dorothy having married John Manners, second son of the 1st Earl of Rutland, Aylestone passed to the Manners family, who later became the Dukes of Rutland.

The estate was sold by the 6th Duke of Rutland, the sale being held at the Temperance Hall in Leicester on 26 June 1869.

The Leicester Extension Act 1891 (54 & 55 Vict. c. c) incorporated Aylestone into the Borough of Leicester. The village had at this time an area of 1,723 acres. On 26 March 1896 the civil parish was abolished and merged with Leicester.

Aylestone's open fields were enclosed in 1766. about this time Aylestone was the chosen route into Leicester Town for the supply of coal from the areas around Bagworth, Desford and Swannington which was carried in by Packhorse "trains" who crossed, on the Aylestone packhorse bridge, the (sometimes swampy) flood plain area now known as Aylestone Meadows.

During the English Civil War/War of Three Kingdoms King Charles I of England and Prince Rupert used Aylestone Hall as their headquarters during the siege and storming of Parliamentarian Leicester Town by the main Royalist field army on 30 and 31 May 1645. Aylestone Hall was occupied by a ladies' boarding school in 1846. When the estate was sold in 1869 the hall was occupied by a tenant, Nathaniel Stone, who purchased it. From 1871 to 1938 the hall was occupied by the Stretton family. It was requisitioned by the army during World War II. In 1950 Leicester City Council purchased it, and after renovation the hall and the grounds were opened in 1954 as a public park, with a restaurant and a clubhouse for the local bowling club.

Aylestone Hall was renovated again in 2003, and converted into three separate dwellings and a clubhouse. It had been assumed that much of the hall's medieval fabric had been destroyed when alterations were made in 1850. However early timber framing, including parts of an aisled hall, were found during a preliminary investigation. The timbers were dated by dendrochronology to 1339. The hall has a mid-16th-century cross wing of stone in a timber frame, and was re–roofed in the late 17th century, using many of the original 14th-century timbers. Many of the seemingly Tudor architectural features, such as the star–shaped chimneys, were introduced during the rebuilding of 1850. It was the home of Dorothy Vernon and John Manners.

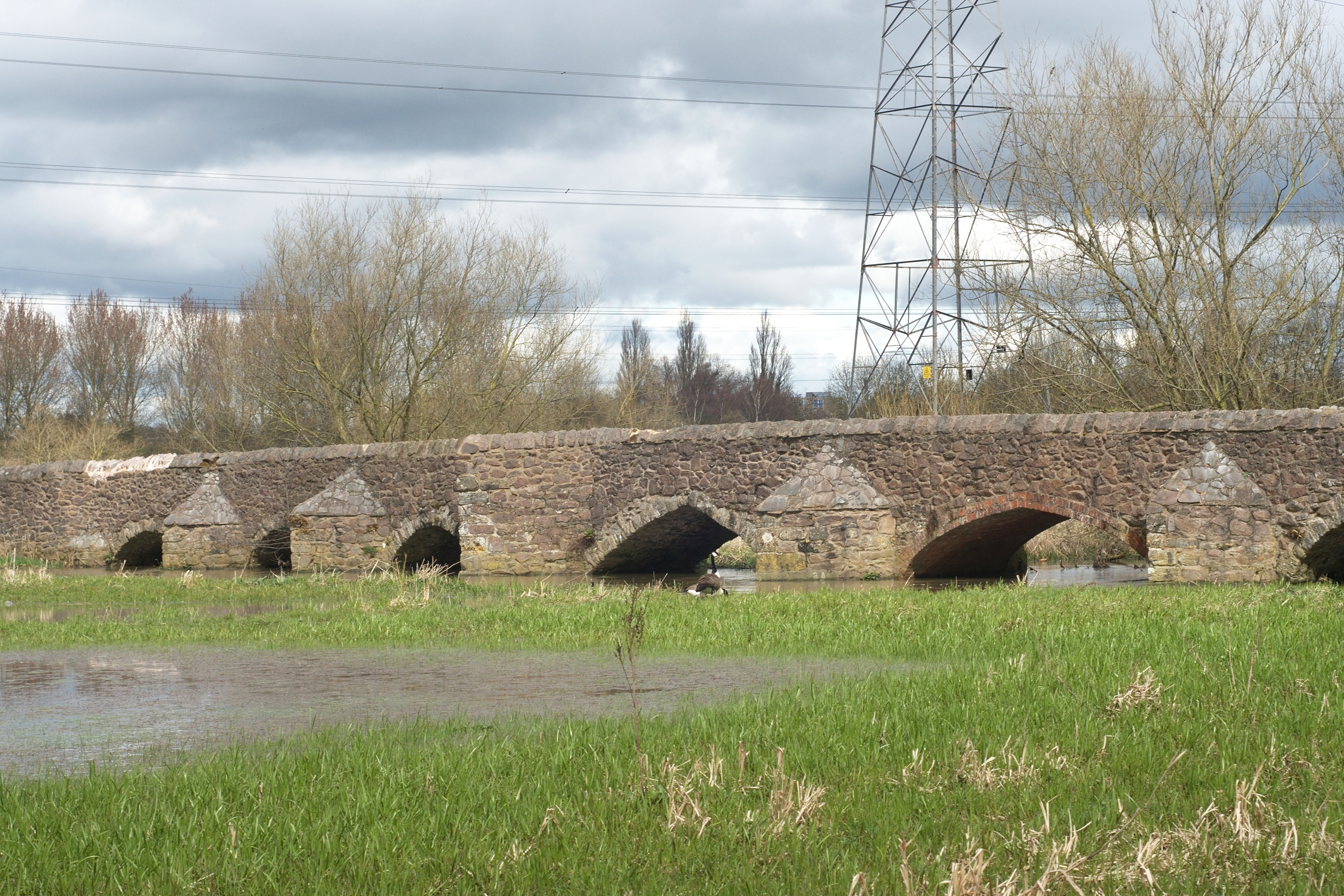
Aylestone Old Bridge

A 15th-century packhorse bridge at the west end of Marsden Lane crosses the River Soar on eleven arches.

Aylestone Park is an area of housing approximately a mile square, which grew between Leicester and Aylestone village and which has housing generally built since 1875.

Aylestone Meadows is a large area of playing fields and water-meadow nearby, and contributes to the semi-rural character of the suburb. In 2003 they were designated a Local Nature Reserve. Plans by Leicester City Council to bulldoze an area within the Aylestone Meadows to make way for an artificial sports pitch, single storey clubhouse and car park, were defeated on 21 March 2011 when the Planning Committee rejected the plans. Many groups including the Aylestone Meadows Appreciation Society, Leicester Friends of the Earth, Leicestershire & Rutland Wildlife Trust, the Leicester Civic Society, and the Campaign for Rural England, all helped rally support against the plans. It was the first time that an E-Petition on Leicester City Council's website had ever been used.

=== Demography ===
In 2001, the ward of Aylestone had a population of 10,801. The population of the parish in 1871 was 450, in 1881 it was 2,546 and in 1891 it was 5,381.

=== Culture and community ===
The Aylestone Boathouse, a large wooden building, was built c. 1911 by Gordon Biggs on the site of a canal wharf close to Middleton Street. Rollers were installed by the side of King's Lock to allow boats to be transferred to the River Soar from the canal. Later a brick-built ballroom and restaurant, and tennis courts, were added. The building was used as an engineering works during World War II. The boathouse was demolished c.1980. The ballroom became a bingo hall, and was eventually demolished and replaced by housing.

== Transport ==
From Aylestone the canalised River Soar flows northwards to the River Trent. Southwards the Soar was too shallow for navigation, and a canal was dug from a junction with the river just north of the packhorse bridge to Market Harborough, where it connected with the Grand Junction Canal. The section from Loughborough to Aylestone and Blaby was opened in 1794, and the section to Market Harborough in 1809.

A horse tram service to Grace Road was started on 7 June 1878. The tramlines were extended to Belvoir Drive in 1884. Leicester Corporation took over the system in 1901, and converted it to electric traction in May 1904, at which time it was extended to a terminus at Wigston Lane. Services ceased on 5 January 1947.

The Great Central Railway passed near to the village, on an embankment between 35 ft (10.7 m) and 40 ft (12.2 m) high. Although the line opened for passenger traffic on 15 March 1899, no station was provided at Aylestone. The nearest stations were Leicester Central and Whetstone.

Arriva Midlands operate frequent buses into Leicester on services 84, 85 and 87 all running along Aylestone Road while Centrebus 83/83A routes also operate at infrequent times into the nearby Gilmorton Avenue estate.

== Education ==
In 1786 the assistant curate of St Andrew's, William Bickerstaffe, and 58 householders petitioned the 4th Duke of Rutland to establish a Charity School at Aylestone for 30 children. In 1844 a National School was opened on land given by the 5th Duke, off Church Road (then called School Road). It had about 40 boys and 50 girls. The school was enlarged in 1881 to accommodate 170 boys, 170 girls and 300 infants, and was run by the Aylestone School Board. It was closed in 1891, when the schools in Aylestone were taken over by the Leicester School Board.

In 1879 the Aylestone School Board applied to open two more schools; these were in Landsdown Road (1881) and Granby Road (1889). The Leicester Education Authority built two schools, at Knighton Fields Road West and Wigston Lane, before 1939.

== Religious sites ==
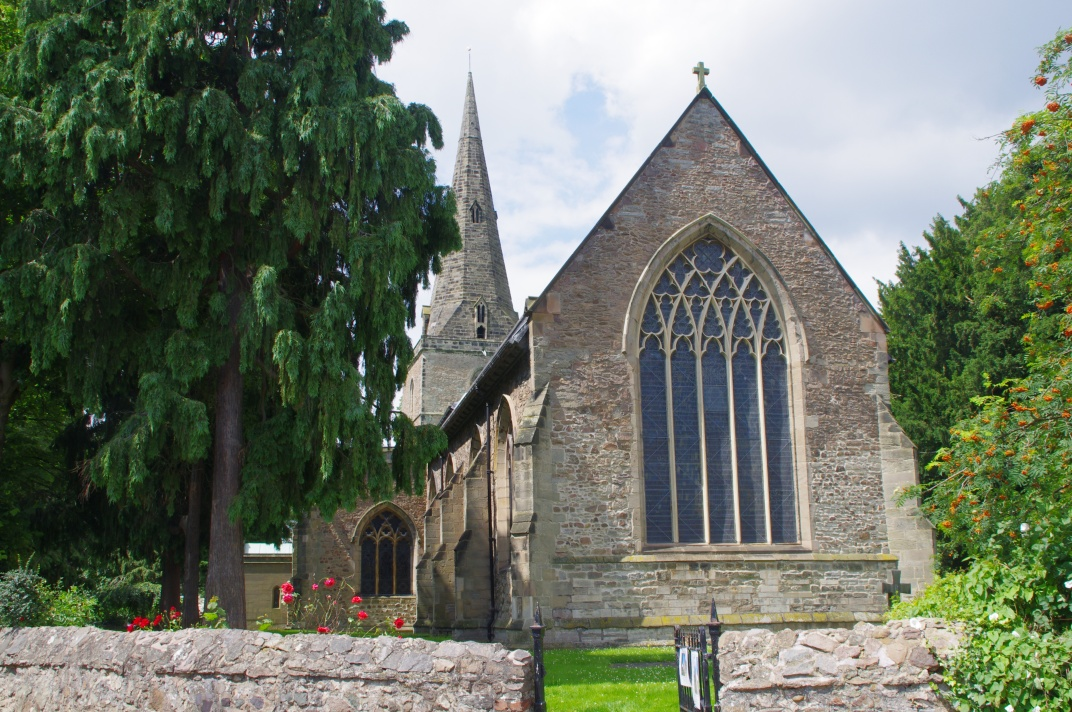
St Andrew's Church, Aylestone

The Anglican church, St Andrew's, is built of grey-green Triassic sandstone. The tower and north aisle are 13th-century; the aisle was enlarged in the 14th century when the chancel was built. In the 15th century a clerestory and a south aisle were added. The tower is surmounted by a broach spire whose base is inset behind a parapet. The chancel, built circa 1300–1310, is taller, longer and wider than the nave.

The Roman Catholic church of St Edward the Confessor opened on 3 May 1922. This replaced temporary premises in Knighton Lane (a bake house and later a room over a stable) which had been used since 1915 as chapels. The church was served by the Dominicans of Holy Cross Priory, Leicester, until 1937 when the parish was taken over by the Roman Catholic Diocese of Nottingham.

The Baptists of Aylestone originally met, from 1855, in a cottage belonging to a Mr and Mrs Crosher in The Hollow. By 1868 the cottage was recorded as being in disrepair. In 1869 a lean-to brick building adjoining a cottage in The Hollow was acquired; this held about 50 people. At the same time a plot of land on Sanvey Gate was purchased for the building of a chapel- this, the Aylestone Baptist Chapel, was built in 1871. A new church and school building was built on Lutterworth Road in 1932, and opened in February 1933. The old church was sold in 1934, and became a clubhouse. It was acquired by the Apostolic Church in 1974.

The Church of the Nativity, on Cavendish Road, Aylestone Park, is a combined Methodist and Anglican church, formed as a Local ecumenical partnership (LEP).

== Geography ==
Aylestone is the name of two output areas used in the UK Census. One, code 00FNNG, is centred on the Leicester location; the other, code 00GANY, is centred on Aylestone Hill (grid reference SO520407), Herefordshire.

== Sport ==
Of the three local football teams, St Andrew's FC has a pitch on Disraeli St, off Church Road, Aylestone. Their local rivals Aylestone Park F.C. are located on Saffron Lane, Leicester, whilst Friar Lane & Epworth F.C. play at Knighton Lane East.

== Bibliography ==
- Braund, John; Evans, Janet (1983). Old Aylestone. Blaby, Leicester: Anderson Publications. ISBN 0-907917-04-6.
- Dare, M. Paul (1924). Ayleston Manor and Church. Leicester: Edgar Backus.
- Pevsner, Nikolaus (1960). The Buildings of England:Leicestershire and Rutland. Harmondsworth, Middlesex: Penguin.
- Parker, J. John (2004). Spirit of Aylestone. Blaby, Leicester: Blaby Art and Print.
