= St Saviour's Church, Leicester =

St Saviour’s Church, Leicester
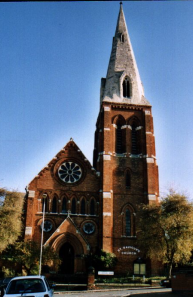
- St Saviour’s Church, Leicester
- St Saviour’s Church, Leicester
- 52°38′16.9″N 1°06′32.8″W
- OS grid reference: SK 60390 04858
- Location: Leicester
- Country: England
- Denomination: Church of England

History
- Dedication: St Saviour
- Consecrated: 21 June 1877

Architecture
- Heritage designation: Grade II* listed
- Architect: George Gilbert Scott
- Groundbreaking: 7 June 1875
- Completed: 1877
- Construction cost: £11,500
- Closed: 2005

Specifications
- Capacity: 1,000 persons
- Length: 152 feet (46 m)
- Width: 68 feet (21 m)
- Height: 150 feet (46 m)

Administration
- Diocese: Diocese of Leicester
- Archdeaconry: Leicester
- Deanery: City of Leicester
- Parish: The Presentation of Christ, Leicester

St Saviour's Church, Leicester is a Grade II* listed former parish church in the Church of England in Leicester, Leicestershire.

== History ==
The foundation stone was laid on 7 June 1875. The church was the gift of the Rev Frederick George Burnaby, formerly rector of Barkestone-le-Vale in the Vale of Belvoir. It was designed in the 13th century Early English style by the architect Sir George Gilbert Scott. The contractors were Messrs Osborne Brothers and the clerk-of-works was a Mr G. W. Wood. The church was consecrated on 21 June 1877 by the Bishop of Peterborough.

On 28 October 2023, the church annexe was destroyed by fire.

== Parish ==
The church is in a joint parish known as the Presentation of Christ, Leicester, with:

- St Peter's Church, Leicester
- St Barnabas' Church, New Humberstone (now closed).

== Organ ==
The pipe organ was built by Stephen Taylor & Son in 1878. A specification of the organ can be found on the National Pipe Organ Register.
