= Pajeet =

Ethnic slur directed at Indians

Pajeet, alternatively jeet, is an ethnic slur directed at Indians, particularly Hindus and Sikhs. The term first appeared on 4chan in 2015 and it has been used more widely since the early 2020s.

== Etymology ==
The term Pajeet is an invented name, an imitation of Indian names with the element jeet, such as Amarjeet and Ranjeet. Jeet comes from Sanskrit जित (jitá, IPA: [d͡ʑi.t̪ɐ]) meaning 'victory' or 'conquered', while the first element can be parsed as a derivation of paji, a respectful term of address in Punjabi meaning older brother.

== History ==
The term Pajeet originated from the "Pajeet my son" meme created on the 4chan message board /int/ in July 2015 mocking open defecation in India. This was itself inspired by the "Mehmet, my son" meme, popularised on the same board in late 2014, which mocked Turkish people. A female version Pajeeta appeared later.

Prior to 2019, Pajeet was mainly limited to a small number of social media platforms such as 4chan, Gab and Telegram. John Earnest, the perpetrator of the 2019 Poway synagogue shooting, referred to "pajeets" in his manifesto.

In the months preceding the 2022 Leicester unrest between Hindus and Muslims, anti-Hindu memes were accompanied by pajeet depicting Hindus as barbaric and dirty. Rutgers University's Network Contagion Research Institute (NCRI) investigated the online trends between 2019 and 2022, noting a wide dispersion of anti-Hindu and anti-Indian slurs and tropes during this period. The NCRI report concluded that the word Pajeet is often used, "with the majority of derogatory characterisations towards Hindus", alongside a depiction of Hindu religious symbols. The earliest "malicious narrative" during the Leicester unrest was spread by a twitter user called "tragicbud", whose user description included the line "fuck them pajeets".

According to the Institute for Strategic Dialogue (ISD), between May 2023 and April 2025 there were over 26,600 posts which included pajeet and other anti-South Asian slurs in Canada, compared to nearly 1,600 posts containing anti-Muslim slurs. The 2024 Francis Scott Key Bridge collapse due to a collision by the container ship MV Dali, whose crew partially consisted of Indians, resulted in numerous anti-Indian posts on social media platforms which used the term pajeet. Much of the discourse on pajeet on social media appears to originate from the United States and Canada, and is seen to be linked to conspiracy theories such as the Great Replacement Theory. On X, the term shows up linked to the themes of immigration, open defecation, and cows.

The slur has also been used against politicians of Indian origin. Former British prime minister Rishi Sunak and American presidential candidate Vivek Ramaswamy were often targeted with the slur.

== Bibliography ==
- Sudhakar, Prasiddha; Goldenberg, Alex; Finkelstein, Joel; Donohue, Jack; Ratadiya, Pratik; Farmer, John; Riggleman, Denver; Benson, Richard; et al. (October 2022), Cyber Social Swarming Precedes Real World Riots in Leicester: How Social Media Became a Weapon for Violence (PDF), Network Contagion Research Institute and Rutgers University
- Sudhakar, Prasiddha; Farmer, John; Finkelstein, Joel; Jussim, Lee; Parihar, Parth; Riggleman, Denver (November 2022), Quantitative Methods for Investigating Anti-Hindu Disinformation (PDF), Network Contagion Research Institute and Rutgers University
- Sundaram, Dheepa (2024). "An academic conference, a bomb threat, and the title VI complaint: U.S. Hindu nationalist groups' litigious assault on academic freedom". Drexel Law Review. 16 (4): 837–889.
