= Anti-Hindu sentiment =

Anti-Hindu sentiment, also referred to as Hinduphobia, is the fear, hostility, prejudice, discrimination or negative perceptions directed toward practitioners of Hinduism or the religion itself. It can take forms such as anti-Hindu rhetoric, harassment or violence against Hindu individuals and communities, and attacks on Hindu temples and other religious sites. Some scholars and activists have disagreed over the meaning and application of the term Hinduphobia.

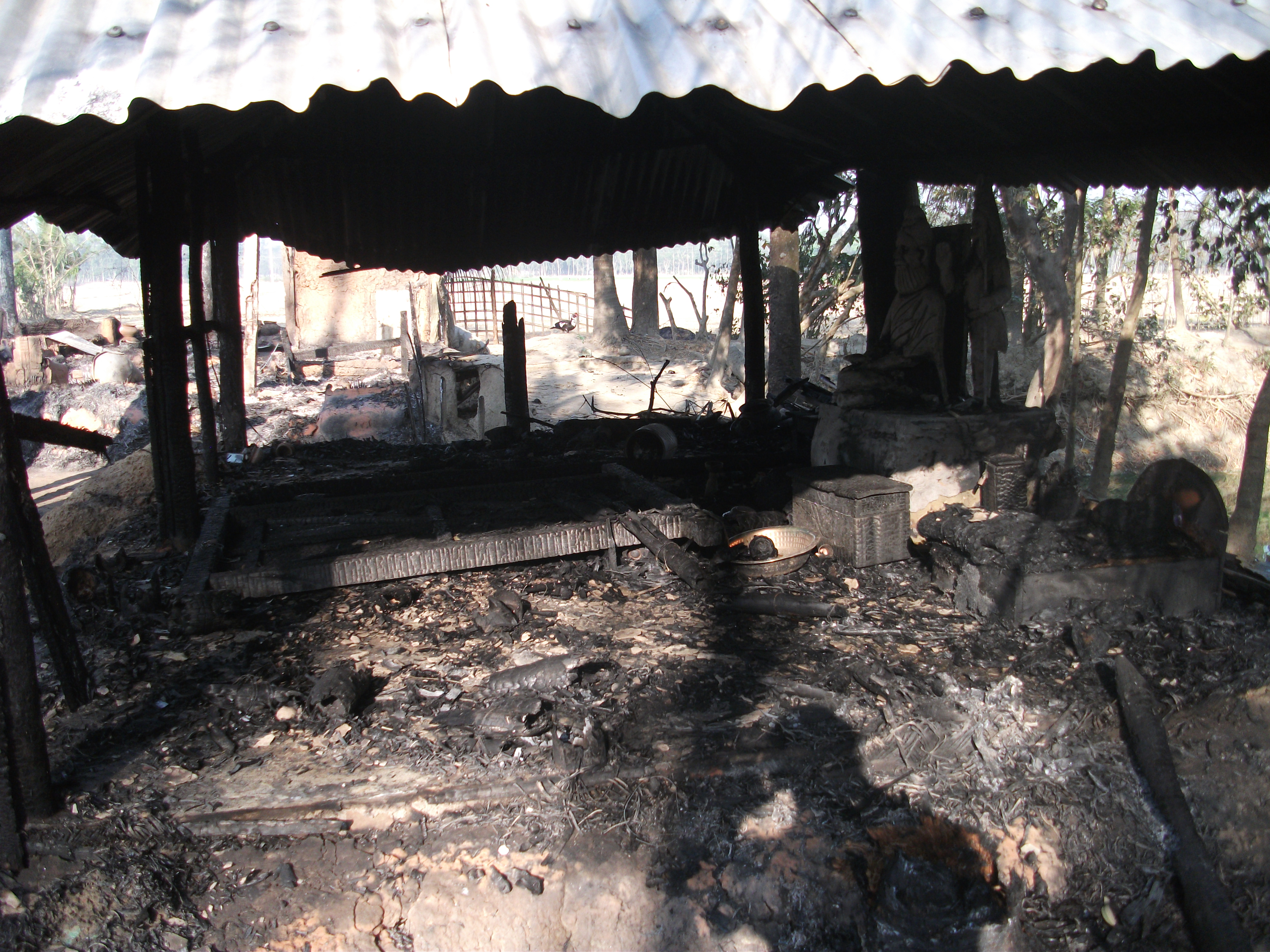
Destroyed Hindu temple in Banshkhali, Chittagong, Bangladesh

== Definitions ==
=== Historical ===
In the late 19th and early 20th century, the word Hinduphobia was used more generally to refer to prejudice against Indians, regardless of religion. This reflected an earlier usage of the word Hindu, which referred to everyone from India. Sudhindra Bose, president of the Hindustan Association of America, used the word Hinduphobia as the title of a 1914 essay in The Cosmopolitan Student in this sense. (Note: Kim notes that Bose "described Hinduphobia not as a constant problem, but a temporary bout of madness." She also notes: "Although race remained an issue that was evoked to curtail the rights of Indians, the example of Bose cited by contemporary Hindu advocacy groups does not support the Hinduphobia argument. What Bose’s article on Hinduphobia shows is a historical example of Indians fighting for the rights of Indians in the US as well as in the subcontinent.") The Hindustan Association of America clarified in a 1915 pamphlet that "Hindus unified peoples of India not as Hindus, Mohammadans and Christians; [...] sons and daughters of India but not as Brahman [sic], sudra, and untouchables."

=== Contemporary ===
In contemporary discussions, the definition of Hinduphobia and the origin of the term are contested. Rajiv Malhotra (Note: Malhotra is a retired Indian American computer scientist and public proponent of Hindutva) and the London-based group Hindu Human Rights both claimed to have coined the term.. Malhotra is credited for popularizing it.

Jeffery Long describes Hinduphobia as an intense averison to Hindus and Hinduism and distinguishes it from criticism of particular Hindu beliefs or practices. Vamsee Juluri, a Professor of Media Studies at the University of San Francisco agrees. (Note: In a discourse on the related issue of California textbook controversy, Chinnaiah Jangam (Professor of South Asian History at Carleton University) had noted that Juluri did not have any academic training in history, swore by Brahminical ideology, and even wrote a book in defense of militant Hindu nationalism. Juluri rejected the charges.)

Sophie-Jung H. Kim said that the definition of Hinduphobia as presented by some Hindu activist groups "evolve depending on the evidence that the members of these groups discover." She also examined how Hindu advocacy organizations in the United States define and document Hinduphobia. She notes that the Hindu American Foundation's glossary of Hinduphobic terms changed between 2021 and 2023 as additional examples were classified as Hinduphobic.

== Distribution ==
=== Afghanistan ===
Religious persecution, discrimination of Hindus has caused Afghanistan's Hindu population to dwindle. Sikhs and Hindus are continuing to flee from Afghanistan as of July 2020.

The Taliban government in Afghanistan, which enforced strict sharia (Islamic law), announced plans to require all Hindus (and Sikhs) to wear identifying badges in public in May 2001 as part of the Taliban's campaign to segregate and repress non-Muslim parts of Afghan society. At the time, about 500 Hindus and 2,000 Sikhs remained in Afghanistan. The anti-Hindu decree was seen by many as being reminiscent of the Nazi law which required all Jews to wear identifying yellow badges. The order prompted international outrage, and it was denounced by the Indian and U.S. governments, as well as by Abraham Foxman of the ADL. Following international pressure, the Taliban regime dropped the badge plans in June 2001.

=== Australia ===
In April 2024, a Hindu woman named Swastika Chandra from Sydney was banned from using the Uber app because it considered her first name (Swastika) to be offensive and related to Nazism. The Swastika is a Hindu symbol of divinity and spirituality that the Hindu community has used for centuries; however, its perception in other parts of the world is different due to the adoption of the symbol by the Nazi Party in the early 20th century. After a period of six months, Uber eventually lifted the ban and apologized for the misunderstanding.

=== Bangladesh ===
A well publicised event of Anti-Hindu statement occurred in 1996 when Khaleda Zia a previous Prime Minister, and then leader of the opposition, declared that the country was at risk of hearing "uludhhwani" (a Bengali Hindu custom involving women's ululation) from mosques, replacing the azaan (Muslim call to prayer).

The fundamentalists and right-wing parties such as the Bangladesh Nationalist Party and Jatiya Party often portray Hindus as being sympathetic to India, making accusations of dual loyalty and allegations of transferring economic resources to India, contributing to a widespread perception that Bangladeshi Hindus are disloyal to the state. Also, the right wing parties claim the Hindus to be backing the Awami League.

On 28 February 2013, the International Crimes Tribunal sentenced Delwar Hossain Sayeedi, the Vice President of the Jamaat-e-Islami to death for the war crimes committed during the 1971 Bangladesh Liberation War. Following the sentence, Jamaat-e-Islami activists attacked Hindu communities across the country. Hindu properties were looted and burned down, and temples were desecrated and set on fire. While the government has held the Jamaat-e-Islami responsible for the attacks on the minorities, the Jamaat-e-Islami leadership has denied any involvement. The minority leaders have protested the attacks and appealed for justice. The Supreme Court of Bangladesh has directed the law enforcement to start suo motu investigation into the attacks. US Ambassador to Bangladesh express concern about attack of Jamaat on Bengali Hindu community. The violence included the looting of Hindu properties and businesses, the burning of Hindu homes, and desecration and destruction of Hindu temples. According to community leaders, more than 50 Hindu temples and 1,500 Hindu homes were destroyed in 20 districts. On 5 May 2014, A mob of almost 3,000 attacked Hindu households and a temple in eastern Bangladesh after two youths from the community allegedly insulted the Islamic prophet, Muhammad on Facebook. In 2025, a 21-year-old Hindu woman was gang-raped in the Cumilla district in Central Bangladesh by a member of the Khaleda Zia-led Bangladesh Nationalist Party. There were 2,442 instances of atrocities against religious minorities (mainly Hindus) in Bangladesh in 2024, and that the number stands at 72 in 2025 till the end of March 2025.

=== India ===
According to PEW Research, Hindus face "widespread" discrimination in India. Specifically, the study states: "the share of Muslims who see widespread discrimination against their community is similar to the share of Hindus who say Hindus face widespread religious discrimination in India (21%)."

Between 11:30 pm and midnight on 26 August 2024, the idol of the goddess in Bhoolaxmi temple was destroyed by vandals. The temple is located in the Rakshapuram area of Hyderabad, and is 50 yards (46 m) from the police station. Local politician, Samreddy Surender Reddy said that the temple had been attacked by vandals five times during the past five years. The police used CCTV to identify two suspects, who they arrested. A crowd gathered outside the temple to protest against the vandalism. The police said that there was no evidence that the vandalism was politically motivated.

In September 2024, stones were pelted at Ganesha idol processions in many parts of India. The police were also attacked in many places, but managed to seize the swords used to attack the devotees; petrol bombs were also used to set shops on fire. In another incident, the Ganesha idol was taken from the demonstrators by the police, who then secured it in an unoccupied police van, the snaps of which went viral online, as well as in newspapers; some claimed it was "belittling" to do so. In September 2025, there were more incidents of stone-pelting of Ganesha idols during immersion and Chappanbhog ceremonies in different parts of India; in an incident in late August 2025, eggs were thrown instead of stones.

=== Malaysia ===
In April 2006, local authorities demolished several Hindu temples to make way for developmental projects. Their reason was that these temples were unlicensed and squatting on government land. In April and May 2006, several Hindu temples were demolished by city hall authorities in the country, accompanied by violence against Hindus. On 21 April 2006, the Malaimel Sri Selva Kaliamman Temple in Kuala Lumpur was reduced to rubble after the city hall sent in bulldozers.

The president of the Consumers Association of Subang and Shah Alam in Selangor had been helping to organise efforts to stop the local authorities in the Muslim-dominated city of Shah Alam from demolishing a 107-year-old Hindu temple. The growing Islamization in Malaysia is a cause for concern to many Malaysians who follow minority religions such as Hinduism.

On 11 May 2006, armed city hall officers from Kuala Lumpur forcefully demolished part of a 60-year-old suburban temple that serves more than 1,000 Hindus. The "Hindu Rights Action Force", a coalition of several NGOs, has protested these demolitions by lodging complaints with the Malaysian Prime Minister. Many Hindu advocacy groups have protested what they allege is a systematic plan of temple cleansing in Malaysia. The official reason given by the Malaysian government has been that the temples were built "illegally". However, several of the temples are centuries old. According to a lawyer for the Hindu Rights Action Task Force, a Hindu temple is demolished in Malaysia once every three weeks.

=== Pakistan ===
On Pakistan Day, the Pakistan Army dropped leaflets in South and North Waziristan, warning tribesmen about foreigners and their local supporters, using the term "Yahood Aur Hanood" (Jews and Hindus) to describe the perceived enemies. The leaflets aimed to differentiate between the war on terror and local tribes, urging vigilance against intruders. At the time of Pakistan's creation, the 'hostage theory' had been espoused. According to this theory, the Hindu minority in Pakistan was to be tied to the Muslim minority in India, held hostage to force the Indian government to treat them well.

Separate electorates for Hindus and Christians were established in 1985—a policy which was originally proposed by Islamist leader Abul A'la Maududi. Christian and Hindu leaders complained that they felt excluded from the county's political process, but the policy had strong support from Islamists.

The Muttahida Majlis-e-Amal (MMA), a coalition of Islamist political parties in Pakistan, calls for the increased Islamization of the government and society, specifically taking an anti-Hindu stance. The MMA leads the opposition in the national assembly, held a majority in the NWFP Provincial Assembly, and was part of the ruling coalition in Balochistan. However, some members of the MMA made efforts to eliminate their rhetoric against Hindus.

The public school curriculum in Pakistan was Islamized during the 1980s. The government of Pakistan claims to undertake a major revision to eliminate such teachings and to remove Islamic teaching from secular subjects.

A more recent textbook which was published in Pakistan and titled A Short History of Pakistan, edited by Ishtiaq Hussain Qureshi, has been heavily criticized by academic peer-reviewers for anti-Hindu biases and prejudices that are consistent with Pakistani nationalism, where Hindus are portrayed as "villains" and Muslims as "victims" living under the "disastrous Hindu rule" and "betraying the Muslims to the British", characterizations that academic reviewers found "disquieting" and having a "warped subjectivity".

Ameer Hamza, a leader of the terrorist group Lashkar-e-Taiba, wrote a highly derogatory book about Hinduism in 1999 called "Hindu Ki Haqeeqat" ("Reality of (a) Hindu"); he was not prosecuted by the Government.

According to the Sustainable Development Policy Institute report, 'Associated with the insistence on the Ideology of Pakistan has been an essential component of hate against India and the Hindus. For the upholders of the Ideology of Pakistan, the existence of Pakistan is defined only in relation to Hindus, and hence the Hindus have to be painted as negatively as possible.' A 2005 report by the National Commission for Justice and Peace. a non-profit organization in Pakistan, found that Pakistan Studies textbooks in Pakistan have been used to articulate the hatred that Pakistani policy-makers have attempted to inculcate towards the Hindus. "Vituperative animosities legitimise military and autocratic rule, nurturing a siege mentality. Pakistan Studies textbooks are an active site to represent India as a hostile neighbour", the report stated. "The story of Pakistan's past is intentionally written to be distinct from, and often in direct contrast with, interpretations of history found in India. From the government-issued textbooks, students are taught that Hindus are backward and superstitious." Further, the report stated, "Textbooks reflect intentional obfuscation. Today's students, citizens of Pakistan, and its future leaders are the victims of these partial truths."

An editorial in Dawn discussed a report by The Guardian, which noted that Pakistan's state-run schools extensively promoted extremism and bigotry. Among others, it highlighted that textbooks in Pakistani state schools propagate concepts like jihad, the inferiority of non-Muslims, and hostility towards India, which foster a bigoted and obscurantist mindset. According to a study by a US government commission, textbooks in Pakistani schools foster prejudice and intolerance of Hindus and other religious minorities, and most teachers view non-Muslims as enemies of Islam. According to historian Professor Mubarak Ali, textbook reform in Pakistan began with Zulfikar Ali Bhutto's introduction of Pakistan Studies and Islamic Studies in 1971. General Zia-ul-Haq later intensified historical revisionism, exploiting these reforms to promote a religiously exclusive narrative, which has contributed to intolerance and extremism. The broader context includes issues with outdated and biased textbook content, with reform efforts struggling to address these problems comprehensively.

=== United Kingdom ===
After the Leicester riots in October 2022, Hindu groups were set to boycott a review by Dr. Chris Allen, the review's head, because of perceived lack of impartiality. When SOAS set out to conduct an "independent inquiry", the Hindu groups of Leicester refused to participate, citing concerns of impartiality and independence. The International Centre for Sustainability, which reviewed the eventual report of the inquiry, found that it carried a disproportionate analytical emphasis on "Hindu extremism" and no similar treatment of "political Islamist disinformation". A 2025 study by the same institution found 79% respondents saying that Hindus were not fairly represented in mainstream media, 78% saying anti-Hindu hate was common on social media platforms, and 40% saying that anti-Hindu hate was present in their educational institutions.

A study by Henry Jackson Society in 2023 found that 51% of Hindu parents reported their children facing Anti-Hindu hate in schools. Muslim pupils were telling their Hindu classmates to change their religion to avoid bullying; the Hindu pupils were facing physical assaults or having beef thrown at them as harassment. The latter were being held responsible for politics and social issues in India, in a manner similar to what was found in the Leicester riots. The schools had failed to monitor and address the issues.

=== United States ===
The rise of the Indian American community in the United States has triggered attacks on them. Khyati Joshi argues that attacks which specifically target Hindus in the United States sometimes stems from the "racialization of religion" among Americans, when race becomes associated with religion. Joshi argues "the religious nature of discrimination is overlooked" because of this. In addition, anti-Hindu views have been expressed, which are specifically based on misperceptions of the religion of Hinduism as well as mistaken racial perceptions. According to the religious dialogue activist P. N. Benjamin, some Christian evangelists dislike the concept of Hindu gods and consider Hindu rituals barbaric, and such attitudes have caused tensions between religious communities.

Scholars place anti-Hindu sentiment in the United States within a broader history. Michael J. Altman notes the construction of Hinduism within nineteenth-century American classrooms, as a cultural foil against which the normatively white, Protestant American could identify themself. Hinduism, dismissed as "Indian paganism" within these textbooks, was the very antithesis of the American, for the student to "identify Hindoos [sic] as brown, half-civilized, pagan, and inferior to themselves". Diana L. Eck notes that with the Hart-Celler Act in 1965 allowing for large-scale immigration, hostility was renewed in opposition, with attacks on Hindu temples and destruction of Hindu murtis; additionally, the Hare Krishna sect, founded in New York, saw widespread opposition over its strong missionary basis, in what Eck compares to nineteenth-century opposition to Catholic monastic orders. More recently, Sailaja Krishnamurti notes the impact of Indiana Jones and the Temple of Doom, which depicts Hindus as performing ritual murder to satiate the "demonic" goddess Kali, in influencing the perception of American Hindus.

Christian fundamentalist agitator Pat Robertson has denounced Hinduism as "demonic", believing that when Hindus "feel any sort of inspiration, whether it's by a river or under a tree, on top of a hill, they figure that some God or spirit is responsible for that. And so they'll worship that tree, they'll worship that hill, or they'll worship anything." His remarks were widely condemned and disputed by Indian Americans and members of many non-partisan advocacy groups. Evangelical leader Albert Mohler defended Robertson's remarks, saying "any belief system, any world view, whether it's Zen Buddhism or Hinduism or dialectical materialism for that matter, Marxism, that keeps persons captive and keeps them from coming to faith in the Lord Jesus Christ, yes, is a demonstration of satanic power." In 2025, US Senate candidate Alexander Duncan argued that statues of Hindu gods should be banned in the name of Christian nationalism, and in 2026 Christian fundamentalist pastor Dale Partridge fantasized about the levelling of a "demon temple" in New Jersey.

In 2019, the Swaminarayan Temple in Kentucky was vandalised. They sprayed black paint on the deity and sprayed "Jesus is the only God" on the walls. The Christian cross was also spray-painted on various walls. In April 2015, a Hindu temple in north Texas was vandalised when nasty images were spray-painted on its walls. In February 2015, Hindu temples in Kent and the Seattle Metropolitan area were also vandalised.

In July 2019, a Hindu priest wearing his religious attire was physically assaulted by Sergio Gouveia in Queens, New York, just two blocks from Shiv Shakti Peeth Temple in Glen Oaks. A Senator and the New York State Attorney General have labeled it a hate crime, stating, "If someone is targeted because of religious robe and a couple of blocks from the temple where he resides, it is difficult to believe this was random." However, the New York police have not classified it as a hate crime.

In October 2026, a 19-year old man, Alexandros Paporakis attempted to carry out a mass shooting at a Hindu temple in Aurora. According to the prosecutors, Paporakis "allegedly told a co-worker that he wanted to kill Indians" and shared a document which highlighted his plan to carry out mass shooting. According to police chief William Nord, he "was looking for a large Hindu temple" to do this. Police said his vehicle had entered the temple's parking lot before his arrest and investigators recovered firearms, ammunition and items bearing Nazi symbolism from his home. He was charged with making a terrorist threat and unlawful possession of a weapon. This plot drew condemnation from US lawmakers, including Congressman Raja Krishnamoorthi, whose family was present at the temple during the attempt, Krishnamoorthi called for stronger protection of religious institutions.

==== United States Congress ====
In July 2007, the United States Senate conducted its morning prayer services with a Hindu prayer, a historical first. During the service, three disruptors, named Ante Nedlko Pavkovic, Katherine Lynn Pavkovic, and Christen Renee Sugar, from the Fundamentalist Christian activist group Operation Save America protested by arguing that the Hindu prayer was "an abomination", and they also claimed that they were "Christians and Patriots". They were swiftly arrested and charged with disrupting Congress.

The event generated a storm of protest by Christian right groups in the country, with the American Family Association (AFA) opposing the prayer and carrying out a campaign to lobby senators to protest against it. Their representative attacked the proceedings as "gross idolatry". The AFA sent an "Action Alert" to its members in which it asked them to e-mail, write letters, or call their Senators and ask them to oppose the Hindu prayer, stating that it is "seeking the invocation of a non-monotheistic god." The "alert" stated that "since Hindus worship multiple gods, the prayer will be completely outside the American paradigm, flying in the face of the American motto One Nation Under God." The convocation by Zed was, in fact, disrupted by three protesters in the gallery, reportedly shouting "this is an abomination" and other complaints.

Barry W. Lynn, executive director of Americans United for Separation of Church and State, said the protest "shows the intolerance of many religious right activists. They say they want more religion in the public square, but it's clear they mean only their religion."

==== Dotbusters ====
The Dotbusters was a hate group in Jersey City, New Jersey, that attacked and threatened Indian-Americans in the fall of 1987. The name originates from the bindi traditionally worn by Hindu women and girls on their foreheads. In July 1987, they had a letter published in the Jersey Journal stating that they would take any means necessary to drive the Indians out of Jersey City:

I'm writing about your article during July about the abuse of Indian People. Well, I'm here to state the other side. I hate them, if you had to live near them, you would also. We are an organization called dot busters. We have been around for 2 years. We will go to any extreme to get Indians to move out of Jersey City. If I'm walking down the street and I see a Hindu and the setting is right, I will hit him or her. We plan some of our most extreme attacks, such as breaking windows, breaking car windows, and crashing family parties. We use the phone books and look up the name Patel. Have you seen how many of them there are? Do you even live in Jersey City? Do you walk down Central Avenue and experience what its [sic] like to be near them: we have, and we just don't want it anymore. You said that they will have to start protecting themselves because the police cannot always be there. They will never do anything. They are a week [sic] race, physically [sic] and mentally. We are going to continue our way. We will never be stopped.

==== Resolutions and proclamations recognizing Hinduphobia ====
In April 2023, Georgia became the first state in the United States to pass a resolution condemning Hinduphobia. That same month, the city of Fremont, California, issued a proclamation acknowledging that "Hindu Americans have been the targets of bullying, discrimination, hate speech, harassment, and bias-motivated crimes." In January 2025, a resolution was introduced into the US House of Representatives condemning Hinduphobia.

== On social media ==
Anti-Hindu sentiment has been documented as increasing on social media, including 4chan, Instagram, Telegram, Gab, and Twitter. Online anti-Hindu bias correlates with and predict real-world anti-Hindu violence. An analysis of over 1 million tweets found that malicious actors from Iran were promoting anti-Hindu hate to inflame caste divisions. This was part of a covert influence campaign by Iranian trolls targeted at disseminating disinformation that accused Hindus of perpetrating genocide against minorities in India.

The term "pajeet" is an ethnic slur targeting Indians and, by default, Hindus, used widely across the internet. It was first coined on 4chan and has been used by white supremacists in podcasts promoting violence against Hindus. It was even used in the manifesto of white supremacist shooter John Earnest, who also targeted the Chabad synagogue in Poway, California.

After the 2025 Pahalgam terrorist attack in April 2025, anti-Hindu bias and conspiracy theories dramatically surged online on social media platforms. Deep fakes, fabricated content with ideological intent flooded social media. An analysis of YouTube comments found that Bangladeshi and Pakistani users framed the attack as a staged "drama" or "natok", intended to discredit Muslims and Pakistan reflecting that there was a strong sense of global Muslim solidarity. Many users linked the incident to a broader narrative portraying Hindus as oppressors rather than the victims.

== Criticism ==
Some academics question the usage of the term "Hinduphobia". Brian Collins (Note: Collins is the Chair Professor in Indian Religion and Philosophy at Ohio University.) found the tropes of Hinduphobia to be a popular weapon employed by the affluent Hindu diaspora in stifling critical academic discourses on Hinduism—parallels with Kansas creationists were drawn. Multiple scholars have argued that "unfounded accusations by Hindu groups of widespread Hinduphobia who seek to silence academics and limit the critical study of Hinduism reveal clear parallels to the ways that right-wing Zionist groups try to censor any speech critical of Israel by deeming it as antisemitic" and have drawn parallels between labeling any discussion of caste as "Hinduphobic" and labeling critical race theory as anti-white racism. Jeffery D. Long concluded that "[i]t seems that Hinduphobia can sometimes be in the eye of the beholder and can sometimes be a genuine phenomenon."

Long distinguishes what he describes as Hinduphobic discourse from criticism of Hinduism, arguing that criticism of particular beliefs or practices does not by itself constitute Hinduphobia. Kim's study of Hindu nationalism in the United States examines how Hindu advocacy organizations document Hinduphobia. She acknowledges incidents of hate crime and racist slurs targeting Hindu Americans, while questioning claims that these incidents demonstrate systemic anti-Hindu bias and analyzing how documentation initiatives relate to boarder narratives of marginalization and Hindu nationalism.

Some scholars and activists have disagreed over the meaning and application of the term Hinduphobia. Members of the South Asia Scholar Activist Collective (SASAC) claim that "Hinduphobia" is an ahistorical and inappropriate neologism employed by the Hindu Right in order to suppress academic inquiry into topics concerned with Hinduism, Hindutva, caste, and the Indian State. While racist and anti-Hindu prejudices have been indeed observed, in their view, Hindus have not faced entrenched systematic oppression in India or the United States. Dheepa Sundaram explains: "Often these groups [conservative Hindutva groups] use Hinduphobia framing to suggest that critiques of casteism, Islamophobia, Brahminism, and Hindutva are hallmarks of systemic anti-Hindu sentiment and constitute a discriminatory attack on Hindus and Hindu religious practices."

South Asian civil society groups have also questioned the use of "Hinduphobia". A 2022 report on disinformation in Asian American communities cited "claims of Hinduphobia by caste dominant actors" as an example of a "problemetic narrative" that may be used to harass minority community members.

== See also ==
- Anti-Indian sentiment
- Antiziganism
- 2013 Bangladesh anti-Hindu violence
- 2024 Bangladesh anti-Hindu violence
- 2025 Bangladesh anti-Hindu violence
- Godhra train burning
- Hindu nationalism
- Hindutva
- Hindutva Harassment Field Manual
- Indomania
- Pat Robertson
- Goa Inquisition
- 2023 Haryana riots
- Mappila riots
- Noakhali riots
- 2025 Pahalgam attack
