= INSIGHT UK =

Hindu organisation in the United Kingdom

INSIGHT UK is an organisation of British Hindu and British Indian (BHI) communities in the United Kingdom. It has also been called an advocacy group on behalf of these communities.

== Organisation ==
On its website, the organisation describes itself as a "social movement" for raising awareness and campaigning for causes that concern the British Hindu and Indian (BHI) communities in Britain. It first came to light in 2021 after conducting a survey on the state of Hinduism in the religious education syllabus in British schools. The study found 98 percent of respondents claiming that the study of Hinduism in religious education was of low-quality and deficient.

== Selected activities ==
During the 2022 Leicester unrest, the organisation issued tweets and narratives on its website describing the events unfolding in Leicester. Rutgers University's Network Contagion Research Institute, which studied the cyber-swarming during the unrest, treated its posts as forming part of the "Hindu Twittersphere", while another report by Centre for Democracy, Pluralism and Human Rights, cited some of its tweets in its evidence. After the unrest, the organisation led 180 Hindu groups in writing to the British prime minister urging authorities to stop hate crimes against the Hindu community.

In 2023, INSIGHT UK campaigned against the use of an Indian goddess on the label of a French beer, calling it highly insensitive and disrespectful. In September, it published a minute-long video of a Ganesh Chaturthi event in Leicester, where it accused the police of using excessive force. In October–November, it was listed among the Indian diaspora organisations that protested in support of Israel against the Hamas terror attack.

In 2024, the organisation carried out a nationwide survey regarding the British media with over 2,000 respondents. It reported that 59 percent of the respondents claimed having experienced prejudice as a result of the British media reporting; 79 percent said that the media reports resulted in negative perception of British Indians. In February, INSIGHT UK wrote an open letter to BBC, Ofcom and the House of Lords, criticising BBC's coverage of the Ayodhya Ram Mandir consecration.

== Reception ==
An article in the International Socialism magazine characterised INSIGHT UK as a Sangh Parivar organisation. (Note: The Sangh Parivar is a network of organisations affiliated to the Hindu nationalist Rashtriya Swayamsevak Sangh (RSS) in India. Its affiliates Vishwa Hindu Parishad and Hindu Swayamsevak Sangh have branches in the UK. INSIGHT UK has acknowledged their help in preparing a report. However the claim that the organisation itself is part of Sangh Parivar is unevidenced.) It criticised the organisation's report on Hinduism in school education as giving false appearance of scientific analysis, whereas it represented only the views of the organisation's sympathisers. Scroll.in stated that the organisation's reporting on the 2022 Leicester unrest for OpIndia fanned the flames, and found that it had persuaded some Hindus to boycott the SOAS inquiry in the violence, ultimately characterising the organisation as part of an increase in Hindutva influence in British politics despite the diversity of opinion among British Hindus. The Muslim news website 5 Pillars UK accused the organisation of using "far-right tropes", and targeting Muslims and other minorities in India.
