= Field manual =

Field manual may refer to

== Military manuals ==
- United States Army Field Manuals
- Truppenführung ("Handling of Combined-Arms Formations"), the German army field manual

== Political manual ==
- Hindutva Harassment Field Manual

== Other uses ==
- Field Manual, a 2008 album by Chris Walla
