= 2022 Leicester unrest =

2022 ethnic clashes in Leicester, England

- Date: 28 August – 24 September 2022
- Location: Leicester, England
- Caused by: Cricket match brawls Anti-Hindu sentiment
- Methods: Fighting, vandalism

Parties
British Muslims	British Hindus

Lead figures
Majid Freeman, Norman Khan ("Dutch Raja"); Mohammed Hijab	

Casualties
- Injuries: 25 police officers
- Arrested: 47

In August and September 2022, Leicester, England, saw a period of religious and ethnic tension between predominately British Hindus and British Muslims of South Asian origin. The unrest saw rioting, protest marches, sloganeering and ethnic violence between the two populations. It was also preceded by social media campaigning, misinformation and hate propaganda.

Muslim apprehensions of what they alleged as Hindutva fascism entering their neighbourhoods was evidently the main driver behind the unrest. Community leaders and analysts point to the Indian celebrations following the India–Pakistan 2022 Asia Cup match on 28 August as a catalyst, which saw a reaction from Pakistani fans.

== Background ==
Map of Leicester showing some of the localities and suburbs

Leicester has a significant and growing South Asian British population. Leicester is known for its ethnic diversity, and is one of three cities in England where the White British population are a minority. Since the end of the Second World War, the city has seen successive waves of migration, with immigrants from the Indian sub-continent arriving in the 1960s, followed by South Asians arriving from Kenya and Uganda in the early 1970s. By 2021, Leicester's population was 33% Muslim and 25% Hindu.

Muslims live in predominantly working class eastern Leicester (LE5 postcode), with particular concentration in the Spinney Hills and North Evington neighbourhoods. Hindus predominantly live in north Leicester (LE4 postcode), mainly in the Belgrave area.

The 'spatial polarization' developed since the 1970s, with the Belgrave area (a former working class neighbourhood) becoming home to affluent Indian-origin East African Hindus.

Scholar Ayesha Siddiqa has pointed to a growing economic disparity between Hindu and Muslim communities as a reason for resentment. The Hindu nationalist Bharatiya Janata Party (BJP) that came to power in India, along with prime minister Narendra Modi, is believed to have had high levels of support among Hindus in the UK. Muslim publications often described the BJP as "fascist" to varying degrees, language adopted by some Leicester Muslims.

The British party politics is seen to have caused polarisation between the two communities, with Muslims siding with the Labour Party and Hindus siding with the Conservative Party. The 2019 general election was not only a "Brexit and NHS election", but also a "Kashmir election" according to The Guardian columnist Sunny Hundal. This was a reference to the Modi Government's decisive action in the complete integration of Kashmir into India in 2019, and the corresponding backlash in Pakistan. These developments had reactions in British Hindu and Muslim communities. Rutgers University's Network Contagion Research Institute (NCRI), which has investigated the online trends between 2019 and 2022, noted a wide dispersion of anti-Hindu and anti-India slurs and tropes during this period, depicting Hindus as dirty, anti-Muslim, and barbaric.

In East Leicester, a large number of Hindu immigrants belonging to Daman and Diu, (Note: From the published accounts, it appears that these immigrants included some Christians and possibly Jews as well.) carrying Portuguese passports, are thought to have arrived in Leicester in the years preceding Brexit. They settled in the LE5 postcode area, which was otherwise predominantly Muslim. (Note: Daman and Diu are former Portuguese colonies in the Gujarat region of India. These immigrants were entitled to Portuguese passports and decided to move to Britain before the Brexit.) The celebration of Hindu festivals and public consumption of alcohol by the new arrivals were considered disruptive by Muslims living in the area. Leicester East MP Claudia Webbe stated that friction between the two communities had been "simmering for months".

At least one major incident of communitarian violence has been reported from May, where it was alleged that a Muslim man was surrounded by around 25–30 masked men, and beaten with bats and poles to such an extent that he was hospitalised. The incident was reported to the police, but the Muslim community felt that the police were failing to act, with the result that the perpetrators were still at large and continuing to harass the Muslim community. The Muslim community labelled these perpetrators "Hindutva RSS thugs" and believed that they were from among the recent arrivals from India. (Note: The police issued statement asserting that the incident continued to be under investigation in September. It was not until November that they made seven arrests in connection with this incident.) According to Majid Freeman, described as a "community activist" by The Guardian and "a key social media influencer" by NCRI, (Note: According to NCRI, Majid Freeman was previously known to have made false allegations of Quran burning. The Daily Telegraph had earlier flagged him for supporting the terrorist group ISIL. According to peace activist Chris Blackburn, Freeman led an organisation called Active Muslims Leicester. During the trials in court after the unrest, Freeman was described as a "political activist", and that his real name was Majid Novsarka.) "Muslims had made their presence known in the streets" by August and the "troublemakers had disappeared".

== Initial clashes ==
=== Cricket match brawl ===
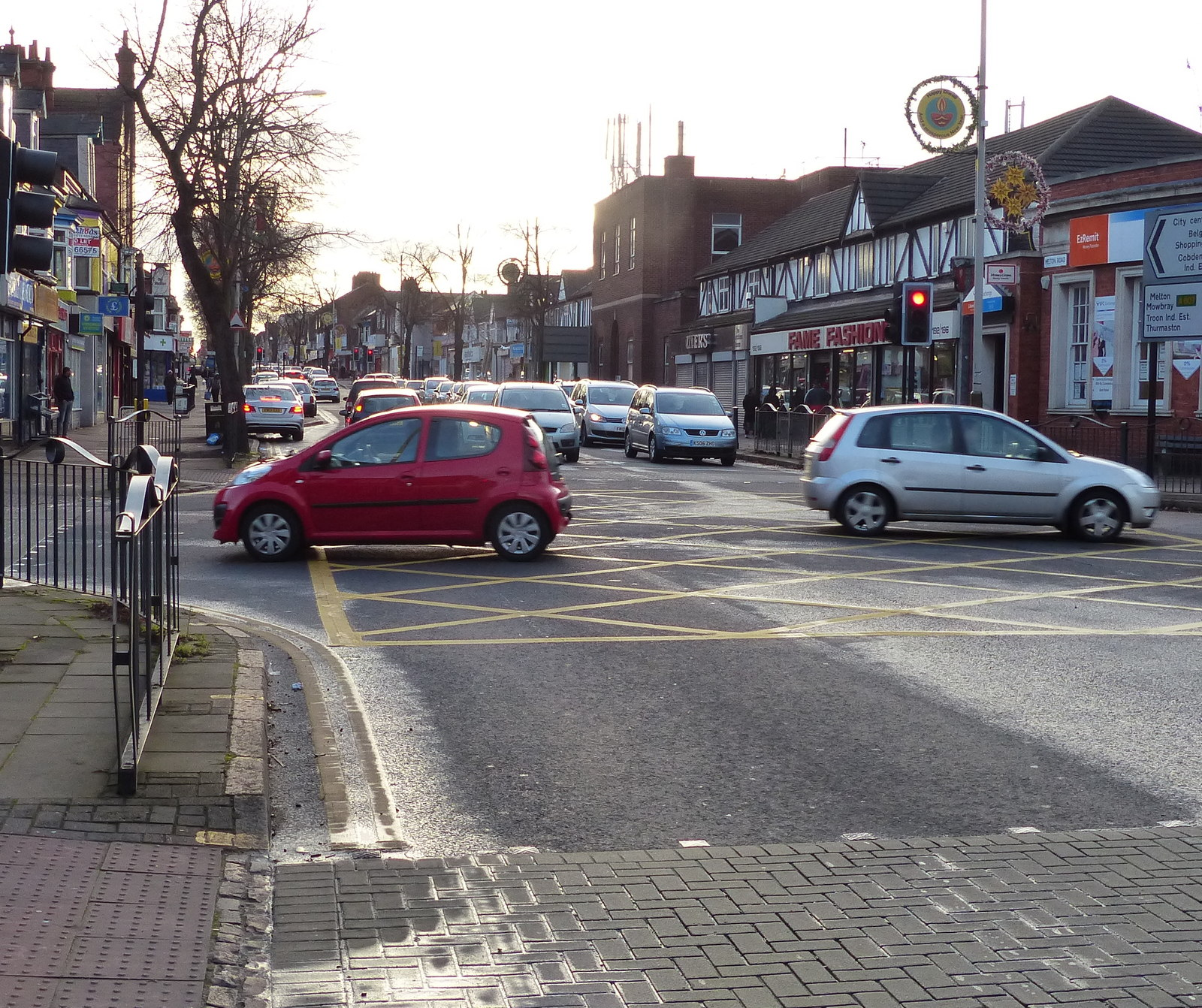
Melton Road in the Belgrave area

After the 28 August India–Pakistan Asia Cup cricket match, which India won, Indian cricket fans poured onto streets in the Belgrave area to celebrate, waving Indian flags, honking car horns and dancing to dhols. An altercation eventually occurred at the corner of Shaftsbury Avenue and Melton Road. According to a local business owner, "someone anti-India" stamped on an Indian flag, and the Indian fans thought he was a Pakistani and got infuriated. A video of this incident is available and the man is reported to be a Sikh. The altercation developed into a brawl, a video clip of which went viral on social media the next day. The clip shows a group of India fans shouting "Pakistan murdabad" (Note: The expression literally means "death to Pakistan", but as a slogan it would be interpreted as "down with Pakistan" in the subcontinent. Moreover, in the context of a cricket match, the country names India and Pakistan would be used as references to the respective teams rather than the countries. However, social media posts in the following days as well as media reports interpreted the slogan as "death to Pakistan".) and walking to the clash site. A police officer is seen arresting a man, and another group is seen beating up a man, and ripping off his t-shirt.

The incident eventually led to eight arrests, including one man arrested at the scene for assaulting an emergency worker.

=== Build-up ===
The following day a Twitter user with handle "tragicBud", whose user description included the phrase "fuck them pajeets" (anti-Indian slur), uploaded the video clip of the brawl, along with an interpretation claiming "Nazi" and "Hindutva" objectives of the participants. This was the beginning of "malicious narratives", as the NCRI researchers described it, interpreting an ordinary cricket match brawl as a "Nazi-like Hindutva" ideology. It led to a steady escalation of tensions in Leicester. A slogan of "death to Muslims" was also alleged to have been raised, but the Leicester police dismissed the claim, not finding any verifiable evidence for it.

The video clip uploaded by "tragicBud" was widely shared on social media networks, amplified by Majid Freeman, Ian Miles Cheong, Sunny Hundal, Pat McGinnes and several British conservative participants. Sunny Hundal's forwarding comment, "extreme Hindutva groups go on the rampage in Leicester", gave journalistic respectability to the anti-Hindutva narrative. The Muslim news site "5Pillars UK" announced that Muslim residents of Leicester were being attacked. British comedian and actor Guz Khan, with 100,000 followers on Twitter, called on "mandem" (UK slang for "gang") to sort out the "Modi weirdos". Other reputed organisations that address Islamophobic incidents also joined in, interpreting the video clip as representing Islamophobia. The original tweet of tragicBud received 2,037 retweets and the video clip 305,000 views. (Note: Even mainstream news organisations described the contents of the video as "ugly hostility" or "ugly scenes". Leicester Police claimed the videos showed "racist and hateful chanting", and said they were treating it as a "hate crime". Chris Blackburn, who co-authored an investigative report on the riots, pointed out that Leicester was no stranger to "cricket hooliganism", as very similar mob violence occurred after an India–Pakistan cricket match in 2017.)

=== Further clashes ===
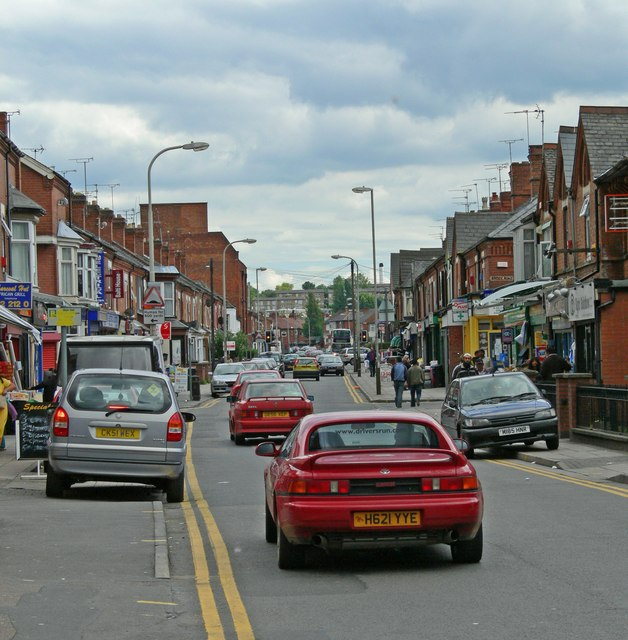
Green Lane Road in East Leicester

Between 4–6 September, anti-Hindu attacks began to be reported from Leicester. On 4 September, the date of another India–Pakistan match which Pakistan won, a Hindu home celebrating Ganesh Chaturthi (a Hindu religious festival) was allegedly attacked, eggs were thrown into the house, a Hindu male was attempted to be stabbed, and his aunt was punched in the nose. (Note: The coverage of this incident and others in the following days came from INSIGHT UK, a British Hindu and Indian organisation, often backed by video evidence. It claimed, "Amongst many incidents a Hindu home celebrating #GaneshChaturthi was attacked. Eggs were thrown into the house, attempted knifing of a young Hindu male and his aunt was punched on the nose when she came to save him." Muslim groups made a counter-allegation that a Muslim youth was attacked on the grounds of an egg-throwing accusation. This was said to have been a second attack after the May incident, and later used in the social media campaigning.) The next day, there were report of British Pakistani mobs targeting Hindu neighbourhoods, some with weapons, chanting "Modi kutta, Hindustan murdabad" ("Modi dog, Death to India"). Videos circulated of gangs roaming through the streets and police trying to block them. Hindus started feeling scared in their homes and writing to the local MPs for help.

On 5 September, there was a meeting about the incidents attended by over 300 people along with police representatives. After the meeting, a group of Muslims conducted a march through Leicester to show their "presence". It was reported that clashes and stand-offs with the police lasted till 11pm.

On 6 September, Leicester Police were authorised to use dispersal (Sections 34 and 35) and stop-and-search (Section 60) powers. They continued to patrol the areas, but further disturbances also continued.

By 11 September, 19 people had been arrested for incidents in East Leicester, one of them for threats to kill.

=== Social media campaigns ===
The Muslim social media accounts continued to propagate misinformation and the branding of Leicester Hindus as "RSS Hindutva thugs". A Muslim author Riaz Khan, with 25,000 followers, linked the incident from May to the cricket match brawl and described the participants of the latter as the same "thugs". Another user with 600,000 subscribers, advised the India fans in the UK to "humble themselves" because the Pakistani gangs over here "go a bit nuts". The most virulent misinformation came from Majid Freeman, who claimed that there was a kidnap attempt of a Muslim school girl by three Hindu men supposedly driven by "Islamophobia". He claimed that he had spoken to the girl's family and that the police had "confirmed" it. Leicester city police denied the claim quite emphatically. But the misinformation continued to circulate on social media.

A British Pakistani influencer called "Dutch Raja" (Norman Khan from Birmingham), who had 150,000 followers, forwarded a message purportedly from the girl's father along with the picture of a man standing in front of a car, claiming that he was an "RSS man" targeting Muslims, Sikhs, women and children. He started a poll asking, "Shall we go Saturday [to] teach these guys a lesson?"; 95% of the respondents voted yes. Thus, Saturday the 17th April was set as the date for Muslim mobilisation.

Many Hindus in East Leicester targeted as "RSS or BJP" men started fearing for their well-being. Some temporarily relocated to other locations; others refrained from venturing out for fear of being attacked. Some reported receiving stab wounds from the attacks during 4–6 September. One victim's mother told a TV reporter that she had experienced better Hindu–Muslim relations in Daman and Diu in India than she was finding in Leicester.

== Weekend disorder ==
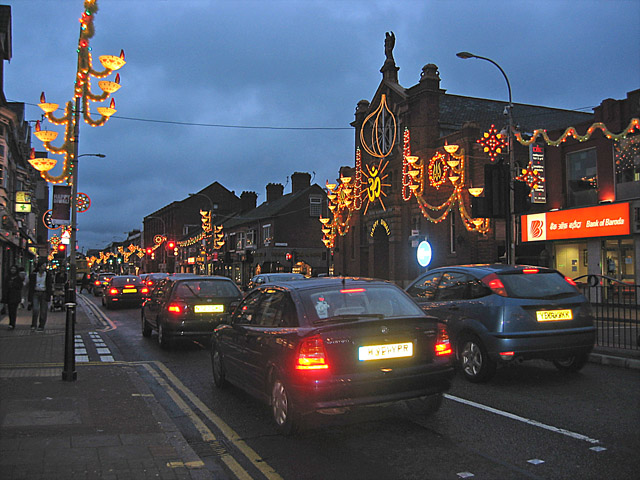
Belgrave Road, also called the "Golden Mile"

The weekend of 17–19 September, which was reserved for the funeral of Queen Elizabeth II, witnessed a large number of incidents which were described by the British press as "violent disorder".

Saturday, 17 September, began with a peace march organised by Hindus to show solidarity with the victims of the violence in the preceding weeks. The march began on Belgrave Road (which continues on to Melton Road) and followed on to Green Lane Road in East Leicester. The march is said to have been conducted on foot paths, and was overseen by the local police. Some Muslims in East Leicester said they were intimidated and felt threatened. Three slogans were reportedly used by the protesters, Jai Shri Ram, Ganapati Bappa Moriya, and Vande Mataram.

According to the police, a second "unplanned protest" was formed after this, by "groups of young men" (apparently Hindus, numbering about 200), proceeding towards Highfields. According to the Leicester Mercury, "an opposing group also gathered". Police said it numbered 600–700 men (apparently Muslims). The police scrambled about 100 officers to keep the two groups apart. Both the sides shouted slogans, with the Hindu camp shouting Jai Shri Ram and Vande Mataram, and the Muslim camp shouting "Allah-o-Akbar".

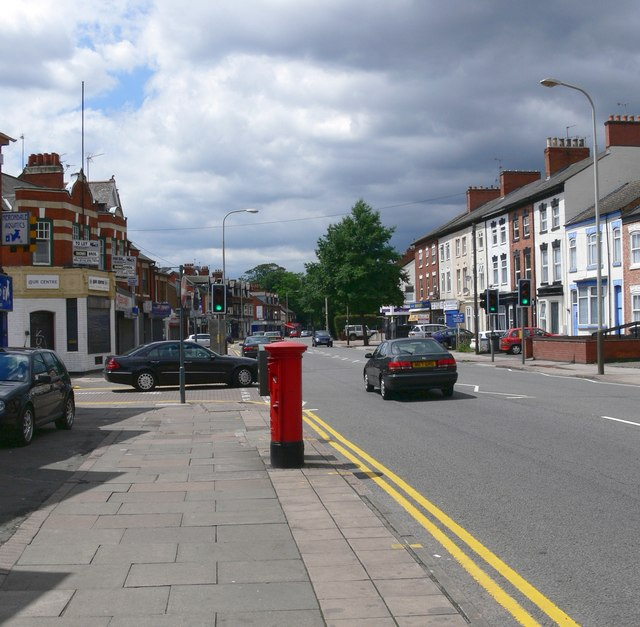
Uppingham Road, bordering North Evington

According to The Times of India, the trigger for these events was a poster created in Birmingham (following on from the fake news of kidnap and Dutch Raja's post), calling on Birmingham Muslims to participate in a protest in Leicester. Many Hindus were angered by the poster as well as baseless social media claims regarding a kidnapping attempt by Hindu youth. They marched down the Belgrave Road in protest. The two sides faced off somewhere on Belgrave Road, with the police trying to keep them apart. The police issued a dispersal order at some point, which caused the crowds to move to other locations. A number of breakout incidents then occurred, continuing through the night, with calm being restored only the next morning. The most significant event of that night was the pulling down of a saffron flag from the wall of Shivalaya (Shiva temple) on Belgrave Road and an attempt to burn it. According to a Hindu community leader, further desecration was blocked by an imam that stood guard. The police said that 16 police officers and a dog were injured during the events of that night.

On Sunday, 18 September, the police got ready for handling further disturbances by recalling officers from Queen's funeral duties in London. An unauthorised protest was held by Muslims on this day, which is said to have been widely advertised on WhatsApp. Police oversaw the march, which apparently concluded without any incident. Mohammed Hijab, an Islamist social media influencer from London, arrived in Leicester, posting videos of himself employing anti-Hindu rhetoric while leading a number of other men. According to reports, the police dispersed their march, but once again, disorder broke out at other locations, this time in North Evington. Police put in place a temporary police cordon and arrested 15 people.

On the whole, 47 people were arrested since the beginning of 28 August. Of these 11 people were reported to be from outside Leicester, one from Market Harborough, eight from Birmingham and two from London. The mayor of Leicester Sir Peter Soulsby said that the unrest was "fanned by some very distorted social media" and "a lot of people who came in from outside".

Misinformation continued to flow on social media even during the weekend. One rumour said that Hindus had attacked a mosque. Despite the police debunking the claim, it continued to circulate on social media. Another said that the Hindu temple in Ealing Road (London) arranged a bus from Angel Tours to transport Hindutva RSS members to Leicester to mobilise violence against Muslims. The claim was debunked by a journalist of The Guardian. Analysts also found anti-Muslim disinformation during the weekend, in particular a claim that a Hindu temple in Birmingham was burnt down, using images of an unrelated event.

== Birmingham events ==
Tensions continued into the following week, with the unrest spreading from Leicester to the Birmingham area on Tuesday 20 September. Video footage showed nearly 200 Muslim men surrounding the Durga Bhawan Temple in Smethwick, a neighbourhood where almost one-in-four residents are Asian, chanting 'Allahu Akbar'. They were voicing their anger at the temple for inviting a controversial Hindutva proponent, Sadhvi Rithambara, as a guest speaker. One video showed a masked man with a Birmingham accent say "RSS speakers are not welcome in Birmingham, not welcome anywhere in the UK. None of your speakers, any of the hate speakers, we are going to turn up for all of them...we've got no issues with British Hindus, we grew up with them, we know all of them. But RSS, you'll be met by us every single time".

== Reactions ==
The surge in violence took many by surprise, and senior representatives of Leicester's Muslim and Hindu communities urged calm. On Tuesday 20 September, President of the ISKCON Leicester Hindu Temple, Pradip Gajjar, said he was "saddened and heartbroken to see the eruption of tension and violence".

Labour MP Jonathan Ashworth critiqued the events as "shocking scenes of unacceptable incidents of violence", and that all "are united in calling for calm, peace and harmony".

Leicester East MP Claudia Webbe has called for cooler heads to prevail, urging strengthened "dialogue to repair community relations", while warning the violence "has the potential to spread to other areas...and has the potential to spread across the country".

Rob Nixon, Acting Chief Police Constable for Leicestershire, has noted the investigation into the unrest will run for "several months" and that "the traditional community leaders, partners [...] having a really detailed dialogue about some of these tensions, how we've got to where we are, and how we resolve them and take the issues forward."

== Studies ==
The Network Contagion Research Institute (NCRI) associated with the Rutgers University analysed the social media traffic during the clashes and reported that malicious narratives played an essential role in instigating the attacks.

A report commissioned by the Henry Jackson Society claimed that the social media instigators were "Islamist radicals". It named the alleged influencers and provided their background. It reported on the fear Leicester's Hindu community felt during the riots and their helplessness in the face of the inadequate police response against the mobs. Their report was presented in the UK Parliament.

Delhi-based Centre for Democracy, Pluralism and Human Rights (CDPHR) produced a fact-finding report and zeroed in on the issue of "ethnic enclaves" in Leicester. It said that different religious groups were living in ethnic enclaves, with some ethnicities more "clubbed up" in their spaces than the others. The report claimed that the ethnic enclaves gave rise to territorial tensions and localised majoritarianism. The report was launched in the UK House of Commons.

On 22 September, the mayor of Leicester, Sir Peter Soulsby, announced an independent review into the events of the unrest, which he said would be completed "within weeks". A month later Chris Allen of University of Leicester was named to head the review. The appointment was criticised by multiple groups, especially Hindu groups of Leicester, which said they would boycott the review. Allen then declined to undertake the role.

In May 2023, the UK government announced the formation of a panel for independent review headed by former Labour Party MP, Lord Ian Austin. The other panel members are Samir Shah, a former commissioner for the Commission on Race and Ethnic Disparities, Hilary Pilkington of the University of Manchester, a Fellow of the UK Academy of Social Sciences, and Shaaz Mahboob of NHS England, a trustee of British Muslims for Secular Democracy. Concerns have been raised by Muslim organisations regarding the choice of Lord Austin over his alleged history of Islamophobia. Austin responded stating that he was coming to the review with a completely open mind and that he genuinely wanted to help. A call for submissions of evidence was issued in May 2024.

Mayor Peter Soulsby expressed the view that neither study would be seen as "truly impartial".

== Aftermath ==
Leicestershire Police continued investigations into the events of the unrest, employing a team of 50 officers. More than 100 incidents and 6,000 hours of video footage from body-worn cameras, CCTV and phone were investigated. A total of 73 people were detained by November 2022. As of September 2023, 32 people were convicted of offences including affray, threats to kill, racial or religious public order crimes and possession of weapons; 19 cases were still pending.

Majid Freeman, who was repeatedly found to be spreading misinformation that instigated the violence, was convicted in June 2024 under section 4 of the Public Order Act 1986. (Note: Section 4 of the Public Order Act 1986 deals with threatening words or behaviour.) He was sentenced to 22 weeks in prison. The court found that Freeman intended "immediate unlawful violence" and used "abusive words with the intention that violence would be provoked". Freeman, who had offered no plea during trial, later claimed that Leicester Police targeted him instead of keeping peace during the unrest. Separately, Freeman is also charged with "encouragement of terrorism and supporting a proscibed organisation", apparently Hamas, in unrelated incidents.

In December 2024, Mohammed Hijab filed a defamation suit against The Spectator and its editor Douglas Murray for an article on Leicestor riots that allegedly defamed him. In August 2025, Hijab lost in the defamation suit. The judge ruled that Murray's article was “substantially true”, that no "significant harm" was caused to Hijab and that Hijab lied on significant issues.

In the run-up to the 2023 Leicester City Council election, the Labour Party "deselected" a large number of its councillors, i.e., denying them a Labour Party ticket for the next election. 15 out of the 26 deselected councillors belonged to the Black, Asian or minority ethnic (BAME) communities. All of the Hindu councillors were deselected. These councillors either joined the Conservative Party or decided to run as independents. In the 2023 election, the Labour Party saw its strength drop from 53 seats to 31 seats. The Conservative Party won 17 seats, up from 2 seats earlier. All three seats in Belgrave and three seats in North Evington went to the Conservatives.

The Mayor's handling of the 2022 unrest was cited by many as the reason for these developments. According to one of the deselected councillors, Hindus and Muslims lost trust in the mayor Peter Soulsby, and all those that challenged his handling were deselected. There were also moves to remove the elected mayoral model that had been in operation for 12 years, even though it was unsuccessful.

In the July 2024 general election, the Conservatives again won the East Leicester seat for the Parliament, electing a new MP, Shivani Raja.

== See also ==
- South Asian British
- British Muslims
- British Hindus
- India–Pakistan relations
- Hindu–Islamic relations
- Urban riots
