= Michael J. Altman =

American academic

Michael J. Altman is a scholar of American religious history and Asian religions in American culture at The University of Alabama. His research focuses on the development of the representation of Hinduism in the United States.

== Bibliography ==
- Hinduism in America: An Introduction (London: Routledge), 2022.
- Heathen, Hindoo, Hindu: Representations of India in America, 1721-1893, (New York: Oxford University Press), 2017.
- American Examples: New Conversations about Religion, Volume 1, ed. (Tuscaloosa, AL: University of Alabama Press) 2021.
- American Examples: New Conversations about Religion, Volume 2, ed. with Samah Choudhury and Prea Persaud (University of Alabama Press). Forthcoming December 6, 2022

== See also ==
- Hinduphobia
- David Frawley
