= Mohammed Hijab =

British Islamic preacher and influencer (born 1991)

- مُحَمَّدْ حِجَابْ
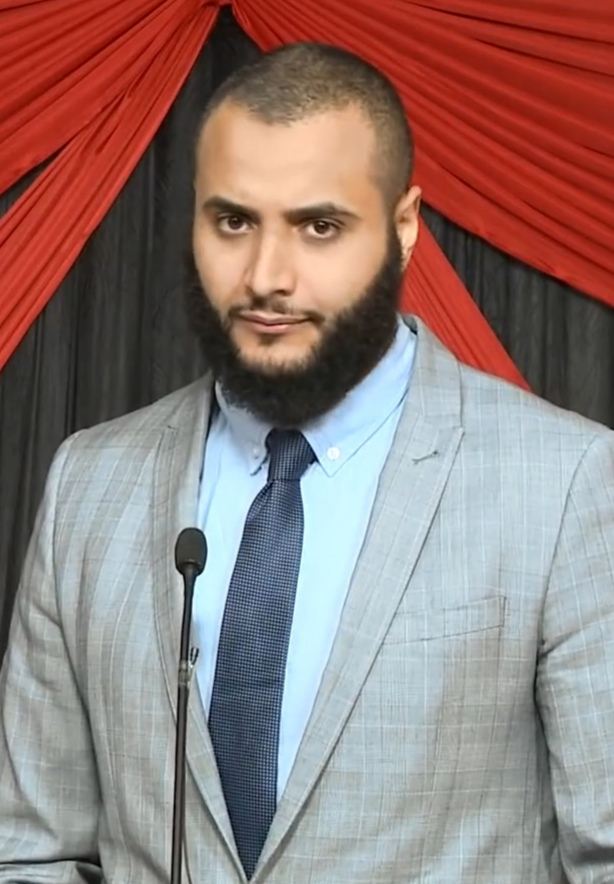
- Hijab in 2018
- Born: Mohammed Hegab; 5 October 1991 (age 35); London, England
- Education: Queen Mary University of London (BA, MA); SOAS University of London (MA); University of Oxford (MTh); Al-Azhar University (BA)
- Known for: Public debate; YouTuber; Islamic activism

Religious life
- Religion: Islam
- Denomination: Sunni
- Jurisprudence: Hanbali
- Creed: Athari

YouTube information
- Channel: @MohammedHijab
- Years active: 2015–present
- Subscribers: 1.31 million
- Views: 442.4 million
- Last updated: 21 November 2026
- Website: mohammedhijab.com

Mohamed Nabil Hegab (Note: Arabic: مُحَمَّد نَبِيل حِجَابْ, romanized: Muḥammad Nabīl Ḥijāb) (born 5 October 1991), commonly known as Mohammed Hijab, is a British Islamic preacher and YouTuber.

== Early life ==
Mohamed Nabil Hegab was born on 5 October 1991 in London, England, to Egyptian immigrant parents. He has a BA in Politics from Queen Mary University of London, a BA in Arabic and Islamic Sciences from Al-Azhar University in Egypt, an MA in Islamic Studies from SOAS University of London, an MA in history from Queen Mary University, and an MTh in Applied Theology from the University of Oxford. He is currently pursuing a PhD in the Philosophy of Religion at the University of Birmingham.

Hijab began uploading content to YouTube on 16 June 2015, starting with a video on Arabic pronunciation. In May 2018, his trainee teaching contract at Harris Academy Rainham in East London was terminated following his attendance at a freedom of speech rally in Whitehall.

== Public speaking ==
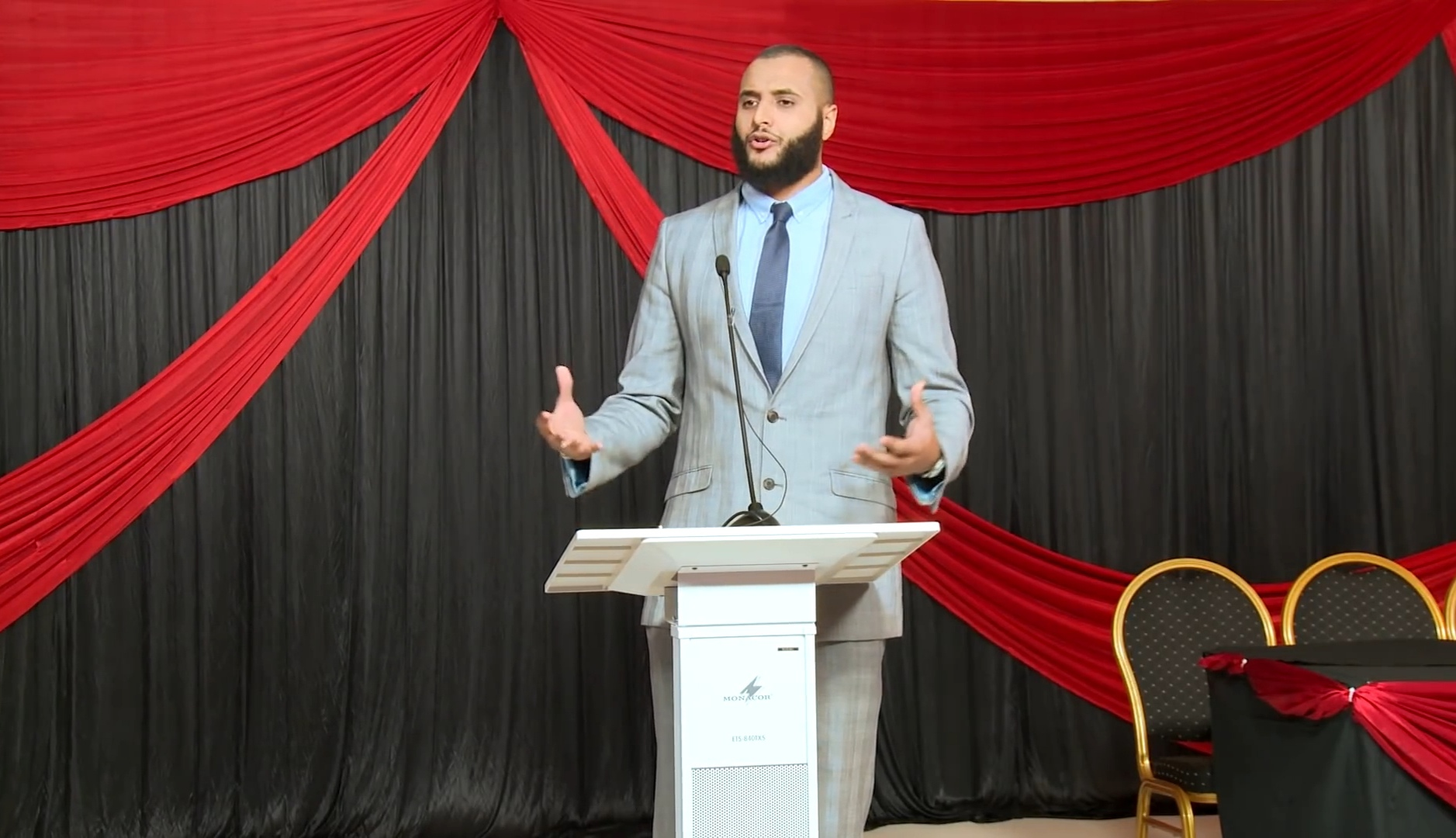
Mohammed Hijab presents an Islamic critique of liberal values at the Peace Conference Scandinavia 2018

Hijab is known for engaging in public discourse on religion, politics, and social issues through online platforms. He has interviewed and debated well-known figures including academic Norman Finkelstein in 2020, linguist Noam Chomsky in 2021, psychologist Jordan Peterson in 2021 and 2022, and online personality Andrew Tate following his conversion to Islam in 2022. With Peterson, the discussion focused on interfaith dialogue, interpretations of Islam, and the need for difficult conversations about religion. Hijab has also engaged in theological and philosophical debates with Christian apologists like David Wood in 2018, Ayaan Hirsi Ali in 2022, and William Lane Craig in 2024.

Hijab's involvement in debates concerning the Israeli–Palestinian conflict has drawn media and political attention. In October 2023, he appeared on Piers Morgan Uncensored to discuss the ongoing Gaza war. In November 2023, he debated U.S.-based Rabbi Shmuley Boteach, after which Hijab posted a tweet referencing an Israeli soldier in inflammatory terms, prompting Boteach to report the matter to U.S. authorities. Around the same time, Hijab told Anadolu Agency that Muslim leaders and populations must show greater resolve in addressing injustices in Gaza, highlighting Türkiye's potential role due to its geopolitical influence. He also accused the U.S. and EU of double standards regarding Israel's actions. In 2024, Hijab had another confrontation on Piers Morgan's show, this time with Harvard Law professor Alan Dershowitz. The debate intensified when Hijab referred to Dershowitz as a "pervert" during the broadcast. Dershowitz responded by threatening legal action for defamation, while Hijab stated that he was ready to face a lawsuit.

Some of Hijab's public appearances have faced backlash in Western countries over allegations of promoting extremist rhetoric. In March 2023, a speaking event at Trinity College Dublin, organized by Islamic student groups, was canceled due to security concerns. Critics, including student campaign groups and equality officers, objected to Hijab's association with Andrew Tate and his criticism of feminism and LGBT rights. In Canada, Hijab was scheduled to speak at the "Reviving Roots" conference in Burlington in February 2025. Still, the event was canceled after local officials, including Mayor Marianne Meed Ward, voiced concerns over hate speech. That same month, the Dutch government imposed an entry ban on Hijab ahead of his appearance at the Ramadan Expo in Utrecht, citing concerns about hate speech. The ban was overturned by a court in The Hague due to a lack of evidence. During the event, Hijab celebrated the ruling and criticized what he viewed as Western attempts to suppress Islamic voices. In Norway, parliamentarian Kjell Ingolf Ropstad raised concerns about Hijab's speech at an Islam Net event in Oslo, claiming it legitimized violence. Hijab denied the accusations and responded with a detailed rebuttal, accusing Ropstad of defamation and misrepresenting Islamic teachings on martyrdom and suicide.

== Public demonstrations ==
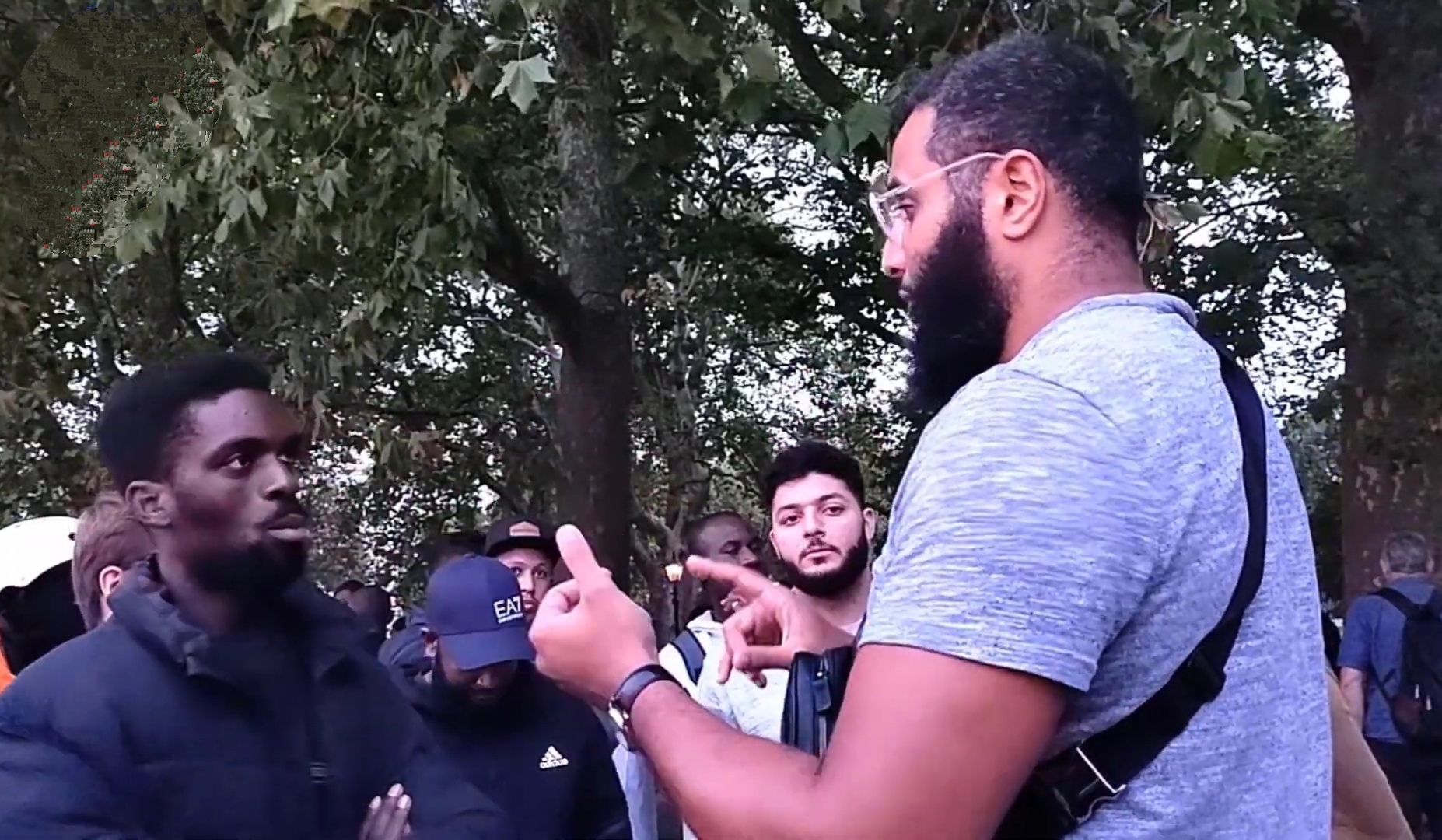
Mohammed Hijab debating with people in Speakers' Corner Discussion

=== 2022 Leicester unrest ===
During the 2022 Leicester unrest, Hijab appeared in a widely circulated video addressing a group of Muslim men in a public area, saying: "[Hindus] believe in reincarnation, what a humiliation and pathetic thing for them to be reincarnated into. Some pathetic, weak, cowardly people like that. I'd rather be an animal, I'd rather be reincarnated as a grasshopper bruv, that's the truth." The remarks were criticized as disrespectful. He also condemned the presence of individuals he described as affiliated with Hindutva ideology, prompting chants from the crowd. Hijab later stated that he did not intend to mock Hindu beliefs and apologized if his comments were perceived that way. He explained that his presence in Leicester, after traveling from London, was intended to help de-escalate tensions and discourage unlawful behavior, particularly among young people who follow his online content. On September 18, he posted a photo on Instagram showing himself walking with masked individuals, captioned "Muslim patrol in Leicester," which drew further scrutiny. That same month, The Spectator published an article alleging that Hijab exacerbated tensions, citing previous protests in which he had participated. In August 2025, a British judge ruled that the article was substantially true.

=== Advocacy for Palestinian rights ===
In May 2021, Hijab participated in a pro-Palestinian demonstration that passed through Golders Green, a predominantly Jewish neighborhood in northwest London, where he addressed passersby and condemned violence against Palestinians, referencing the Holocaust in his speeches. His remarks were reported to the Metropolitan Police by the Community Security Trust and a local synagogue, raising concerns about antisemitism. The following day, Hijab participated in a protest outside the Israeli embassy in Kensington, where he engaged with pro-Israeli demonstrators. During the event, he was recorded making remarks critical of Israel, referring to it as a "terrorist apartheid state," and making additional comments that drew criticism. He was also heard saying, "We don't care about death. We love death." The protest later moved to Speakers' Corner, where some participants were reported to have used antisemitic language. As tensions rose, Hijab was seen encouraging demonstrators to remain calm and refrain from violence, stating, "Do not provoke violence... If you're going to get excited, go to the gym."

== Reception ==
The Jewish Chronicle described him as a controversial anti-Israel campaigner and criticized the BBC for featuring him in its 2021 documentary on antisemitism. The Campaign Against Antisemitism expressed disapproval, stating, "It is astonishing that the BBC has tried to portray this man as some kind of champion of coexistence", while The Jewish Chronicle accused the broadcaster of being arrogant. In a separate editorial, the outlet asserted that the BBC had "chosen to lie and pick a fight with Jews." Jewish News labeled a 2021 video in which Hijab urged Jewish individuals on Shabbat to condemn Israel's actions as a direct act of incitement. The Campaign Against Antisemitism also compiled examples of his social media activity in a report titled Who is Mohammed Hijab? The Jerusalem Post reported on his televised debate with Shmuley Boteach, claiming that Hijab made false antisemitic and anti-Zionist claims.

According to Javad Hashmi, a Harvard University scholar of Islamic studies, Hijab belongs to a group of Muslim male influencers known as akh right bros, a reference to the alt-right, who position themselves against Western values and promote a version of Islam characterized by misogyny.

== Litigation ==
In December 2024, Hijab filed a defamation lawsuit against The Spectator and associate editor Douglas Murray, claiming the article falsely portrayed him as inciting unrest and causing reputational and emotional harm. In August, Hijab lost the defamation suit, with the judge ruling that Murray's article was "substantially true", and that no "significant harm" was caused to Hijab.
