= Sudhindra Bose =

Indian-American political scientist

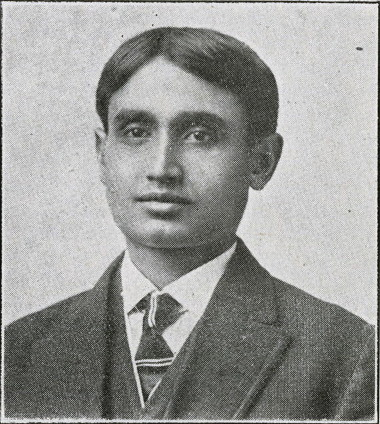
- Photo of Bose from the November 1915 issue of The Hindusthanee Student.
- Born: 1883; Keothkali, Dakha, Bengal Presidency, British India (present-day Dacca Division, Bangladesh)
- Died: May 26, 1946 (aged 63); Iowa City, Iowa, United States
- Education: University of Calcutta, Park University, University of Illinois
- Occupations: Political Scientist and Teacher
- Spouse: Anne Zimmerman

Sudhindra Bose (1883 – May 26, 1946), a pioneer in teaching Asian politics and civilization at the University of Iowa in the United States, was born in Keotkhali near Dacca, in the then Bengal Presidency.

== Early life and education ==
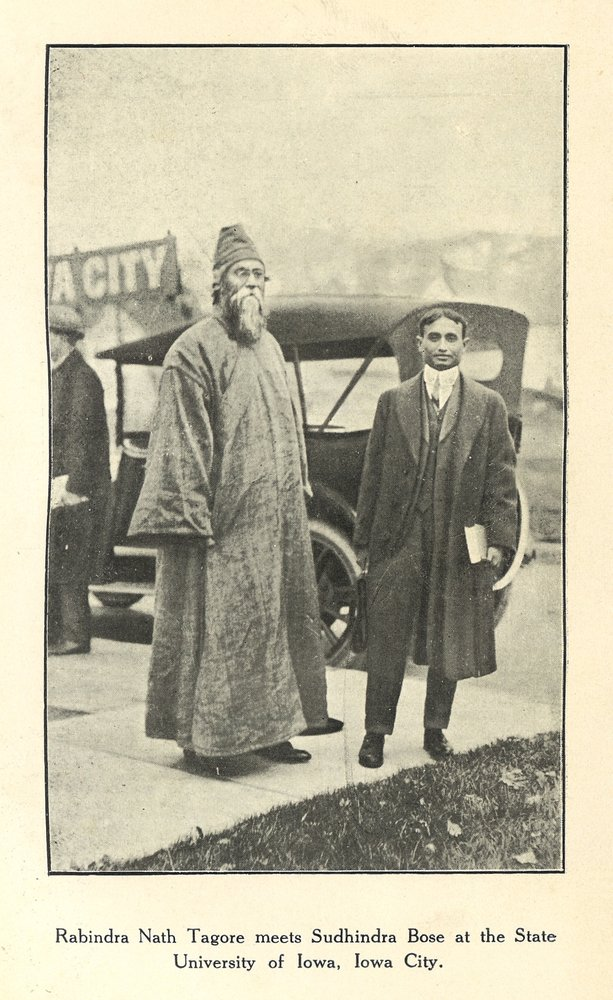
Rabindranath Tagore and Bose at the University of Iowa printed in Bose's Fifteen Years in America (1920), presumably during Tagore's visit to the United States in 1912-13.

Fifteen Years in America published in 1920 by Sudhindra Bose

Sudhindra Bose was born in Keotkhali and studied at Dacca Jubilee School, Hashara Kalikishore High English School, Munshiganj High School, and the Comilla Victoria School and Comilla Victoria College (where his brother Satyendranath Bose became principal) of University of Calcutta from 1901 to 1903. He received a John Ings Medal and moved to the United States in 1904 and enrolled as a student at Park University, Missouri, from 1904 to 1906. While at the university he worked for The Daily Maroon. He then transferred to the University of Illinois, where he earned his B.A. in 1907 and an M.A. in English in 1909.

== Academic career ==
Bose received a Ph.D. degree in political science from the University of Iowa in 1913.

From 1913 until his death in 1946, Bose was an instructor in the Department of Political Science at Iowa, first as Assistant in Political Science and then as Lecturer in Oriental Politics. He wrote four books between 1916 and 1934, as well as many articles for American and Indian periodicals.

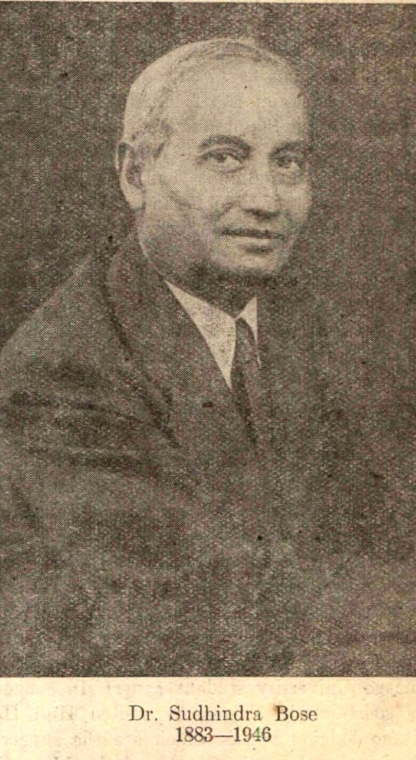
Image of Bose, published in 1948

In 1915, Bose published a rebuttal in the American Political Science Review to an article published by APSA president Frank J. Goodnow where Goodnow argued that monarchy was the most suitable form of government in China. Bose, on the other hand, argued that Asians yearned for democracy and challenged notions that Asians were fundamentally unlike Westerners in that regard.

Bose was a correspondent for the Des Moines Register. He spoke on the lecture circuit and traveled widely in Asia and Europe.

== Personal life ==
He married Swiss fellow-student Anne Zimmerman in 1927. She taught French at the University of Iowa between 1944 and 1946 and wrote a biographical note on Sudhindra following his death. He died May 26, 1946, of heart disease at the age of 63, in Iowa City, Iowa.

== Publications ==
- Bose, Sudhindra (1918), Some aspects of British rule in India Monographs University of Iowa, vol. 5, The University, Iowa City, pp. 79–81
- Bose, Sudhindra (1920), Fifteen Years in America, Arno Press, New York
