= Lee Jussim =

American social psychologist (born 1955)

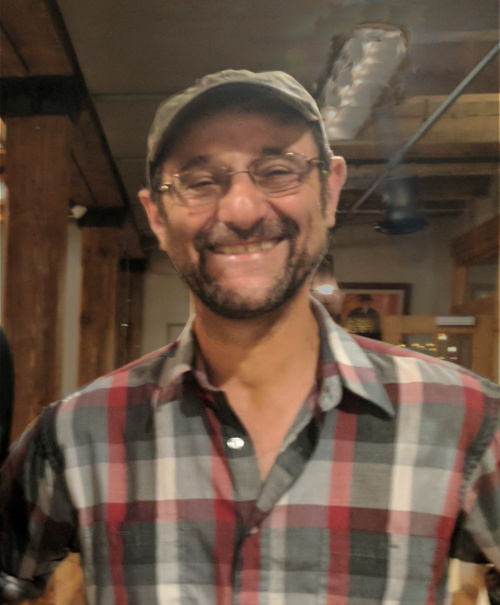
- Born: December 2, 1955 (age 70); New York City, New York, U.S.
- Education: University of Michigan
- Known for: Stereotype accuracy
- Awards: 1997 Award for Distinguished Scientific Awards for an Early Career Contribution to Psychology from the American Psychological Association
- Scientific career
- Fields: Social psychology
- Workplaces: Rutgers University
- Thesis: Interpersonal expectations in social interaction: Self-fulfilling prophecies, confirmatory biases, and accuracy (1987)

Lee J. Jussim (born December 2, 1955) is an American social psychologist. He leads the Social Perception Laboratory at Rutgers University.

== Early life and education ==
When Jussim was five years old, his family moved into a Brooklyn-area public housing; his family lived there until he was 12. When he was 13, his family moved to Levittown, Long Island, and his mother died of cancer shortly after.

Jussim dropped out of college shortly before meeting his future wife, Lisa Baum, in 1975. They have three children together. Jussim enrolled at the University of Massachusetts Boston in 1979, where he majored in psychology. He completed his doctoral degree at the University of Michigan under the supervision of professor Lerita Coleman. He graduated with a doctorate in social psychology in 1987 and entered a teaching position at Rutgers University that same year.

== Work ==
Jussim runs the Social Perception Lab at Rutgers University, Livingston Campus. The lab studies how people perceive, think about, and judge others.

Jussim has published work linking diversity training and increased perception of microaggressions.

Jussim co-authored a paper commissioned by the US Department of Health and Human Services that argued that affirmation of transgender people accelerated political violence. The paper was criticized by LGBTQ advocacy group Human Rights Campaign.
