= Network Contagion Research Institute =

American advocacy organization

- Abbreviation: NCRI
- Formation: 2018; 8 years ago
- Founder: Joel Finkelstein
- Type: Nonprofit organization
- Tax ID no.: 82-3649399 (EIN)
- Legal status: 501(c)(3)
- Headquarters: Princeton, New Jersey, U.S.
- Affiliations: Rutgers University; University of Maryland
- Revenue: $3.8 million (2024)
- Expenses: $4.1 million (2024)
- Website: networkcontagion.us

The Network Contagion Research Institute (NCRI) is an American advocacy organization that produces reports on violent extremism, disinformation, and misinformation on social media platforms and the threat they pose to the United States.

== History ==
In 2018, Joel Finkelstein founded NCRI with the aim of monitoring and analyzing hate and extremism online. Finkelstein had been a researcher at the Anti-Defamation League (ADL). A co-founder was Danit Finkelstein, who, as of 2026, is a PhD candidate in social psychology at Rutgers University working with Lee Jussim.

Following the institute's establishment, Finkelstein collaborated with John Farmer Jr., former Attorney General of New Jersey and director of Rutgers University's Eagleton Institute of Politics and the Miller Center for Community Protection and Resilience. Farmer, who had previously served as lead counsel to the 9/11 Commission, subsequently joined the institute's leadership.

In 2019, NCRI and the ADL announced a partnership focused on combating extremism and hate on social media platforms. In 2020, NCRI established a "partnership" with the conservative Charles Koch Foundation.

== Activities ==
NCRI's publications include reports on QAnon supporters, militia/boogaloo movements, antisemitism, racial supremacism, and other topics related to xenophobia. Other research areas include the study and prevention of sextortion, and child sexual abuse. In 2024, NCRI produced a report claiming that DEI programs increased workplace hostility and racial bias.

NCRI has published reports on the dissemination of disinformation from state actors, including Iran, Russia, and China.

=== Anarcho-socialist networks ===
In a 2020 report, Network-Enabled Anarchy: How Militant Anarcho-Socialist Networks Use Social Media to Instigate Widespread Violence Against Political Opponents and Law Enforcement, NCRI claimed that the left-wing and right-wing extremist used parallel tactics and messaging. NCRI acknowledged that far-left groups have caused far less violence in the United States than far-right groups. However, NCRI argues that "anacho-socialist [sic] extremists" and "antifa" shared common themes & tactics with far-right "Boogaloo", and "Jihadi extremism": "Apocalyptic beliefs", an "organized militia", "martyr narratives", and "lone wolf terror attacks". In 2020, media scholar Jack Bratich criticized NCRI for labelling dissenters as violent threats.

NCRI also claimed that "violent anarcho-socialist networks played an active online role in preparing for and coordinating real world riots nation-wide". In 2021, Matthew Lyons of anti-fascist project Three Way Fight criticized NCRI blaming the riots after the George Floyd protests on "anarcho-syndicalist extremists" who "mobilize[d] lawlessness and violence" and labelled NCRI a "mouthpiece for the state security apparatus".

=== Democratic Socialists of America ===
In 2026, NCRI wrote that the Democratic Socialists of America (DSA) "acts as an unregistered foreign agent inside the United States" and "coordinates with hostile foreign states" to foment "domestic unrest". NCRI suggested that DSA should be investigated for "compliance" under the Foreign Agents Registration Act. As proof, NCRI said that groups of DSA members have visited Venezuela, Cuba, or China "six" times in the past 6 years, including "self-organized" visits. DSA has 100,000 members.

On February 10, 2026, the House Ways and Means Committee invited NCRI to testify at a hearing titled "Unmasking Threats from Beijing and Beyond" about "foreign influence" in American nonprofits. NCRI founder Adam Sohn wrote that: "DSA chapters play a central organizing role in nationwide anti-ICE protests." Sohn said that DSA is an "increasingly consequential threat vector", because it supports "foreign-aligned narratives" and "undermine[s] public legitimacy for core state functions". Ken Klippenstein labelled this a "McCarthyite campaign against DSA".

== Funding ==
Jack Poulson of the Disruption Network Institute describes NCRI as part of a network of zionist, "anti-BDS advocacy and lawfare organizations".

In 2020, NCRI funders included the liberal Open Society Foundations of George Soros, the conservative Charles Koch Foundation and the anti-bigotry and zionist Anti-Defamation League.

In 2021, NCRI was paid $335,000 by the anti-BDS Israel on Campus Coalition (ICC), which conducts self-described "psychological warfare" on pro-BDS students using Blend AI. ICC provides information about pro-Palestinian students to the Israeli Ministry of Strategic Affairs.

In 2022, Israeli businessman Eran Teboul stated that his anti-BDS organization Hetz for Israel has privately raised funds for NCRI. NCRI founder Joel Finkelstein is a director of Hetz.

In 2023, the Ruderman Family Foundation paid NCRI to conduct a study about anti-Semitism on Twitter. NCRI's report found "that anti-Zionist campaigns and narratives on Twitter are largely antisemitic". RFF, which is based in the US and in Israel, works to "solidify the relationship of the State of Israel with American Jewry".

In 2026, Joel Finkelstein said that all NCRI donors are "U.S. citizens".

== See also ==
- Anti-Defamation League
- Charles Koch Foundation
- Open Society Foundations
