= Hindutva Harassment Field Manual =

Resource manual

The Hindutva Harassment Field Manual offers educational and practical resources for the targets, allies, students, and employers of Hindutva-led assaults. It was written and is maintained by the South Asia Scholar Activist Collective.

The manual was published in 2021, a year that saw Hindutva attacks on North American academics accelerate significantly, including violent threats. Free Expression groups, including PEN America flagged this issue. Scholars have placed the Field Manual within a larger "anti-Hindutva discourse" that organized in online spaces in 2021.

== Reception ==
The field manual has been received positively by academics and negatively by Hindutva-aligned group. For example, it was cited in a 2023 Research Council report at the University of Massachusetts that recommended steps for addressing "public harassment and defamation of faculty." A University of Chicago professor noted in 2024 that the field manual was helpful for addressing politically-motivated complaints against United States-based scholars whose work "is inconvenient for the RSS narrative." In contrast, the Hindu American Foundation, a Hindutva organisation, included the manual within a Title VI complaint against the University of Pennsylvania.

== Timeline of Harassment ==
One section of the field manual documents Hindu Right attacks on the North American academy dating back to the mid-1990s. This section was published in the Journal of the American Academy of Religion in 2022.
