= Arcade (architecture) =

Row of arches

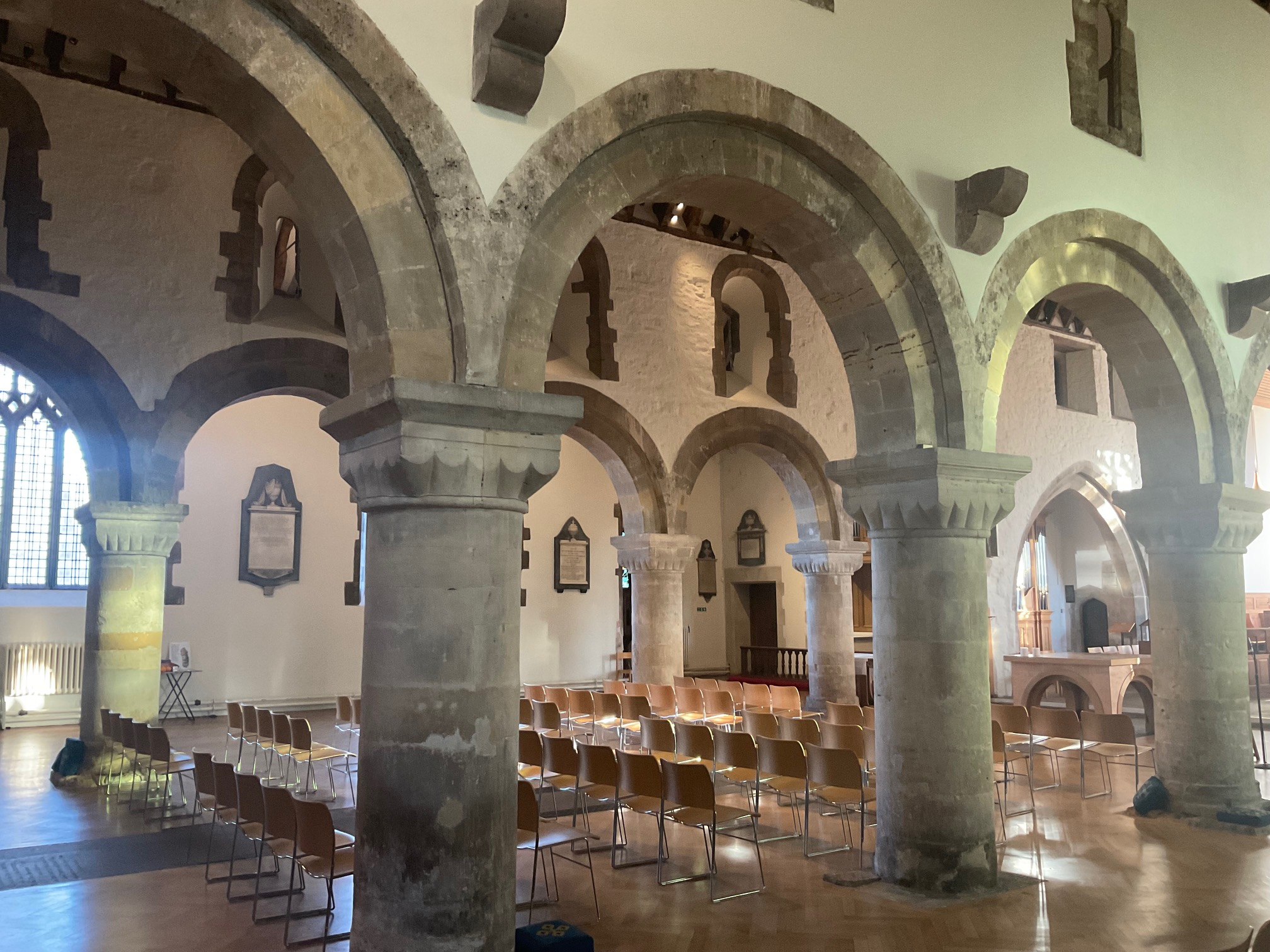
Norman arcades in Newport Cathedral.

An arcade is a succession of contiguous arches, with each arch supported by a colonnade of columns or piers. Exterior arcades are designed to provide a sheltered walkway for pedestrians; they include many loggias, but here arches are not an essential element. An arcade may feature arches on both sides of the walkway. Alternatively, a blind arcade superimposes arcading against a solid wall.

Blind arcades are a feature of Romanesque architecture that influenced Gothic architecture. In the Gothic architectural tradition, the arcade can be located in the interior, in the lowest part of the wall of the nave, supporting the triforium and the clerestory in a cathedral, or on the exterior, in which they are usually part of the walkways that surround the courtyard and cloisters.

A different, related meaning is "a covered passage with shops on one or both sides". Many medieval open arcades housed shops or stalls, either in the arcaded space itself, or set into the main wall behind. From this, "arcade" has become a general word for a group of shops in a single building, regardless of the architectural form.

The word "arcade" comes from French arcade from Provençal arcada or Italian arcata, based on Latin arcus, ‘bow’ (see arc and arch).

A related but ambiguous term is arcature, which is either a small arcade or a blind arcade.

== History ==
Arcades go back to at least the Ancient Greek architecture of the Hellenistic period, and were much used by the Romans, for example at the base of the Colosseum. Church cloisters very often use arcading. Islamic architecture very often uses arcades in and outside mosques in particular. In Renaissance architecture elegant arcading was often used as a prominent feature of facades, for example in the Ospedale degli Innocenti (commissioned 1419) or the courtyard of the Palazzo Bardi, both by Filippo Brunelleschi in Florence.

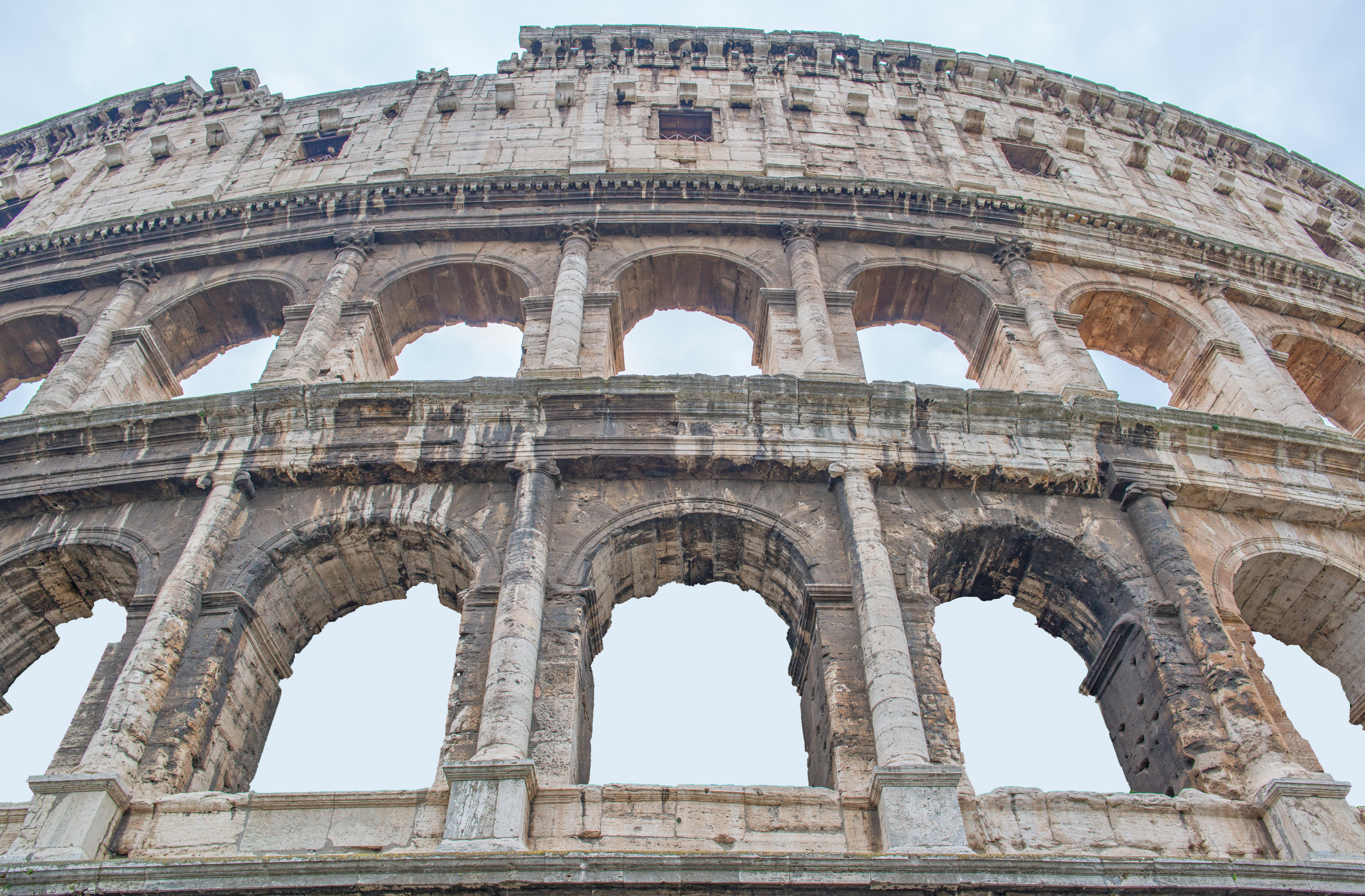
Arcades of the Colosseum (AD 70s) from the outside

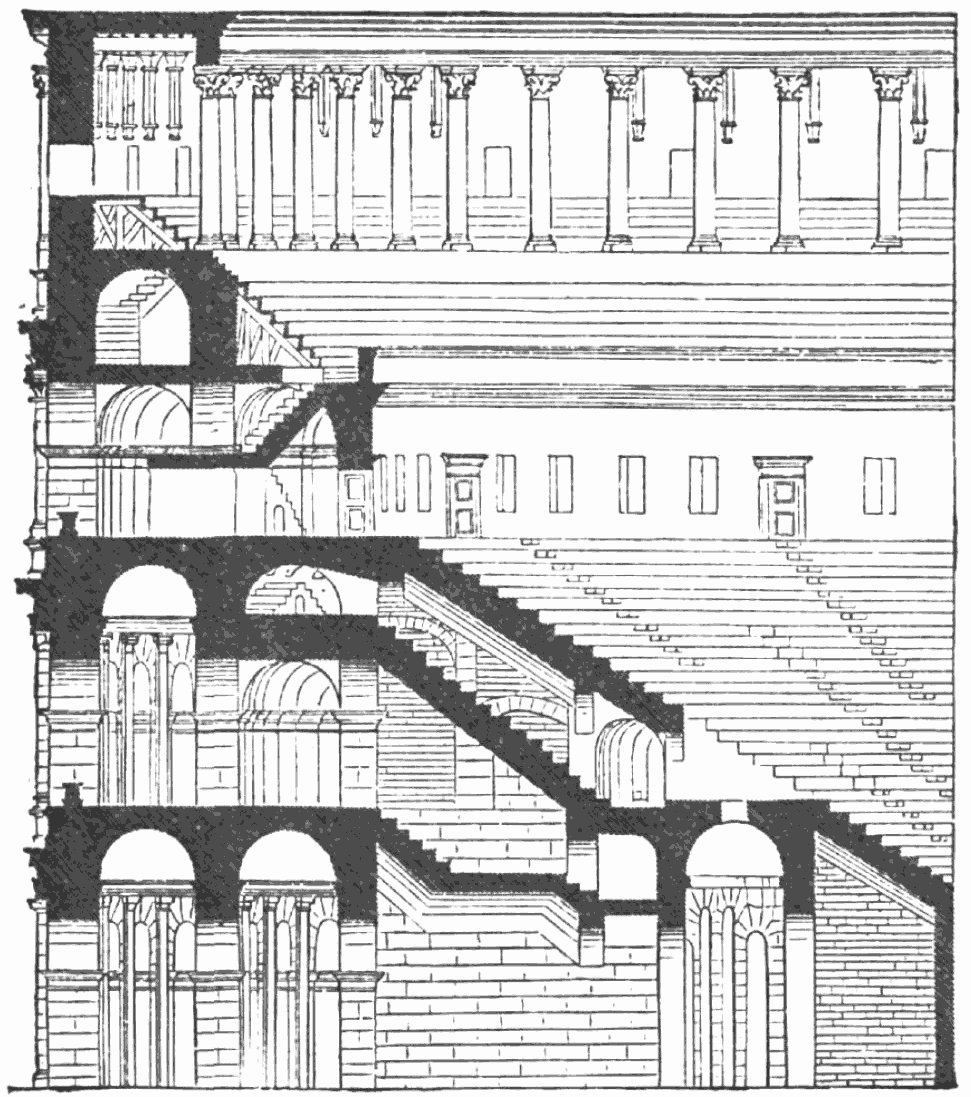
...and in cross-section

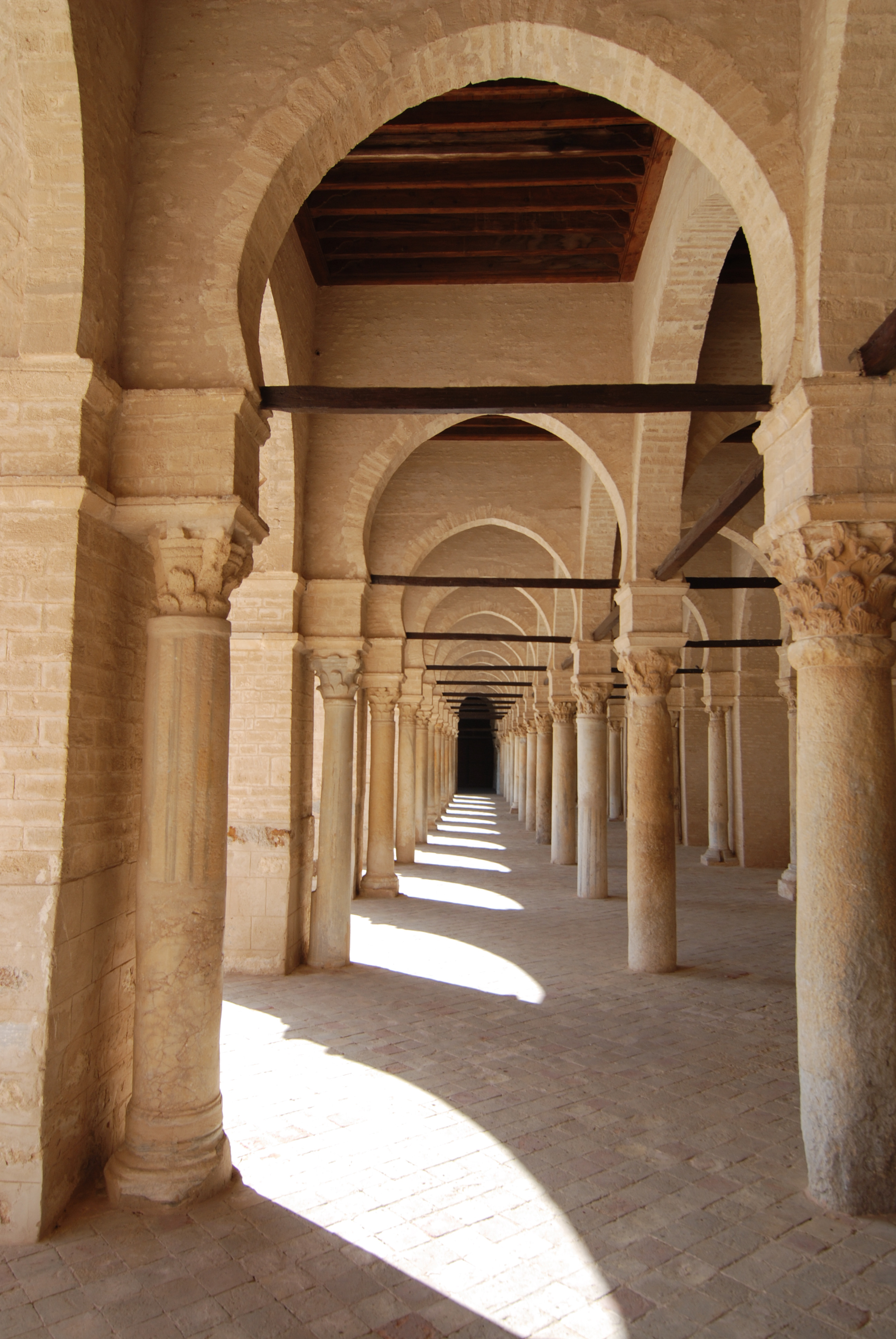
Arcades inside the Mosque of Uqba, also known as the Great Mosque of Kairouan, in Tunisia (670). There is no vaulting; the arches are bridged by wooden beams

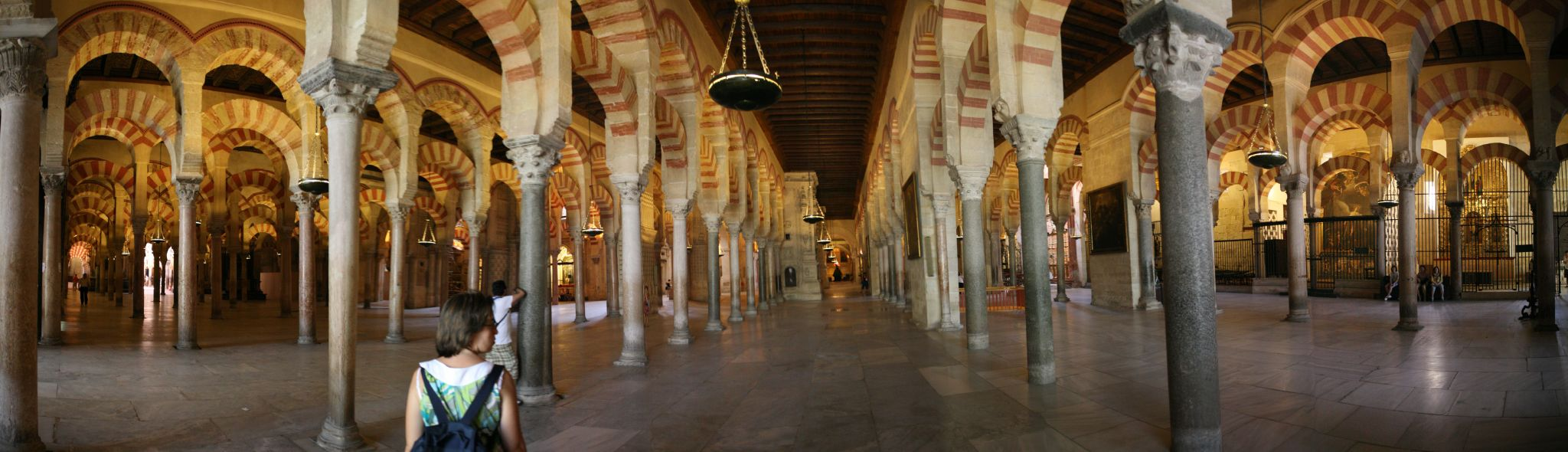
These arcades in Córdoba were begun in the 780s; Some are topped by beams, others by barrel vaults.

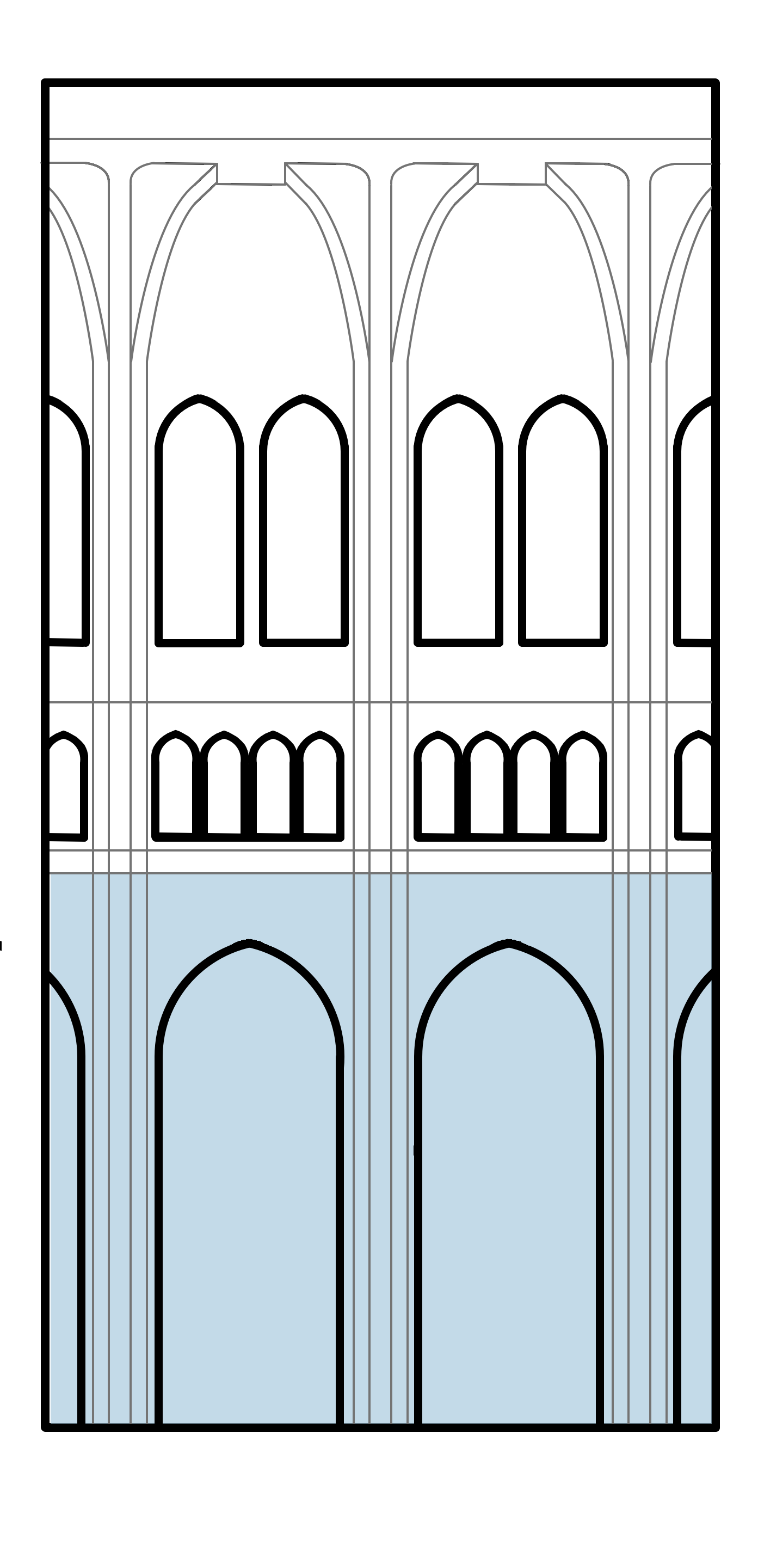
Interior elevation of a Gothic cathedral, with the side-aisle arcade highlighted. The triforium and clerestory above also have arcades.

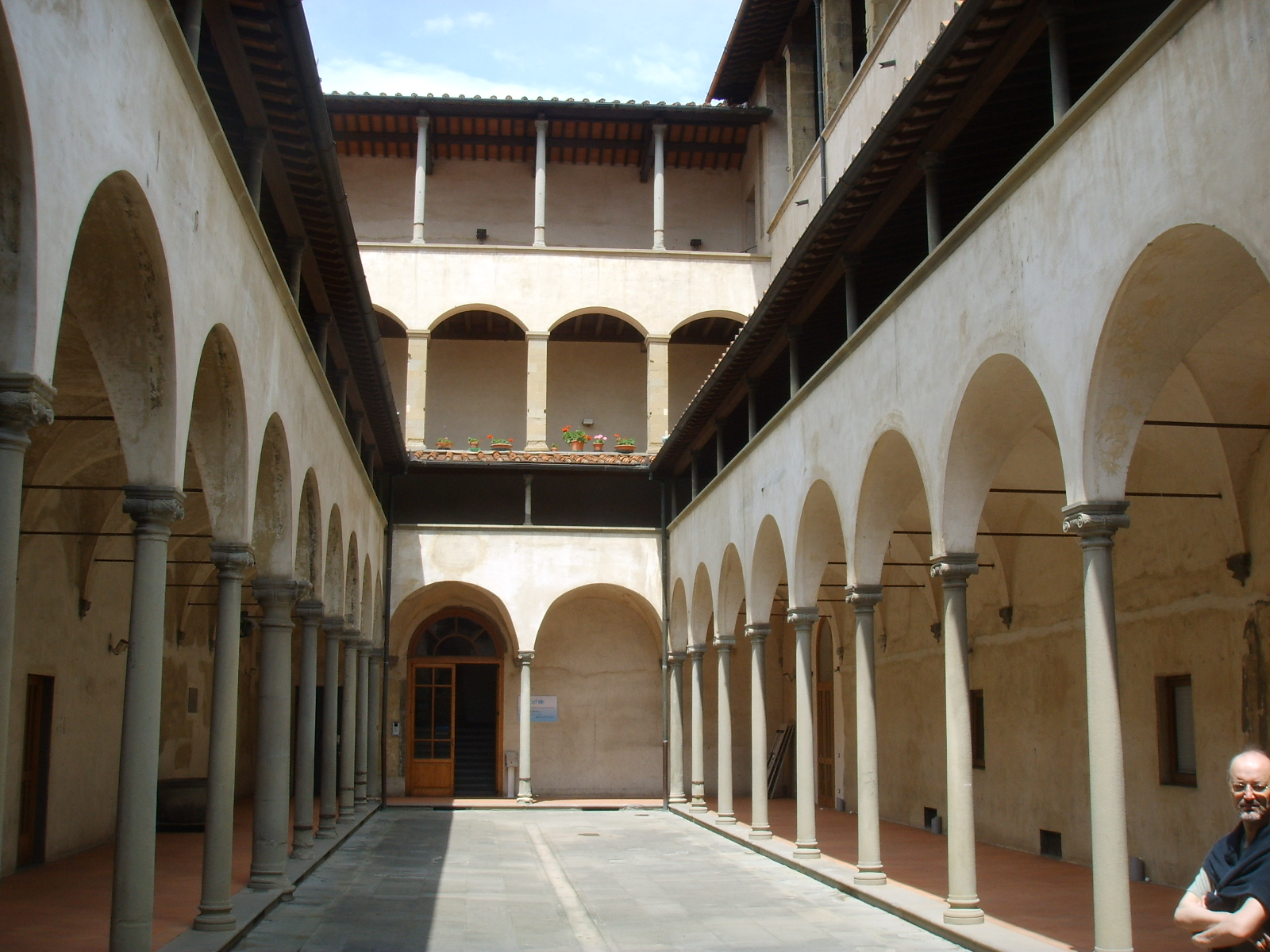
The women's cloister at the Ospedale degli Innocenti, 1420s and 30s. The topmost story has a colonnade, but not an arcade, as there are no arches

Blind arcade in Ely Cathedral.

== Shopping arcades ==
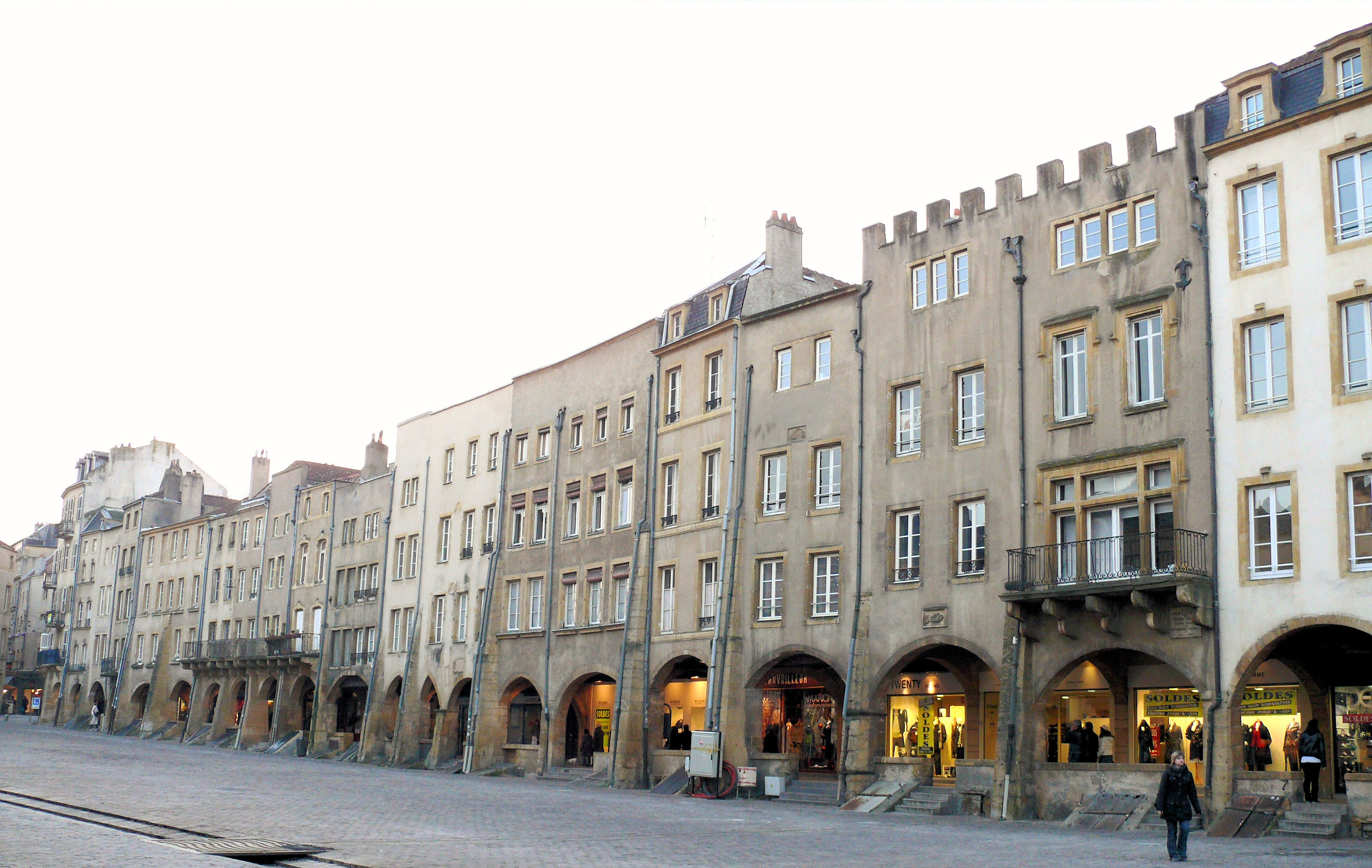
Arcade with shops behind, running along a row of originally High Medieval houses in Metz, France.

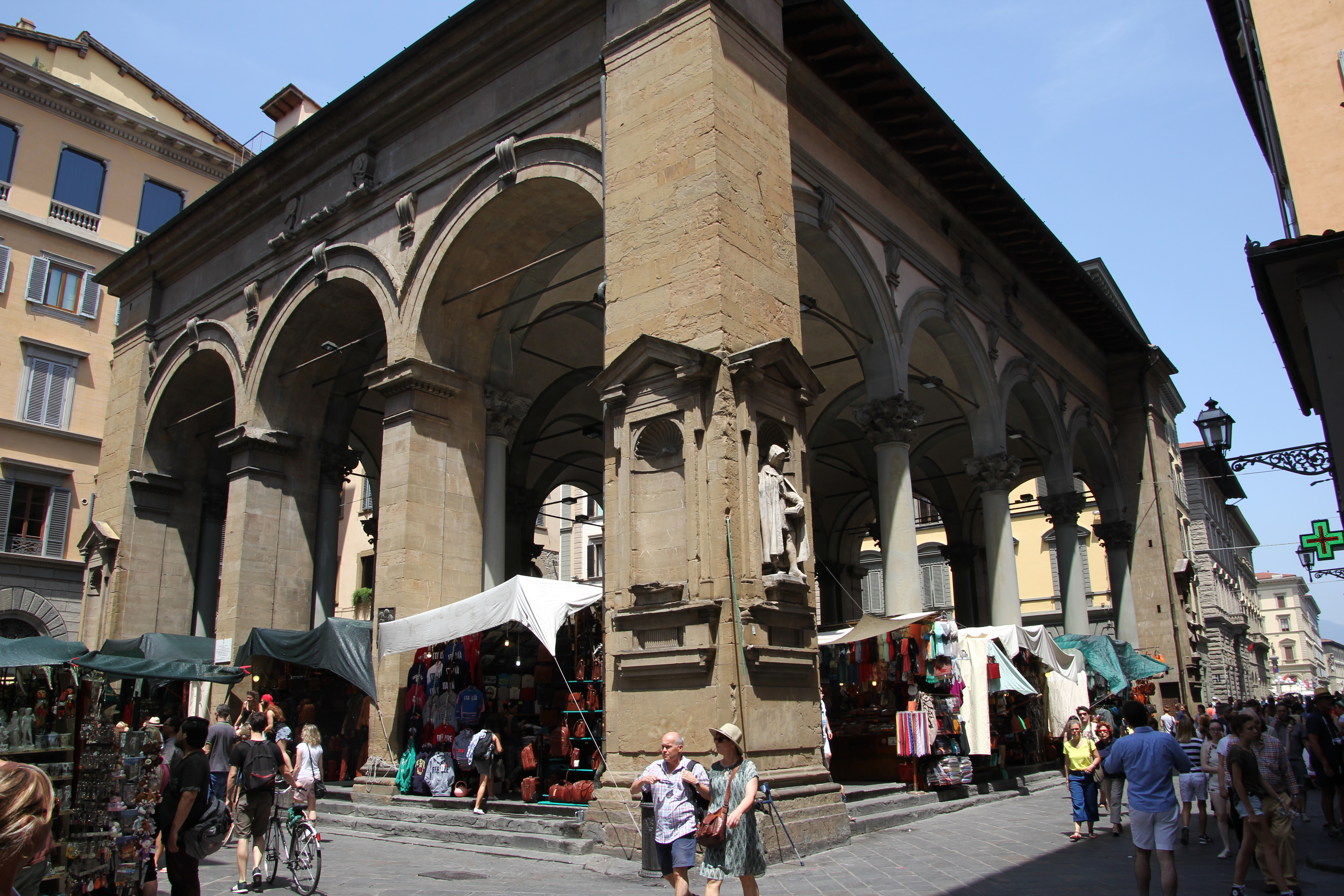
Loggia del Mercato Nuovo, Florence, Italy

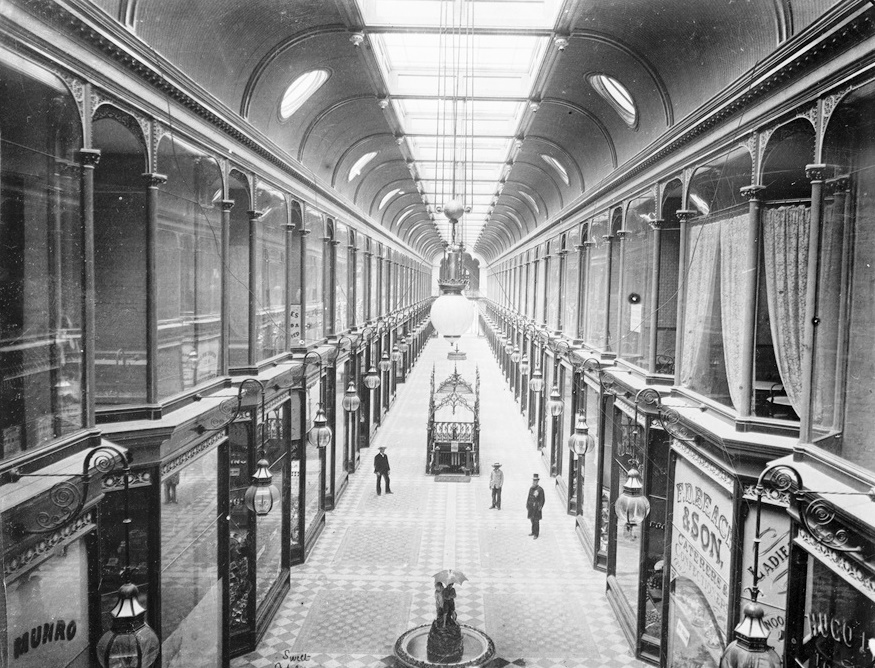
Adelaide Arcade in Adelaide, South Australia, c. 1886.

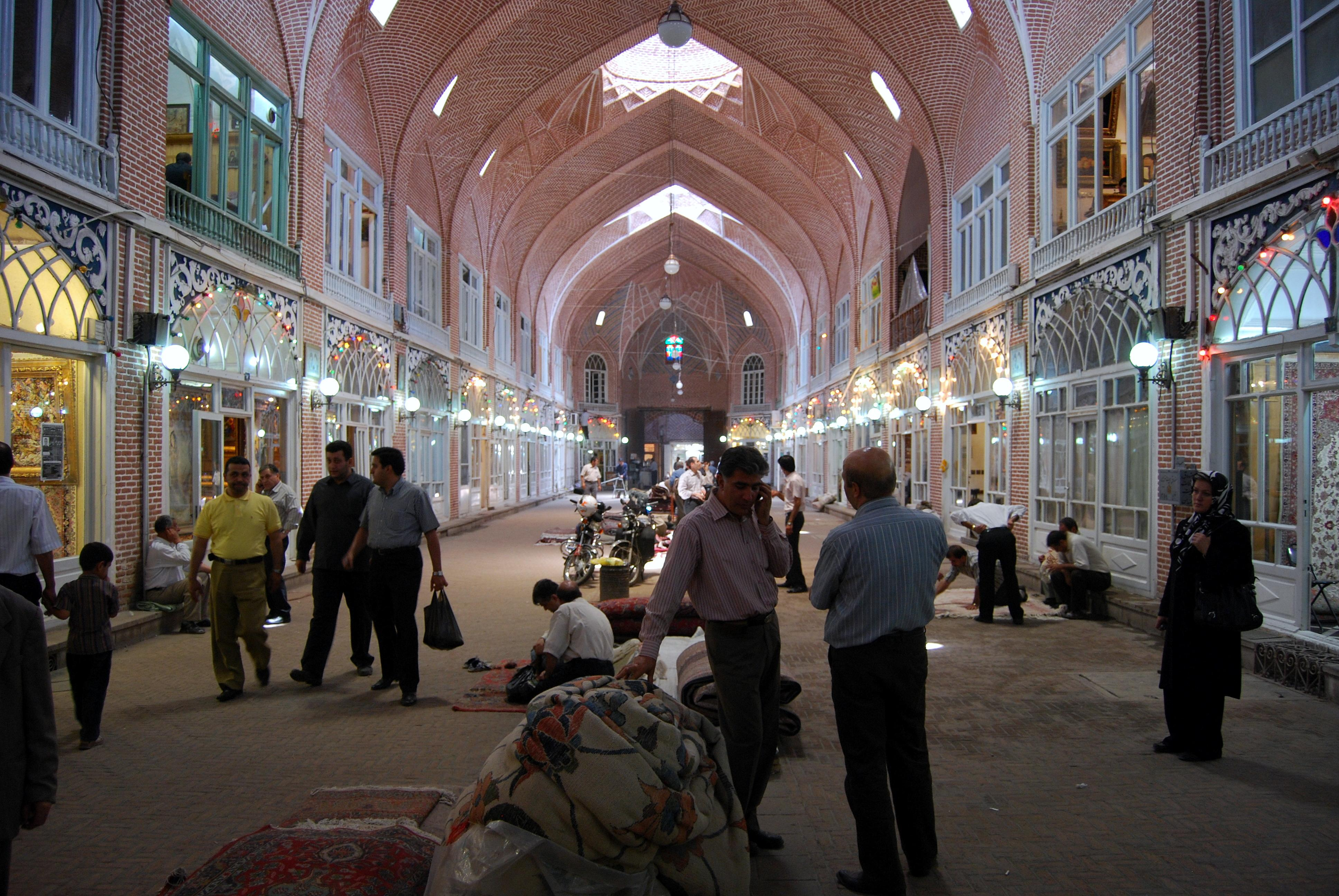
Mozaffarieh: Tabriz Bazaar, Iran, devoted to carpet selling.

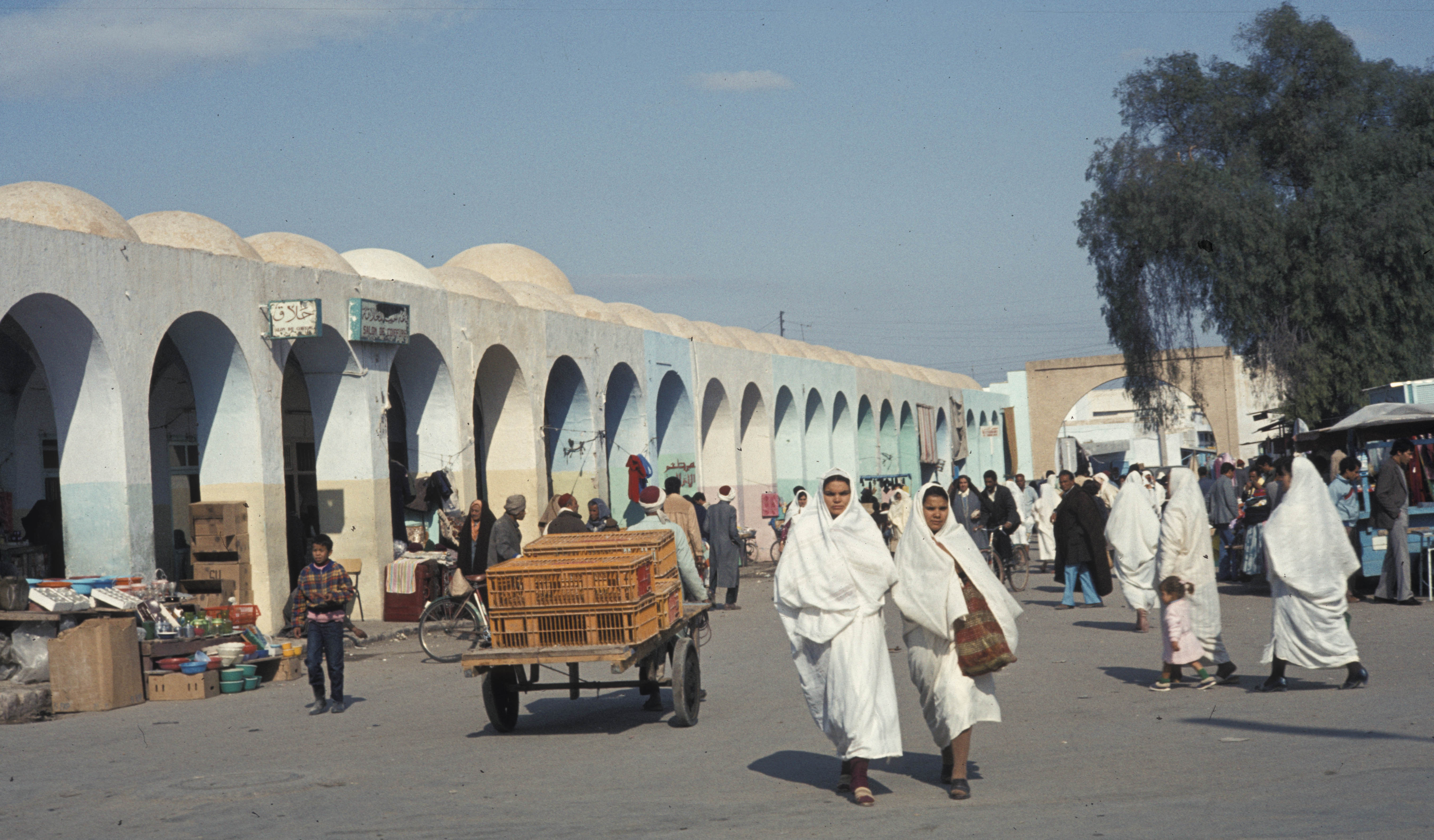
Dome-topped arcade in a Tunisian souq

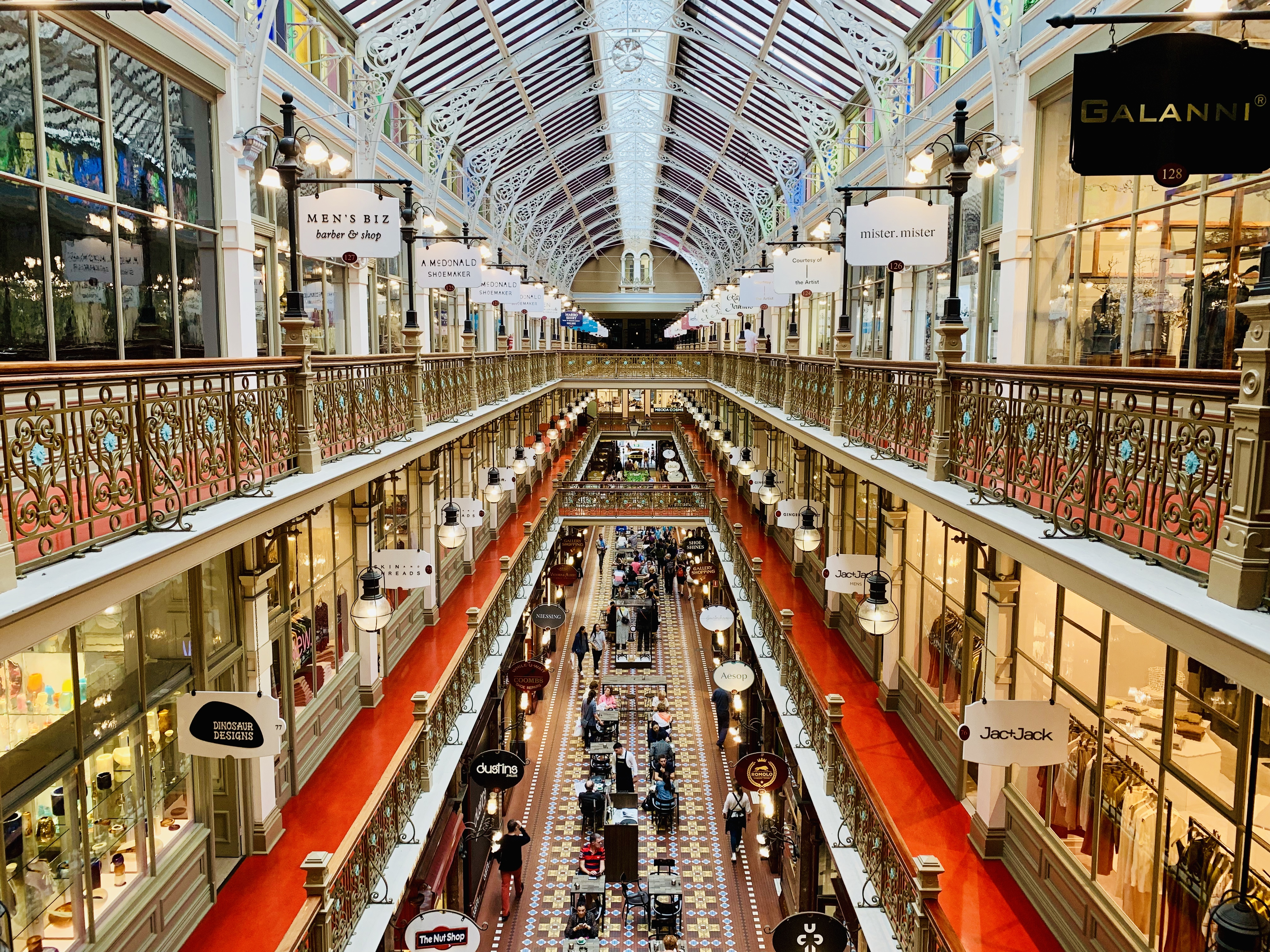
The Strand Arcade in Sydney CBD, Australia, opened 1892

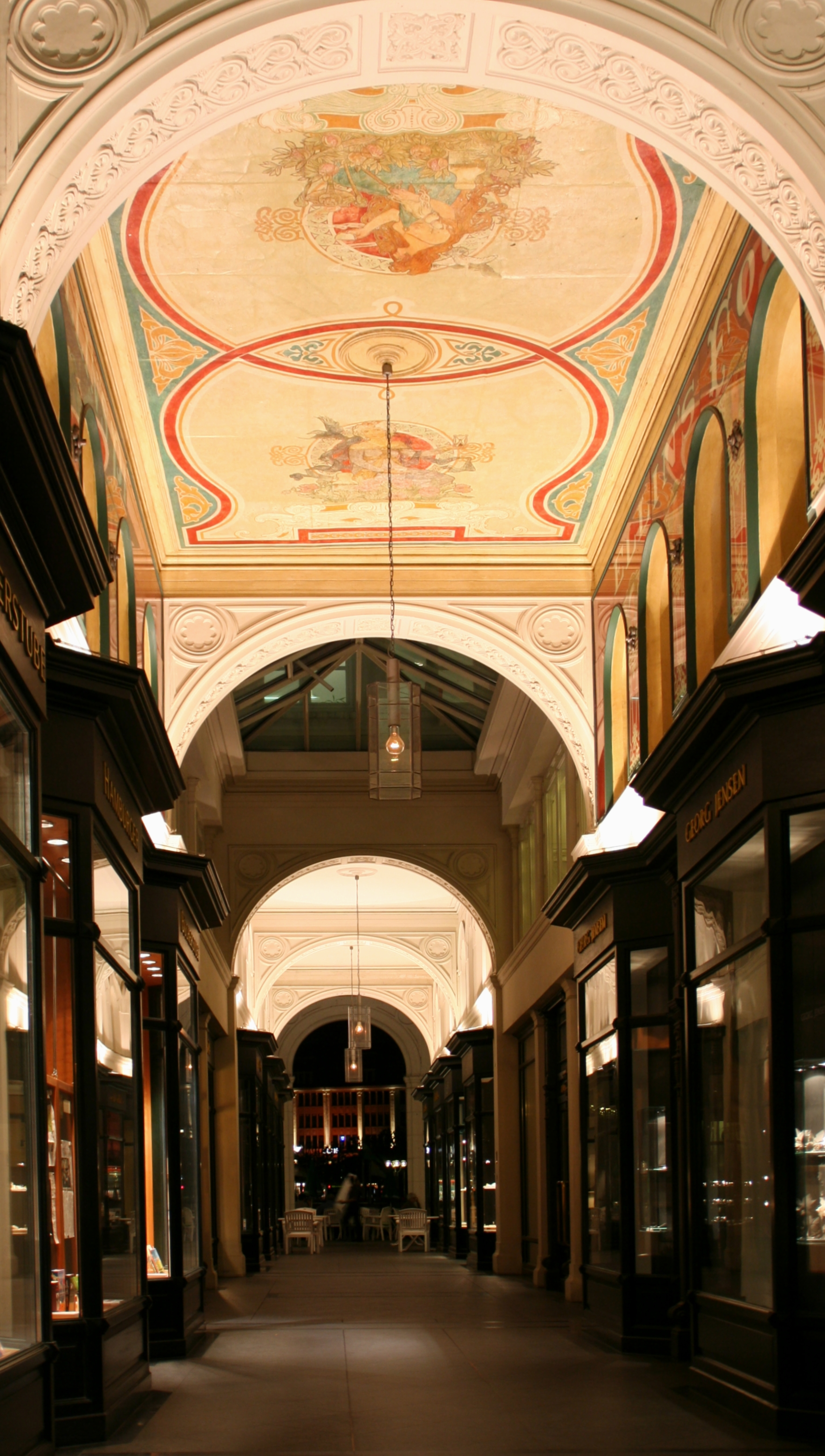
The Mellin-Passage shopping arcade Neuer Wall street in Hamburg, Germany

The French architect, Bertrand Lemoine, described the period, 1786 to 1935, as l’Ère des passages couverts (the Arcade Era). He was referring to the grand shopping "arcades" that flourished across Europe during that period. A shopping arcade refers to a multiple-vendor space, operating under a covered roof. Typically, the roof was constructed of glass to allow for natural light and to reduce the need for candles or electric lighting. The 18th- and 19th-century arcades were designed to attract the genteel middle classes. In time, these arcades came to be the place to shop and to be seen. Arcades offered shoppers the promise of an enclosed space away from the chaos that characterised the noisy, dirty streets; a warm, dry space away from the harsh elements, and a safe haven where people could socialise and spend their leisure time. As thousands of glass covered arcades spread across Europe, they became grander and more ornately decorated. By the mid-19th century, they had become prominent centres of fashion and social life. Promenading in these arcades became a popular 19th-century pastime for the emerging middle classes.

The inspiration for the grand shopping arcades may have derived from the fashionable open loggias of Florence however medieval vernacular examples known as 'butterwalks' were traditional jettied colonnades in British and North European marketplaces; examples remain for example in Totnes and Dartmouth in Devon. During the 16th century, a pattern of market trading using mobile stalls under covered arcades was established in Florence, from where it spread throughout Italy. Examples of the earliest open loggias include: Mercato Nuovo (1547) by Giovanni Battista del Tasso (and funded by the Medici family); Mercato Vecchio, Florence by Giorgio Vasari (1567) and Loggia del Grano (1619) by Giulio Parigi.

Arcades soon spread across Europe, North America and the antipodes. Examples of these grand shopping arcades include: Palais Royal in Paris (opened in 1784); Passage de Feydeau in Paris (opened in 1791); London's Piccadilly Arcade (1810) and Milan's Galleria Vittorio Emanuele (1878). Some examples of arcades in North America include New York's Paddock Arcade (1850), Ohio's Dayton Arcade (1904), and Rhode Island's Westminster Arcade (1828). Other notable 19th-century grand arcades include the Royal Saint-Hubert Galleries in Brussels, which were inaugurated in 1847, and Istanbul's Çiçek Pasajı, opened in 1870. Shopping arcades were the precursor to the modern shopping mall, and the word "arcade" is now often used for malls which do not use the architectural form at all.

The Palais-Royal, which opened in 1784 and became one of the most important marketplaces in Paris, is generally regarded as the earliest example of the grand shopping arcades. Originally, a royal palace, the complex consisted of gardens, shops and entertainment venues situated under the original colonnades. The area boasted some 145 boutiques, cafés, salons, hair salons, bookshops, museums, and numerous refreshment kiosks as well as two theatres. The retail outlets specialised in luxury goods such as fine jewellery, furs, paintings and furniture designed to appeal to the wealthy elite. Retailers operating out of the Palais complex were among the first in Europe to abandon the system of bartering, and adopt fixed-prices thereby sparing their clientele the hassle of bartering. Stores were fitted with long glass exterior windows which allowed the emerging middle-classes to window shop and indulge in fantasies, even when they may not have been able to afford the high retail prices. Thus, the Palais-Royal became one of the first examples of a new style of shopping arcade, frequented by both the aristocracy and the middle classes. It developed a reputation as being a site of sophisticated conversation, revolving around the salons, cafés, and bookshops, but also became a place frequented by off-duty soldiers and was a favourite haunt of prostitutes, many of whom rented apartments in the building.

One of the earliest British examples of a shopping arcade, the Covered Market, Oxford, England was officially opened on 1 November 1774 and is still active today. The Covered Market was started in response to a general wish to clear "untidy, messy and unsavoury stalls" from the main streets of central Oxford. John Gwynn, the architect of Magdalen Bridge, drew up the plans and designed the High Street front with its four entrances. In 1772, the newly formed Market committee, half of whose members came from the town and half from the university, accepted an estimate of nine hundred and sixteen pounds ten shillings, for the building of twenty butchers' shops. Twenty more soon followed, and after 1773 meat was allowed to be sold only inside the market. From this nucleus the market grew, with stalls for garden produce, pig meat, dairy products and fish.

Gostiny Dvor in St Petersburg, Russia is another early shopping arcade and remains the largest shopping center in the city. Gostiny Dvor translates into Merchants' Arcade. Building commenced in 1757 to an elaborate design by Bartolomeo Rastrelli, but that subsequently was discarded in favour of a less expensive and more functional Neoclassical design submitted by Jean-Baptiste Vallin de la Mothe (1729–1800). Throughout the following century, Gostiny Dvor was augmented, resulting in ten indoor streets and as many as 178 shops by the 20th century. During the post-World War II reconstructions, its inner walls were demolished and a huge shopping mall came into being. This massive 18th-century structure got a face-lift recently and entered the 21st century as one of the most fashionable shopping centres in Eastern Europe.

An early French arcade is the Passage du Caire created in 1798 as a tribute to the French campaign in Egypt and Syria. It was appreciated by the public for its protection from the weather, noise and filth of the streets. A year later American architect William Thayer created the Passage des Panoramas with a row of shops passing between two panorama paintings. Shopping arcades increasingly were built in the second Bourbon Restoration. Upper levels of arcades often contained apartments and sometimes brothels.

== Shopping arcades globally ==
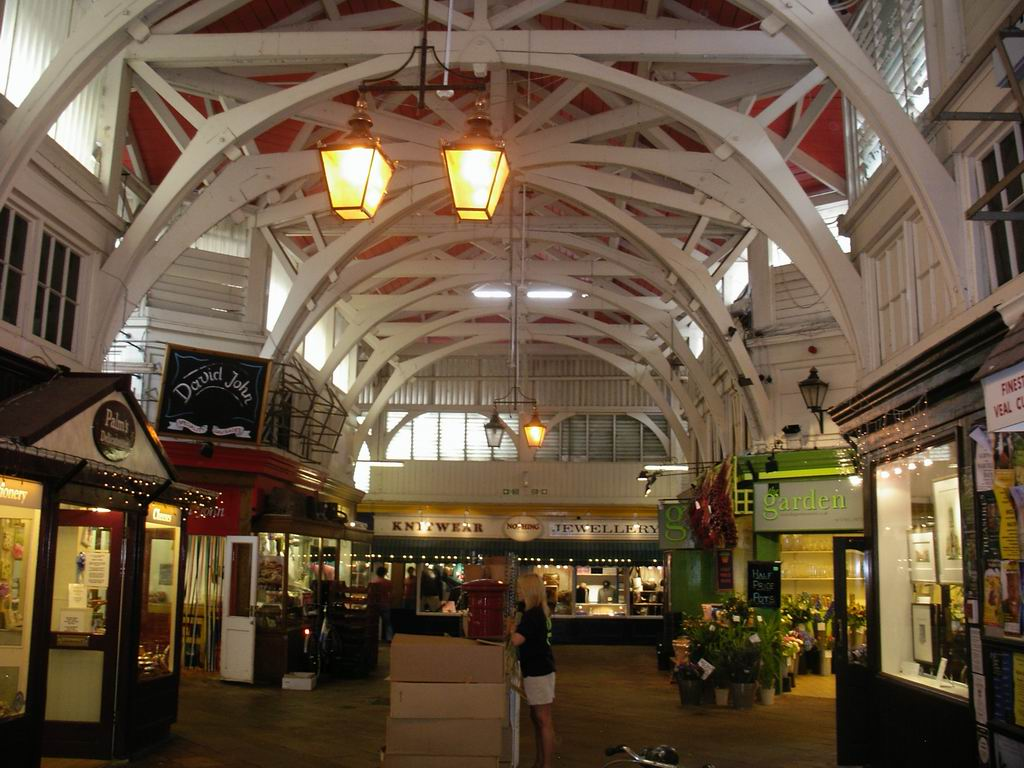
Inside the Covered Market, Oxford, England. Curved roof trusses imitate the form of a stone arcade.

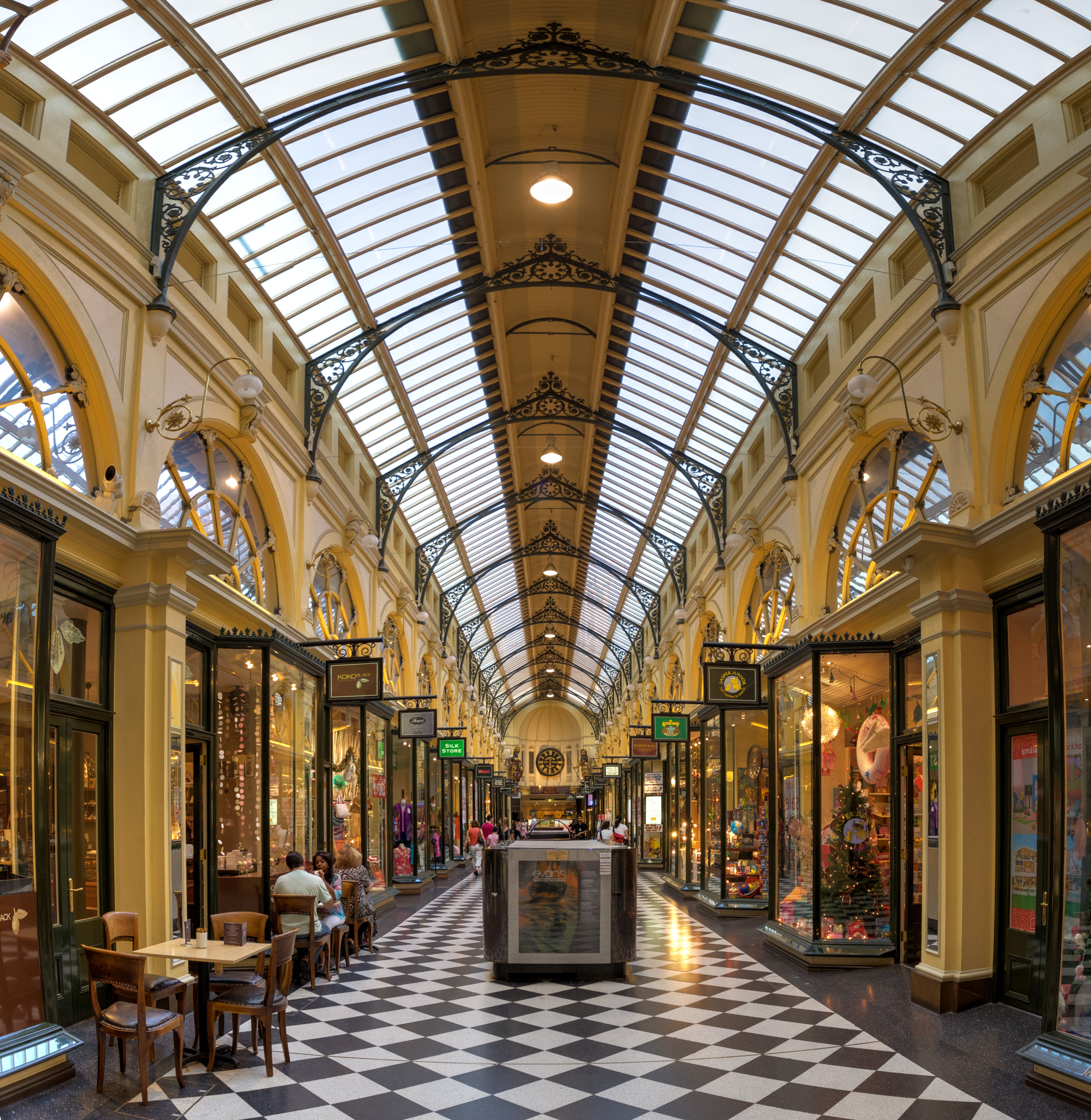
Royal Arcade in Melbourne, Victoria, Australia, opened 1870

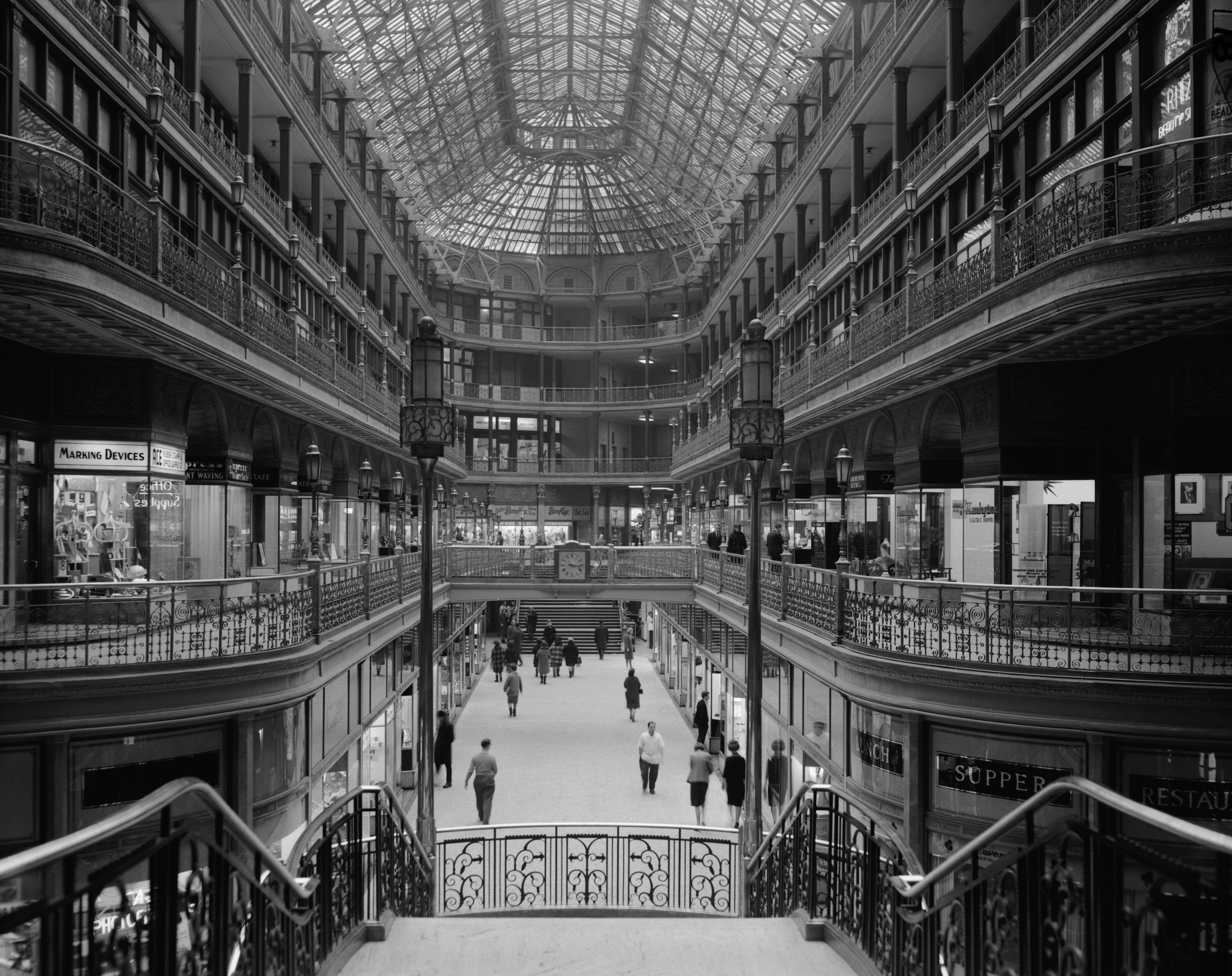
The Cleveland Arcade in downtown Cleveland, Ohio, United States, built 1890

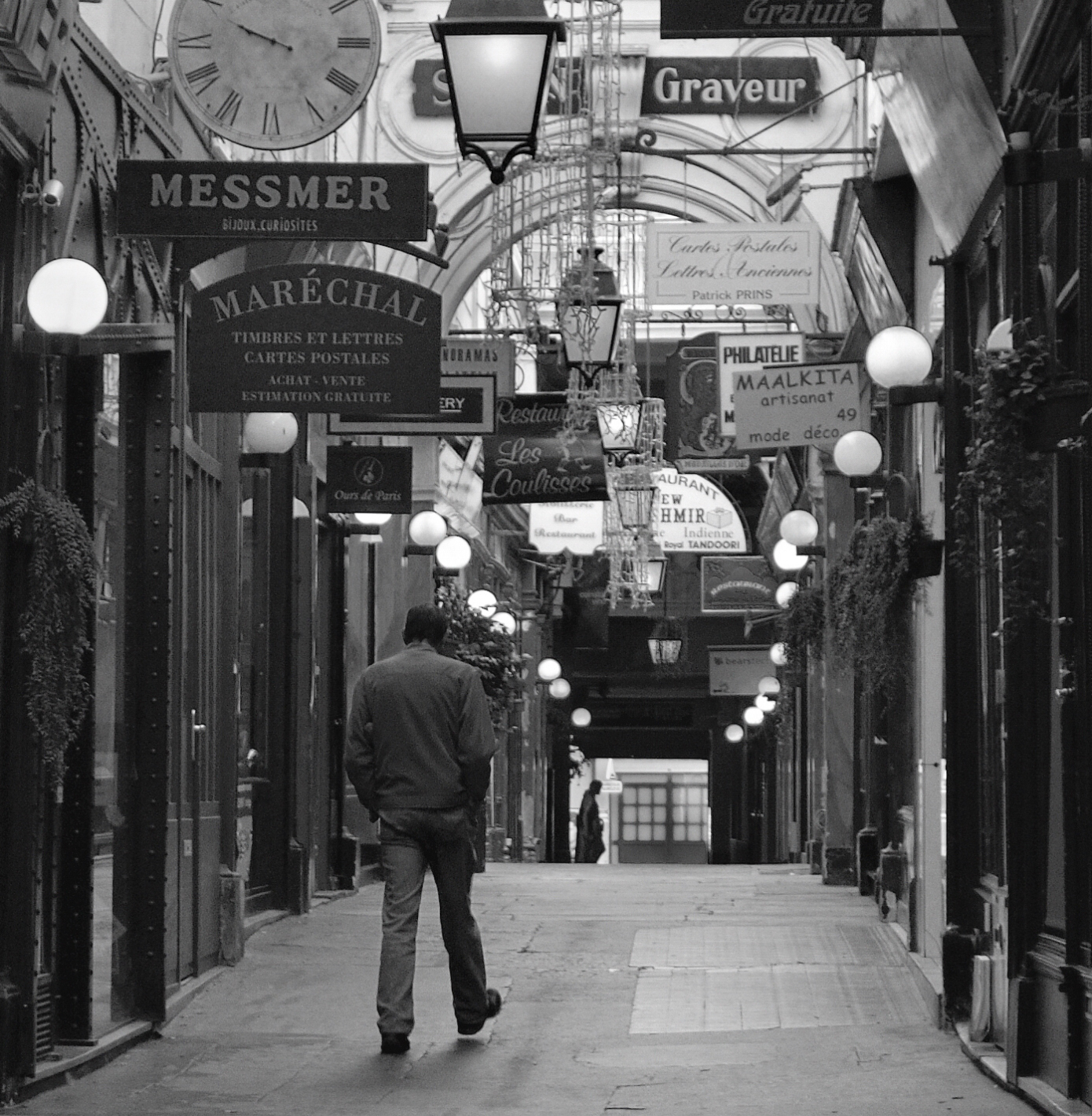
The Passage des Panoramas, Paris, France

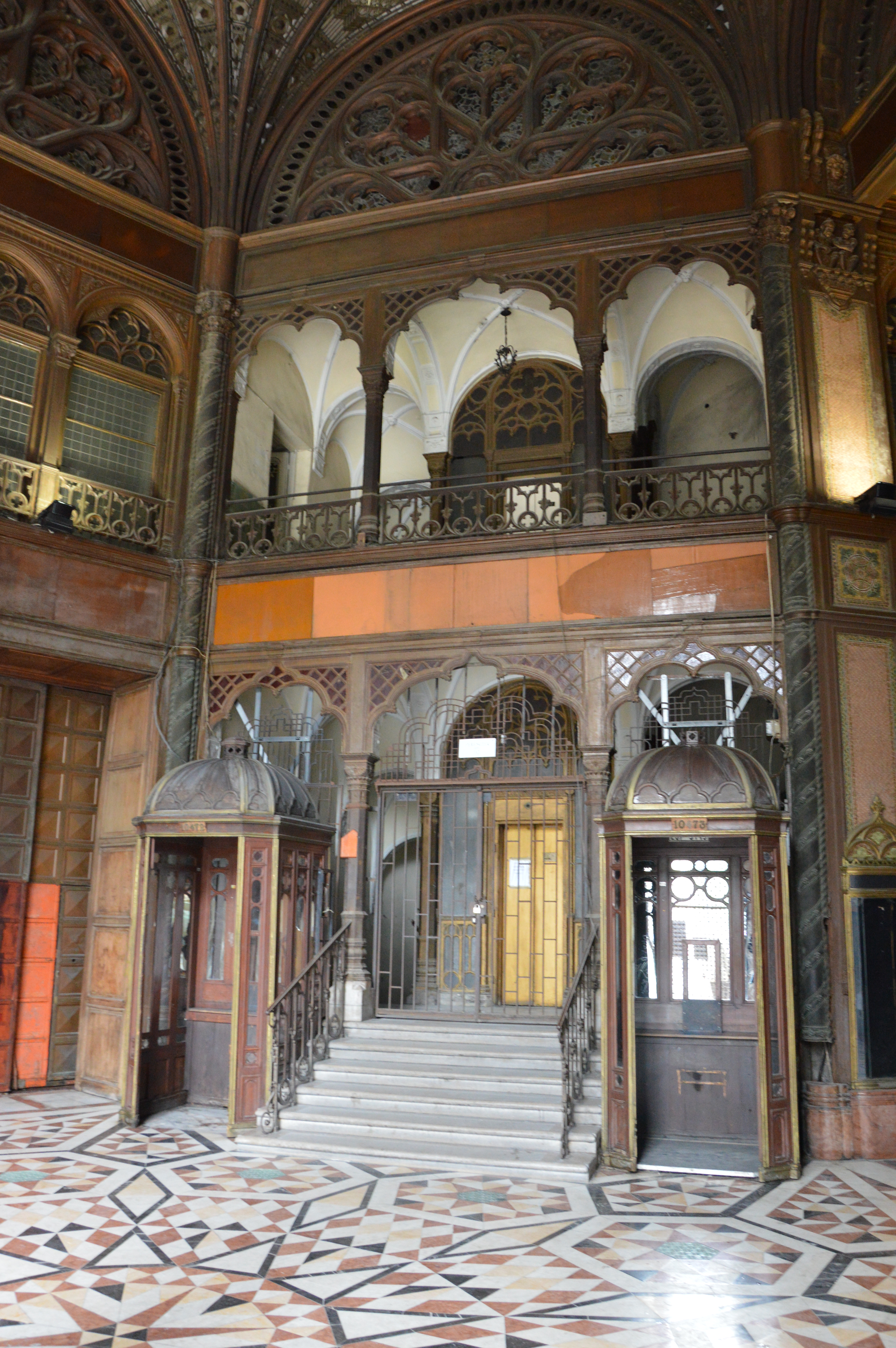
The Párizsi udvar in Budapest

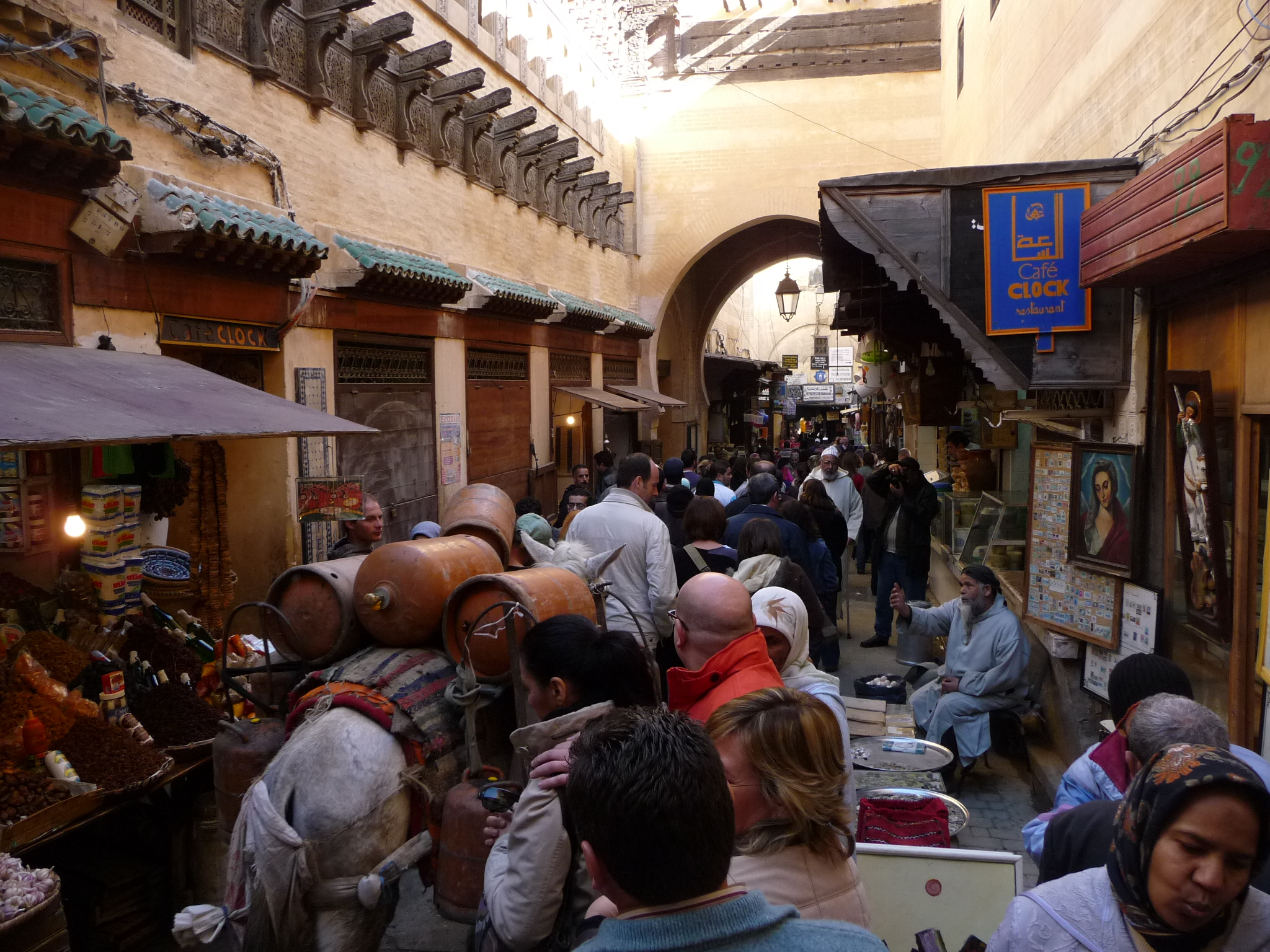
Mule moving goods through the car-free medina in Fez, Morocco

== Notable arcades ==
=== Religious buildings ===
- Great Mosque of Córdoba, Spain
- Mission San Fernando Rey de España - Architecture of the California missions, United States
- Mosque of Uqba, Kairouan, Tunisia
- Real Monasterio de Nuestra Senora de Rueda, Aragon Autonomous Community, Spain
- Rila Monastery, Bulgaria
- Sanctuary of the Madonna di San Luca, Bologna, Italy

=== Shopping "arcades" ===
- Adelaide Arcade, Adelaide, Australia
- Arcade Building, Asheville, North Carolina, United States
- Barton Arcade, Manchester, England
- Block Arcade, Melbourne, Australia
- Bortier Gallery, Brussels, Belgium
- Brisbane Arcade, Brisbane, Australia
- Burlington Arcade, London, England
- Camayo Arcade, Winchester, Ashland, Kentucky, United States
- Cathedral Arcade, Melbourne, Australia
- City Market, Charleston, South Carolina, United States
- Çiçek Pasajı, Istanbul, Turkey
- Cleveland Arcade, Cleveland, Ohio, United States
- The Corridor, Bath, England
- Covered Market, Oxford, England
- Dayton Arcade, Dayton, Ohio, United States
- Eaton Centre, Toronto, Ontario, Canada
- Monticello Arcade, Norfolk, Virginia
- Galerías Pacífico, Buenos Aires, Argentina
- Galleria Vittorio Emanuele II, Milan, Italy
- GPO Arcade, Dublin, Ireland
- Grand Arcade, Leeds, United Kingdom
- Grand Arcade, Wigan, United Kingdom
- Great Western Arcade, Birmingham, England
- GUM, Moscow, Russia
- Galleria Umberto I, Naples, Italy
- Mädler Arcade Gallery, Leipzig, Germany
- Market Arcade, Buffalo, New York, United States
- Monticello Arcade, Norfolk, Virginia, United States
- Nashville Arcade, Nashville, Tennessee, United States
- Northern Gallery, Brussels, Belgium
- Odesa Passage, Odesa, Ukraine
- Old Bank Arcade, Wellington, New Zealand
- Paddock Arcade, Watertown, New York, United States
- Palais-Royal, Paris, France
- Pasaje Hernández, Bogotá, Colombia
- Pasaje Amador, Quito, Ecuador
- The Passage des Panoramas, Paris, France
- The Passage de l'Argue, Lyon, France
- Piccadilly Arcade London, England
- Queens Arcade, Cardiff, Wales, United Kingdom
- Ravenstein Gallery, Brussels, Belgium
- The Royal Arcade, London
- Royal Arcade, Melbourne, Australia
- Royal Saint-Hubert Galleries, Brussels, Belgium
- Rue de Rivoli, Paris, France
- Stanford University, Stanford, California, United States
- Silver Arcade Silver Arcade, Leicester, United Kingdom
- The Strand Arcade and Queen Victoria Building, Sydney New South Wales, Australia
- Great Gostiny Dvor St. Petersburg, Russia
- The Passage St. Petersburg, Russia
- Victoria Quarter, Leeds, England
- Westminster Arcade, Providence, Rhode Island, United States

== Gallery ==
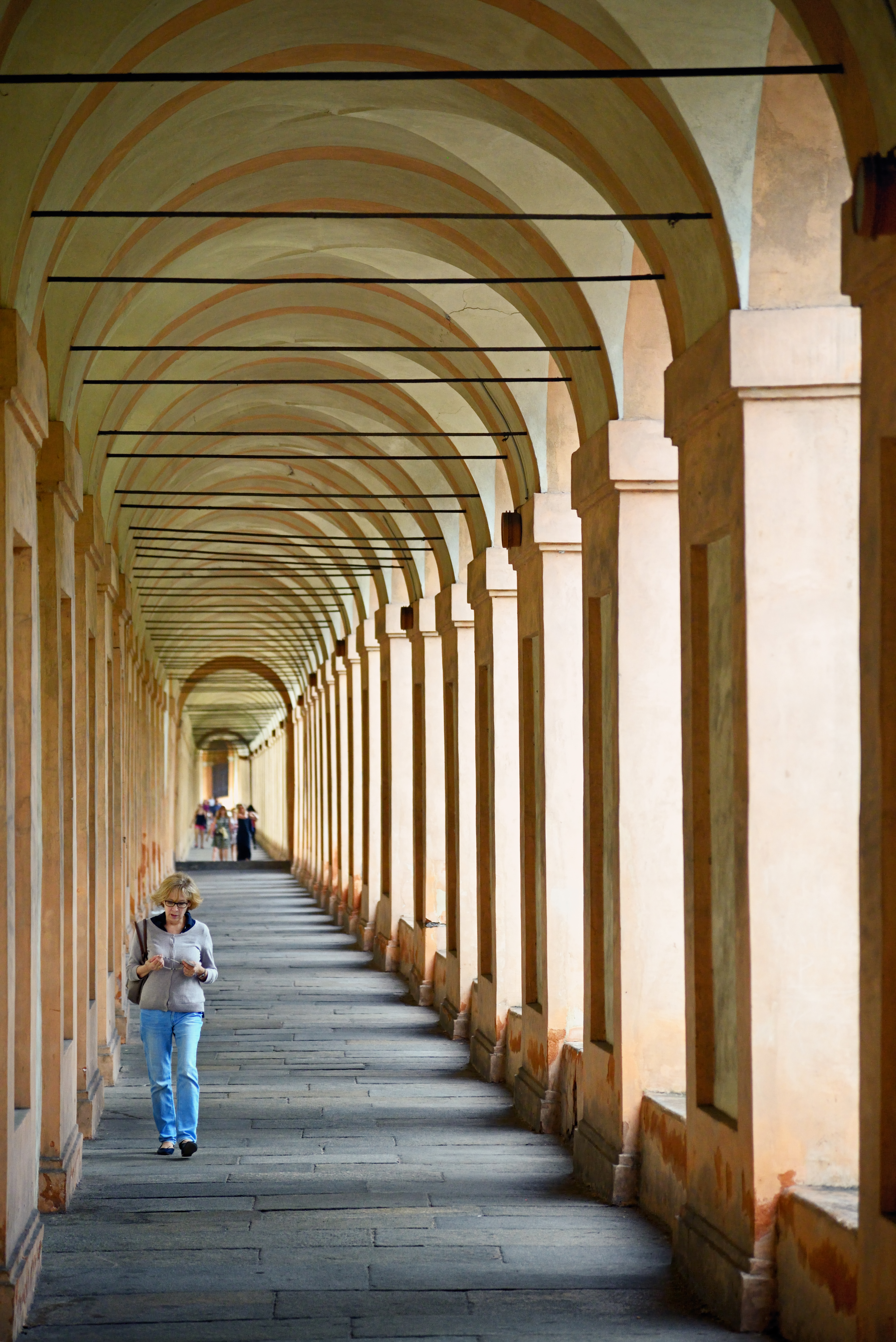
Arcade of Sanctuary of the Madonna di San Luca, Bologna, Italy. 2016

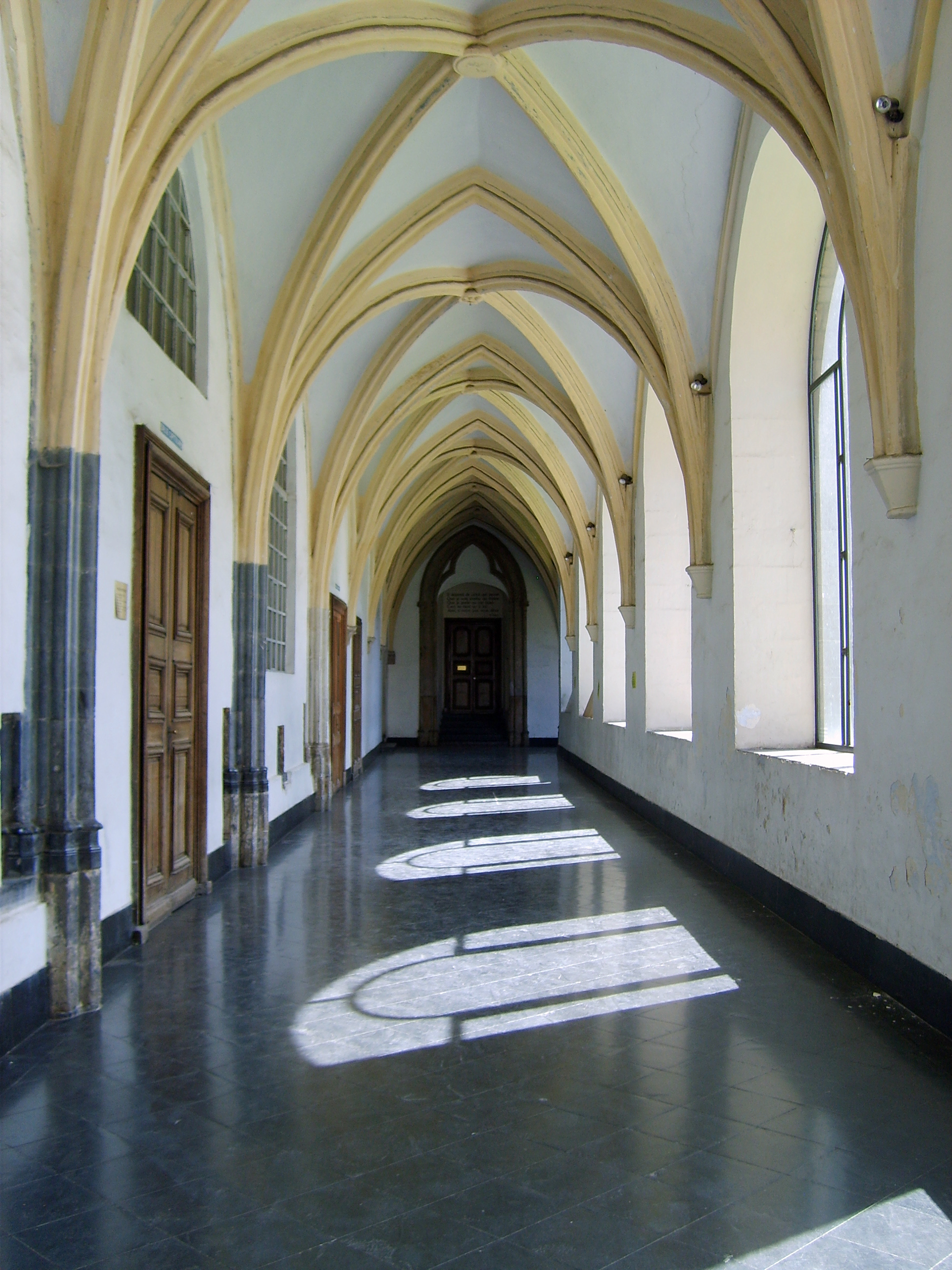
Arcades inside the Bonne-Espérance Abbey.

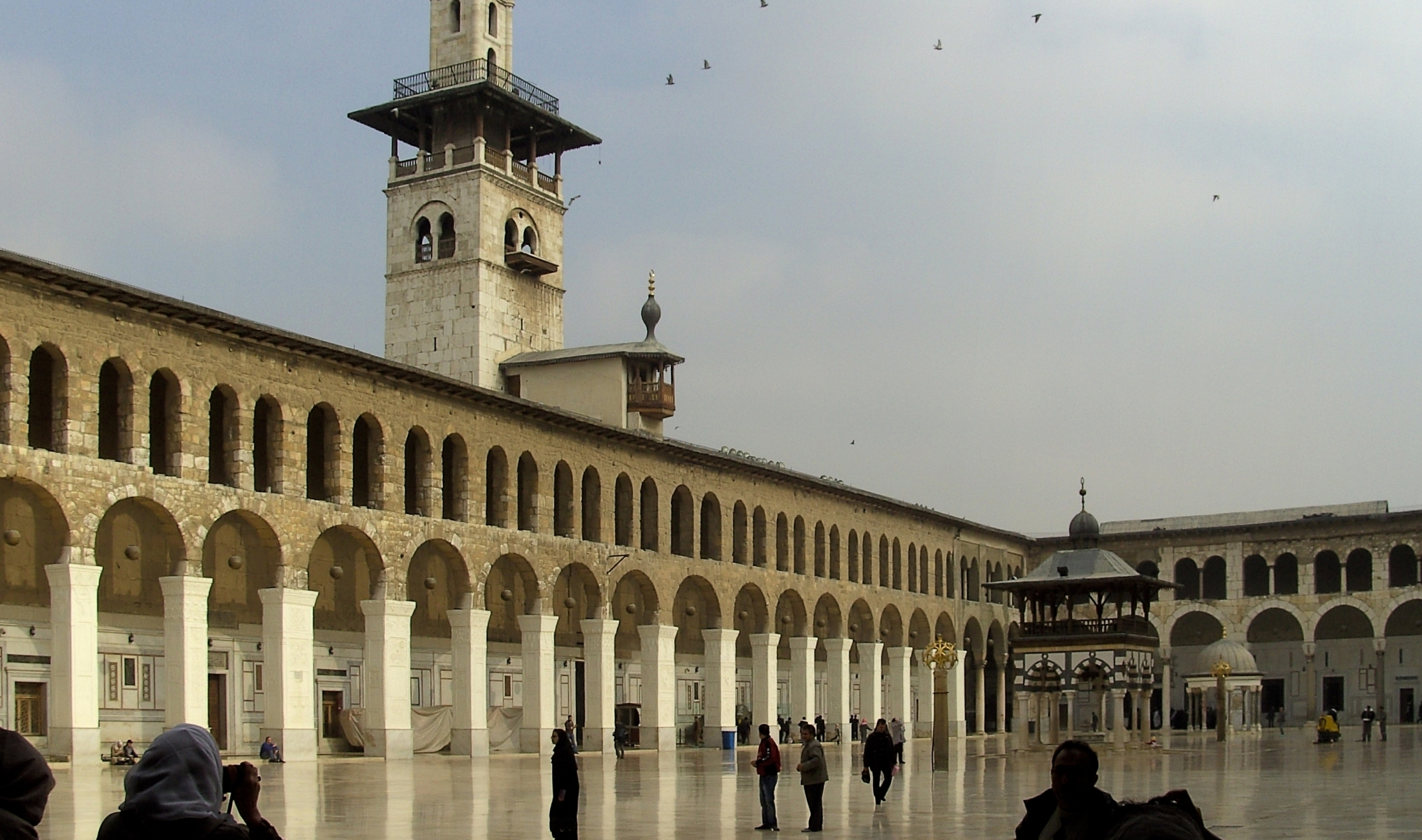
Courtyard of the Great Mosque of Damascus

== See also ==
- Alley
- Aqueduct
- Bazaar
- Cloister
- Five-foot way
- Lanes and arcades of Melbourne, Australia
- List of shopping arcades in Cardiff, Wales, United Kingdom
- List of shopping centres in the United Kingdom
- Loggia
- Marketplace
- Penny arcade
- Retail
- Roman aqueduct
- Shophouse
- Shopping arcade
- Souq
- Stoa
- Tong lau
