= The Grand Hotel Leicester =

Hotel in Leicester, England

Coordinates: 52.6332°N 1.1299°W

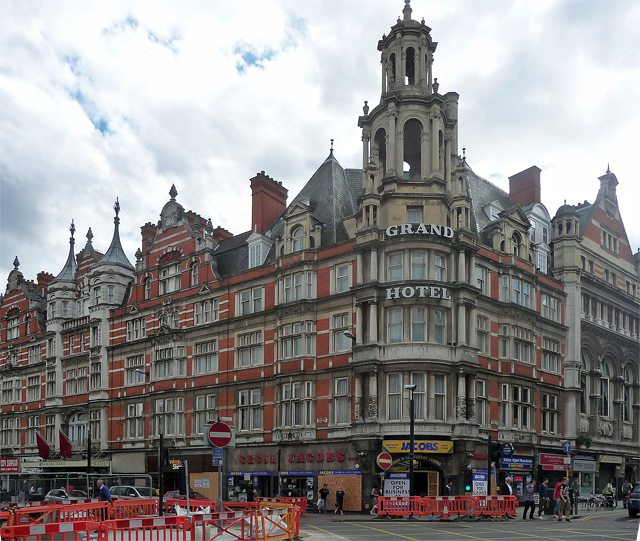
The Grand Hotel

The Grand Hotel Leicester by The Unlimited Collection is a Grade II listed historic hotel on Granby Street in the city centre of Leicester, England.

It was designed by Cecil Ogden and Amos Hall and built between 1897–98 by Orson Wright, a prominent Leicester property developer and industrialist who was also the hotel's original owner. Wright obtained permission in 1897 to build the hotel on the site of the former Carlton Hotel, and a prospectus issued in 1902 recorded that the hotel had been "erected and fully equipped" by him. The wedding-cake style top on the corner of Granby Street and Belvoir Street was added by Amos Hall, who also designed the Silver Arcade in the Edwardian period.

The Kings Hall, with its ornate gilt capped columns and extravagant use of decorative marble, was envisaged by Orson Wright and designed by Amos Hall. Located on the first floor, it could cater for 350 people and was used for banquets, balls, concerts and public meetings. The hall later became a 700 seat cinema, operating as the Kings Hall Cinema from 1915 and subsequently as the Scala Cinema before closing in 1928.

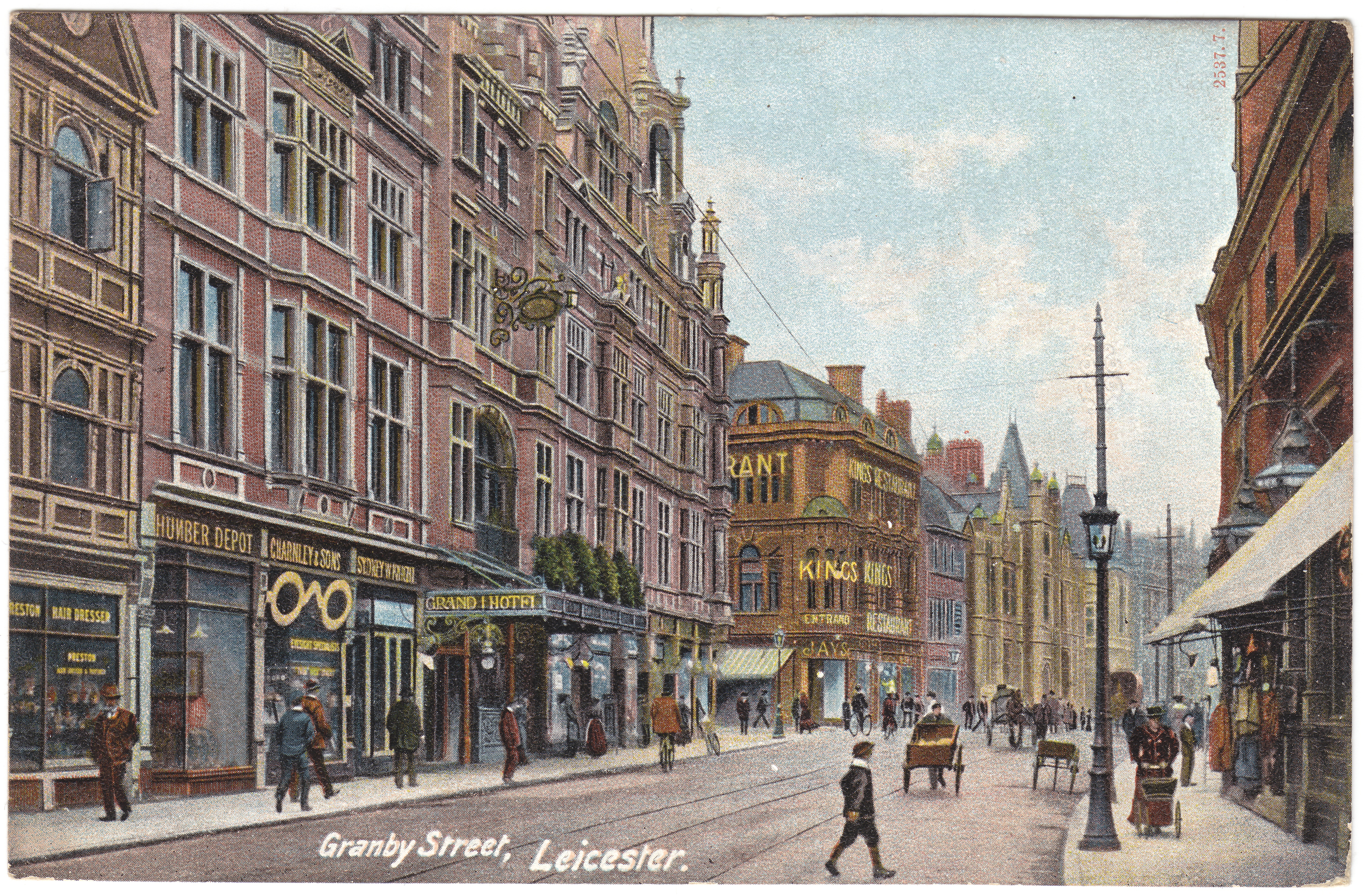
A postcard showing the hotel in 1906

The hotel has always been considered one of Leicester's most prestigious, not long after it opened the hotel was described as "the temporary home of the elite of English Society and generally admitted to be the finest hotel not only in Leicester, but in the Midlands." In 1902 the newly formed Grand Hotel (Leicester) Limited agreed to acquire the hotel, its business and associated assets from Wright for £150,000. Wright remained director of the company and received part of the purchase consideration in ordinary shares.

Over the following decades, the hotel has undergone a number of changes in ownership and name. The Grand Hotel was designated Grade II listed building on the 14th of March 1975. The hotel is in an area designated as a Heritage Action Zone, allowing the securing of a grant from Historic England in 2022 to return the hotel entrance and frontage shops to their original Victorian appearance.

After a complete renovation and upgrade, the hotel reopened on the 1st of February 2026 under The Unlimited Collection by The Ascott Limited brand.
