= Silver Arcade =

Building in Leicester, England

Coordinates: 52.6355°N 1.1341°W

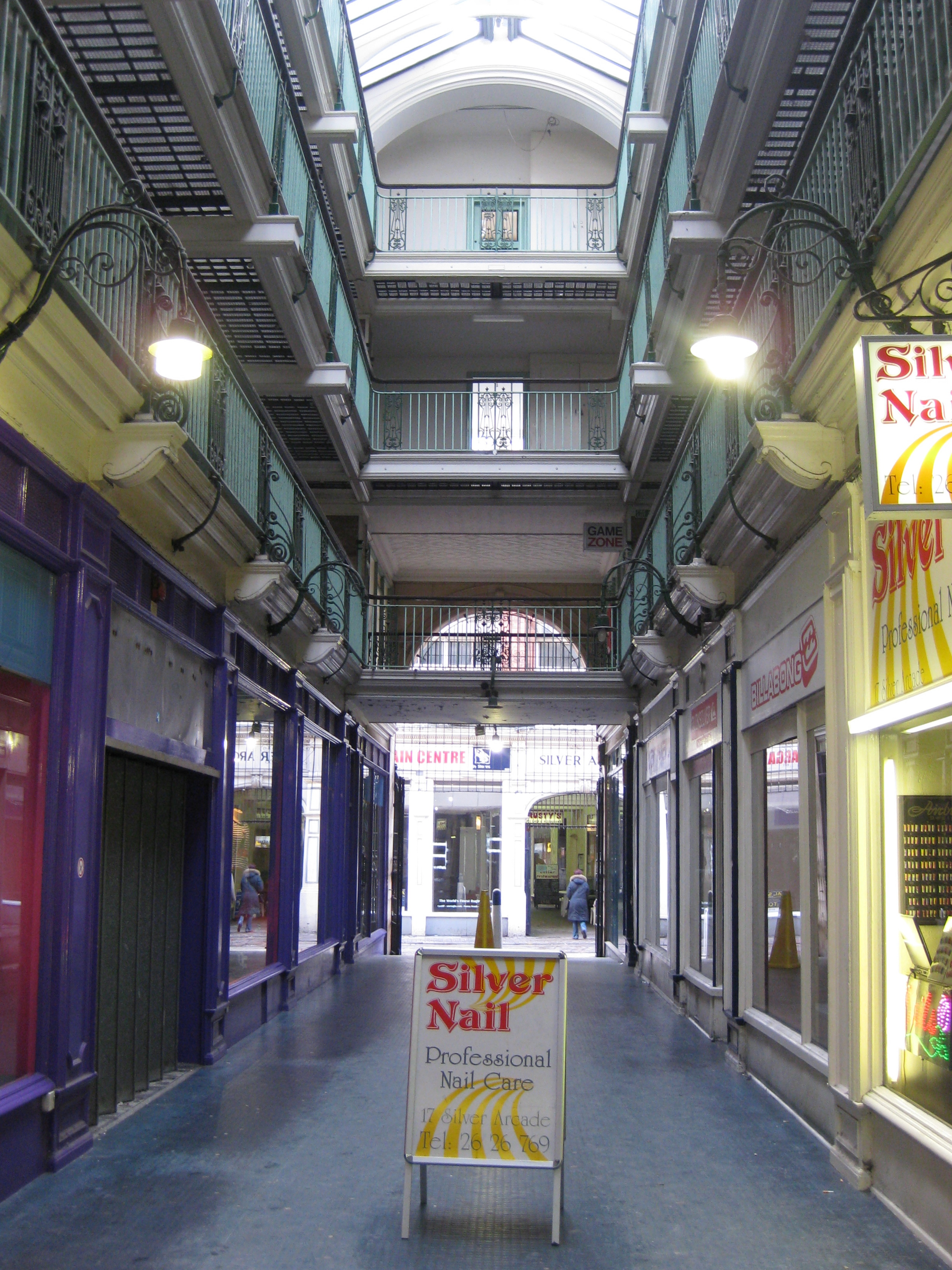
Interior of the Silver Arcade

Silver Arcade is a Grade II listed building in the centre of Leicester, England. A former shopping arcade, Silver Arcade was built by Amos Hall in 1889. The top floor was closed off in 2000, leaving the units on the ground floor occupied by a number of independent retailers. In 2008, the centre was the focus of a campaign by the Leicester Civic Society to reopen it.

In 2010, plans were announced to reopen the top floors. Later plans in 2019 were announced to convert two floors of the building into office space. Following a £3 million refurbishment project, as of 2025 businesses are now open on both ground and some upper floors.
