= Odesa Passage =

Building and hotel in Odesa, Ukraine

- Пасаж
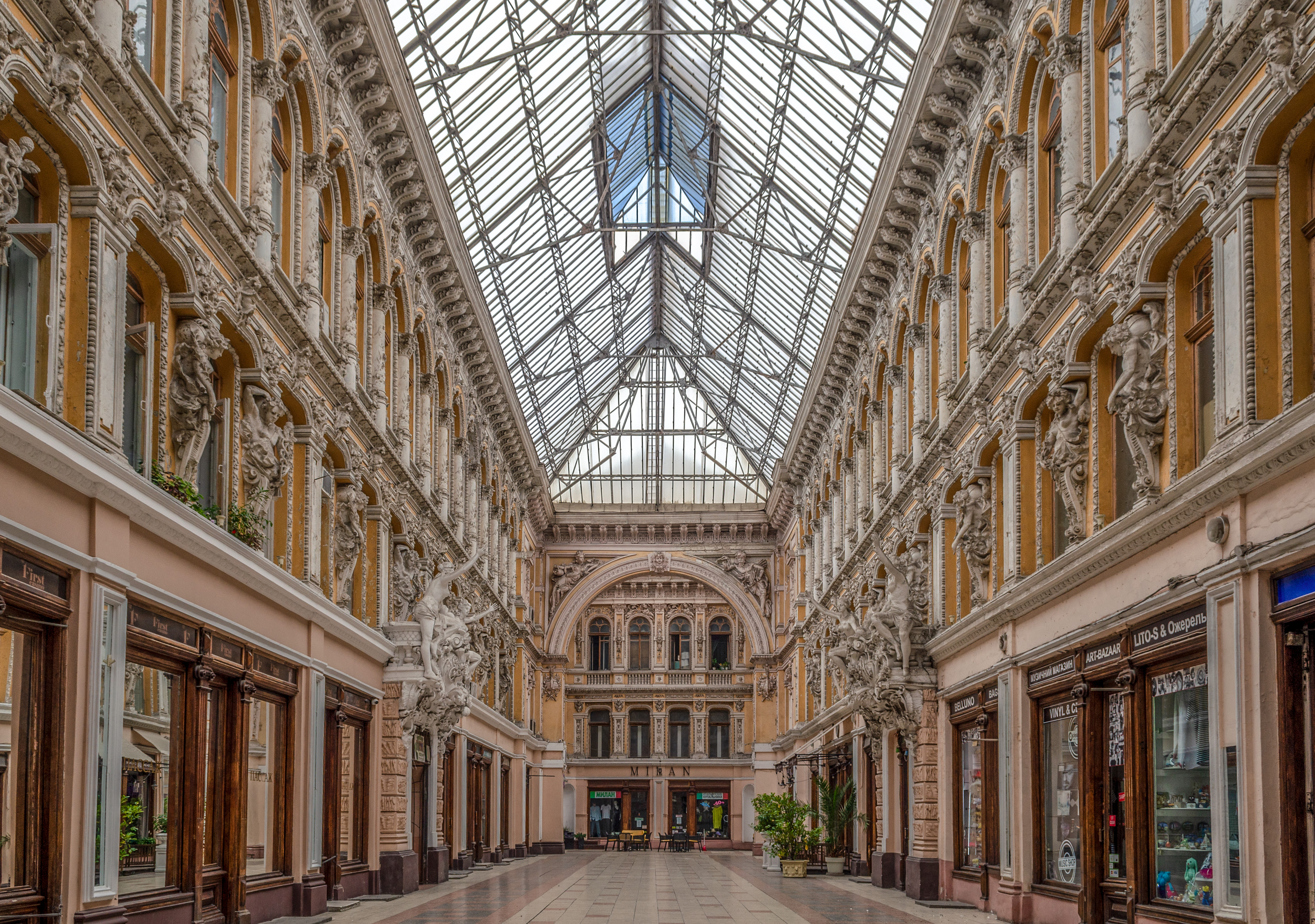
- Shopping arcade with decorative sculptures
- Interactive map of the Odesa Passage area

General information
- Location: Preobrazhenska Street, 34 / Derybasivska Street, 33, Odesa, Ukraine
- Coordinates: 46°29′02.1″N 30°43′59.39″E

Immovable Monument of Local Significance of Ukraine
- Official name: Пасаж та готель “Пасаж” (арх. Л.Л.Влодек; ск..Л.Фішель, С.І.Мільман), де у 1921–1923 рр. містився штаб 51-ї Перекопської дивізії, якою командували В. К. Блюхер і П. Є. Дибенко (Passage and Hotel Passage (arch. L. L. Władek, L. Fishel, S. I. Milman), where in 1921–1923 the headquarters of the 51st Perekop Division, commanded by V. K. Blucher and P. E. Dybenko, was located)
- Type: Architecture, Urban Planning, History
- Reference no.: 23-Од

Odesa Passage (Ukrainian: Пасаж, romanized: Pasazh) is a shopping arcade and a hotel on Derybasivska Street in the centre of Odesa. It has 4 floors. On the ground floor there are many boutiques and on other 3 floors there is a hotel. Odesa Passage was built at the end of the 19th century and was the best hotel in Southern Russian Empire until the Bristol Hotel was opened.

The inside and exterior of the Passage building are decorated by numerous sculptures. The Passage houses multiple shops, restaurants, offices and the economy hotel “Passage”. Passage is the most picturesque market of Odesa.

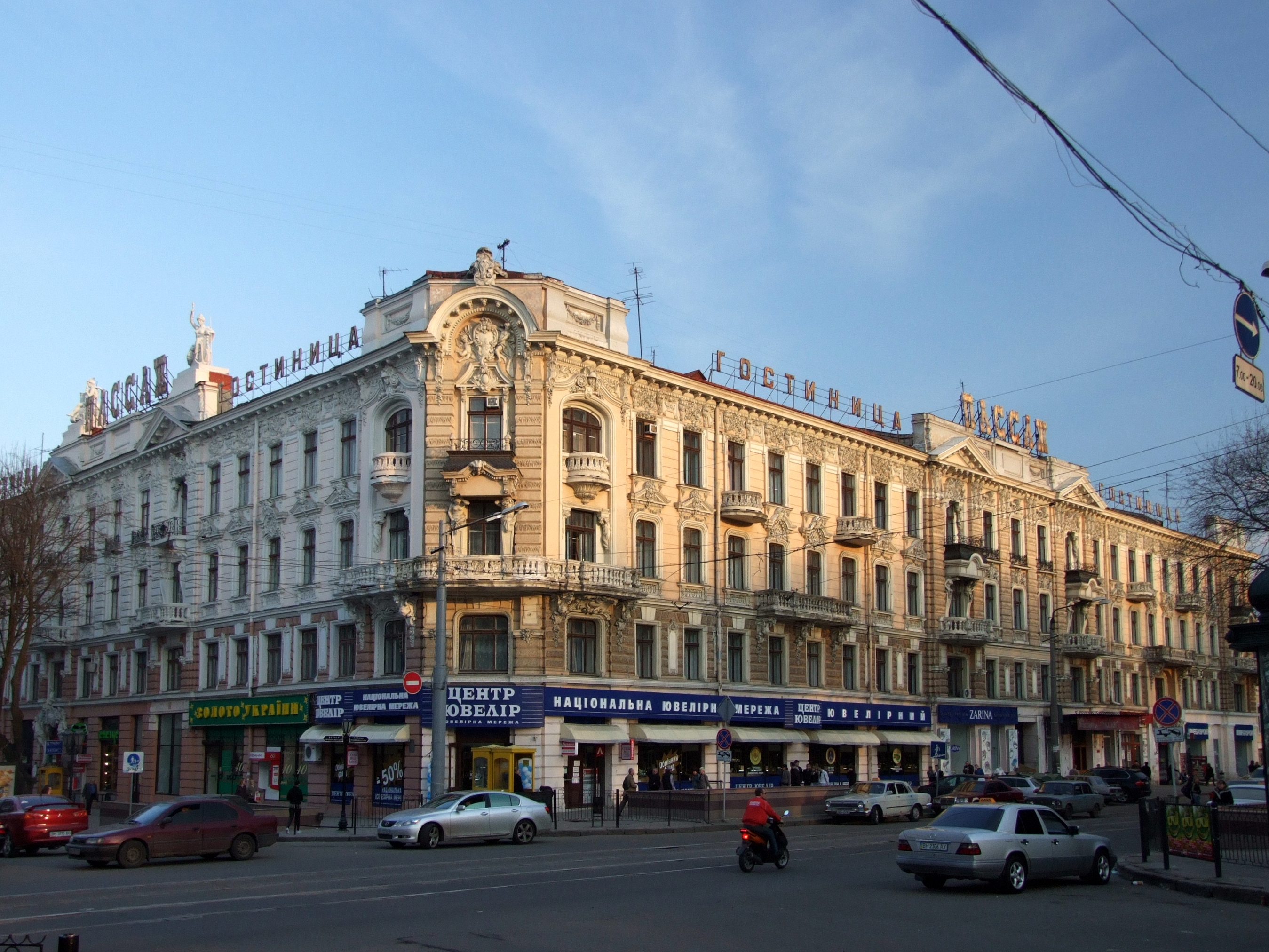
Facade

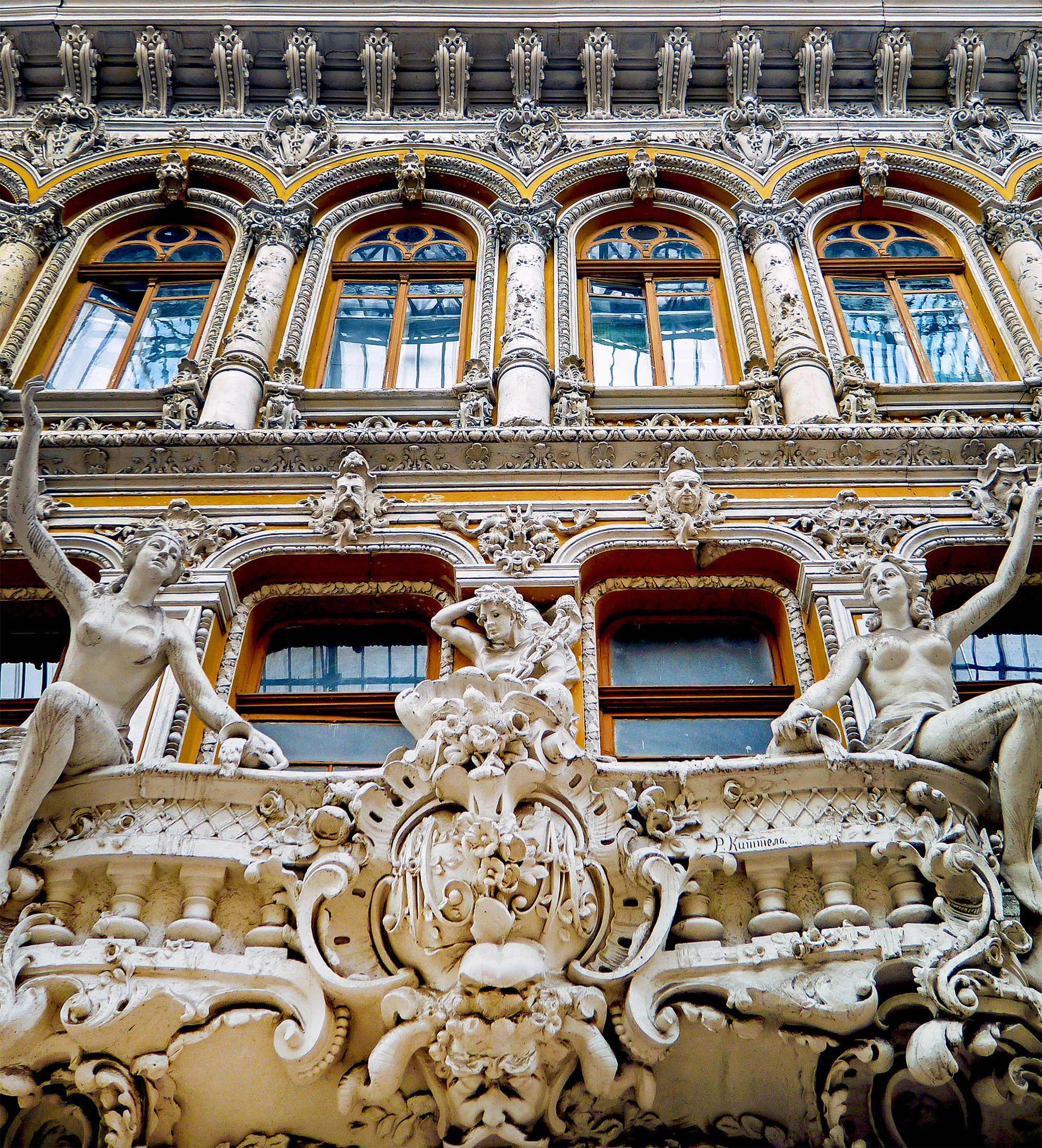
facade detail

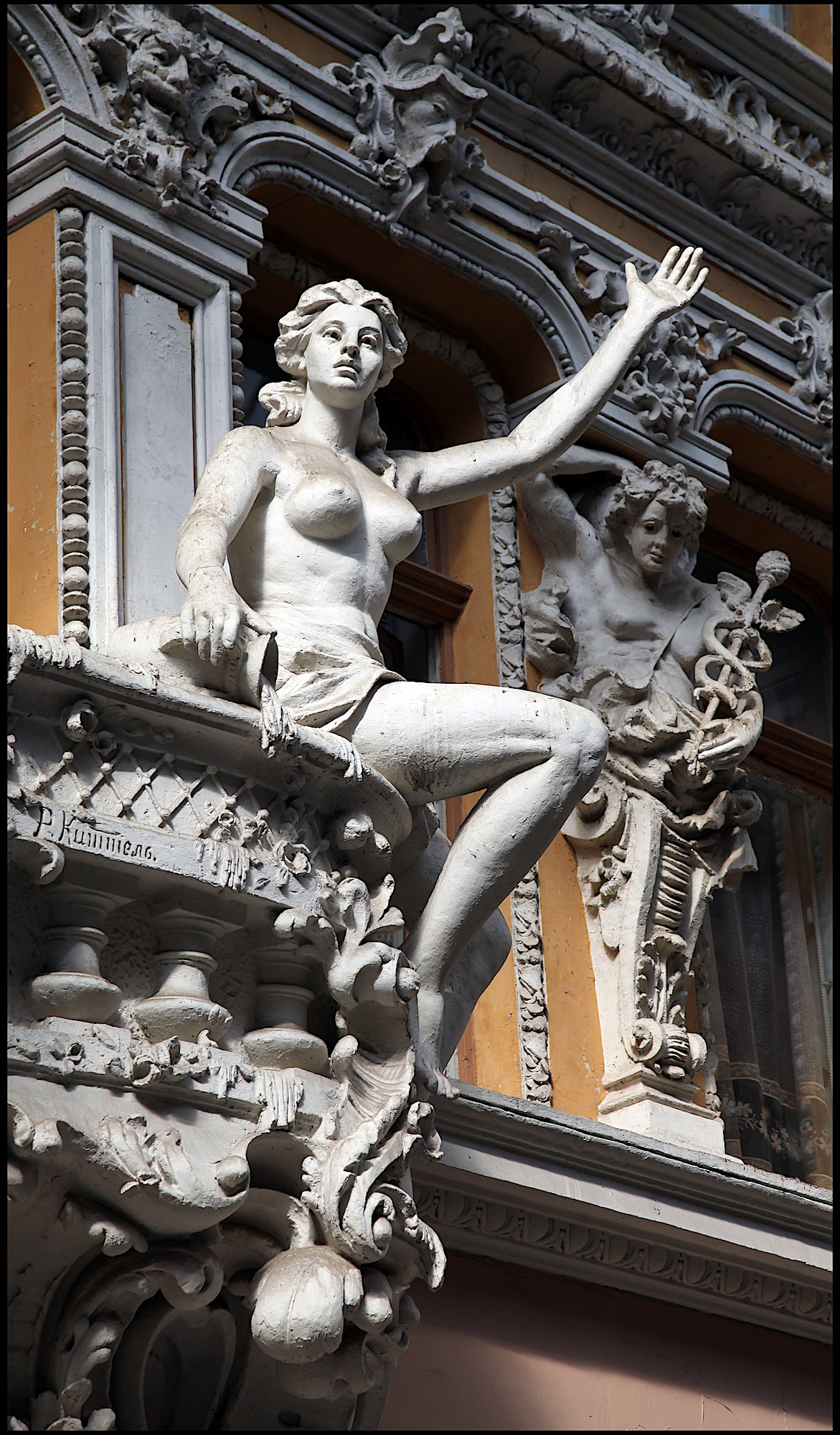
sculpture

== Sources ==
- https://web.archive.org/web/20090706051032/http://www.passage.odessa.ua/index.html
