= List of Sites of Special Scientific Interest in Leicestershire =

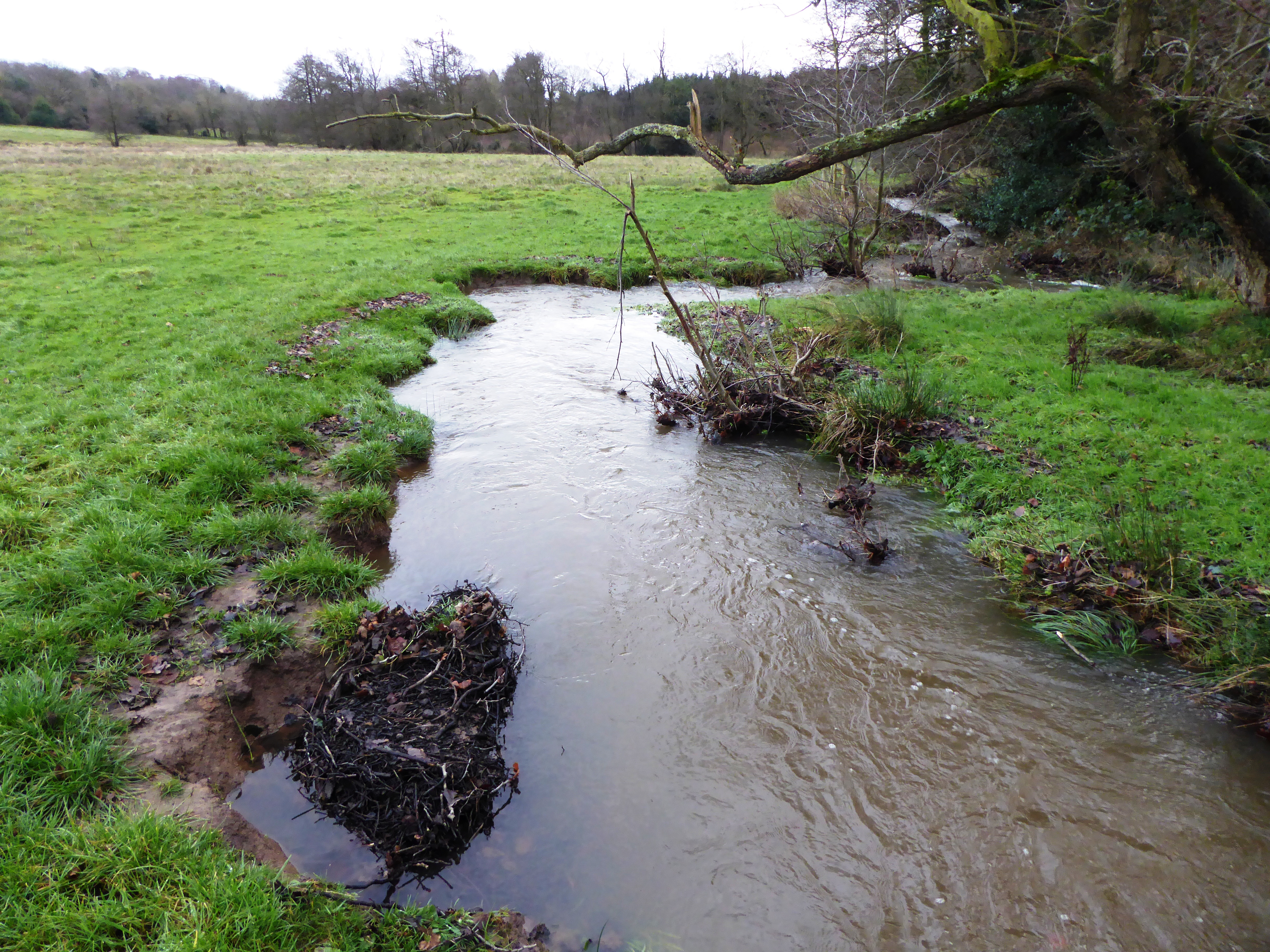
The stream running through Lea Meadows has white-clawed crayfish and brook lampreys, both of which are legally protected. It is part of Ulverscroft Valley.

Leicestershire is a county in the East Midlands of England with an area of 833 square miles (2,160 km^{2}), and a population according to the 2011 census of 980,000. Leicester City Council is a unitary authority, and the rest of the county is administered by Leicestershire County Council at the top level, with seven district councils in the second tier, Blaby, Charnwood, Harborough, Hinckley and Bosworth, Melton, North West Leicestershire and Oadby and Wigston.

In England, Sites of Special Scientific Interest (SSSIs) are designated by Natural England, a non-departmental public body which is responsible for protecting England's natural environment. Designation as an SSSI gives legal protection to the most important wildlife and geological sites. As of January 2018, there are seventy-six SSSIs in the county, fifty-seven of which are designated for their biology, twelve for their geology and seven for both criteria.

There are nineteen Geological Conservation Review sites, six Nature Conservation Review sites, one Special Area of Conservation, three national nature reserves, two are common land, and three contain scheduled monuments. One site is a local nature reserve, thirteen are managed by the Leicestershire and Rutland Wildlife Trust, and one by the National Trust. The largest site is Bradgate Park and Cropston Reservoir at 399.3 hectares (987 acres). It has rocks dating to the Ediacaran period around 600 million years ago, and is very important for the study of Precambrian palaeontology. The smallest is Gipsy Lane Pit at 0.5 hectares (1.2 acres), which is important to mineralogists as it is rich in sulphides, some of which are unidentified.

== Key ==
=== Interest ===
- B = a site of biological interest
- G = a site of geological interest

=== Public access ===
- FP = access to footpaths through the site only
- NO = no public access to site
- PP = public access to part of site
- WTPR = Leicestershire and Rutland Wildlife Trust permit required for access
- YES = public access to the whole or most of the site

=== Other classifications ===
- CL = Common land
- GCR = Geological Conservation Review
- LNR = Local nature reserve
- LRWT = Leicestershire and Rutland Wildlife Trust
- NCR = Nature Conservation Review
- NNR = National nature reserve
- NT = National Trust
- SAC = Special Area of Conservation
- SM = Scheduled monument

== Sites ==
| Site name | Photograph | B | G | Area (Note: The area and grid reference are taken from the "Details" page for each site on the Natural England database.) | Public access | Location | Other classifications | Map (Note: The maps are provided by Natural England on the Magic Map website.) | Citation (Note: Citations are provided for each site by Natural England.) | Description (Note: Descriptions are mainly based on the official Natural England citations. Many of these date to the 1980s, and in some cases may be out of date.) |
|---|---|---|---|---|---|---|---|---|---|---|
| Allexton Wood | Allexton Wood | ✓ | | 25.8 hectares (64 acres) | NO | Uppingham; 52.586°N 0.788°W; SP822994 | | Map | Citation | This coppice semi-natural wood is on soils derived from glacial and Jurassic clays. The dominant tree is ash, and elm and pedunculate oak are also common. There are several small streams with populations of opposite-leaved golden saxifrage. |
| Ashby Canal | Ashby Canal | ✓ | | 15.4 hectares (38 acres) | YES | Leicester; 52.662°N 1.463°W; SK364073 | | Map | Citation | The site has diverse aquatic flora and invertebrates, and the submerged plants are of particular interest. These include mare's tail, spiked water-milfoil and perfoliate pondweed. Nine species of dragonfly have been recorded, and there are also water shrews and the nationally rare water beetle haliplus mucronatus. |
| Bardon Hill | Bardon Hill | ✓ | | 13 hectares (32 acres) | YES | Coalville; 52.712°N 1.32°W; SK460130 | | Map | Citation | The hill is a surviving fragment of the formerly extensive Charnwood Forest, and it has both woodland and heath. Mature oak dominates the lower slopes, with pine plantation higher up, and a mixture of heath, acid grassland, rock outcrops and scrub oak at the top. The hill is notable for its lichens and invertebrates, especially spiders with 133 species including the rare Tetrilus macrophthalmus. |
| Bardon Hill Quarry | Bardon Hill Quarry | | ✓ | 58.1 hectares (144 acres) | NO | Coalville; 52.711°N 1.329°W; SK454129 | GCR | Map | Citation | This quarry has been operated for over 400 years and produces three million tonnes of crushed rock a year, about 15% of the total production in the United Kingdom. It exposes rocks from an andesitic Precambrian volcano, about 570 million years old, similar to lava of the 1995 Montserrat eruption. There are veins of quartz containing copper and gold. |
| Barrow Gravel Pits | Barrow Gravel Pits | ✓ | | 35.7 hectares (88 acres) | YES | Loughborough; 52.744°N 1.158°W; SK569166 | | Map | Citation | This site in the flood plain of the River Soar has open water in the former gravel pits, marshes, hay meadows, woodland and scrub. Aquatic plants include yellow water lily, rigid hornwort, lesser pondweed and fan-leaved water crowfoot. |
| Beacon Hill, Hangingstone and Outwoods | Beacon Hill | ✓ | ✓ | 147.4 hectares (364 acres) | PP | Loughborough; 52.741°N 1.24°W; SK514163 | GCR, NCR | Map | Citation | Beacon Hill has diverse breeding birds, such as green woodpeckers, tawny owls and tree pipits, and it is one of only three sites in the county with breeding palmate newts. The Outwoods and Hangingstone are of international importance for their fossils of early Precambrian life forms. |
| Benscliffe Wood | Benscliffe Wood | ✓ | | 9.8 hectares (24 acres) | NO | Leicester; 52.709°N 1.242°W; SK513127 | | Map | Citation | This wood has one of the richest varieties of lichens in the East Midlands, with over thirty species growing on Precambrian rocks. Eleven of the species are rare in the county. |
| Blackbrook Reservoir | Blackbrook Reservoir | ✓ | | 39.3 hectares (97 acres) | FP | Shepshed; 52.751°N 1.322°W; SK458173 | | Map | Citation | The reservoir has a plant community on its margins which is unique in the Midlands and only found in a few northern sites. Its unusual mix of flora includes Juncus filiformis at its most southern locations, and the lake itself has native white-clawed crayfish, where it is isolated from the invasive American signal crayfish. |
| Botcheston Bog | Botcheston Bog | ✓ | | 2.8 hectares (6.9 acres) | NO | Leicester; 52.637°N 1.284°W; SK485047 | | Map | Citation | This grazed marsh on peaty soil is dominated by carnation sedge, hard rush, creeping bent and meadowsweet. Other plants include several which are rare in the county. |
| Bradgate Park and Cropston Reservoir | Cropston Reservoir | ✓ | ✓ | 399.3 hectares (987 acres) | YES | Leicester; 52.689°N 1.217°W; SK530105 | GCR, SM | Map | Citation | Bradgate Park has one of the best examples of ancient parkland in the county, and Cropston Reservoir has unusual plants on its shores. The park has Charnian rocks dating to the Ediacaran period around 600 million years ago, and it has provided the type section for four different members of the stratigraphic sequence. It is described by Natural England as "a site of great importance to the study of Precambrian palaeontology". |
| Breedon Cloud Wood and Quarry | Breedon Quarry | ✓ | ✓ | 63.2 hectares (156 acres) | PP | Loughborough; 52.786°N 1.387°W; SK414212 | GCR, LRWT | Map | Citation | Cloud Wood is an ancient semi-natural wood on clay. It has a very diverse ground flora, including pendulous sedge, yellow archangel and giant bellflower. The quarry is a nationally important geological locality, exposing a Lower Carboniferous succession deposited in shallow seas. |
| Breedon Hill | Breedon Hill | ✓ | | 5.2 hectares (13 acres) | YES | Loughborough; 52.804°N 1.402°W; SK404232 | | Map | Citation | This is the largest area of species rich carboniferous limestone in the county. Herbs include bulbous buttercup, harebell, burnet saxifrage, musk thistle and hairy violet. |
| Briery Wood Heronry, Belvoir | Briery Wood Heronry | ✓ | | 5.7 hectares (14 acres) | NO | Grantham; 52.887°N 0.775°W; SK825329 | | Map | Citation | This is the largest heronry in the county, with up to thirty breeding pairs. The dominant trees are mature oaks and ash, with a ground flora of bracken and dog's mercury. |
| Buddon Wood and Swithland Reservoir | Swithland Reservoir | ✓ | ✓ | 187.1 hectares (462 acres) | NO | Leicester; 52.727°N 1.17°W; SK561147 | GCR | Map | Citation | The reservoir provides a refuge for waterfowl during the winter, and Buddon Wood has over 200 species of vascular plants, a third of British spider species including one which is nationally rare, 20 butterflies and 200 moths. Buddon Hill quarry is geologically important, and it is disputed whether an area of andesite dates to the Cambrian or the earlier Ediacaran. |
| Burbage Wood and Aston Firs | Burbage Wood and Aston Firs | ✓ | | 51.1 hectares (126 acres) | PP | Hinckley; 52.541°N 1.334°W; SP452940 | LNR | Map | Citation | These semi-natural woods on poorly drained soils are dominated by ash and oak. Hazel and hawthorn are common in the shrub layer, and there are flowers such as sweet woodruff and water avens. |
| Cave's Inn Pits | Cave's Inn Pits | ✓ | | 5.8 hectares (14 acres) | NO | Lutterworth; 52.41°N 1.21°W; SP538795 | | Map | Citation | These disused gravel workings have some of the best neutral marsh in the county, with varied habitats also including scrub, species-rich grassland and shallow pools. There are diverse species of breeding birds. |
| Charnwood Lodge | Charnwood Lodge | ✓ | ✓ | 134.2 hectares (332 acres) | PP | Coalville; 52.733°N 1.312°W; SK465153 | GCR, LRWT, NNR | Map | Citation | This is the largest area of moorland in the East Midlands, and it is mainly covered by bracken on dry hills, while wet heath is dominated by purple moor-grass. The site is geologically important for the 'bomb' rocks, volcanic blocks dating from the Ediacaran period around 600 million years ago. |
| Chater Valley | Chater Valley | ✓ | | 3.8 hectares (9.4 acres) | NO | Uppingham; 52.632°N 0.816°W; SK802045 | | Map | Citation | This steeply sloping stretch of the valley of the River Chater is a semi-natural mosaic of grassland and spring-fed marsh. There are diverse breeding birds, invertebrates and herbs, including tormentil, betony and one of the few populations in the county of moonwort. |
| Cliffe Hill Quarry | Cliffe Hill Quarry | | ✓ | 19.2 hectares (47 acres) | NO | Coalville; 52.691°N 1.3°W; SK474107 | GCR | Map | Citation | This quarry on the western outskirts of Markfield exposes volcanic and sedimentary Charnian rocks dating to the Precambrian eon. It was probably then a volcanic island. The rare mineral diorite is sometimes called markfieldite because it is found in the village. |
| Coalville Meadows | Coalville Meadows | ✓ | | 6 hectares (15 acres) | YES | Coalville; 52.73°N 1.34°W; SK446150 | | Map | Citation | These meadows on poorly drained clay soils are dominated by great burnet, red fescue, Yorkshire fog and tufted hair-grass. Herbs include pignut and heath bedstraw. |
| Cotes Grassland | Cotes Grassland | ✓ | | 3.2 hectares (7.9 acres) | YES | Loughborough; 52.781°N 1.181°W; SK553208 | | Map | Citation | This meadow on the bank of the River Soar has a thin soil on alluvial river gravels. It has several plants which are uncommon in the Midlands, such as soft trefoil, spotted medick, knotted hedge-parsley, wild clary and subterranean trefoil. |
| Cribb's Lodge Meadows | Cribb's Meadow | ✓ | | 4.1 hectares (10 acres) | YES | Melton Mowbray; 52.759°N 0.669°W; SK899188 | LRWT, NCR, NNR | Map | Citation | The embankment of a disused railway runs through this ridge and furrow neutral meadow on boulder clay. The diverse flora includes adder's tongue fern, pepper saxifrage, hayrattle and green-winged orchid. |
| Croft and Huncote Quarry | Croft Quarry | | ✓ | 35.2 hectares (87 acres) | NO | Hinckley; 52.563°N 1.247°W; SP511965 | GCR | Map | Citation | This site exposes igneous tonalite rocks 452 million years old, in the Ordovician period, and it helps to document the growth of continental crust beneath central England. This layer is unconformably overlain by Triassic mineralised manganese. |
| Croft Hill | Croft Hill | ✓ | | 2.0 hectares (4.9 acres) | YES | Hinckley; 52.564°N 1.25°W; SP509966 | | Map | Citation | This site has short, tussocky grass in an open habitat, a nationally rare vegetation type. The granitic soil is thin and short of nutrients. The nationally scarce upright chickweed is abundant in some areas. |
| Croft Pasture | Croft Pasture | ✓ | | 6.1 hectares (15 acres) | YES | Hinckley; 52.557°N 1.25°W; SP509958 | LRWT | Map | Citation | The River Soar runs through this unimproved grazed meadow, which is dominated by common bent and crested dog's-tail. A knoll in the north of the site has uncommon flora such as meadow saxifrage, common stork's-bill and subterranean clover. |
| Croxton Park | Croxton Park | ✓ | | 97.3 hectares (240 acres) | PP | Melton Mowbray; 52.84°N 0.785°W; SK819277 | | Map | Citation | This medieval park has unimproved rough grassland with a scatter of ancient oaks and hawthorns. The breeding birds are diverse, and more than ninety lichen species have been recorded, including many which are uncommon. |
| Debdale Meadow, Muston | Debdale Meadow | ✓ | | 4.3 hectares (11 acres) | NO | Grantham; 52.944°N 0.76°W; SK834393 | | Map | Citation | This traditionally managed meadow has diverse flora typical of the clay soils of the Midlands, and it has evidence of medieval ridge and furrow cultivation. Flora include cowslip, bulbous buttercup and pepper-saxifrage. |
| Dimminsdale | Dimminsdale | ✓ | ✓ | 36.9 hectares (91 acres) | PP | Coalville; 52.79°N 1.443°W; SK376216 | GCR, LRWT | Map (Note: Dimminsdale is partly in Derbyshire.) | Citation | Dimminsdale has semi-natural woodland and one of the largest areas of unimproved acidic grassland in the county. Earl Ferrers' lead mine, which is located on the site, has a unique and complex mixture of minerals such as galena and zinc blende; their genesis is little understood and they provide great potential for research. |
| Donington Park | Donington Park | ✓ | | 38.9 hectares (96 acres) | NO | Loughborough; 52.837°N 1.386°W; SK414268 | | Map | Citation | The park was mentioned in the Domesday Book, and it has been managed as a deer park for all of its recorded history. Most of it has a short grass sward, with areas of bracken and ancient oaks, which provide a habitat for rare beetles and spiders. |
| Enderby Warren Quarry | Enderby Warren Quarry | | ✓ | 1.6 hectares (4.0 acres) | NO | Leicester; 52.595°N 1.204°W; SK540000 | GCR | Map | Citation | This former quarry is described by Natural England as nationally important as it is the only one in Britain where it can be shown that palygorskite clay soil has been formed by the action of groundwater on Triassic and pre-Triassic sediments. |
| Eye Brook Reservoir | Eye Brook Reservoir | ✓ | | 201.3 hectares (497 acres) | NO | Uppingham; 52.551°N 0.745°W; SP 852 955 | | Map (Note: Eye Brook Reservoir is partly in Rutland.) | Citation | The reservoir is an important site for wintering wildfowl, such as wigeon, teal, mallard and pochard. Other habitats are marsh, mudflats, grassland, broad-leaved woodland and plantations. |
| Eye Brook Valley Woods | Great Merrible Wood | ✓ | | 65.7 hectares (162 acres) | PP | Uppingham; 52.563°N 0.782°W; SP826969 | LRWT | Map | Citation | These are surviving fragments of the medieval Leighfield Forest. Park Wood is mainly ash and wych elm, while Bolt Wood and Great Merrible Wood are dominated by ash and field maple. The shrub flora is diverse, and there are also several small pools and marshes. |
| Frisby Marsh | Frisby Marsh | ✓ | | 10.1 hectares (25 acres) | YES | Loughborough; 52.749°N 0.985°W; SK686174 | | Map | Citation | This site has spring-fed marshes, grassland, woodland and a pool and channel which are the surviving parts of a former ox-bow lake of the adjacent River Wreake. The marshes have a rich flora, with plants such as marsh valerian and marsh arrowgrass. |
| Gipsy Lane Pit | Gipsy Lane Pit | | ✓ | 0.5 hectares (1.2 acres) | NO | Leicester; 52.658°N 1.086°W; SK619071 | GCR | Map | Citation | This site is important to geologists for its Triassic stratigraphy, and to mineralogists as it is rich in sulphides, some of which are unidentified and imperfectly understood compounds. Natural England describes the site's interest as "unique in Britain, and possibly internationally". |
| Grace Dieu and High Sharpley | Grace Dieu and High Sharpley | ✓ | ✓ | 86 hectares (210 acres) | PP | Coalville; 52.748°N 1.352°W; SK438170 | GCR | Map | Citation | This site is composed of several fragments of the formerly extensive Charnwood Forest, and it has diverse habitats of heath, woodland, rock, scrub and acid grassland. Grace Dieu Quarry exhibits a thin marine Lower Carboniferous layer of Carboniferous Limestone, close to the Midland shoreline around 340 million years ago. |
| Grantham Canal | Grantham Canal | ✓ | | 9.4 hectares (23 acres) | YES | Grantham; 52.895°N 0.867°W; SK763337 | | Map | Citation | This site has diverse aquatic and terrestrial habitats, which supports a varied insect community. The canal has floating plants such as fat duckweed and water fern, and there are breeding birds such as sedge warblers, moorhens and reed warblers. |
| Great Bowden Borrowpit | Great Bowden Borrow | ✓ | | 2.4 hectares (5.9 acres) | NO | Market Harborough; 52.501°N 0.906°W; SP743898 | | Map | Citation | This former railway borrow pit has an unusual marsh, dominated by soft rush, tufted hair grass and cottongrass. Other plants include bulrush and bog moss. Snipe feed on the site. |
| Groby Pool and Woods | Groby Pool | ✓ | | 29 hectares (72 acres) | YES | Leicester; 52.669°N 1.233°W; SK519082 | | Map | Citation | Groby Pool is the largest natural lake in the county, and it is used by many wintering wildfowl. The marginal vegetation is diverse, and there is also wet woodland and meadows which have grasses such as common bent, sweet vernal grass and crested dog's-tail. |
| Harby Hill Wood | Harby Hill Wood | ✓ | | 17.2 hectares (43 acres) | FP | Melton Mowbray; 52.848°N 0.869°W; SK762285 | | Map | Citation | This site has steeply sloping ash and sycamore woodland, with areas of spring-fed marsh and colonies of wild daffodils. There is also an area of species-rich dry grassland, which has flora such as pignut and musk thistle. |
| Holly Rock Fields | Holly Rock Fields | ✓ | | 3.9 hectares (9.6 acres) | NO | Coalville; 52.725°N 1.319°W; SK461144 | | Map | Citation | This is a nationally important site as most of it is the nationally scarce National Vegetation Classification type MG5, crested dog’s-tail and common knapweed grassland. The fields have not been subject to agricultural intensification, and they are floristically diverse. |
| Holwell Mouth | Holwell Mouth | ✓ | | 15.7 hectares (39 acres) | YES | Melton Mowbray; 52.813°N 0.927°W; SK724245 | CL | Map | Citation | This marsh on Jurassic clay is in the valley of the River Smite, which runs through the site. There are also areas of grassland, bracken and woodland, and the diverse habitats support a range of birds and insects. |
| Ives Head | Ives Head | | ✓ | 4.0 hectares (9.9 acres) | NO | Coalville; 52.749°N 1.293°W; SK478170 | GCR | Map | Citation | This site exposes volcaniclastic sandstones dating to the late Precambrian, around 600 million years ago. It is important for the global understanding of the early evolution of Ediacaran environments. |
| Kendall's Meadow | Kendall's Meadow hedge | ✓ | | 2.6 hectares (6.4 acres) | NO | Hinckley; 52.578°N 1.421°W; SP393980 | | Map | Citation | Over a dozen grass species grow on this traditionally managed hay meadow, such as common bent, red fescue, crested dog's tail and yellow oat grass. There are also many herbs including cat's ear and yellow rattle. |
| Kilby - Foxton Canal | Kilby – Foxton Canal | ✓ | | 32 hectares (79 acres) | YES | Leicester; 52.557°N 1.039°W; SP652959 | | Map | Citation | Nine species of pondweed have been recorded on the canal, two of which are nationally rare, and submerged plants include Nuttall's waterweed and yellow water-lily. Fleckney Tunnel has a long established colony of Daubenton's bats. |
| King Lud's Entrenchments and The Drift | The Drift | ✓ | | 23.9 hectares (59 acres) | YES | Melton Mowbray; 52.842°N 0.721°W; SK862280 | SM | Map (Note: King Lud's Entrenchments and The Drift is partly in Lincolnshire.) | Citation | This site has limestone grassland with tor-grass, cock's foot, crested dog's-tail and red fescue. Herbs include salad burnet, field scabious, germander speedwell and perforate St John's-wort, and there is also some broad-leaved semi-natural woodland. |
| Launde Big Wood | Launde Big Wood | ✓ | | 41.1 hectares (102 acres) | YES | Leicester; 52.625°N 0.84°W; SK786037 | LRWT | Map | Citation | This wood on heavy clay is dominated by ash, and in some areas by wych elm. The ground layer has flora typical of ancient clay woods, such as bluebell, forget-me-not, yellow archangel and giant bellflower. |
| Leighfield Forest | Leighfield Forest | ✓ | | 149.7 hectares (370 acres) | PP | Leicester; 52.611°N 0.858°W; SK774021 | NCR | Map | Citation | These woods in the Eye Brook valley date back at least to the thirteenth century. The dominant trees are ash and oak. The diverse moths and beetles include some rare species, and others are at the northern limit of their distribution. There are also areas of grassland and marsh. |
| Lockington Marshes | Lockington Marshes | ✓ | | 11.3 hectares (28 acres) | NO | Loughborough; 52.863°N 1.278°W; SK487298 | | Map | Citation | This site in the floodplains of the River Soar and River Trent has a periodically flooded meadow, pools and one of the largest areas of willow carr in the county. The invertebrate fauna includes nationally rare beetles and flies, and scarce species such as the water beetle batenus livens and the weevil anthribus fasciatus. |
| Loughborough Meadows | Loughborough Meadows | ✓ | | 60.5 hectares (149 acres) | YES | Loughborough; 52.791°N 1.206°W; SK536218 | LRWT | Map | Citation | This is the largest area of unimproved alluvial flood meadow in the county, and wet areas are dominated by creeping bent and marsh foxtail. A brook has large areas of marsh foxtail, and there is a field with breeding lapwings and redshanks. |
| Lount Meadows | Lount Meadows | ✓ | | 8.5 hectares (21 acres) | NO | Coalville; 52.768°N 1.429°W; SK386191 | | Map | Citation | This slightly acidic grassland site has hay meadows with diverse grass species. There are also areas of species-rich rough pasture, scrub and marsh, which is dominated by plicate sweet-grass and water horsetail. |
| Main Quarry, Mountsorrel | Main Quarry, Mountsorrel | | ✓ | 14.6 hectares (36 acres) | NO | Leicester; 52.727°N 1.147°W; SK577148 | GCR | Map | Citation | According to Natural England, this site "is probably the most dramatic and well-developed occurrence of asphaltite in Britain upon which international research into the origin of life on Earth has been carried out." |
| Misterton Marshes | Misterton Marshes | ✓ | | 6.8 hectares (17 acres) | NO | Lutterworth; 52.461°N 1.181°W; SP557852 | | Map | Citation | This is one of the largest areas of unimproved wetland in the county. Its large areas of tall fen are dominated by common reed, reed canary grass and lesser pond-sedge. There is also an area of grazed marsh and a stream. |
| Muston Meadows | Muston Meadows | ✓ | | 8.7 hectares (21 acres) | YES | Grantham; 52.919°N 0.775°W; SK824365 | NCR, NNR | Map | Citation | These ridge and furrow meadows are on soils derived from clay. Herbs include green-winged orchid, lady's bedstraw, yellow rattle, pepper saxifrage and cowslip. |
| Narborough Bog | Narborough Bog | ✓ | | 8.5 hectares (21 acres) | YES | Leicester; 52.576°N 1.191°W; SP549979 | LRWT | Map | Citation | This site has a large area of common reed on peat, and there is also wet woodland, dominated by crack willow. Both areas have diverse species of butterflies and moths, including several which are locally uncommon. In the south of the site there are two wet grazed meadows and more woodland. |
| Newhurst Quarry | Newhurst Quarry | | ✓ | 9.4 hectares (23 acres) | NO | Shepshed; 52.756°N 1.282°W; SK485179 | GCR | Map | Citation | This is the only British site where hypogene mineralisation, deep in the earth, has been weathered during the Triassic, around 225 million years ago. It is also the only British site to have the minerals coulsonite and vesignieite. |
| Newton Burgoland Marshes | Newton Burgoland Marshes | ✓ | | 8.6 hectares (21 acres) | NO | Coalville; 52.676°N 1.437°W; SK381089 | | Map | Citation | This site is in two areas, with the northern one having wet grassland and species rich marsh, while the southern one is well-drained grassland. Herbs in the marsh include ragged robin, marsh marigold, meadow thistle and southern marsh orchid. |
| Oakley Wood | Oakley Wood | ✓ | | 48.1 hectares (119 acres) | NO | Loughborough; 52.789°N 1.282°W; SK485216 | | Map | Citation | This site provides the only example in the county of the transition from oak woodland on free draining acid soil to the ash and hazel typical of the heavy clays of eastern central England. Rides add to the variety of flora, with woodland species such as lily of the valley and yellow archangel. |
| One Barrow Plantation | One Barrow Plantation | | ✓ | 1.8 hectares (4.4 acres) | NO | Shepshed; 52.749°N 1.315°W; SK463171 | GCR | Map | Citation | This site exposes rocks dating to the late Precambrian, around 600 million years ago. The deposits are mainly volcanic ash, thought to have been deposited in the sea from volcanoes on neighbouring islands similar to those now found on the western edge of the Pacific Ocean. |
| Owston Woods | Owston Woods | ✓ | | 139.5 hectares (345 acres) | YES | Oakham; 52.65°N 0.836°W; SK788065 | | Map | Citation | The dominant trees in these woods on Jurassic and glacial clay are ash and hazel. There are diverse moths, beetles and other insects, including some rare species, and there is also a variety of birds and small mammals. |
| Pasture and Asplin Woods | Pasture Wood | ✓ | | 40.9 hectares (101 acres) | NO | Shepshed; 52.789°N 1.372°W; SK424215 | | Map | Citation | These ancient woods on poorly drained clay soils are dominated by ash, with a shrub layer of hazel and hawthorn. There are herbs characteristic of ancient woodland, such as wood anemone and sweet woodruff. |
| River Eye | River Eye | ✓ | | 6 hectares (15 acres) | PP | Melton Mowbray; 52.759°N 0.855°W; SK773186 | NCR | Map | Citation | This unpolluted clay stream has rich and diverse flora and fauna. Marginal vegetation includes bulrush, branched bur-reed and greater pond sedge, while shallow, fast-flowing stretches have curled pondweed and perfoliate pondweed. |
| River Mease | River Mease | ✓ | | 22.8 hectares (56 acres) | PP | Coalville; 52.704°N 1.592°W; SK276120 | SAC | Map (Note: River Mease is partly in Staffordshire.) | Citation | The river has nationally significant populations of two species of freshwater fish, spined loach and bullhead. Vegetation is sparse in the upper reaches as the stream is fast-flowing, but there are stands of floating sweet-grass, and aquatic flora is more varied lower down, where the river flows slowly across a flood plain. |
| Roecliffe Manor Lawns | Roecliffe Manor Lawns | ✓ | | 1.2 hectares (3.0 acres) | NO | Leicester; 52.707°N 1.215°W; SK531125 | | Map | Citation | This grassland site on Precambrian rocks has a wide variety of fungi, including several species listed in the provisional Red Data Book of threatened species for fungi. There are many mushrooms of the genus Entoloma. |
| Saddington Reservoir | Saddington Reservoir | ✓ | | 19 hectares (47 acres) | YES | Market Harborough; 52.512°N 1.024°W; SP663910 | | Map | Citation | The reservoir has a range of wetland habitats, such as open water, wet willow woodland and swamp. There are a number of nationally scarce beetles, such as Carabus monilis, Atheta basicornis, Eledona agricola and Gyrophaena lucidula. |
| Sheepy Fields | Sheepy Fields | ✓ | | 4.9 hectares (12 acres) | NO | Market Bosworth; 52.619°N 1.511°W; SK332025 | | Map | Citation | The two hay meadows in this site are on post-glacial river terrace deposits. There are diverse herbs such as lady's mantle, adder's tongue, hayrattle, pepper saxifrage, bulbous buttercup and cowslip. |
| Sheet Hedges Wood | Sheet Hedges Wood | ✓ | | 21.7 hectares (54 acres) | YES | Leicester; 52.672°N 1.219°W; SK529086 | | Map | Citation | This is typical of ancient woods on clay soils in central and eastern England, and ash is dominant in the canopy, while the shrub layer has hazel, field maple, hawthorn, elder and privet. |
| Shepshed Cutting | Shepshed Cutting | | ✓ | 5.8 hectares (14 acres) | YES | Shepshed; 52.762°N 1.319°W; SK460185 | | Map | Citation | The Triassic deposits in Shepshed Cutting are unique, with a flat sheet of galena resting on red clay, and the whole enclosed in sandstone. The site is described by Natural England as "of international importance for developing a better understanding of the origins of mineral deposits and the processes which form them". |
| Sproxton Quarry | Sproxton Quarry | | ✓ | 5.4 hectares (13 acres) | YES | Melton Mowbray; 52.817°N 0.719°W; SK864252 | GCR | Map | Citation | The quarry exposes one of the most complete sections of the Middle Jurassic Lincolnshire Limestone Formation, together with the underlying Grantham and Northampton Sand Formations. It has rare ammonites. Sproxton Quarry is a Reference Section for the Grantham Formation. |
| Stanford Park | Stanford Park | ✓ | | 20.4 hectares (50 acres) | YES | Lutterworth; 52.406°N 1.14°W; SP586791 | | Map | Citation | The park has avenues of oak trees, together with other large trees in an area of pasture. It has the most diverse lichens in the county on the bark of mature trees and on old stonework, including fifteen species not recorded elsewhere in Leicestershire. |
| Stonesby Quarry | Stonesby Quarry | ✓ | | 3.2 hectares (7.9 acres) | YES | Melton Mowbray; 52.817°N 0.796°W; SK812251 | LRWT | Map | Citation | This site on Jurassic Lincolnshire Limestone has grassland with diverse herb species, such as autumn gentian, cowslip, dwarf thistle, small scabious, pyramidal orchid and clustered bellflower. |
| Swithland Wood and The Brand | Swithland Wood | ✓ | | 87.9 hectares (217 acres). | YES | Leicester; 52.706°N 1.203°W; SK539124 | GCR, NCR | Map | Citation | Swithland Wood is typical of the acid and loamy soils of the Midlands, and its dominant trees are sessile oak, silver birch and small-leaved lime. The Brand is a former slate quarry which has many lichens, including species rare in the region. |
| Terrace Hills Pasture | Terrace Hill Pasture | ✓ | | 11.2 hectares (28 acres) | PP | Grantham; 52.869°N 0.821°W; SK794309 | | Map | Citation | This site has been designated an SSSI as an example of old calcareous pasture, but some areas are former quarries, and as a result there is an undulating terrain. The dominant grasses are crested dog's-tail, sweet vernal grass and red fescue, and there is also a small stream with an area of marsh. |
| Tilton Cutting | Tilton Cutting | | ✓ | 4.4 hectares (11 acres) | YES | Leicester; 52.64°N 0.873°W; SK763053 | GCR, LRWT | Map | Citation | This is the best site in the East Midlands which exposes the sequence of rocks in the Lower Jurassic around 180 million years ago. There are many fossils, including Tiltoniceras acutum, an age-diagnostic ammonite. The site has rich flora and diverse common birds. |
| Twenty Acre Piece | Twenty Acre Piece | ✓ | | 8 hectares (20 acres) | YES | Loughborough; 52.782°N 1.051°W; SK641210 | CL | Map | Citation | This site has grassland, scrub and wood on poorly drained acidic clay. The woodland is mainly hawthorn, oak and ash, and there are diverse populations of breeding invertebrates and birds. |
| Ulverscroft Valley | Ulverscroft Valley | ✓ | | 110.7 hectares (274 acres) | PP | Leicester; 52.709°N 1.273°W; SK492127 | LRWT, NT, SM | Map | Citation | This is described by Natural England as one of the best wildlife sites in the county, with grassland, heath, woodland and wetlands. Over 200 plant species have been recorded, with an especially rich flora in wet areas and diverse species of moths. |
| Wymondham Rough | Wymondham Rough | ✓ | | 5.9 hectares (15 acres) | YES | Melton Mowbray; 52.748°N 0.77°W; SK831175 | LRWT | Map | Citation | This clay grassland has a rich flora, dominated by common bent, Yorkshire fog, false oat-grass and cock's foot. A poorly drained area has plants such as water avens, and there are drier soils in the west of the site. |

== See also ==
- List of local nature reserves in Leicestershire
- Leicestershire and Rutland Wildlife Trust

== Sources ==
- Ratcliffe, Derek, ed. (1977). A Nature Conservation Review. Vol. 2. Cambridge, UK: Cambridge University Press. ISBN 0-521-21403-3.
