= Saddington Reservoir =

Reservoir in Leicestershire, England

Coordinates: 52.512°N 1.024°W

- Site of Special Scientific Interest
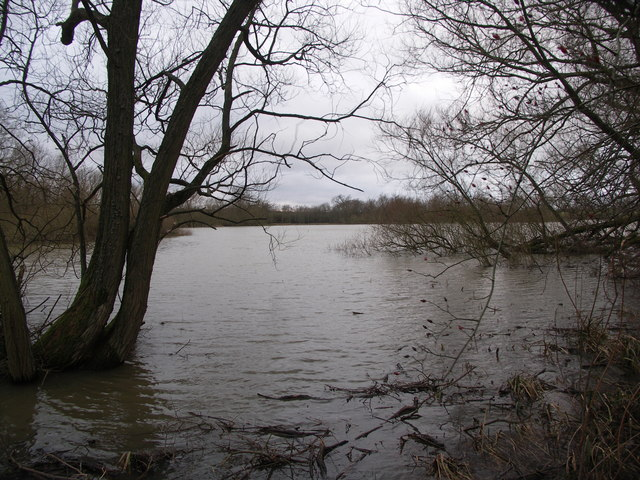
- Location of Saddington Reservoir.
- Area of search: Leicestershire
- Grid reference: SP 663 910
- Interest: Biological
- Area: 19.1 hectares (47 acres)
- Notification date: 1999
- Location map: Magic Map

Saddington Reservoir is a canal reservoir and 19.1 hectares (47 acres) biological Site of Special Scientific Interest south of Saddington in Leicestershire. The reservoir was built between 1793 and 1797 to supply water to the Grand Union Canal.

The reservoir has a range of wetland habitats, such as open water, wet willow woodland and swamp. There are a number of nationally scarce beetles, such as Carabus monilis, Atheta basicornis, Eledona agricola and Gyrophaena lucidula.

There is public access to the site.
