= Lount (disambiguation) =

Lount is a hamlet in Leicestershire, England.

Lount may also mean:

== Surname ==
- Samuel Lount (1791–1838), rebellion organiser in Canada
- William Lount (1840–1903), Canadian lawyer and politician

== Places ==
- Lount Township, Ontario, in Central Ontario

== Other uses ==
- Lount Meadows, in Lount, Leicestershire
- New Lount, a nature reserve in Leicestershire
- Samuel Lount (film)
