= Roecliffe Manor Lawns =

Protected area in Leicestershire, England

Coordinates: 52.707°N 1.215°W

- Site of Special Scientific Interest
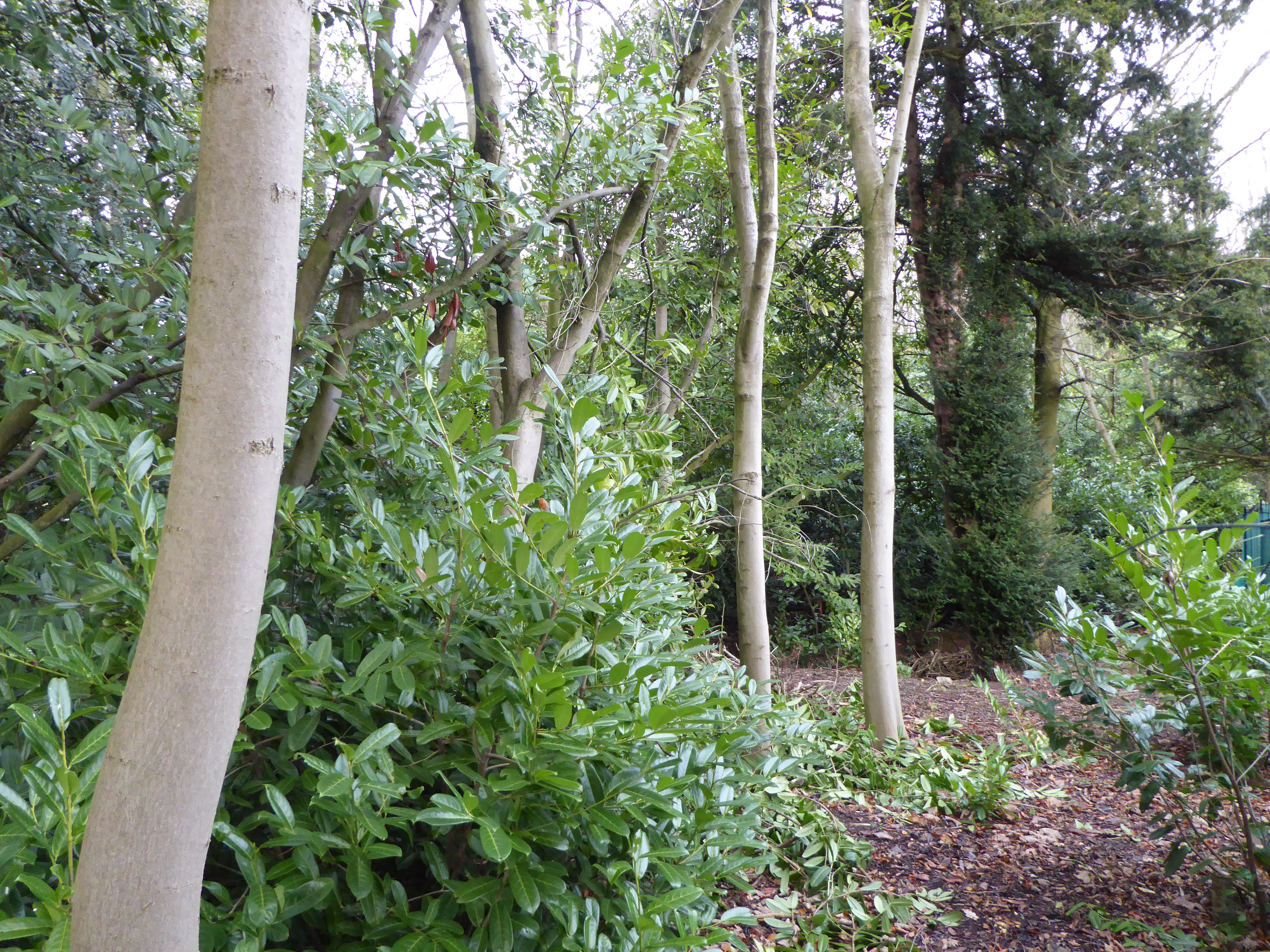
- Location of Roecliffe Manor Lawns.
- Area of search: Leicestershire
- Grid reference: SK 531 125
- Interest: Biological
- Area: 1.28 hectares (3.2 acres)
- Notification date: 2001
- Location map: Magic Map

Roecliffe Manor Lawns is a 1.28 hectares (3.2 acres) biological Site of Special Scientific Interest south of Woodhouse Eaves in Leicestershire.

This grassland site on Precambrian rocks has a wide variety of fungi, including several species listed in the provisional Red Data Book of threatened species for fungi. There are many mushrooms of the genus Entoloma.

The site is private land with no public access.
