= Allexton Wood =

UK Site of Special Scientific Interest

Coordinates: 52.586°N 0.788°W

- Site of Special Scientific Interest
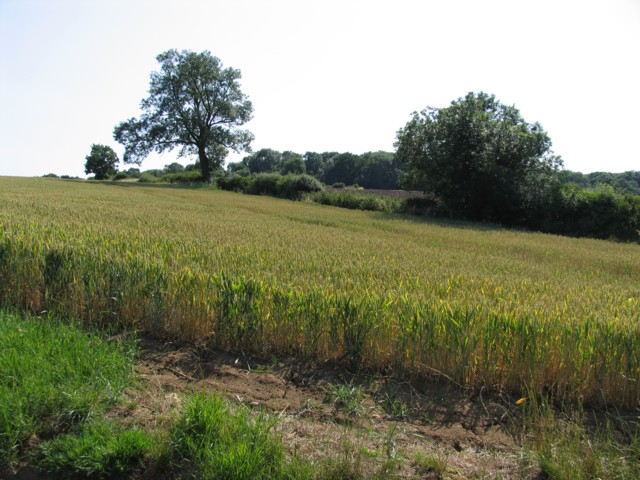
- Location of Allexton Wood.
- Area of search: Leicestershire
- Grid reference: SP 821 994
- Interest: Biological
- Area: 25.9 hectares
- Notification date: 1983
- Location map: Magic Map

Allexton Wood is a 25.9-hectare (64-acre) biological Site of Special Scientific Interest north-east of Hallaton in Leicestershire.

This coppice semi-natural wood is on soils derived from glacial and Jurassic clays. The dominant tree is ash, and elm and pedunculate oak are also common. There are several small streams with populations of opposite-leaved golden saxifrage.

The site is private property with no public access.
