= Owston Woods =

Protected area in Leicestershire, England

Coordinates: 52.65°N 0.836°W

- Site of Special Scientific Interest
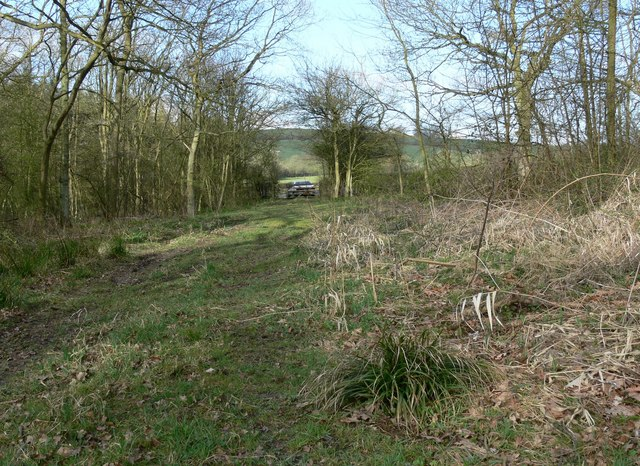
- Location of Owston Woods.
- Area of search: Leicestershire
- Grid reference: SK 790 065
- Interest: Biological
- Area: 139.6 hectares (345 acres)
- Notification date: 1983
- Location map: Magic Map

Owston Woods is a 139.6 hectares (345 acres) biological Site of Special Scientific Interest south of Owston in Leicestershire.

The dominant trees in these woods on Jurassic and glacial clay are ash and hazel. There are diverse moths, beetles and other insects, including some rare species, and there is also a variety of birds and small mammals.

A public footpath goes through the woods.
