= Enderby Warren Quarry =

Quarry in Leicestershire, England

Coordinates: 52.595°N 1.204°W

- Site of Special Scientific Interest
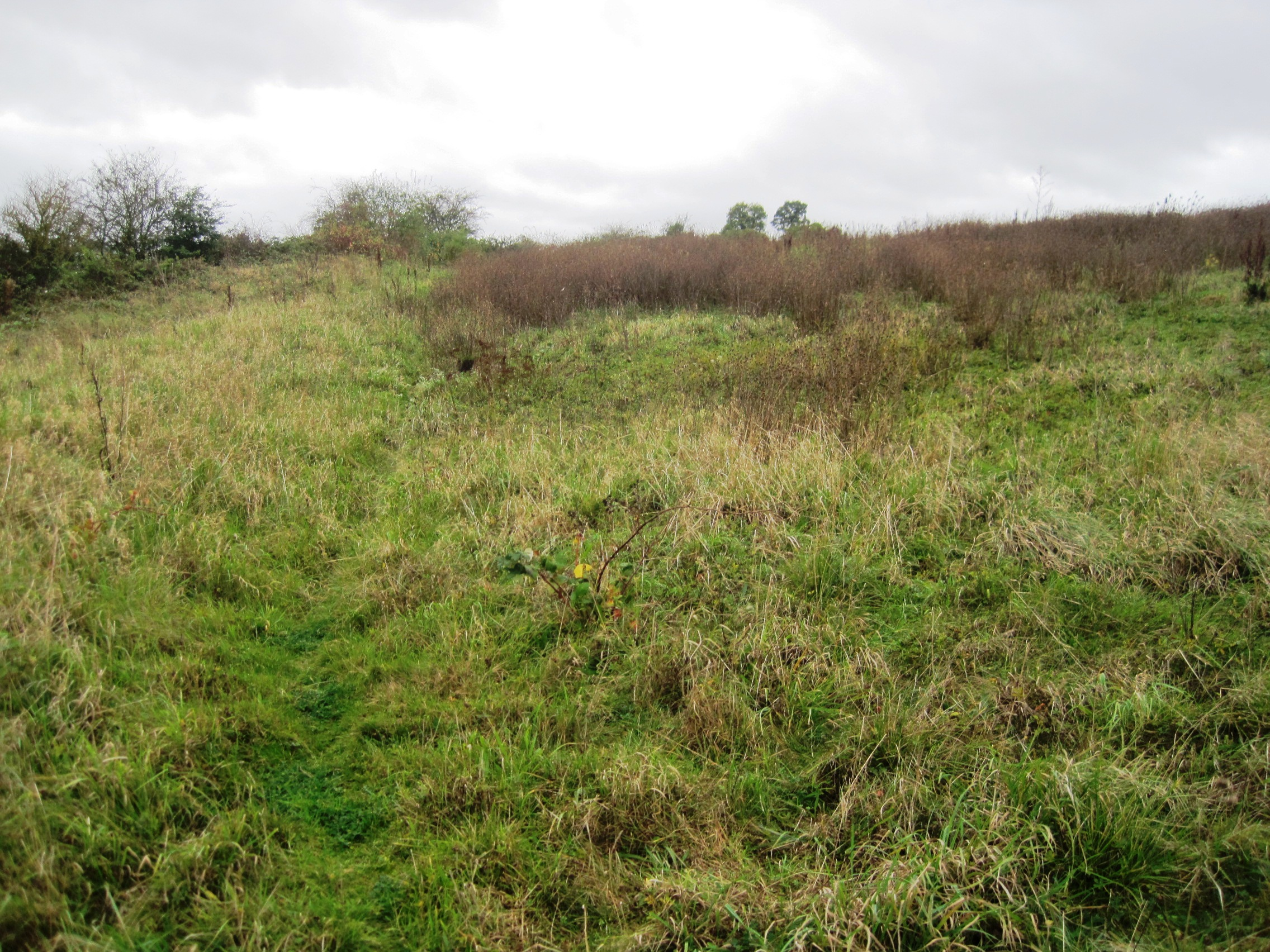
- Location of Enderby Warren Quarry.
- Area of search: Leicestershire
- Grid reference: SK 541 000
- Interest: Geological
- Area: 1.7 hectares
- Notification date: 1987
- Location map: Magic Map

Enderby Warren Quarry is a 1.7-hectare (4.2-acre) geological Site of Special Scientific Interest north of Enderby in Leicestershire. It is a Geological Conservation Review site.

This former quarry is described by Natural England as nationally important as it is the only one in Britain where it can be shown that palygorskite clay soil has been formed by the action of groundwater on Triassic and pre-Triassic sediments.

The site is private land with no public access.
