= Barrow Gravel Pits =

Site of Special Scientific Interest in Barrow upon Soar, Leicestershire

Coordinates: 52.744°N 1.158°W

- Site of Special Scientific Interest
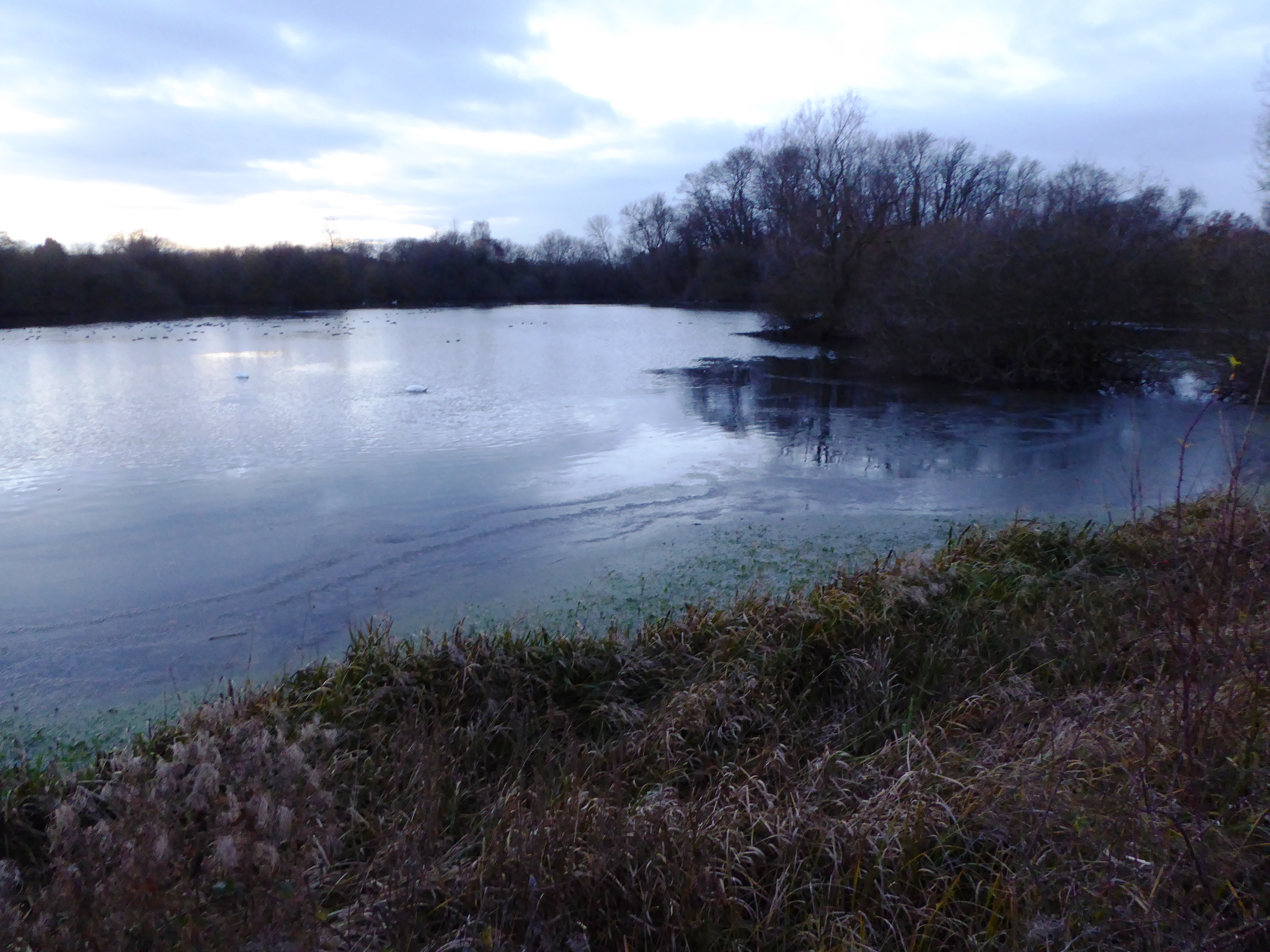
- Location of Barrow Gravel Pits.
- Area of search: Leicestershire
- Grid reference: SK 568 166
- Interest: Biological
- Area: 35.6 hectares (88 acres)
- Notification date: 1983
- Location map: Magic Map

Barrow Gravel Pits is a 35.6 hectares (88 acres) biological Site of Special Scientific Interest in Barrow upon Soar in Leicestershire.

This site in the flood plain of the River Soar has open water in the former gravel pits, marshes, hay meadows, woodland and scrub. Aquatic plants include yellow water lily, rigid hornwort, lesser pondweed and fan-leaved water crowfoot.

There is access through a caravan park from Bridge Street.
