= Gipsy Lane Pit =

Protected area in Leicester, England

Coordinates: 52.658°N 1.086°W

- Site of Special Scientific Interest
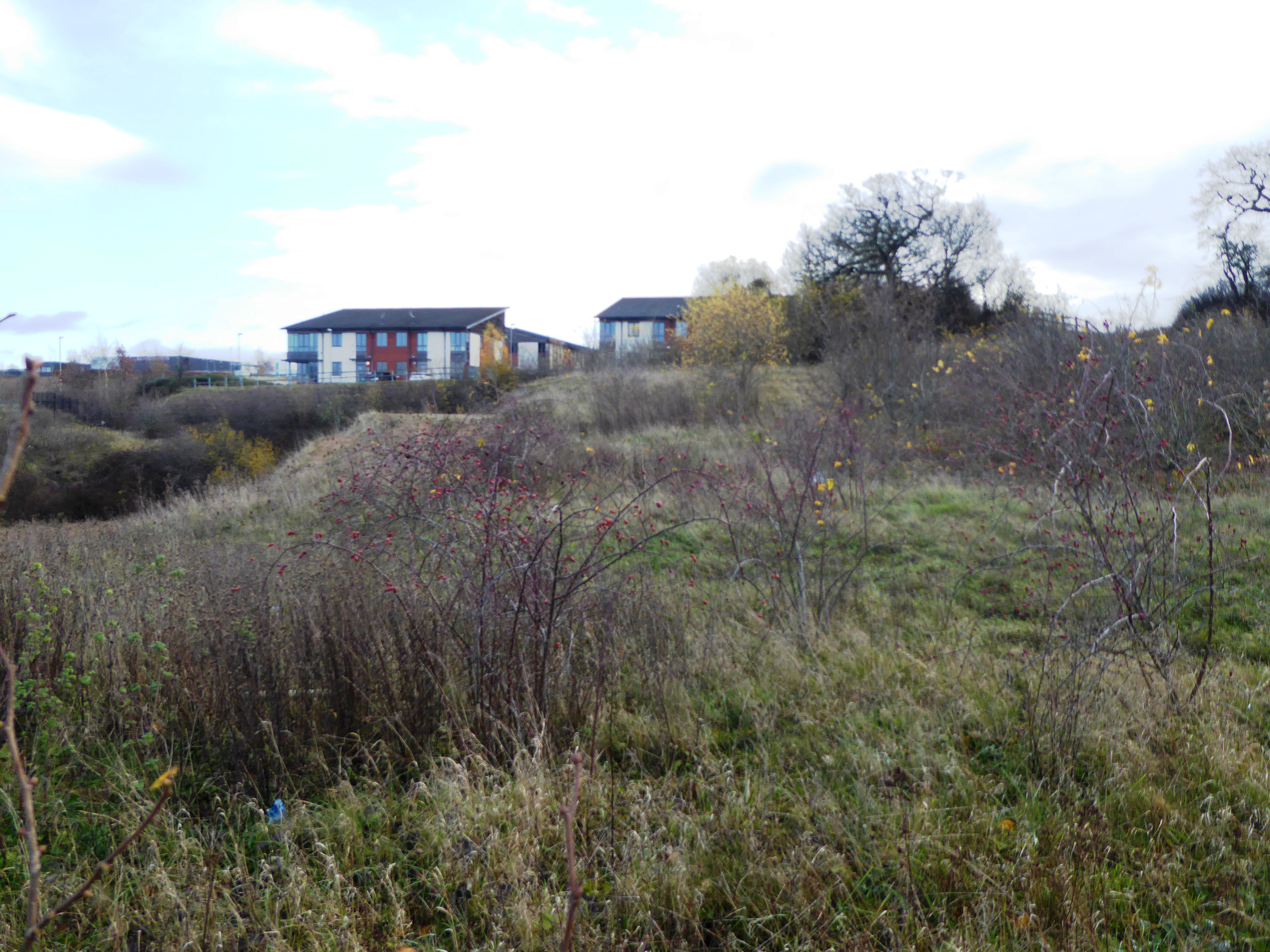
- Location of Gipsy Lane Pit.
- Area of search: Leicestershire
- Grid reference: SK 619 071
- Interest: Geological
- Area: 0.5 hectares (1.2 acres)
- Notification date: 1985
- Location map: Magic Map

Gipsy Lane Pit is a 0.5 hectares (1.2 acres) geological Site of Special Scientific Interest in Leicester. It is a Geological Conservation Review site.

This site is important to geologists for its Triassic stratigraphy, and to mineralogists as it is rich in sulphides, some of which are unidentified and imperfectly understood compounds. Natural England describes the site's interest as "unique in Britain, and possibly internationally".

The site is private land with no public access.
