= Newton Burgoland Marshes =

Protected area in Leicestershire, England

Coordinates: 52.676°N 1.437°W

- Site of Special Scientific Interest
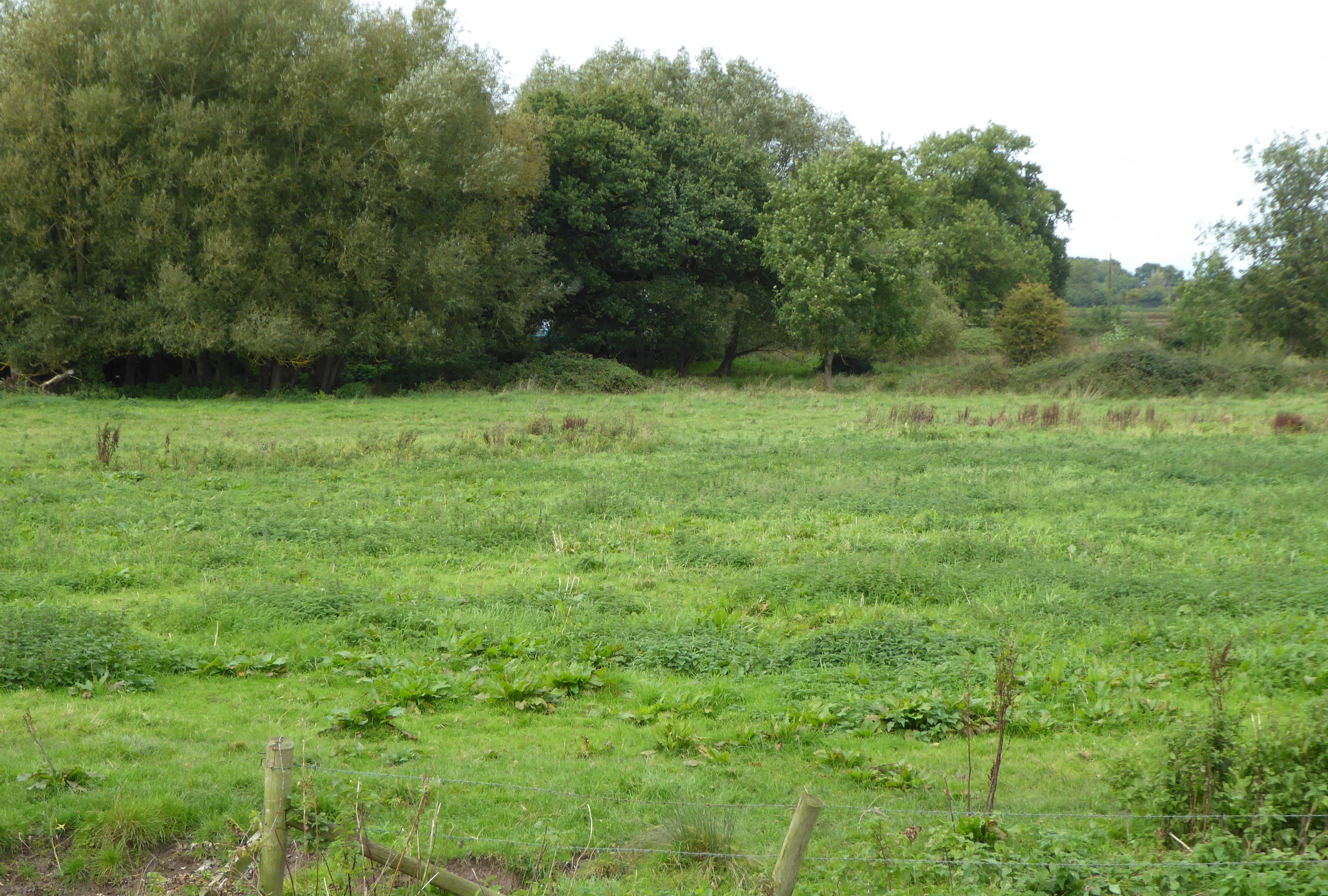
- Newton Burgoland Marshes north
- Location of Newton Burgoland Marshes.
- Area of search: Leicestershire
- Grid reference: SK 381 087
- Interest: Biological
- Area: 8.7 hectares
- Notification date: 1983
- Location map: Magic Map

Newton Burgoland Marshes is an 8.7-hectare (21-acre) biological Site of Special Scientific Interest east of Newton Burgoland in Leicestershire.

This site is in two areas, with the northern one having wet grassland and species rich marsh, while the southern one is well-drained grassland. Herbs in the marsh include ragged robin, marsh marigold, meadow thistle and southern marsh orchid.

The site is private land with no public access.
