= Misterton Marshes =

Wetland in Leicestershire, England

Coordinates: 52.461°N 1.181°W

- Site of Special Scientific Interest
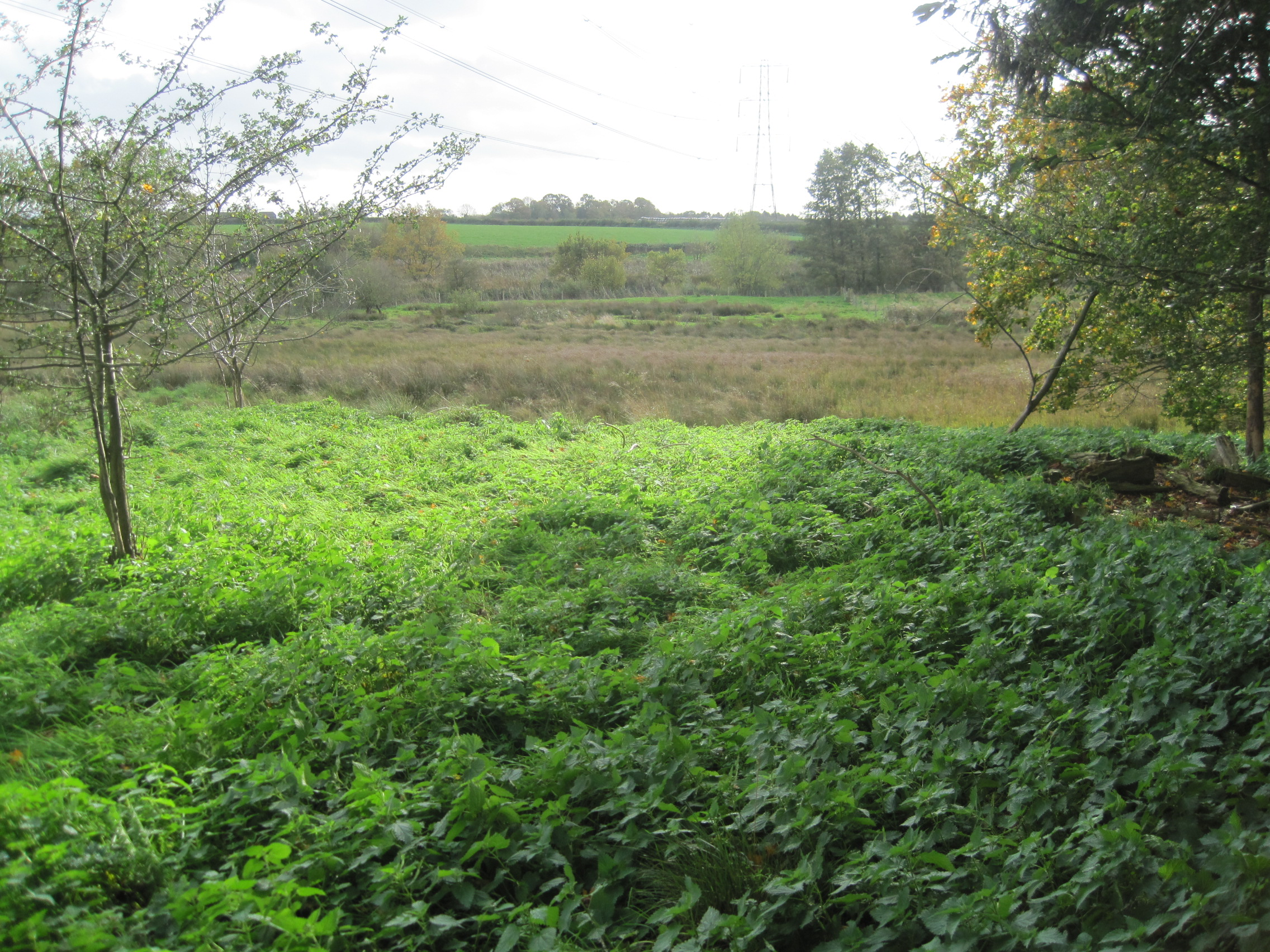
- Location of Misterton Marshes.
- Area of search: Leicestershire
- Grid reference: SP 556 851
- Interest: Biological
- Area: 6.8 hectares
- Notification date: 1986
- Location map: Magic Map

Misterton Marshes is a 6.8-hectare (17-acre) biological Site of Special Scientific Interest north of Misterton in Leicestershire.

This is one of the largest areas of unimproved wetland in the county. Its large areas of tall fen are dominated by common reed, reed canary grass and lesser pond-sedge. There is also an area of grazed marsh and a stream.

The site is private land with no public access.
