= Twenty Acre Piece =

Coordinates: 52°47′01″N 1°03′00″W

- Site of Special Scientific Interest
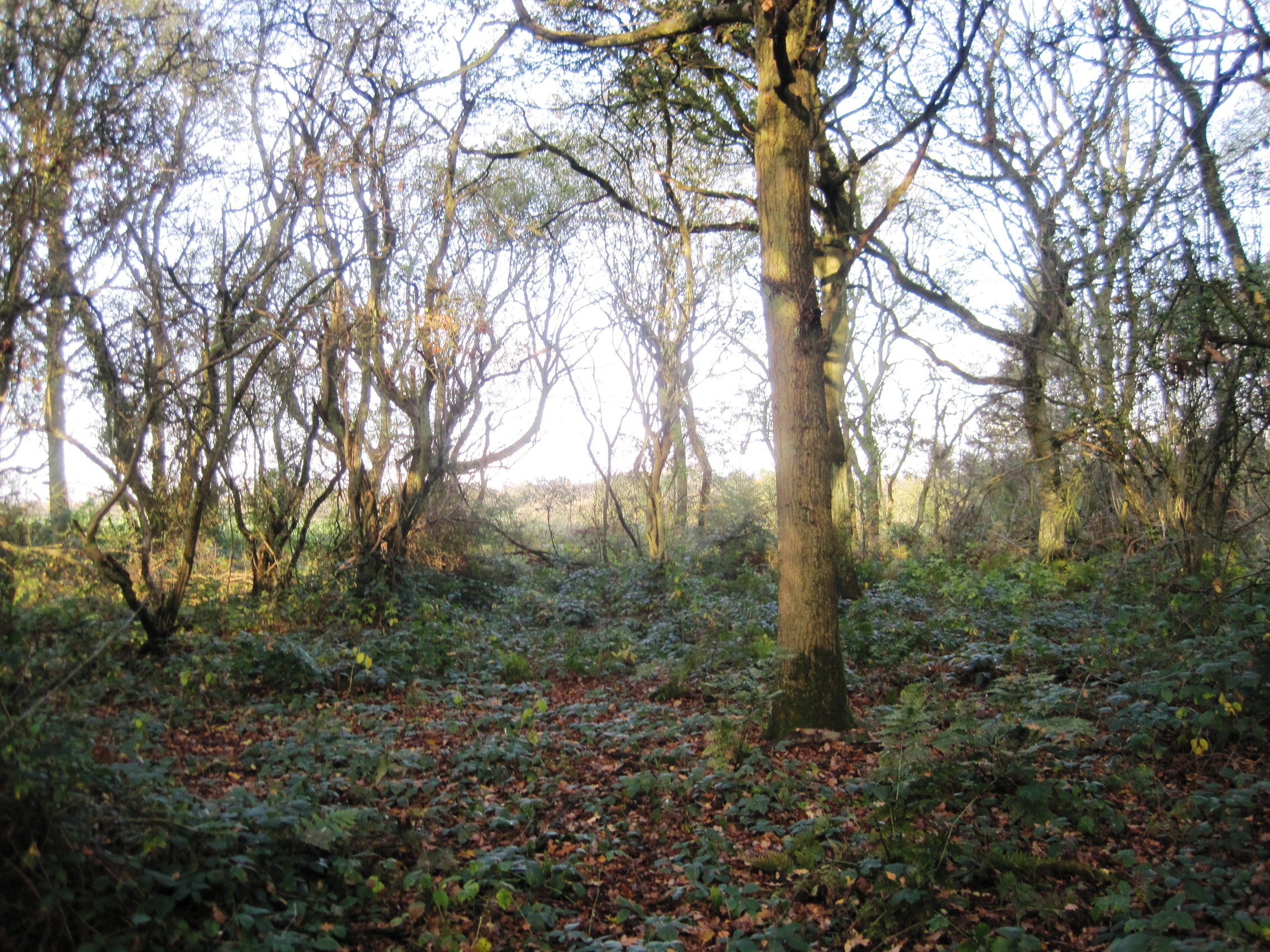
- Location of Twenty Acre Piece.
- Area of search: Leicestershire
- Grid reference: SK 641 210
- Interest: Biological
- Area: 8.1 ha (20 acres)
- Notification date: 1983
- Location map: Magic Map

Twenty Acre Piece is an 8.1-hectare (20-acre) biological Site of Special Scientific Interest and registered common land east of Loughborough in Leicestershire.

This site has grassland, scrub and wood on poorly drained acidic clay. The woodland is mainly hawthorn, oak and ash, and there are diverse populations of breeding invertebrates and birds.

There is access to the site by a neglected and overgrown footpath.
