= Main Quarry, Mountsorrel =

Protected area in Leicestershire, England

Coordinates: 52.727°N 1.147°W

- Site of Special Scientific Interest
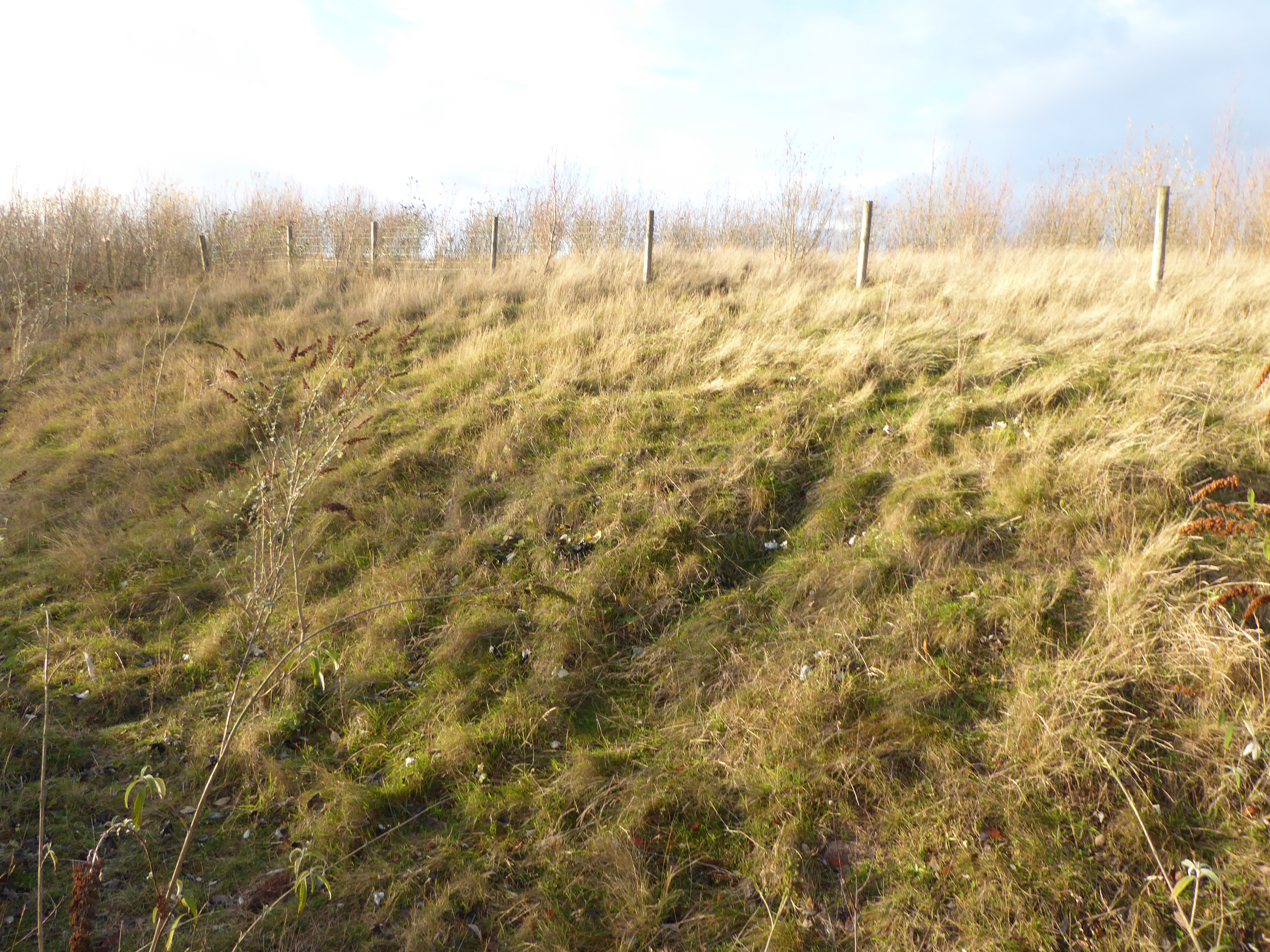
- Location of Main Quarry, Mountsorrel.
- Area of search: Leicestershire
- Grid reference: SK 577 148
- Interest: Geological
- Area: 14.7 hectares (36 acres)
- Notification date: 1984
- Location map: Magic Map

Main Quarry or Castle Hill Quarry is a 14.7 hectares (36 acres) geological Site of Special Scientific Interest in Mountsorrel in Leicestershire. It is a Geological Conservation Review site.

According to Natural England, this site "is probably the most dramatic and well-developed occurrence of asphaltite in Britain upon which international research into the origin of life on Earth has been carried out."

The site is private land with no public access.
