= Cave's Inn Pits =

Protected area in Leicestershire, England

Coordinates: 52.41°N 1.21°W

- Site of Special Scientific Interest
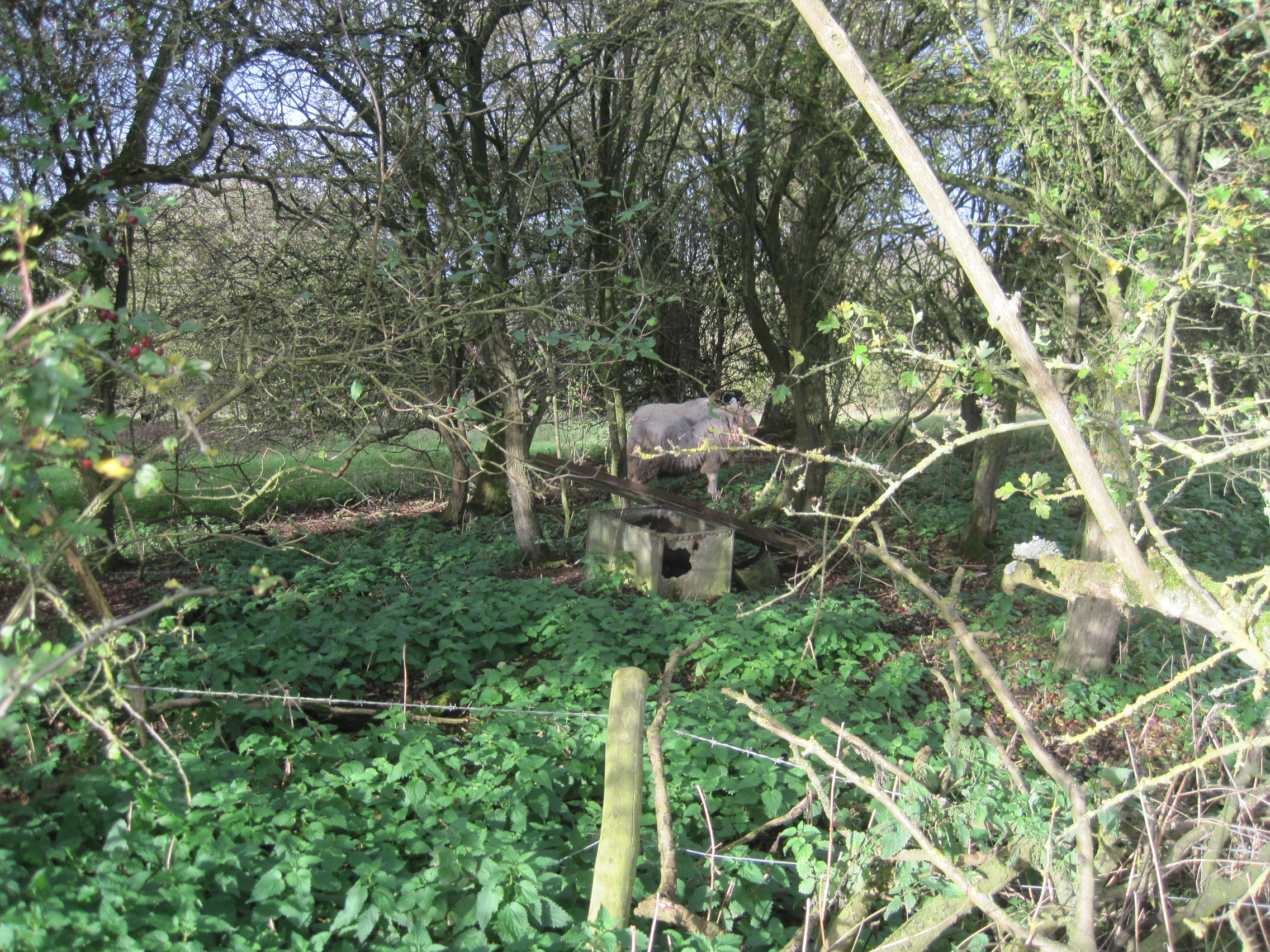
- Location of Cave's Inn Pits.
- Area of search: Leicestershire
- Grid reference: SP 538 795
- Interest: Biological
- Area: 5.8 hectares
- Notification date: 1983
- Location map: Magic Map

Cave's Inn Pits is a 5.8-hectare (14-acre) biological Site of Special Scientific Interest south-west of Shawell in Leicestershire.

These disused gravel workings have some of the best neutral marsh in the county, with varied habitats also including scrub, species-rich grassland and shallow pools. There are diverse species of breeding birds.

The site is private land with no public access.
