= Frisby Marsh =

Protected area in Leicestershire, England

Coordinates: 52.749°N 0.985°W

- Site of Special Scientific Interest
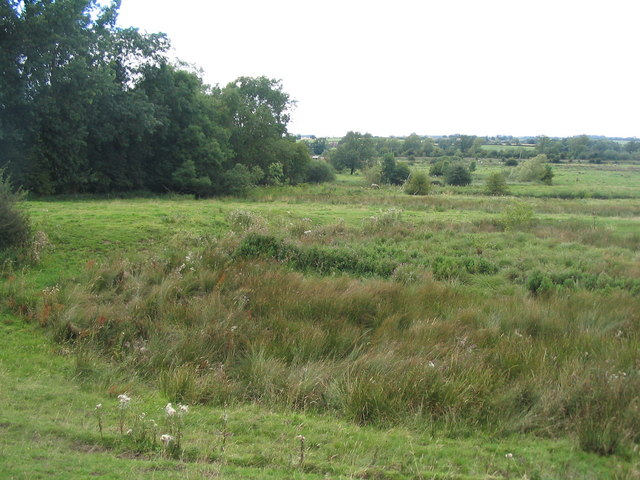
- Location of Frisby Marsh.
- Area of search: Leicestershire
- Grid reference: SK 686 173
- Interest: Biological
- Area: 10.2 hectares
- Notification date: 1983
- Location map: Magic Map

Frisby Marsh is a 10.2-hectare (25-acre) biological Site of Special Scientific Interest east of Frisby on the Wreake in Leicestershire.

This site has spring-fed marshes, grassland, woodland and a pool and channel which are relicts of a former ox-bow lake of the adjacent River Wreake. The marshes have a rich flora, with plants such as marsh valerian and marsh arrowgrass.

A public footpath goes through the southern end of the site.
