= Lockington Marshes =

Coordinates: 52.863°N 1.278°W

- Site of Special Scientific Interest
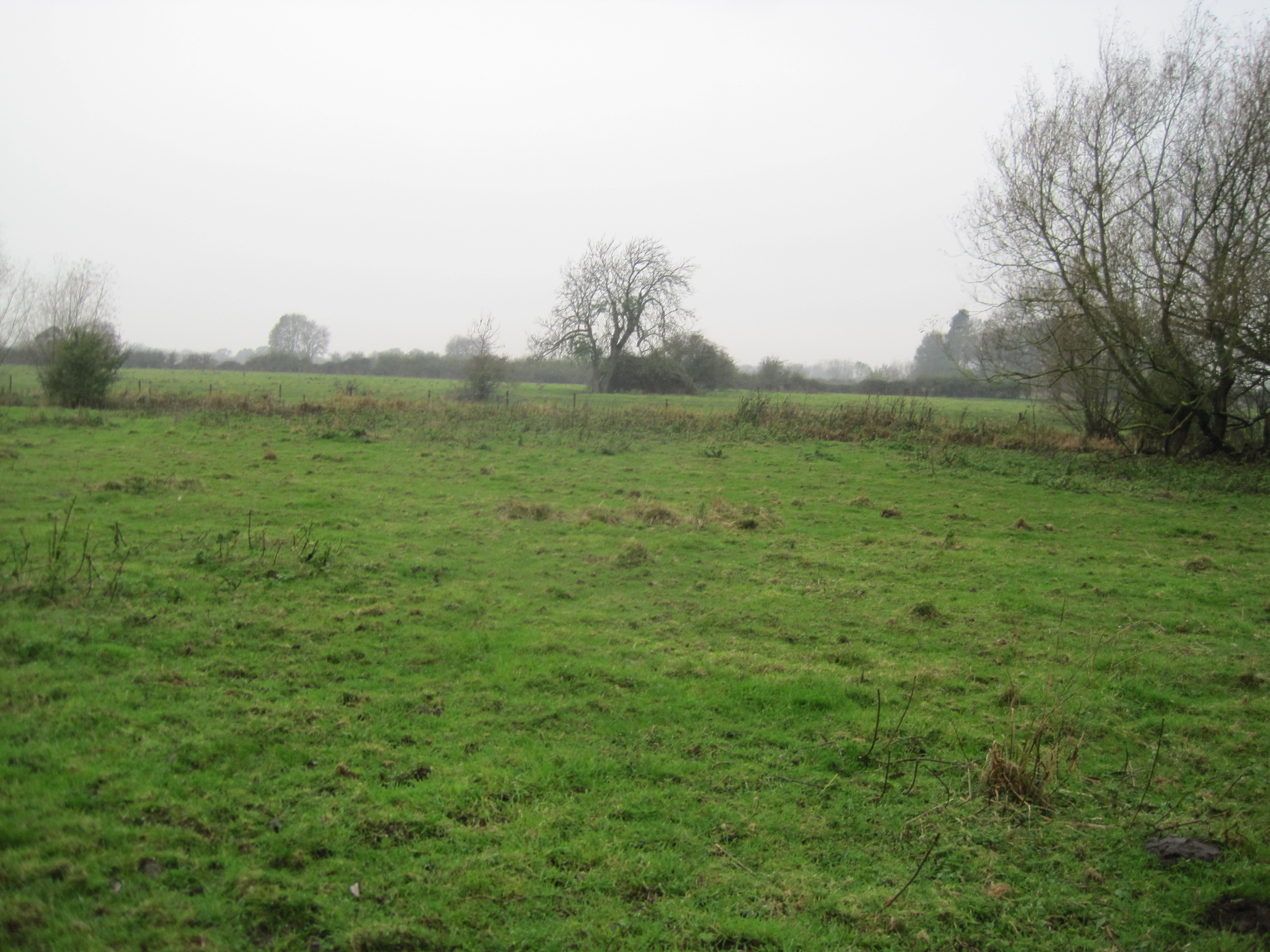
- Location of Lockington Marshes.
- Area of search: Leicestershire
- Grid reference: SK 487 301
- Interest: Biological
- Area: 11.3 hectares
- Notification date: 1983
- Location map: Magic Map

Lockington Marshes is an 11.3-hectare (28-acre) biological Site of Special Scientific Interest north of Ratcliffe on Soar in Leicestershire.

This site in the floodplains of the River Soar and River Trent has a periodically flooded meadow, pools and one of the largest areas of willow carr in the county. The invertebrate fauna includes nationally rare beetles and flies, and scarce species such as the water beetle Batenus livens and the weevil anthribus fasciatus.

The site is private land with no public access.

== See also ==
- River Soar
- River Trent
