= Terrace Hills Pasture =

Protected area in Leicestershire, England

Coordinates: 52.869°N 0.821°W

- Site of Special Scientific Interest
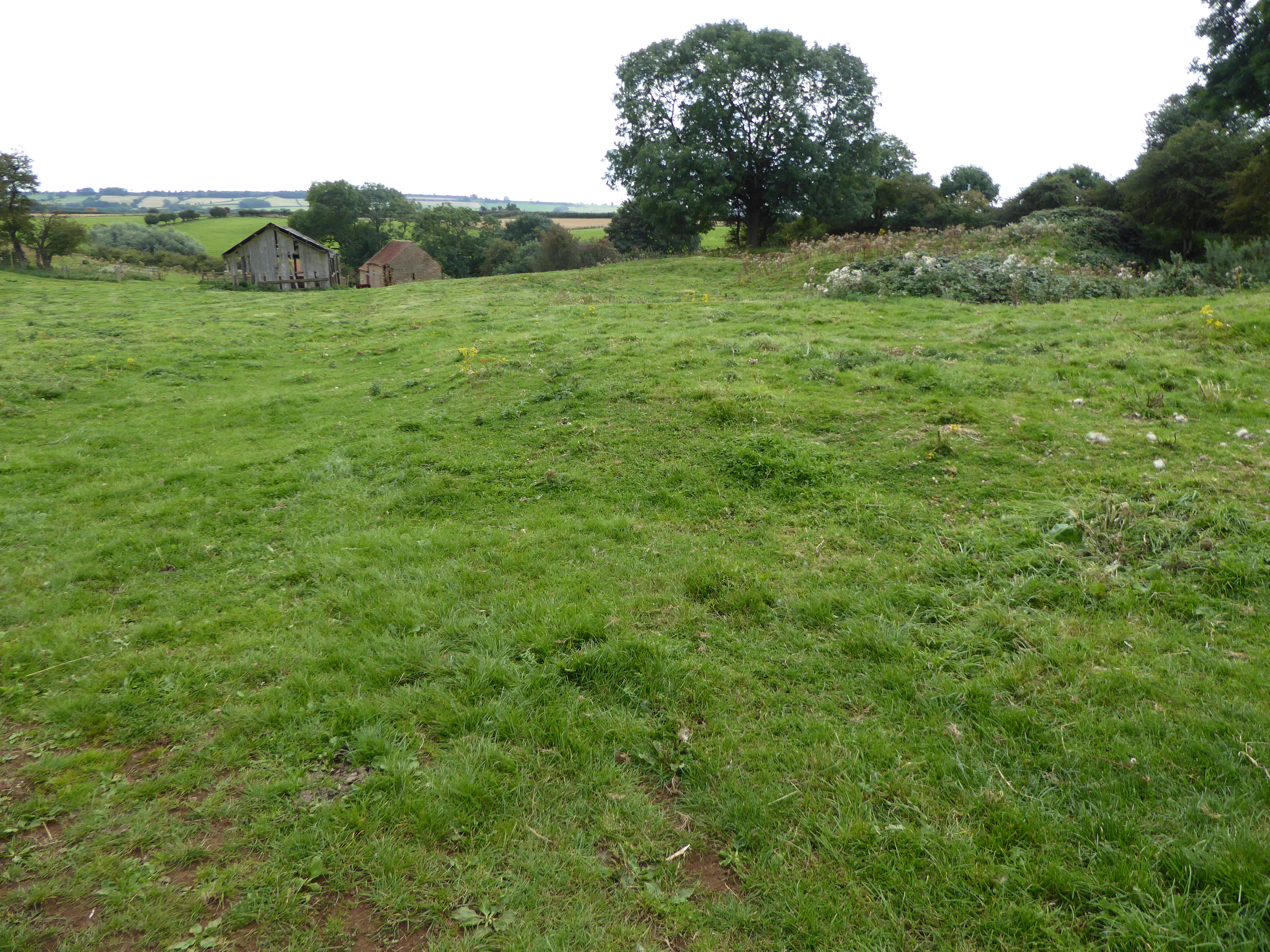
- Location of Terrace Hills Pasture.
- Area of search: Leicestershire
- Grid reference: SK 794 309
- Interest: Biological
- Area: 11.3 hectares
- Notification date: 1983
- Location map: Magic Map

Terrace Hills Pasture is an 11.3-hectare (28-acre) biological Site of Special Scientific Interest north of Eastwell in Leicestershire.

This site has been designated an SSSI as an example of old calcareous pasture, but some areas are former quarries, and as a result there is an undulating terrain. The dominant grasses are crested dog's-tail, sweet vernal grass and red fescue, and there is also a small stream with an area of marsh.

The site is composed of two adjoining fields. There is no public access to the larger western field, but a public footpath goes through the smaller eastern one.
