= Croft and Huncote Quarry =

Coordinates: 52.563°N 1.247°W

- Site of Special Scientific Interest
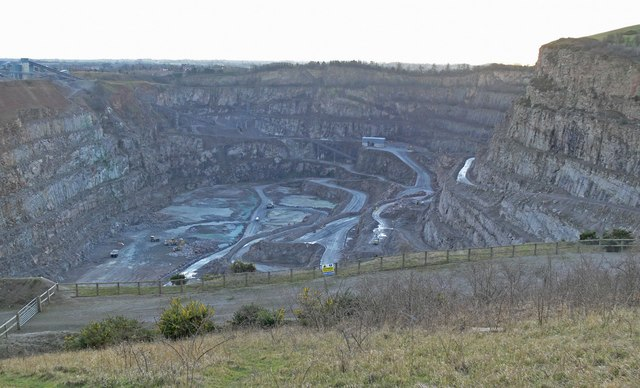
- Location of Croft and Huncote Quarry.
- Area of search: Leicestershire
- Grid reference: SP 511 964
- Interest: Geological
- Area: 35.3 hectares
- Notification date: 1986
- Location map: Magic Map

Croft and Huncote Quarry is a 35.3-hectare (87-acre) geological Site of Special Scientific Interest north of Croft in Leicestershire. It is a Geological Conservation Review site.

This site exposes igneous tonalite rocks 452 million years old, in the Ordivician period, and it helps to document the growth of continental crust beneath central England. This layer is unconformably overlain by Triassic mineralised manganese.

The site is private land with no public access.
