= Pasture and Asplin Woods =

Woodland and pasture area in England

Coordinates: 52.789°N 1.372°W

- Site of Special Scientific Interest
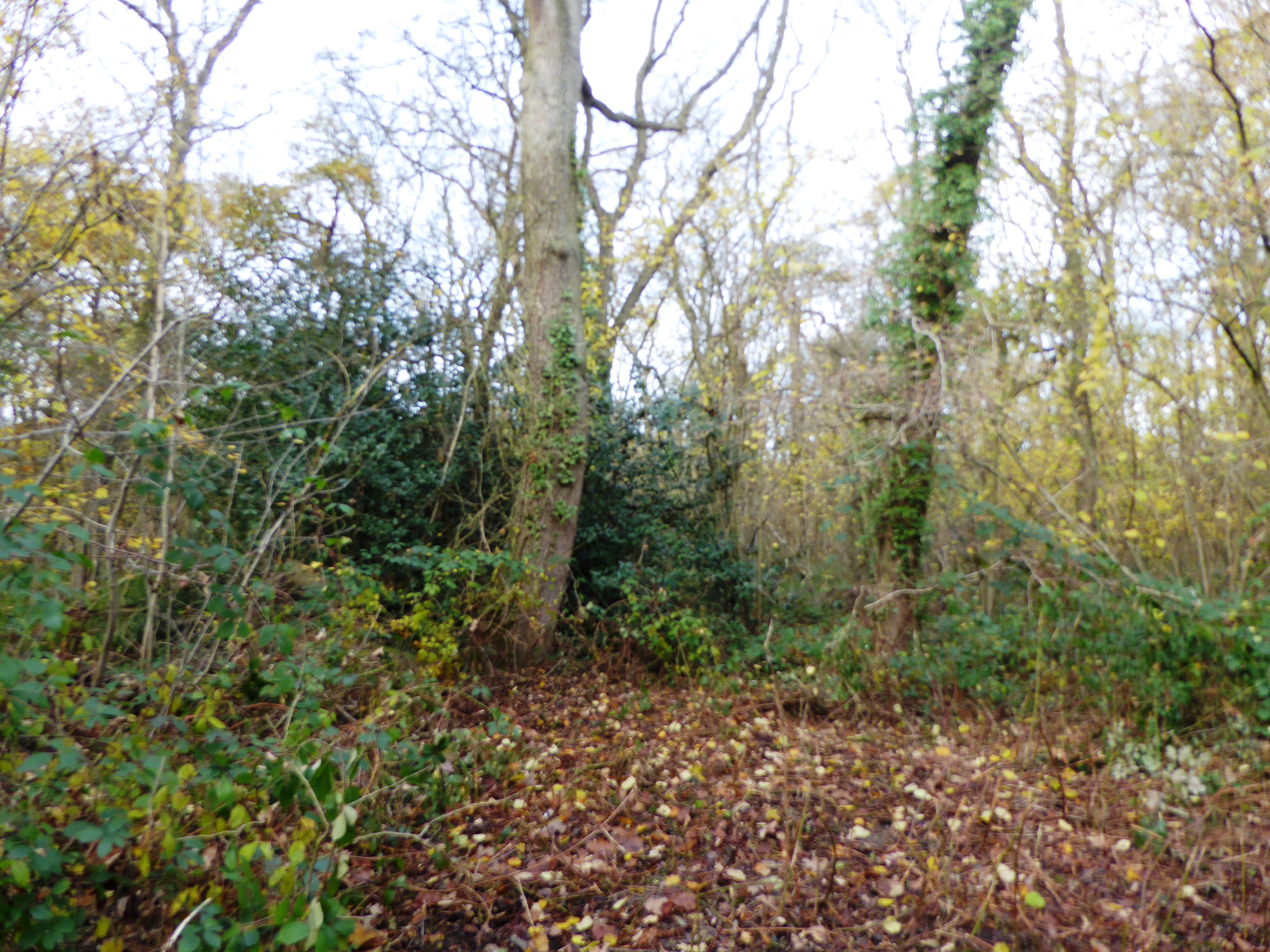
- Pasture Wood
- Location of Pasture and Asplin Woods.
- Area of search: Leicestershire
- Grid reference: SK 426 215
- Interest: Biological
- Area: 40.9 hectares (101 acres)
- Notification date: 1983
- Location map: Magic Map

Pasture and Asplin Woods is a 40.9 hectares (101 acres) biological Site of Special Scientific Interest west of Belton in Leicestershire.

These ancient woods on poorly drained clay soils are dominated by ash, with a shrub layer of hazel and hawthorn. There are herbs characteristic of ancient woodland, such as wood anemone and sweet woodruff.

The site is private property with no public access.
