= Sheepy Fields =

Protected area in Leicestershire, England

Coordinates: 52.619°N 1.511°W

- Site of Special Scientific Interest
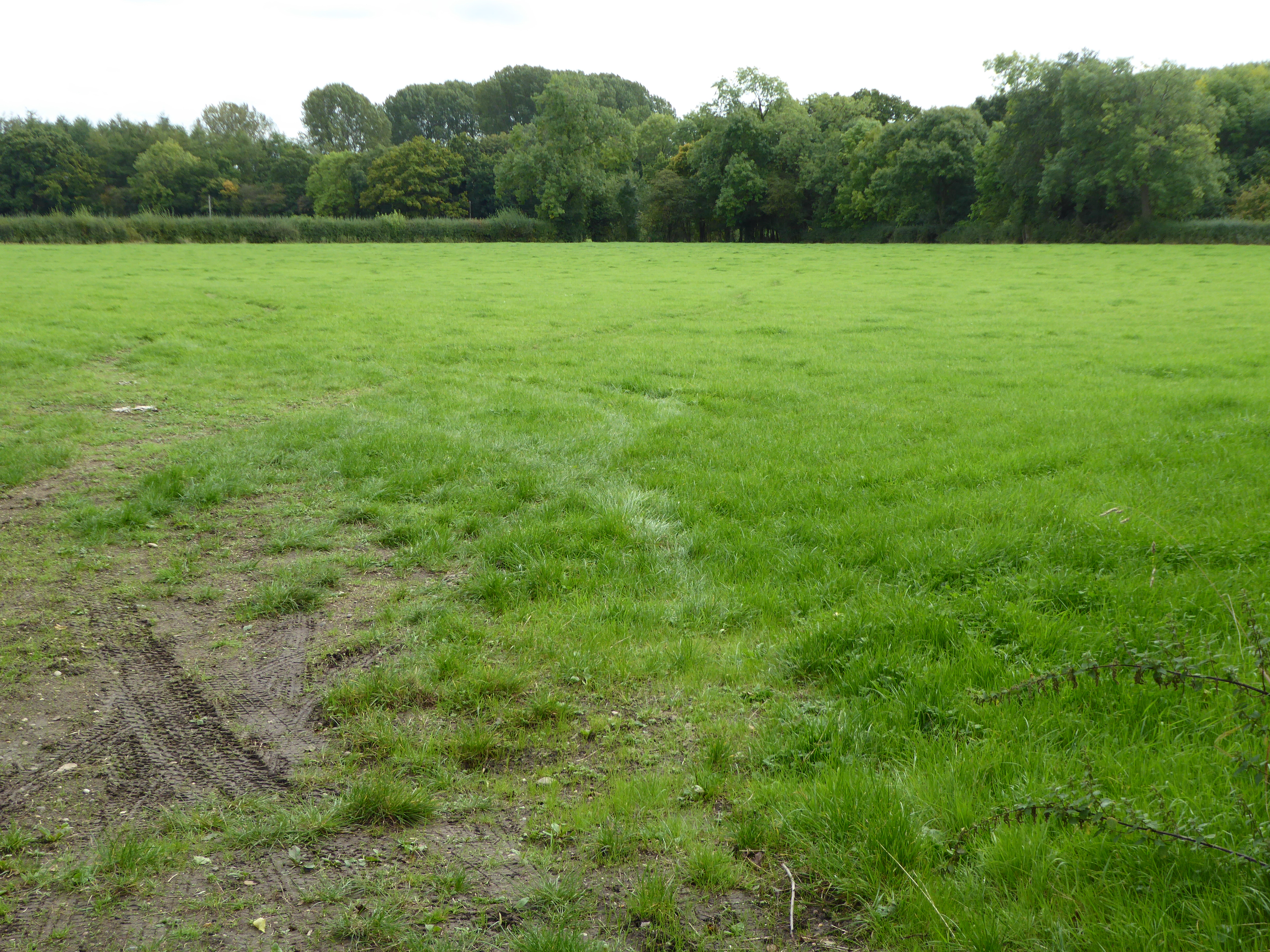
- Location of Sheepy Fields.
- Area of search: Leicestershire
- Grid reference: SK 332 025
- Interest: Biological
- Area: 4.9 hectares
- Notification date: 1983
- Location map: Magic Map

Sheepy Fields is a 4.9-hectare (12-acre) biological Site of Special Scientific Interest north of Sheepy Magna in Leicestershire.

The two hay meadows in this site are on post-glacial river terrace deposits. There are diverse herbs such as lady's mantle, adder's tongue, hayrattle, pepper saxifrage, bulbous buttercup and cowslip.

The site is private land with no public access.
