= Benscliffe Wood =

Scientific Interest area in Leicestershire

Coordinates: 52.709°N 1.242°W

- Site of Special Scientific Interest
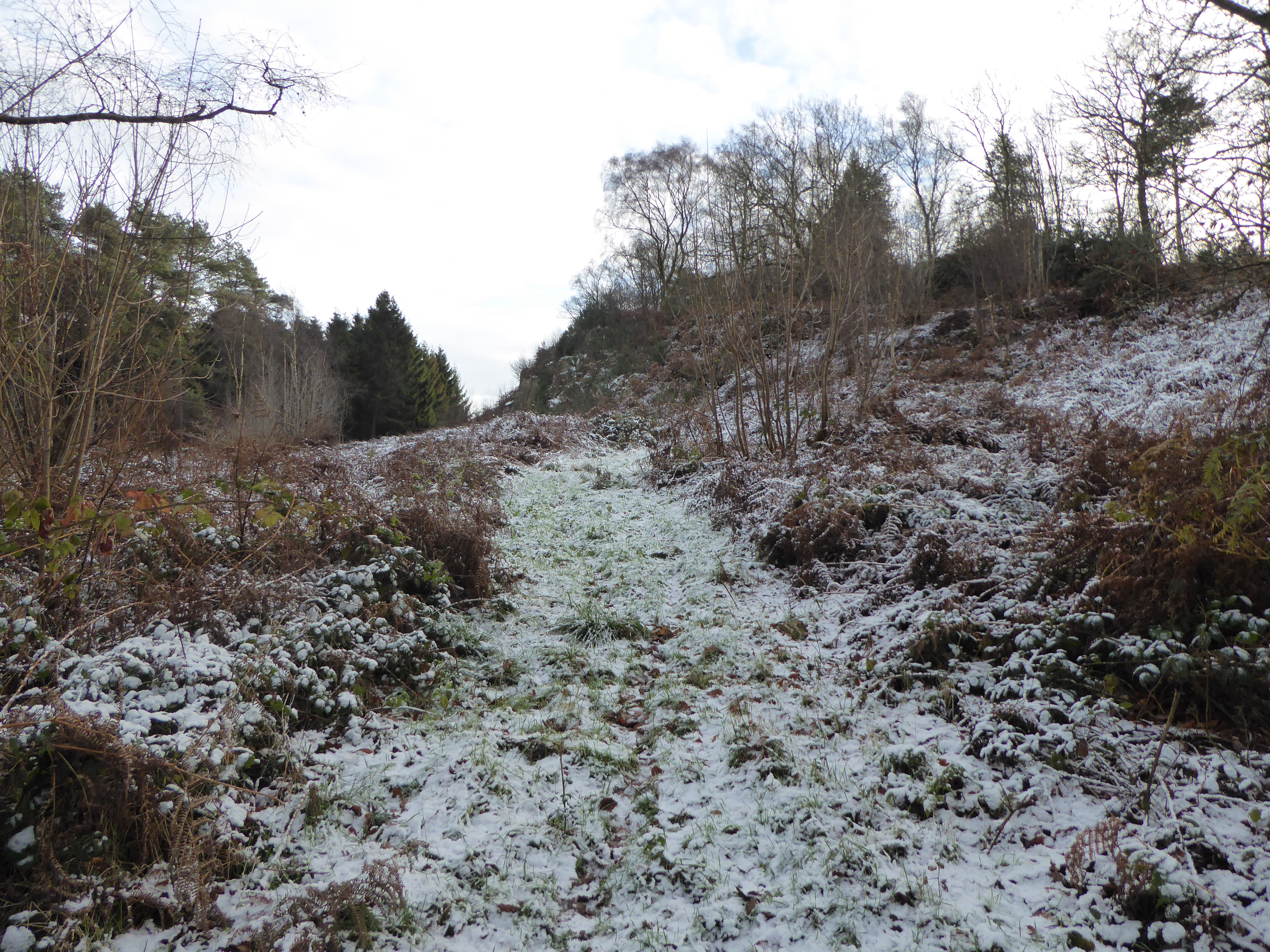
- Location of Benscliffe Wood.
- Area of search: Leicestershire
- Grid reference: SK 513 126
- Interest: Biological
- Area: 9.8 hectares (24 acres)
- Notification date: 1986
- Location map: Magic Map

Benscliffe Wood is a 9.8 hectares (24 acres) biological Site of Special Scientific Interest in Leicestershire.

This wood has one of the richest varieties of lichens in the East Midlands, with over thirty species growing on Precambrian rocks. Eleven of the species are rare in the county.

The site is private land with no public access.
