= Donington Park SSSI =

Protected area in Leicestershire, England

Coordinates: 52.837°N 1.386°W

Donington Park
- Site of Special Scientific Interest
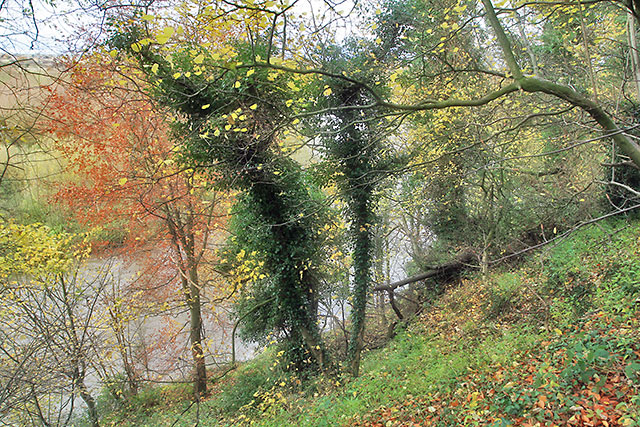
- Location of Donington Park.
- Area of search: Leicestershire
- Grid reference: SK 414 268
- Interest: Biological
- Area: 32.9 hectares
- Notification date: 1983
- Location map: Magic Map

Donington Park is a 32.9-hectare (81-acre) biological Site of Special Scientific Interest west of Castle Donington in Leicestershire. It is separate from the nearby Donington Park motorsport circuit.

The park was mentioned in the Domesday Book, and it has been managed as a deer park for all of its recorded history. Most of it has a short grass sward, with areas of bracken and ancient oaks, which provide a habitat for rare beetles and spiders.

The site is private land with no public access.
