= Breedon Hill =

UK Site of Special Scientific Interest

Coordinates: 52.804°N 1.402°W

- Site of Special Scientific Interest
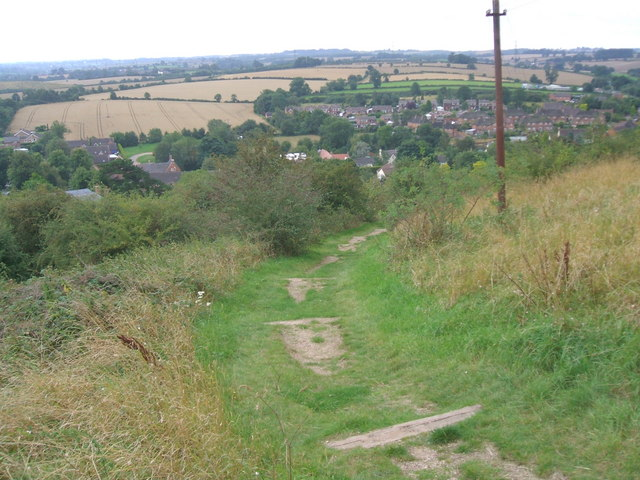
- Location of Breedon Hill.
- Area of search: Leicestershire
- Grid reference: SK 404 232
- Interest: Biological
- Area: 5.3 hectares
- Notification date: 1983
- Location map: Magic Map

Breedon Hill is a 5.3-hectare (13-acre) biological Site of Special Scientific Interest on the northern outskirts of Breedon on the Hill in Leicestershire.

== Geography ==
This is the largest area of species rich carboniferous limestone in the county. Herbs include bulbous buttercup, harebell, burnet saxifrage, musk thistle and hairy violet.

The site is crossed by a footpath from the village to the church.

== Etymology ==
The name Breedon is first attested in Bede's Ecclesiastical History of the English People of 731, in the form Briudun and Breadun. Here the name refers to the settlement now known as Breedon on the Hill, but the settlement evidently took its name from the hill on which it stands, which must once simply have been called Breedon: the first element of the name derives from Brittonic *breɣ ("hill"). This word, whose literal meaning was presumably not understood by Old English-speakers, was borrowed into Old English as a name for the hill, with the addition for clarification of the Old English word dūn (also meaning "hill"). When the word dūn ceased to be understood to mean "hill", and perhaps also to distinguish the hill from the settlement which took its name, the element Hill was added.
