= One Barrow Plantation =

Geological site in England

Coordinates: 52.749°N 1.315°W

- Site of Special Scientific Interest
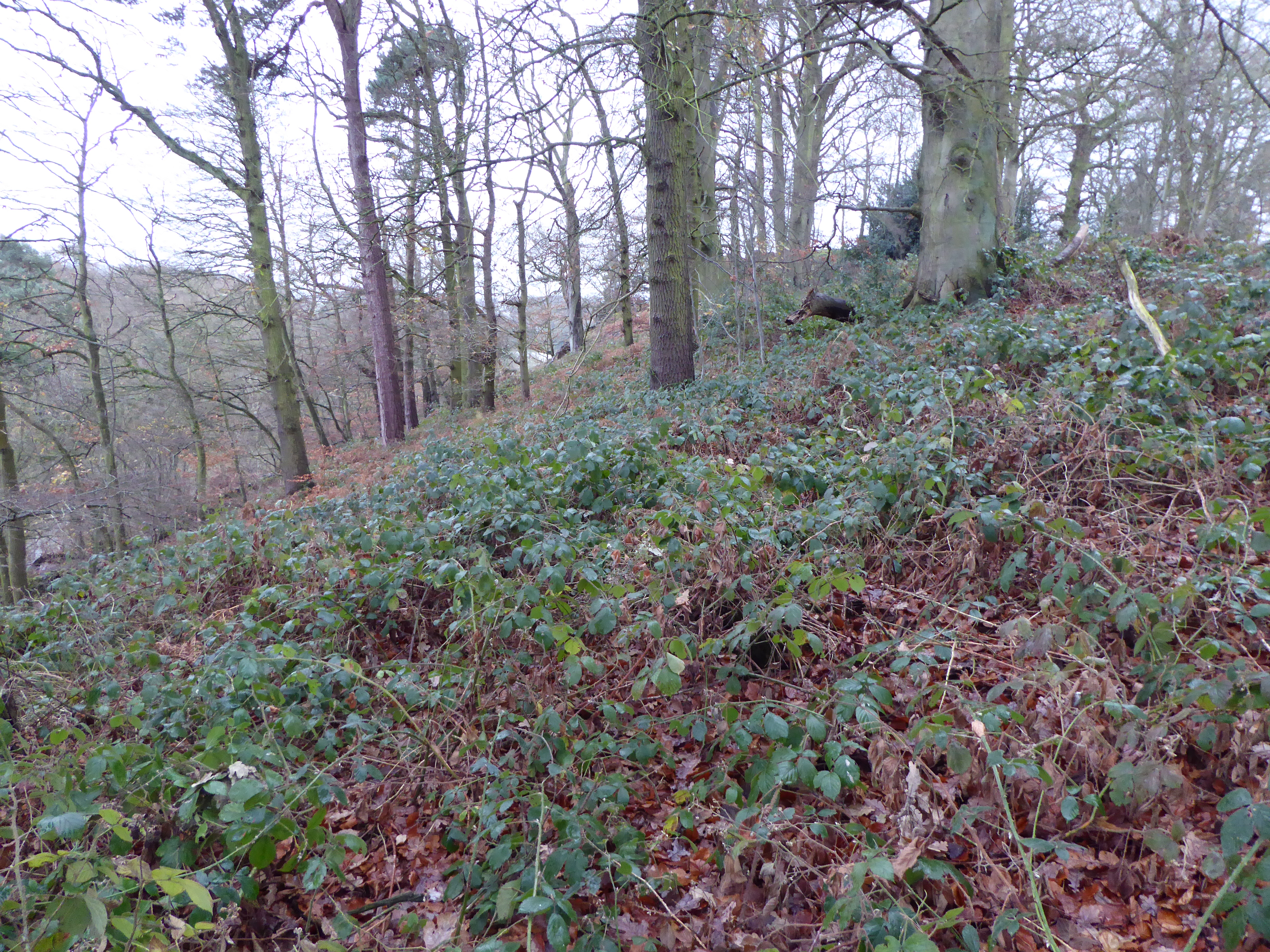
- Location of One Barrow Plantation.
- Area of search: Leicestershire
- Grid reference: SK 463 171
- Interest: Geological
- Area: 1.8 hectares (4.4 acres)
- Notification date: 1992
- Location map: Magic Map

One Barrow Plantation is a 1.8 hectares (4.4 acres) geological Site of Special Scientific Interest (SSSI) south-west of Shepshed in Leicestershire. It is a Geological Conservation Review site. Part of the site is in the Blackbrook Reservoir biological SSSI.

This site exposes rocks dating to the late Precambrian, around 600 million years ago. The deposits are mainly volcanic ash, thought to have been deposited in the sea from volcanoes on neighbouring islands similar to those now found on the western edge of the Pacific Ocean.

The site is private land with no public access. No geology is visible.
