= Holwell Mouth =

Protected area in Leicestershire, England

Coordinates: 52.813°N 0.927°W

- Site of Special Scientific Interest
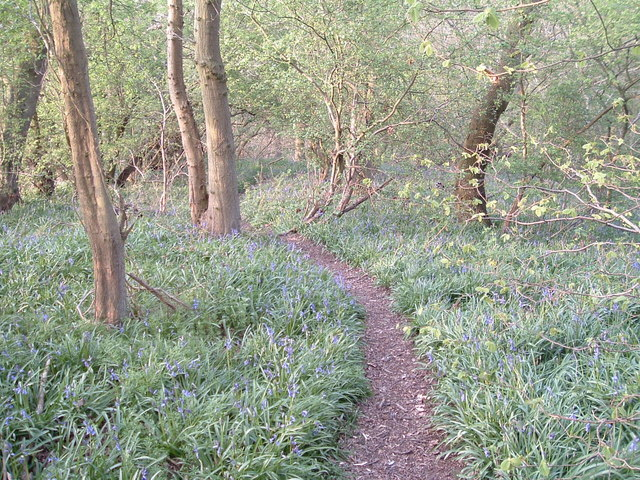
- Location of Holwell Mouth.
- Area of search: Leicestershire
- Grid reference: SK 725 245
- Interest: Biological
- Area: 14.5 hectares
- Notification date: 1983
- Location map: Magic Map

Holwell Mouth is a 14.5-hectare (36-acre) biological Site of Special Scientific Interest south-east of Nether Broughton in Leicestershire. It is common land.

This marsh on Jurassic clay is in the valley of the River Smite, which runs through the site. There are also areas of grassland, bracken and woodland, and the diverse habitats support a range of birds and insects.

There is public access to the site.
