= Holly Rock Fields =

Protected area in Leicestershire, England

Coordinates: 52.725°N 1.319°W

- Site of Special Scientific Interest
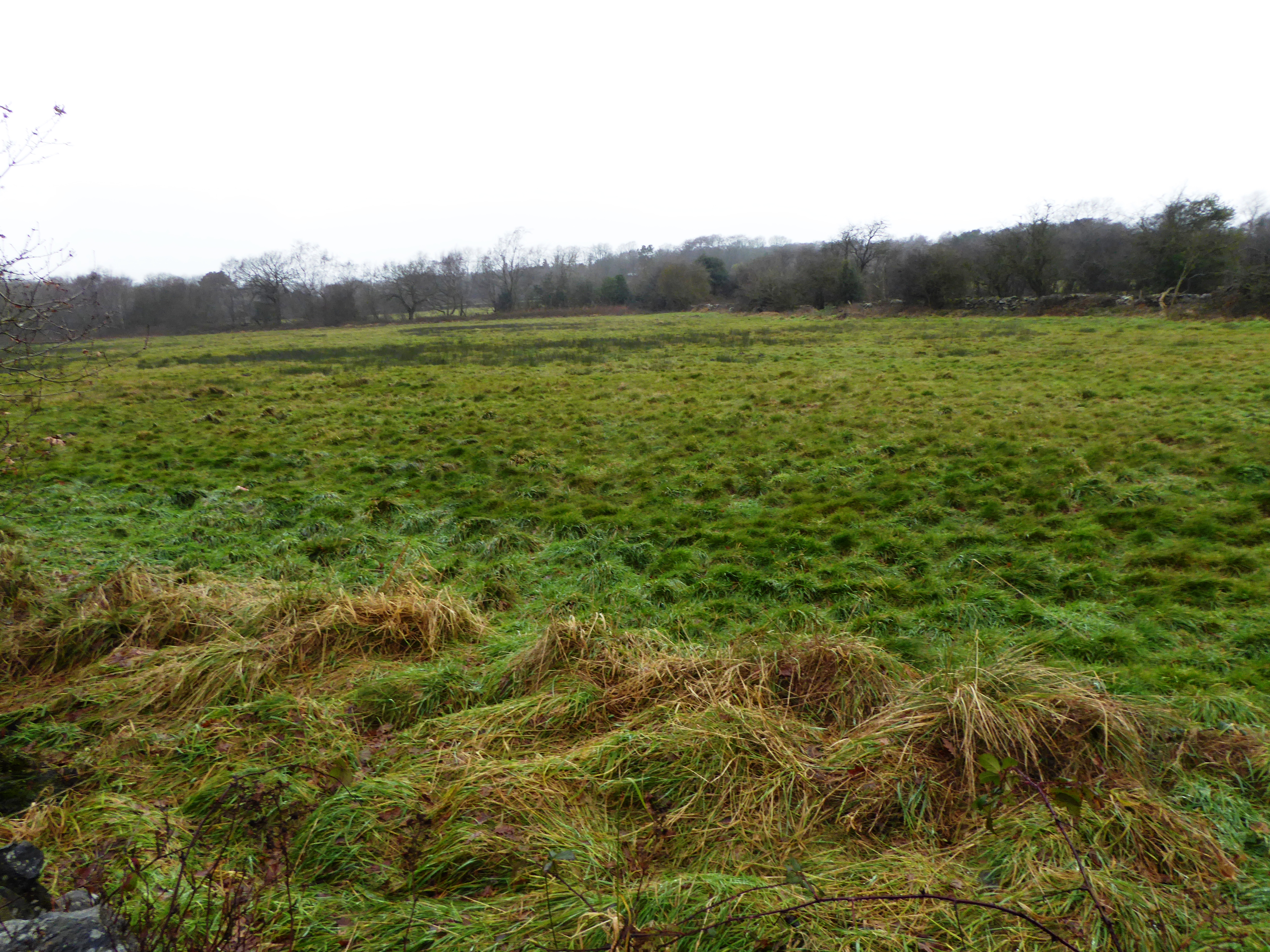
- Location of Holly Rock Fields.
- Area of search: Leicestershire
- Grid reference: SK 461 144
- Interest: Biological
- Area: 3.9 hectares (9.6 acres)
- Notification date: 2013
- Location map: Magic Map

Holly Rock Fields is a 3.9 hectares (9.6 acres) biological Site of Special Scientific Interest east of Coalville in Leicestershire.

This is a nationally important site as it is primarily the nationally scarce National Vegetation Classification type MG5, crested dog’s-tail and common knapweed grassland. The fields have not been subject to agricultural intensification, and they are floristically diverse.

The site is private land with no public access.
