= Debdale Meadow, Muston =

Protected area in Leicestershire, England

Coordinates: 52.9453°N 0.7587°W

- Site of Special Scientific Interest
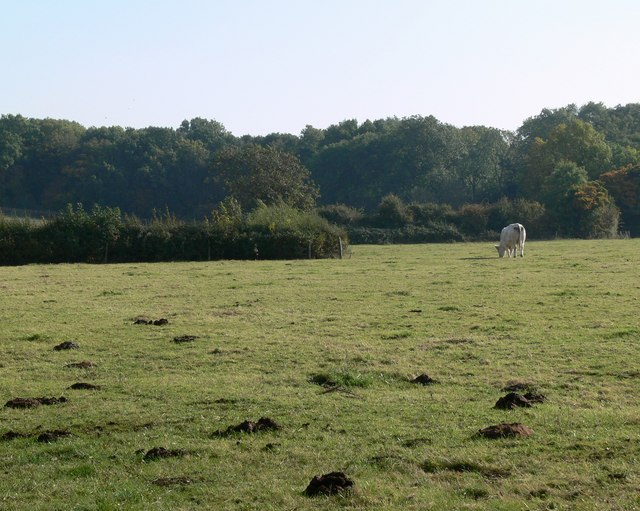
- Location of Debdale Meadow, Muston.
- Area of search: Leicestershire
- Grid reference: SK 835 393
- Interest: Biological
- Area: 4.3 hectares
- Notification date: 1987
- Location map: Magic Map

Debdale Meadow, Muston is a 4.3-hectare (11-acre) biological Site of Special Scientific Interest north of Muston in Leicestershire.

This traditionally managed meadow has diverse flora typical of the clay soils of the Midlands, and it has evidence of medieval ridge and furrow cultivation. Flora include cowslip, bulbous buttercup and pepper-saxifrage.

The site is private land with no public access.
