= Oakley Wood =

Site of Special Scientific Interest

Coordinates: 52.789°N 1.282°W

- Site of Special Scientific Interest
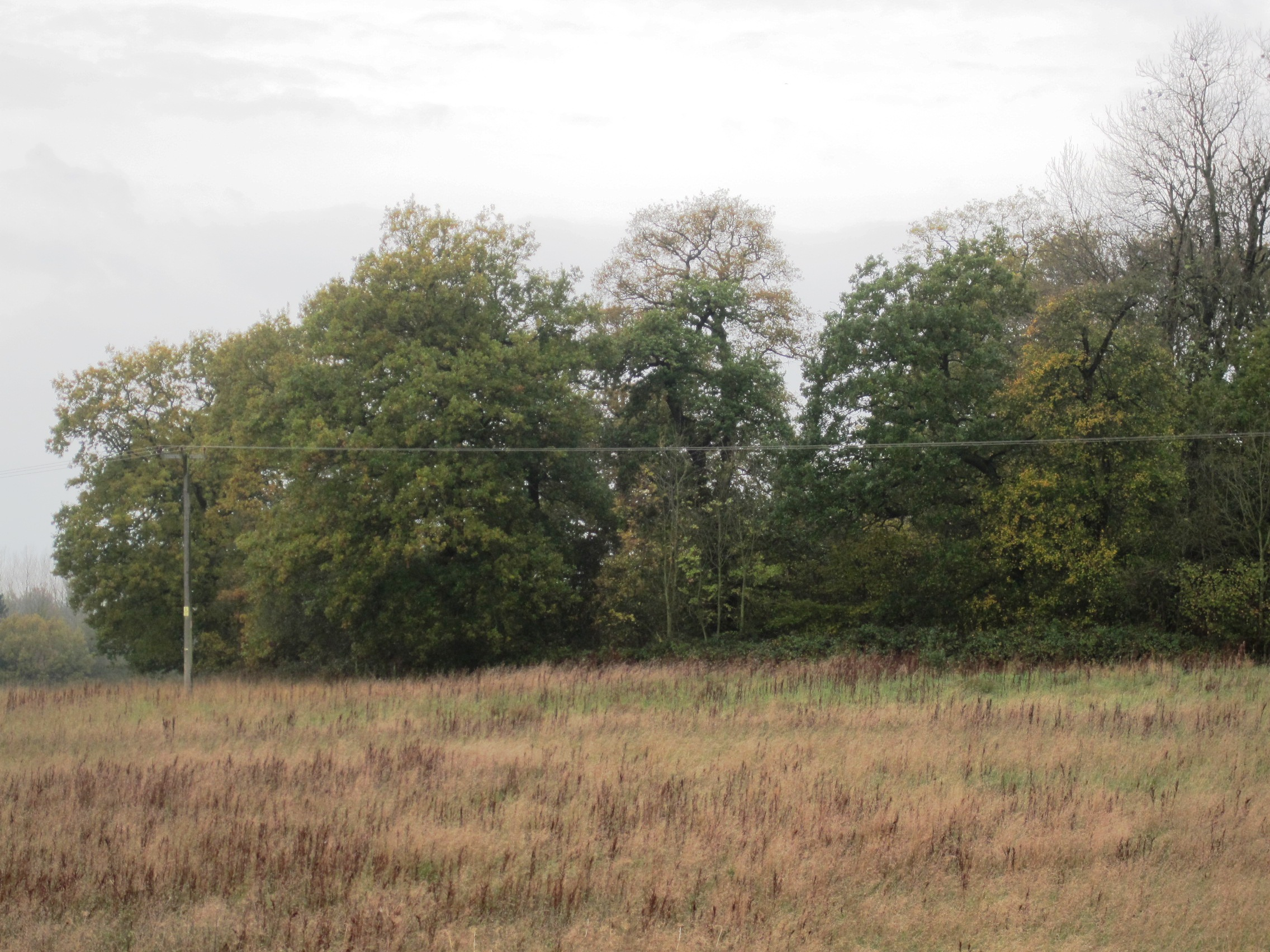
- Location of Oakley Wood.
- Area of search: Leicestershire
- Grid reference: SK 484 216
- Interest: Biological
- Area: 48.1 hectares
- Notification date: 1985
- Location map: Magic Map

Oakley Wood is a 48.1-hectare (119-acre) biological Site of Special Scientific Interest west of Hathern in Leicestershire.

This site provides the only example in the county of the transition from oak woodland on free draining acid soil to the ash and hazel typical of the heavy clays of eastern central England. Rides add to the variety of flora, with woodland species such as lily of the valley and yellow archangel.

The site is private land with no public access.
