= Newhurst Quarry =

British geological site

Coordinates: 52.756°N 1.282°W

- Site of Special Scientific Interest
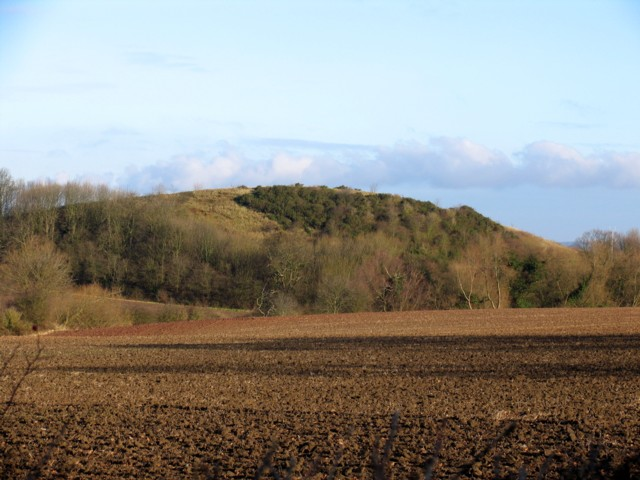
- Location of Newhurst Quarry.
- Area of search: Leicestershire
- Grid reference: SK 485 179
- Interest: Geological
- Area: 9.5 hectares (23 acres)
- Notification date: 1984
- Location map: Magic Map

Newhurst Quarry is a 9.5 hectares (23 acres) geological Site of Special Scientific Interest on the southern outskirts of Shepshed in Leicestershire. It is a Geological Conservation Review site.

This is the only British site where hypogene mineralisation, deep in the earth, has been weathered during the Triassic, around 225 million years ago. It is also the only British site to have the minerals coulsonite and vesignieite.

The site is private land with no public access.
