= Shepshed Cutting =

Protected area in Leicestershire, England

Coordinates: 52.762°N 1.319°W

- Site of Special Scientific Interest
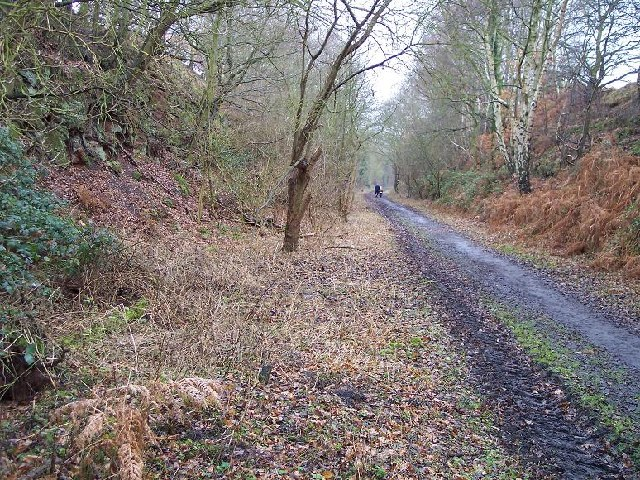
- Location of Shepshed Cutting.
- Area of search: Leicestershire
- Grid reference: SK 461 185
- Interest: Geological
- Area: 6.0 hectares (15 acres)
- Notification date: 1985
- Location map: Magic Map

Shepshed Cutting is a 6.0 hectares (15 acres) geological Site of Special Scientific Interest west of Shepshed in Leicestershire.

The Triassic deposits in Shepshed Cutting are unique, with a flat sheet of galena resting on red clay, and the whole enclosed in sandstone. The site is described by Natural England as "of international importance for developing a better understanding of the origins of mineral deposits and the processes which form them".

A public footpath runs through the site.
