= Harby Hill Wood =

Forest in Leicestershire, England

Coordinates: 52.848°N 0.869°W

- Site of Special Scientific Interest
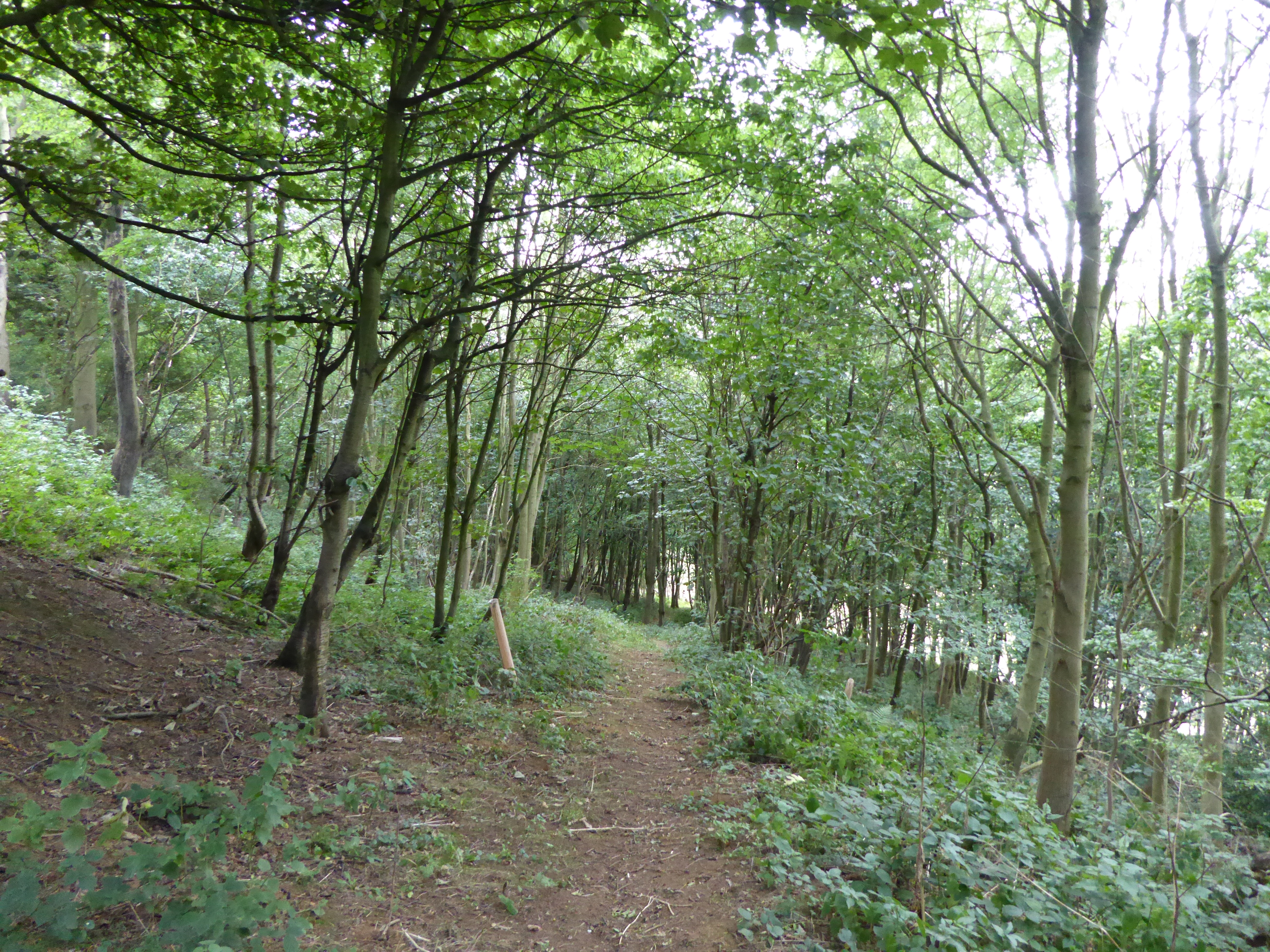
- Location of Harby Hill Wood.
- Area of search: Leicestershire
- Grid reference: SK 761 282
- Interest: Biological
- Area: 16.9 hectares
- Notification date: 1983
- Location map: Magic Map

Harby Hill Wood is a 16.9-hectare (42-acre) biological Site of Special Scientific Interest west of Eastwell in Leicestershire.

This site has steeply sloping ash and sycamore woodland, with areas of spring-fed marsh and colonies of wild daffodils. There is also an area of species-rich dry grassland, which has flora such as pignut and musk thistle.

The site is private land but it is crossed by public footpaths.
