= Cliffe Hill Quarry =

Geological site in Leicestershire, England

Coordinates: 52.691°N 1.3°W

- Site of Special Scientific Interest
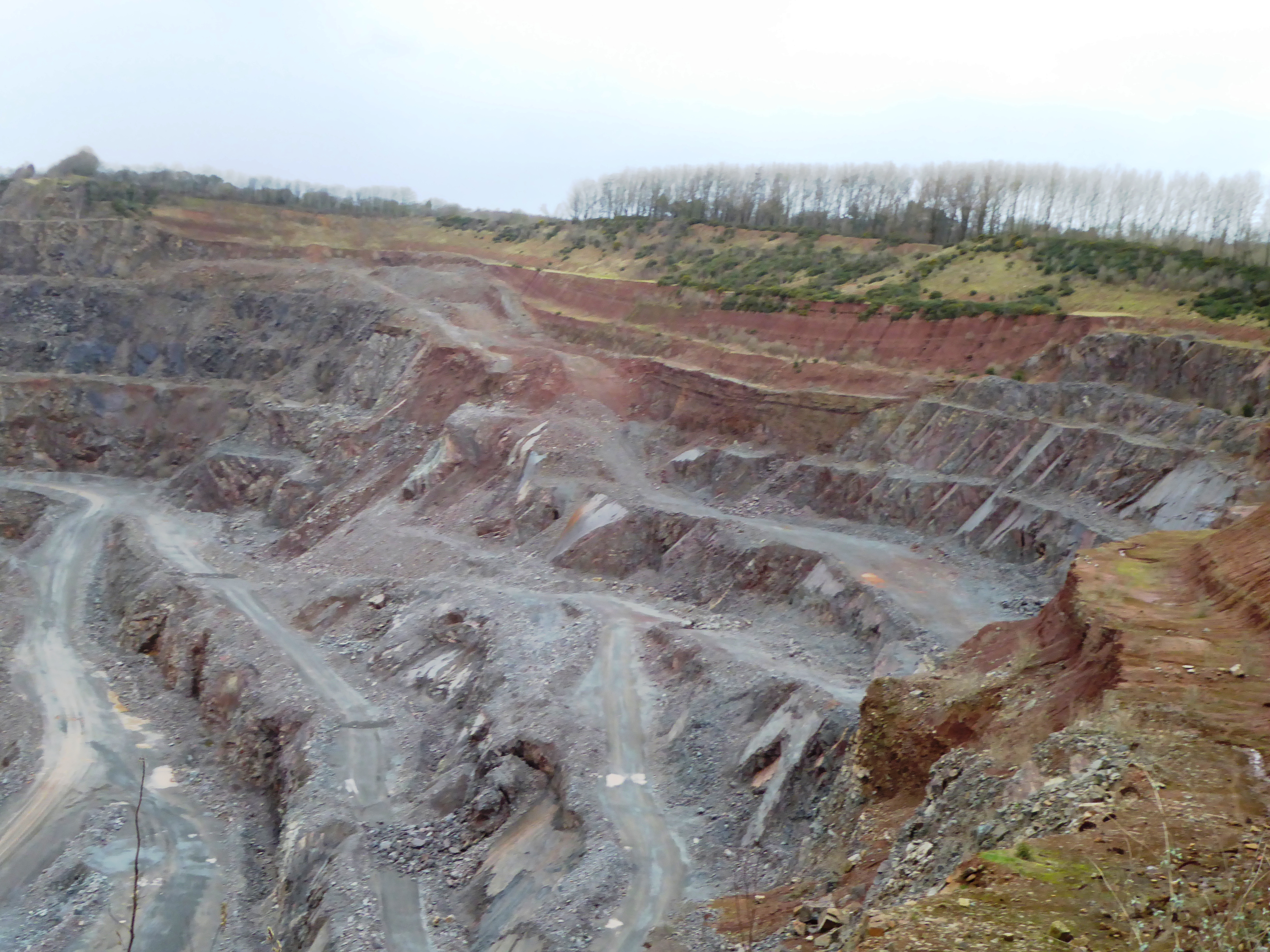
- Location of Cliffe Hill Quarry.
- Area of search: Leicestershire
- Grid reference: SK 474 107
- Interest: Geological
- Area: 19.2 hectares (47 acres)
- Notification date: 1990
- Location map: Magic Map

Cliffe Hill Quarry is a 19.2 hectares (47 acres) geological Site of Special Scientific Interest on the western outskirts of Markfield in Leicestershire. It is a Geological Conservation Review site.

This quarry exposes volcanic and sedimentary Charnian rocks dating to the Ediacaran period (635 to 541 Ma) of the Proterozoic eon. It was probably then a volcanic island. An unusually homogeneous form of the rock diorite found here is sometimes called markfieldite, named after the village.

The site is private land with no public access.
