= Atheta basicornis =

Scientific classification
- Domain: Eukaryota
- Kingdom: Animalia
- Phylum: Arthropoda
- Class: Insecta
- Order: Coleoptera
- Suborder: Polyphaga
- Infraorder: Staphyliniformia
- Family: Staphylinidae
- Genus: Atheta
- Species: A. basicornis

Binomial name
- Atheta basicornis (Mulsant & Rey, 1851)

Species of beetle

Atheta basicornis is a species of beetle belonging to the family Staphylinidae.

It is native to Europe.
