= Lount Meadows =

Protected area in Leicestershire, England

Coordinates: 52.768°N 1.429°W

- Site of Special Scientific Interest
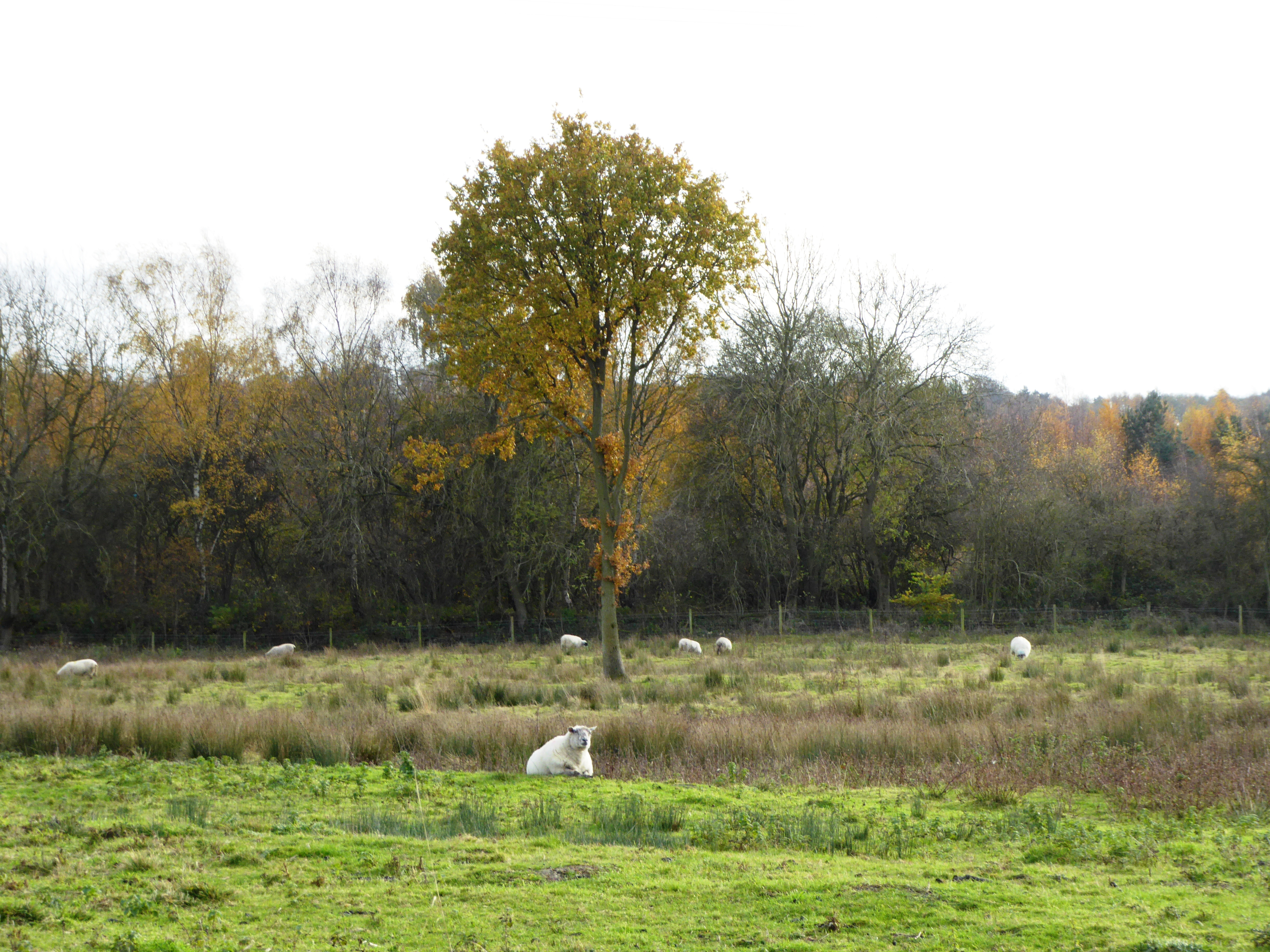
- Location of Lount Meadows.
- Area of search: Leicestershire
- Grid reference: SK 385 190
- Interest: Biological
- Area: 8.5 hectares (21 acres)
- Notification date: 1983
- Location map: Magic Map

Lount Meadows is a 8.5 hectares (21 acres) biological Site of Special Scientific Interest south of Lount in Leicestershire, England.

This slightly acidic grassland site has hay meadows with diverse grass species. There are also areas of species-rich rough pasture, scrub and marsh, which is dominated by plicate sweet-grass and water horsetail.

The site is private land with no public access.
