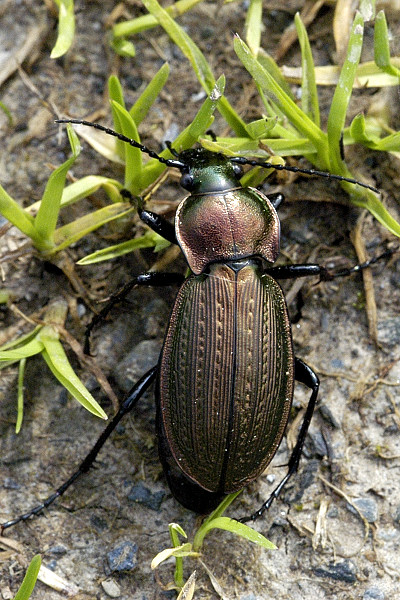

Scientific classification
- Domain: Eukaryota
- Kingdom: Animalia
- Phylum: Arthropoda
- Class: Insecta
- Order: Coleoptera
- Suborder: Adephaga
- Family: Carabidae
- Genus: Carabus
- Species: C. monilis

Binomial name
- Carabus monilis Fabricius, 1792

= Carabus monilis =

Species of beetle

Carabus monilis, the necklace ground beetle, is a species of beetle endemic to Europe, where it is observed in Austria, Belgium, mainland France, Germany, Great Britain including the Isle of Man, the Republic of Ireland, mainland Italy, Liechtenstein, Luxembourg, mainland Norway, mainland Spain, Switzerland, and the Netherlands.

== Gallery ==
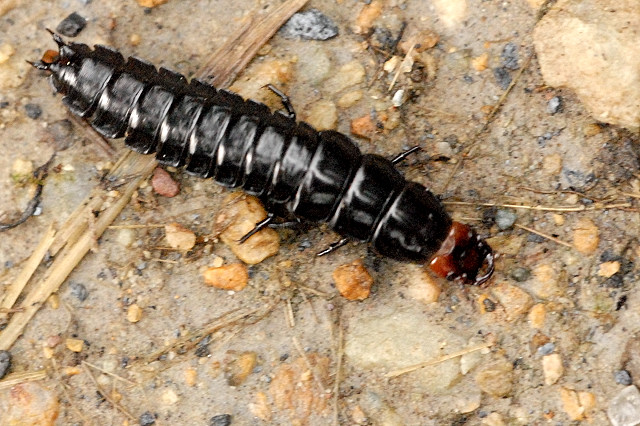
Larva

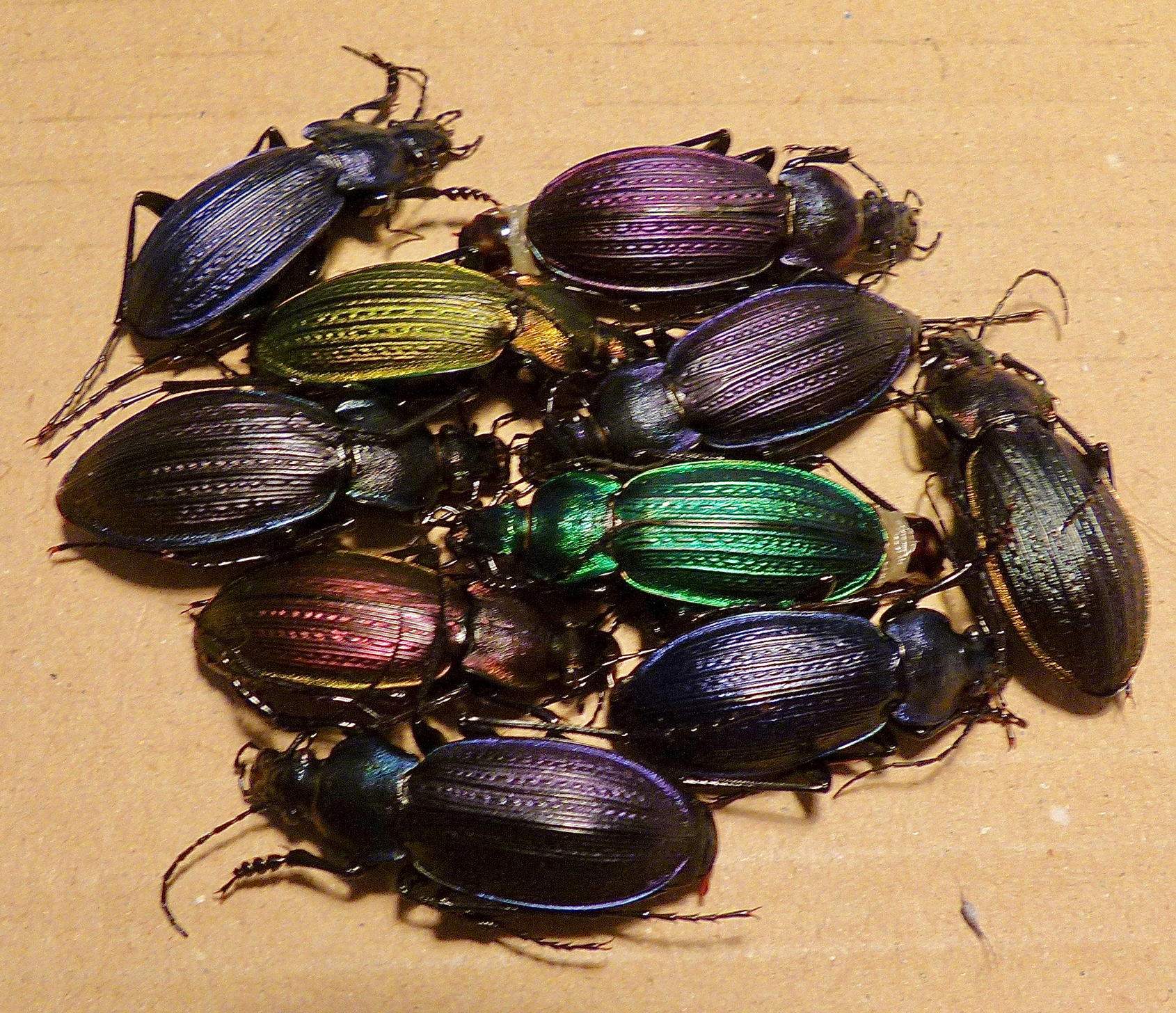
Showing colour variation. In France.
