= Leicestershire and Rutland Wildlife Trust =

English conservation charity

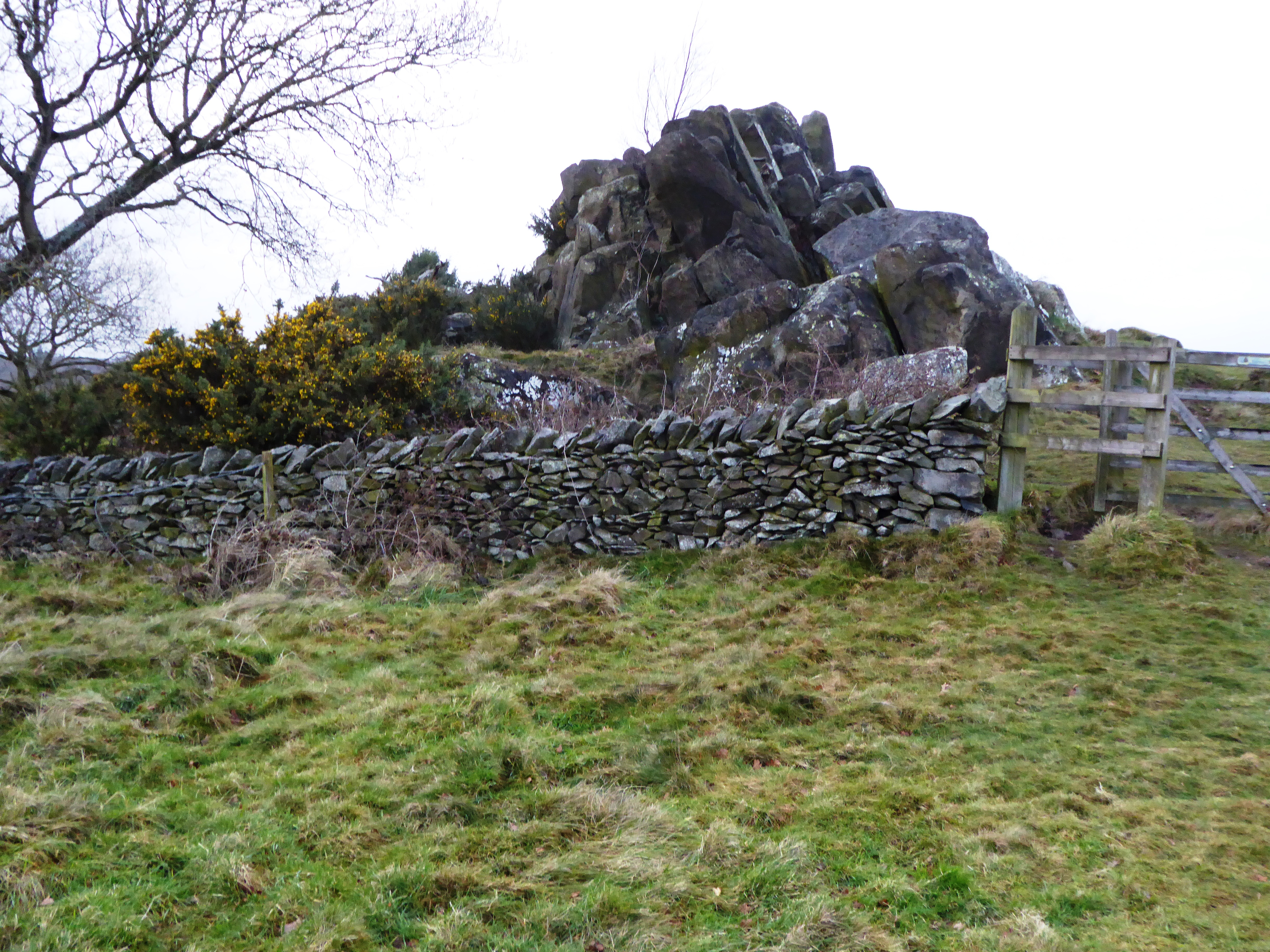
Drystone wall and rocky outcrop in Altar Stones

The Leicestershire and Rutland Wildlife Trust (LRWT) is one of 46 wildlife trusts across the United Kingdom. It manages nature reserves in Leicestershire and Rutland, and was founded in 1956 as the Leicestershire and Rutland Trust for Nature Conservation. As of January 2018, it has over 16,000 members, (Note: Members receive a reserves guide, a magazine three times a year and a discount on an annual permit to Rutland Water.) a staff of about 25 and more than 500 volunteers. It is based in Leicester, and is managed by a Council of Trustees which is elected by the members. It is a charity which covers all aspects of nature conservation, and works to protect wild places and wildlife.

Leicestershire has an area of 833 square miles (2,160 km^{2}), and a population according to the 2011 census of 980,000. Leicester City Council is a unitary authority, and the rest of the county is administered by Leicestershire County Council at the top level, with seven district councils in the second tier, Blaby, Charnwood, Harborough, Hinckley and Bosworth, Melton, North West Leicestershire and Oadby and Wigston. Rutland is mainly rural, but has two market towns, Oakham, the county town, and Uppingham. The county has an area of 151.5 square miles (392 square kilometres), and the 2011 census showed a population of 37,400.

LRWT manages thirty-three reserves covering almost 1,200 hectares (3,000 acres). Nineteen are designated Sites of Special Scientific Interest, two are national nature reserves, one is a Ramsar internationally important wetland site, one is a Special Protection Area under the European Union Directive on the Conservation of Wild Birds, two are Nature Conservation Review sites, three contain Geological Conservation Review sites, one contains a scheduled monument, one is a local nature reserve and two are owned by the National Trust. The largest is Rutland Water at 393 hectares (970 acres), a major wetland area which is one of the richest reservoirs for wintering wildfowl in the country. The smallest is Bloody Oaks Quarry at 1.3 hectares (3.2 acres), which has species-rich grassland on Jurassic limestone.

== Sites ==
=== Public access ===
- PP = public access to part of site
- YES = public access to the whole or most of the site

=== Other classifications ===
- GCR = Geological Conservation Review
- LNR = Local nature reserve
- NCR = Nature Conservation Review
- NNR = National nature reserve
- NT = National Trust
- Ramsar = Ramsar site, an internationally important wetland site
- SM = Scheduled monument
- SPA = Special Protection Area under the European Union Directive on the Conservation of Wild Birds
- SSSI = Site of Special Scientific Interest

Site	Photograph	Area (Note: The area and location are taken from the Wildlife Trust page for each site.)	Location	Public access	Classifications	Description
Altar Stones	Altar Stones	3.7 hectares (9.1 acres)	Leicester; 52.692°N 1.284°W; SK 485107	YES		This site has outcrops of Precambrian volcanic rocks, which have uncommon lichens growing on them. The main habitat is heath grassland, and there are the remains of drystone walls and an old mill.
Bloody Oaks Quarry	Bloody Oaks Quarry	1.3 hectares (3.2 acres)	Stamford; 52.686°N 0.566°W; SK 970108	YES	SSSI	This site has species-rich grassland on Jurassic limestone. The dominant grasses are tor-grass and upright brome and flora include rock-rose, salad burnet, yellow-wort and autumn gentian.
Charley Woods	Charley Woods	26.8 hectares (66 acres)	Loughborough; 52.729°N 1.297°W; SK 476148	YES		These ancient woods are dominated by pedunculate oak, with sparse ground flora. There is a considerable amount of dead wood, which attracts a variety of birds, including all three native species of woodpecker.
Charnwood Lodge	Charnwood Lodge	193.5 hectares (478 acres)	Coalville; 52.735°N 1.323°W; SK 458155	PP	GCR, NNR, SSSI	This is the largest area of moorland in the East Midlands, and it is mainly covered by bracken on dry hills, while wet heath is dominated by purple moor-grass. The site is geologically important for the 'bomb' rocks, volcanic blocks dating the Ediacaran period around 600 million years ago.
Cloud Wood	Cloud Wood	33 hectares (82 acres)	Loughborough; 52.789°N 1.383°W; SK 417214	PP	SSSI	Cloud Wood is an ancient semi-natural wood on clay. The dominant trees are ash and pedunculate oak, and ground flora is very diverse, including pendulous sedge, yellow archangel and giant bellflower.
Cossington Meadows	Cossington Meadows	88.9 hectares (220 acres)	Leicester; 52.711°N 1.118°W; SK 597130	YES		Flora on this wetland site include flowering rush, purple loosestrife and blue water-speedwell. There are several pools which attract wildfowl, such as gadwall and tufted duck, which breed on the site.
Cribb's Meadow	Cribb's Meadow	5 hectares (12 acres)	Grantham; 52.759°N 0.669°W; SK 899188	YES	NCR, NNR, SSSI	The embankment of a disused railway runs through this ridge and furrow neutral meadow on boulder clay. The diverse flora includes adder's tongue fern, pepper saxifrage, hayrattle and green-winged orchid.
Croft Pasture	Croft Pasture	5.8 hectares (14 acres)	Leicester; 52.588°N 1.251°W; SP 509958	YES	SSSI	The River Soar runs through this unimproved grazed meadow, which is dominated by common bent and crested dog's-tail. A knoll in the north of the site has uncommon flora such as meadow saxifrage, common stork's-bill and subterranean clover.
Dimminsdale	Dimminsdale	23.5 hectares (58 acres)	Coalville; 52.793°N 1.444°W; SK 376219 (Note: Dimminsdale is partly in Derbyshire.)	PP	GCR, SSSI	Dimminsdale has semi-natural woodland and one of the largest areas of unimproved acidic grassland in the county. Earl Ferrers' lead mine, which is located on the site, has a unique and complex mixture of minerals such as galena and zinc blende.
Great Merrible Wood	Great Merrible Wood	12 hectares (30 acres)	Uppingham; 52.557°N 0.771°W; SP 834962	YES	SSSI	This is a surviving fragment of the medieval Leighfield Forest. It is semi-natural ancient woodland with several unusual herbs, such as broadleaved helleborine, herb paris and violet helleborine. It is thought to have the most diverse fungi of any wood in the county.
Holwell Reserves	Holwell Reserves	16.4 hectares (41 acres)	Melton Mowbray; 52.803°N 0.902°W; SK 741234	YES		Former quarries on this site have soil which is low in nutrients and lime-rich, creating conditions for many species of wildflower to flourish. Old mine tunnels are used by Natterer's, Daubenton's, brown long-eared and pipistrelle bats.
Kelham Bridge	Kelham Bridge	8.1 hectares (20 acres)	Coalville; 52.704°N 1.399°W; SK 407120	YES		The conversion of this former sewage disposal site to a nature reserve was completed in 2002. The River Sence has been diverted to create meanders, extending flooded areas and reedbeds; 101 bird, 19 butterfly and 16 dragonfly species have been recorded.
Ketton Quarry	Ketton Quarry	27.5 hectares (68 acres)	Stamford; 52.637°N 0.558°W; SK 977053	YES	SSSI	Calcareous grassland on this site provides a habitat for rare moths, grizzled and dingy skipper butterflies, common lizards and adders. There are also areas of woodland, which have the only yellow bird's-nest plants in the county, and scrub, which is valuable for birds such as the turtle dove.
Launde Woods	Launde Big Wood	99 hectares (240 acres)	Leicester; 52.624°N 0.842°W; SK 785036	YES	SSSI	This site is in two separate areas. Launde Big Wood is ancient semi-natural woodland with a rich ground flora, including wood anemone, wood forget-me-not and sweet woodruff. Most of Launde Park Wood has been planted with conifers, but the northern third has the same range of plants as the Big Wood.
Lea Meadows	Lea Meadows	12 hectares (30 acres)	Leicester; 52.699°N 1.253°W; SK 506115	YES	SM, SSSI	Over 240 species of plants have been recorded on these unimproved marshy meadows, and there is a stream which has white-clawed crayfish and brook lampreys, both of which are legally protected. Part of the site is surrounded by a medieval moat.
Loughborough Big Meadow	Loughborough Big Meadow	35.3 hectares (87 acres)	Loughborough; 52.791°N 1.204°W; SK 538218	YES	SSSI	Summerpool Brook runs through this unimproved hay meadow, which is periodically flooded. It has diverse herbs, including great burnet, meadow saxifrage, yellow rattle, common bird's-foot trefoil, pepper-saxifrage and the nationally uncommon narrow-leaved water-dropwort.
Lucas Marsh	Lucas Marsh	1.5 hectares (3.7 acres)	Oadby; 52.592°N 1.085°W; SP 621998	YES	LNR	The marsh is dominated by greater willowherb and common reed, while there are also areas of rough grassland, a hedge, trees and scrub. Butterflies include small tortoiseshell, speckled wood, peacock and orange tip.
Merry's Meadows	Merry's Meadows	12.6 hectares (31 acres)	Oakham; 52.731°N 0.612°W; SK 938157	YES	SSSI	These ridge and furrow meadows are the only known location in the county for the frog orchid. The soil is on boulder clay, and grasses include crested dog's-tail, sweet vernal-grass, upright brome, downy oat-grass and quaking grass. There are four ponds with common and great crested newts.
Mountsorrel Meadows	Mountsorrel Meadows	12.6 hectares (31 acres)	Leicester; 52.720°N 1.128°W; SK 590140	PP		This site on the bank of the River Soar was farmland until 2006, but is now managed for wildlife. Areas of wet woodland have been created by a combination of planting and natural regeneration. Other parts of the site are now wet grassland and wet scrapes.
Narborough Bog	Narborough Bog	9.2 hectares (23 acres)	Leicester; 52.576°N 1.191°W; SP 549979	YES	SSSI	This site has a large area of common reed on peat, and there is also wet woodland, dominated by crack willow. Both areas have diverse butterflies and moths, including several locally uncommon species. In the south of the site there are two wet grazed meadows and more woodland.
Prior's Coppice	Prior's Coppice	29 hectares (72 acres)	Oakham; 52.637°N 0.772°W; SK 832051	YES	SSSI	This wood is on poorly drained soils derived from Jurassic Upper Lias clay and glacial boulder clay. The dominant trees are ash and oak, with field maple and hazel in the shrub layer. There is a diverse ground flora typical of ancient clay woods.
Rocky Plantation	Rocky Plantation	3.4 hectares (8.4 acres)	Leicester; 52.702°N 1.272°W; SK 493118	YES	NT	This site has mixed woodland, including some mature sessile oaks, and rocky outcrops. There is a variety of fungi and birds, including great spotted woodpeckers and nuthatches.
Rutland Water	Rutland Water	393 hectares (970 acres)	Oakham; 52.654°N 0.662°W; SK 906071	YES	NCR, Ramsar, SPA, SSSI	This site has four-man-made lagoons, with islands which provide a safe area for nesting birds. There are also wildflower meadows with species rich hedgerows, mature woods and plantations dating to the 1970s.
Stonesby Quarry	Stonesby Quarry	4 hectares (9.9 acres)	Melton Mowbray; 52.816°N 0.795°W; SK 813250	YES	SSSI	This site on Jurassic Lincolnshire Limestone has grassland with diverse herb species, such as autumn gentian, cowslip, dwarf thistle, small scabious, pyramidal orchid and clustered bellflower.
Tilton Railway Cutting	Tilton Railway Cutting	3.1 hectares (7.7 acres)	Leicester; 52.642°N 0.877°W; SK 761055	YES	GCR, SSSI	This is the best site in the East Midlands which exposes the sequence of rocks in the Lower Jurassic around 180 million years ago. There are many fossils, including Tiltoniceras acutum, an age-diagnostic ammonite. The site has rich flora and diverse common birds.
Ulverscroft	Ulverscroft	56 hectares (140 acres)	Leicester; 52.707°N 1.276°W; SK 490124	YES	NT, SSSI	The site has diverse habitats with woodland, heath, wet grassland, a pond, a meadow, marshes and sphagnum bog. The meadow has a rich flora, including fragrant orchid, devil's-bit scabious and bitter vetch.
Wanlip Meadows	Wanlip Meadows	16.2 hectares (40 acres)	Leicester; 52.688°N 1.109°W; SK 603104	YES		These meadows, which are sometimes flooded by the River Soar, are grazed by cattle. There are many birds, including the uncommon Temminck's stint and wood sandpiper. Invertebartes include grass snakes, frogs and toads.
Wymeswold Meadows	Wymeswold Meadows	4.5 hectares (11 acres)	Loughborough; 52.802°N 1.191°W; SK 614231	YES		The River Mantle runs through steeply sloping banks in this grassland site, which has diverse flora and invertebrates. Butterflies include orange tips, small coppers, common blues and small heaths.
Wymondham Rough	Wymondham Rough	12.5 hectares (31 acres)	Melton Mowbray; 52.748°N 0.770°W; SK 831174	YES	SSSI	This site has grassland, woodland, a stretch of disused canal, a marsh and ponds. The clay grassland has a rich flora, dominated by common bent, Yorkshire fog, false oat-grass and cock's foot. A poorly drained area has plants such as water avens, and there are drier soils in the west of the site.

== See also ==
- List of Sites of Special Scientific Interest in Leicestershire
- List of Sites of Special Scientific Interest in Rutland
- List of Local Nature Reserves in Leicestershire
