= Croft Pasture =

Conservation area in England

Coordinates: 52.557°N 1.25°W

- Site of Special Scientific Interest
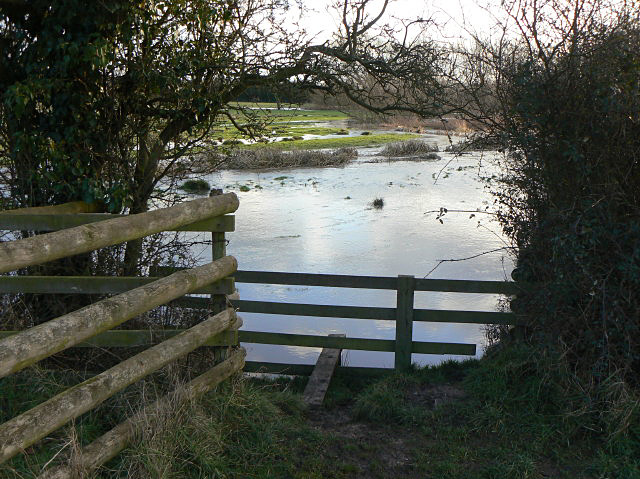
- Location of Croft Pasture.
- Area of search: Leicestershire
- Grid reference: SP 509 958
- Interest: Biological
- Area: 6.2 hectares
- Notification date: 1983
- Location map: Magic Map

Croft Pasture is a 6.2-hectare (15-acre) biological Site of Special Scientific Interest on the outskirts of Croft in Leicestershire. Most of the site, totalling 5.8 hectares, is owned and managed by the Leicestershire and Rutland Wildlife Trust.

The River Soar runs through this unimproved grazed meadow, which is dominated by common bent and crested dog's-tail. A knoll in the north of the site has uncommon flora such as meadow saxifrage, common stork's-bill and subterranean clover.

There is access from Station Road.
