= Merry's Meadows =

Nature reserve in Rutland, England

Coordinates: 52.731°N 0.612°W

- Site of Special Scientific Interest
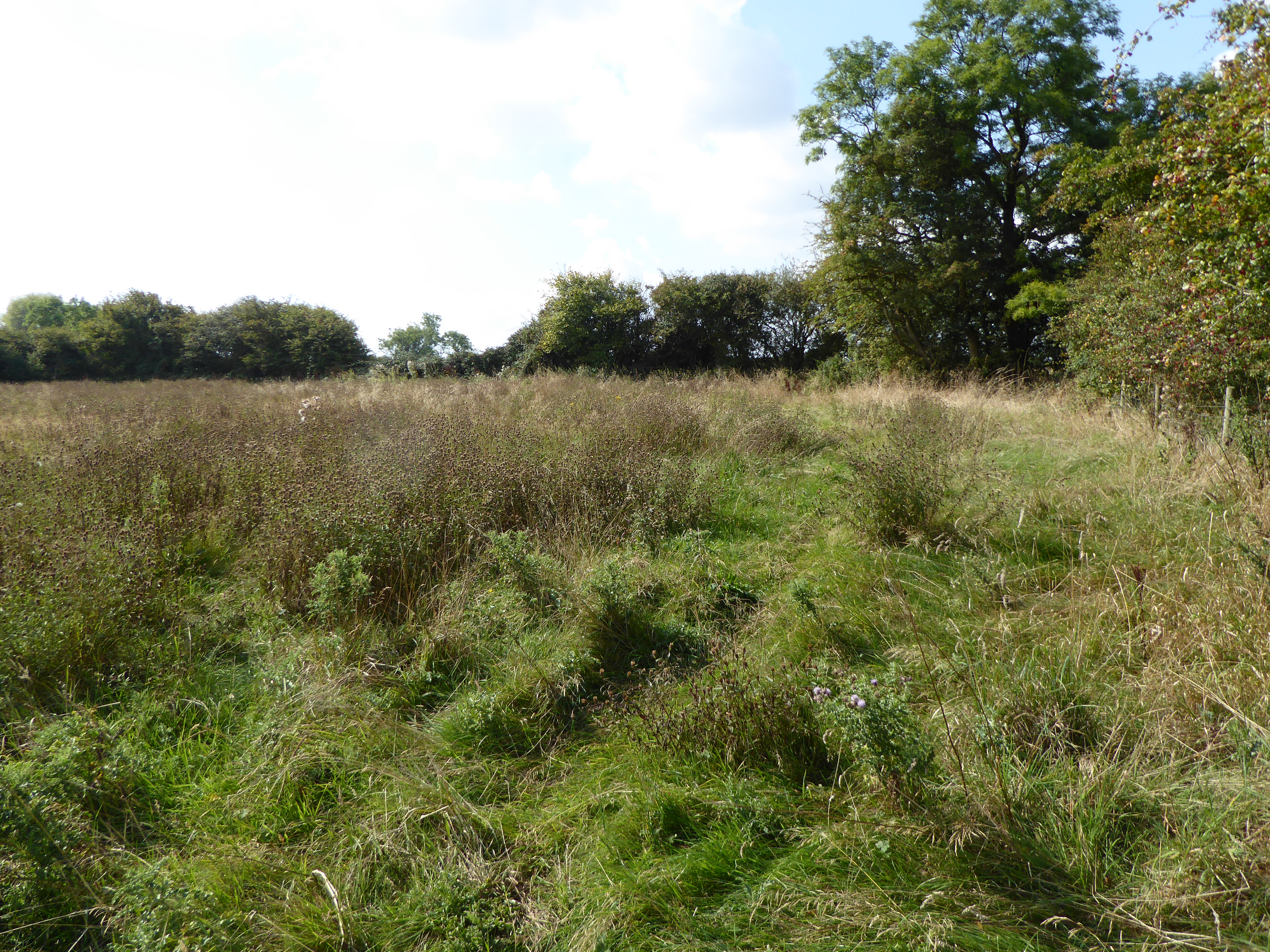
- Location of Merry's Meadows.
- Area of search: Rutland
- Grid reference: SK 938 157
- Interest: Biological
- Area: 12.4 hectares
- Notification date: 1985
- Location map: Magic Map

Merry's Meadows is a 12.4-hectare (31-acre) nature reserve west of Stretton in Rutland. It is managed by the Leicestershire and Rutland Wildlife Trust, and is a biological Site of Special Scientific Interest under the name Greetham Meadows.

This ridge and furrow meadow is the only known location in the county for the frog orchid. The soil is on boulder clay, and grasses include crested dog's-tail, sweet vernal-grass, upright brome, downy oat-grass and quaking grass. There are several ponds.

The only access is by a 400 metre footpath from the Viking Way. The path runs along the left side of a hedge until about 100 metres from the entrance, when it crosses to the right side.
