= Tilton =

Tilton may refer to:

== People and fictional characters ==
- Tilton (surname), a list of people and fictional characters with the surname
- Tilton E. Doolittle (1825–1896), American attorney and politician
- Alice Tilton, a pen name of Phoebe Atwood Taylor (1909–1976), American mystery author

== Places ==
=== United States ===
- Tilton, Georgia, an unincorporated community
- Tilton, Illinois, a village
- Tilton, Iowa, an unincorporated community
- Tilton, Kentucky, an unincorporated community
- Tilton, New Hampshire, a town
- Tilton River, Washington, United States
- Fort Tilton, a fortification built in 1856 near what is now Fall City, Washington

=== Elsewhere ===
- Tilton, Newfoundland and Labrador, Canada, a community
- Tilton, a former civil parish in Harborough, Leicestershire, England - see Tilton on the Hill

== Other uses ==
- Tilton School, a college preparatory school in Tilton, Hew Hampshire
- Battles of Tilton, civil war battles that took place near Tilton, Georgia, during the American Civil War

== See also ==
- Tilton Northfield, New Hampshire, United States
- Tilton Cutting, a geological Site of Special Scientific Interest west of Tilton on the Hill
