= Prior's Coppice =

Protected area in Rutland, England

Coordinates: 52.637°N 0.733°W

- Site of Special Scientific Interest
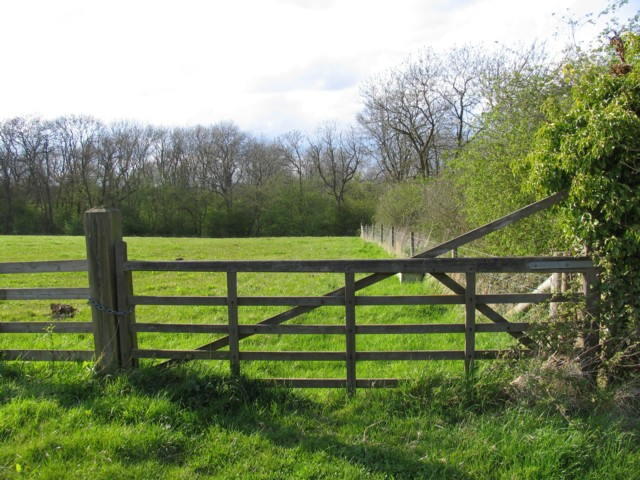
- Location of Prior's Coppice.
- Area of search: Rutland
- Grid reference: SK 831 051
- Interest: Biological
- Area: 27.4 hectares
- Notification date: 1983
- Location map: Magic Map

Prior's Coppice is a 27.4-hectare (68-acre) biological Site of Special Scientific Interest south of Oakham in Rutland. It is managed by the Leicestershire and Rutland Wildlife Trust.

This wood is on poorly drained soils derived from Jurassic Upper Lias clay and glacial boulder clay. The dominant trees are ash and oak, with field maple and hazel in the shrub layer. There is a diverse ground flora typical of ancient clay woods.

There is access from Leighfield Lane.
