= Wymondham Rough =

Protected area in Leicestershire, England

Coordinates: 52.748°N 0.77°W

- Site of Special Scientific Interest
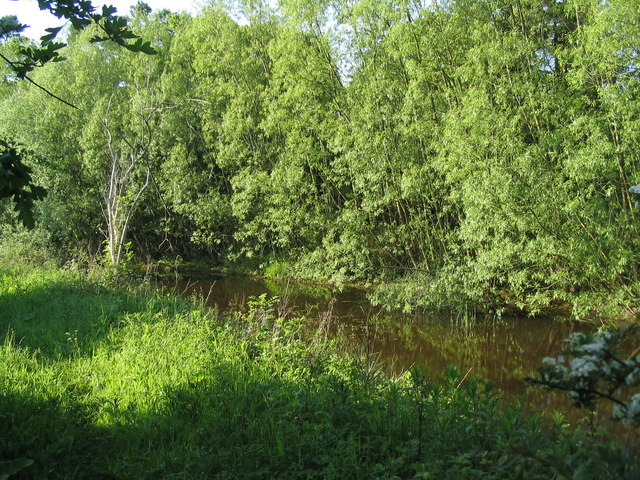
- Location of Wymondham Rough.
- Area of search: Leicestershire
- Grid reference: SK 831 174
- Interest: Biological
- Area: 6.0 hectares (15 acres)
- Notification date: 1983
- Location map: Magic Map

Wymondham Rough is a 6.0 hectares (15 acres) biological Site of Special Scientific Interest (SSSI) east of Stapleford in Leicestershire. The SSSI is part of the 12.5 hectare Wymondham Rough nature reserve, which is managed by the Leicestershire and Rutland Wildlife Trust.

This clay grassland has a rich flora, dominated by common bent, Yorkshire fog, false oat-grass and cock's foot. A poorly drained area has plants such as water avens, and there are drier soils in the west of the site.

There is access from a gate north of the level crossing.
