= Bloody Oaks Quarry =

UK Site of Special Scientific Interest

Coordinates: 52.686°N 0.564°W

- Site of Special Scientific Interest
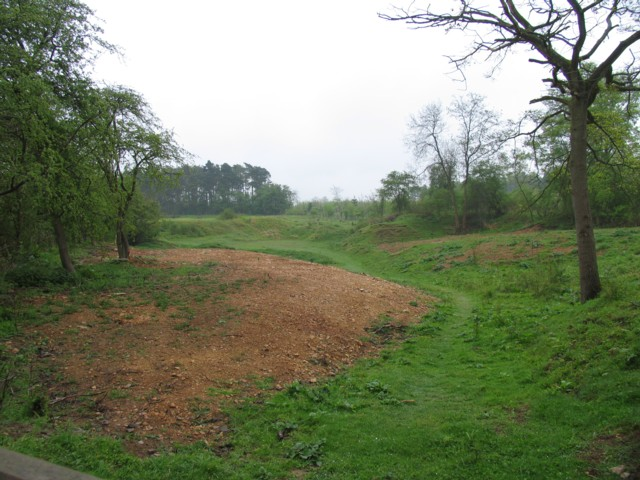
- Location of Bloody Oaks Quarry.
- Area of search: Rutland
- Grid reference: SK 971 108
- Interest: Biological
- Area: 1.2 hectares
- Notification date: 1983
- Location map: Magic Map

Bloody Oaks Quarry is a 1.3-hectare (3.2-acre) biological Site of Special Scientific Interest north-west of Great Casterton in Rutland. It is owned and managed by the Leicestershire and Rutland Wildlife Trust.

This site has species-rich grassland on Jurassic limestone. The dominant grasses are tor-grass and upright brome and flora include rock-rose, salad burnet, yellow-wort and autumn gentian.

The site is open to the public. The name alludes to the 1470 Battle of Losecoat Field (also known as the Battle of Empingham). There is mention of Bloody Oaks Wood from circa 1800.
