= Breedon Cloud Wood and Quarry =

Quarry in Leicestershire, England

Coordinates: 52.786°N 1.387°W

- Site of Special Scientific Interest
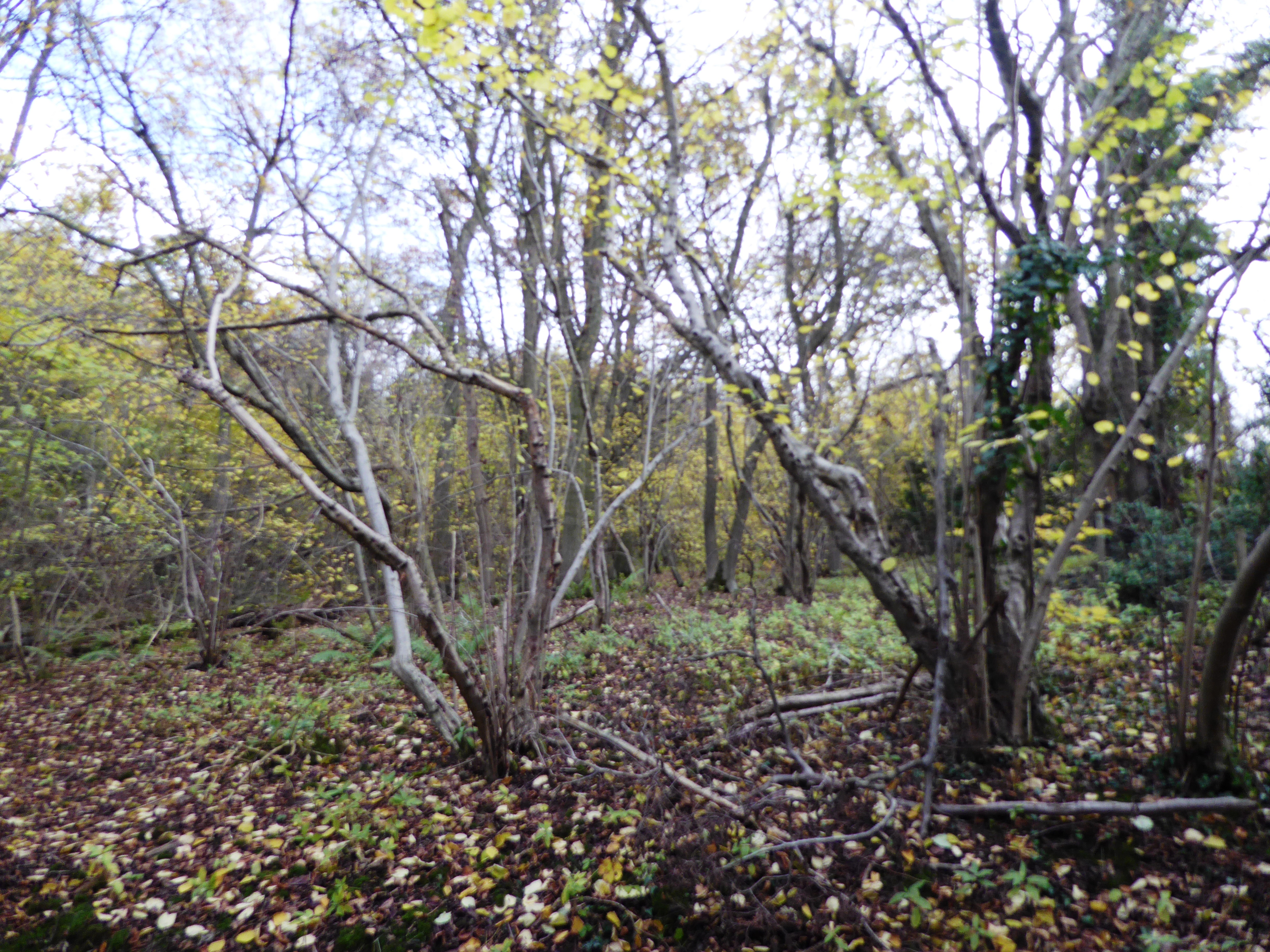
- Cloud Wood
- Location of Breedon Cloud Wood and Quarry.
- Area of search: Leicestershire
- Grid reference: SK 414 213
- Interest: Biological; Geological
- Area: 63.3 hectares (156 acres)
- Notification date: 1987
- Location map: Magic Map

Breedon Cloud Wood and Quarry is a 63.3 hectares (156 acres) biological and geological Site of Special Scientific Interest north-east of Worthington in Leicestershire. It is a Geological Conservation Review site. An area of 33 hectares (82 acres) is managed as a nature reserve by the Leicestershire and Rutland Wildlife Trust.

Cloud Wood is an ancient semi-natural wood on clay. It has a very diverse ground flora, including pendulous sedge, yellow archangel and giant bellflower. The quarry is a nationally important geological locality, exposing a Lower Carboniferous succession deposited in shallow seas.

There is public access to most of the nature reserve, but not to the quarry.
