= Tilston (disambiguation) =

Tilston is a village and a civil parish in the county of Cheshire, England.

Tilston may also refer to:

- Tilston, Manitoba, Canada

== People ==
- Eynion de Tilston (born c. 1126), Norman knight and first lord of the manor of Tilston, Cheshire
- Frederick Albert Tilston (1906–1992), Canadian World War II recipient of the Victoria Cross
- Martha Tilston (born 1975/1976), English folk-based singer-songwriter
- Steve Tilston (born 1950), English folk singer-songwriter and guitarist
- Tommy Tilston (1926–1997), English footballer
- Will Tilston (born 2007), English actor

== See also ==
- Tilton (disambiguation)
