= Cribb's Meadow =

Nature reserve in Leicestershire, England

Coordinates: 52.759°N 0.669°W

- Site of Special Scientific Interest
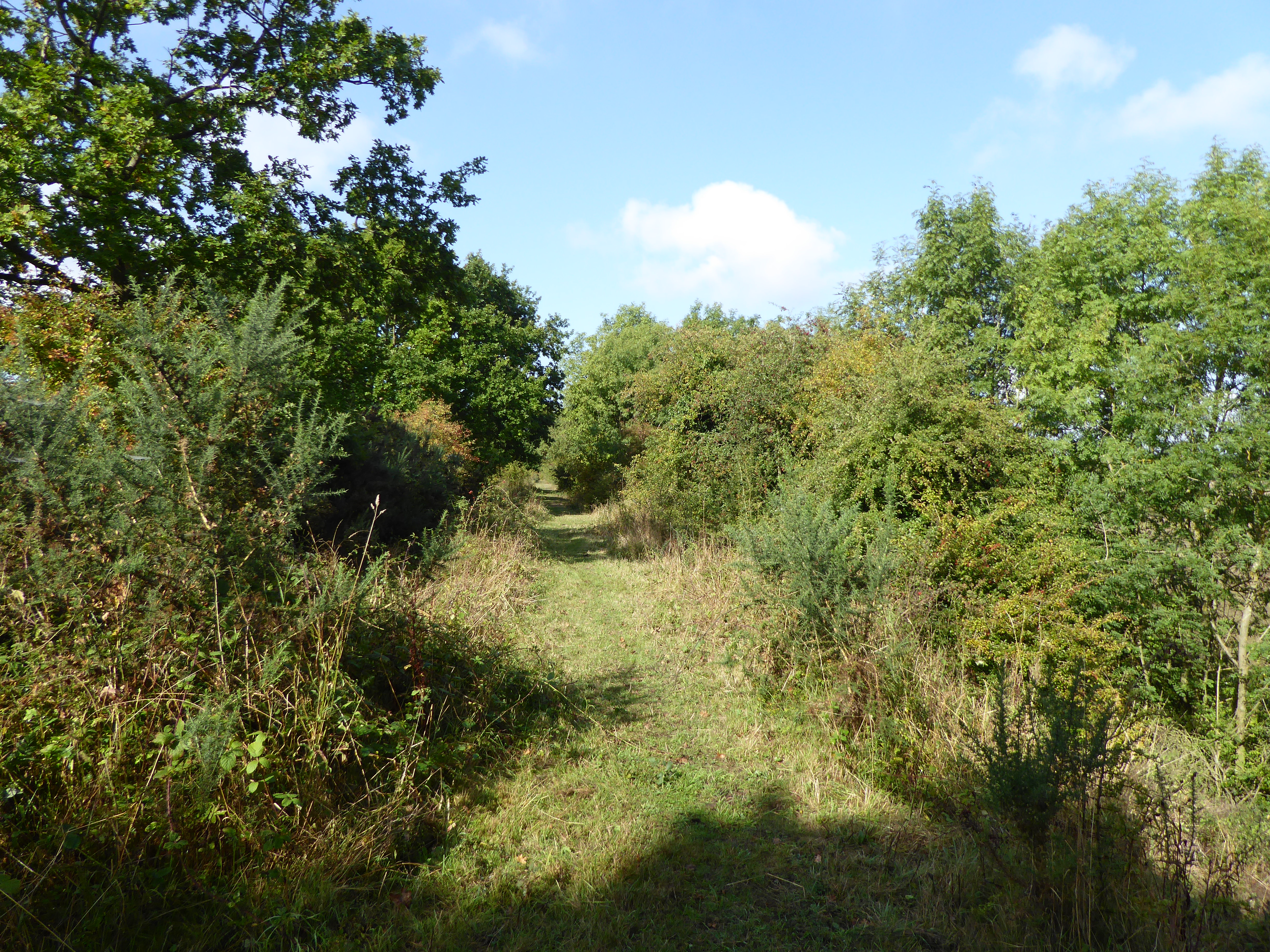
- Path along the disused railway embankment which runs through Cribb's Meadow
- Location of Cribb's Meadow.
- Area of search: Leicestershire
- Grid reference: SK 899 188
- Interest: Biological
- Area: 4.2 hectares
- Notification date: 1983
- Location map: Magic Map

Cribb's Meadow is a 4.2-hectare (10-acre) nature reserve east of Wymondham in Leicestershire. It is owned and managed by the Leicestershire and Rutland Wildlife Trust, and is designated a biological Site of Special Scientific Interest under the name Cribb's Lodge Meadows. It is also a National Nature Reserve and a Nature Conservation Review site, Grade 2.

The embankment of a disused railway runs through this ridge and furrow neutral meadow on boulder clay. The diverse flora includes adder's tongue fern, pepper saxifrage, hayrattle and green-winged orchid.

There is access from Fosse Lane, and a footpath runs through the southern end.
