= Cossington Meadows =

Leicestershire, England nature reserve

Coordinates: 52.711°N 1.118°W

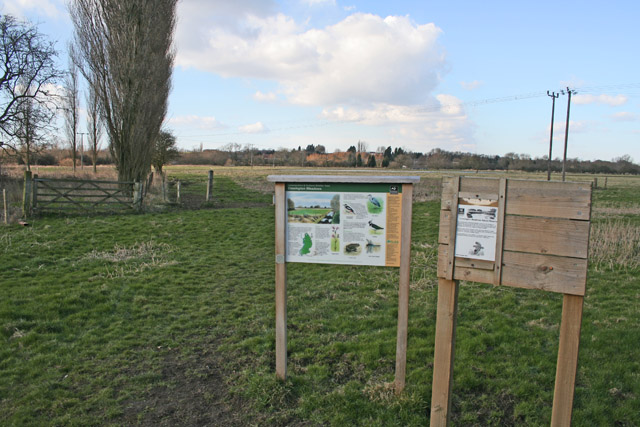
- Interactive map of Cossington Meadows
- Type: Nature reserve
- Location: Cossington, Leicestershire
- OS grid: SK 597130
- Area: 88.9 hectares (220 acres)
- Manager: Leicestershire and Rutland Wildlife Trust

Cossington Meadows is an 88.9 hectares (220 acres) nature reserve west of Cossington in Leicestershire. It is managed by the Leicestershire and Rutland Wildlife Trust.

Flora on this wetland site include flowering rush, purple loosestrife and blue water-speedwell. There are several pools which attract wildfowl, such as gadwall and tufted duck, which breed on the site.

There is access from Syston Road.
