= Dimminsdale =

UK Site of Special Scientific Interest

Coordinates: 52.79°N 1.443°W

- Site of Special Scientific Interest
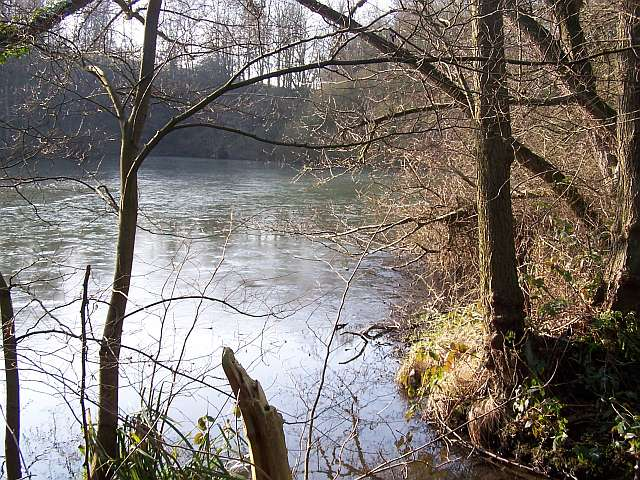
- Location of Dimminsdale.
- Area of search: Derbyshire; Leicestershire
- Grid reference: SK 377 218
- Interest: Biological; Geological
- Area: 37.0 hectares
- Notification date: 1986
- Location map: Magic Map

Dimminsdale is a 37 hectare geological and biological Site of Special Scientific Interest partly in Derbyshire and partly in Leicestershire. It is located east of Calke in Derbyshire. It is a Geological Conservation Review site, and an area of 23.5 hectares is owned by Severn Trent Water and managed by the Leicestershire and Rutland Wildlife Trust.

Dimminsdale has semi-natural woodland and one of the largest areas of unimproved acidic grassland in the county. Earl Ferrers' lead mine, which is located on the site, has a unique and complex mixture of minerals such as galena and zinc blende; their genesis is little understood and they provide great potential for research.

There is public access to footpaths on the nature reserve part of the site.
