= Georgie Auld =

Canadian jazz musician (1919–1990)

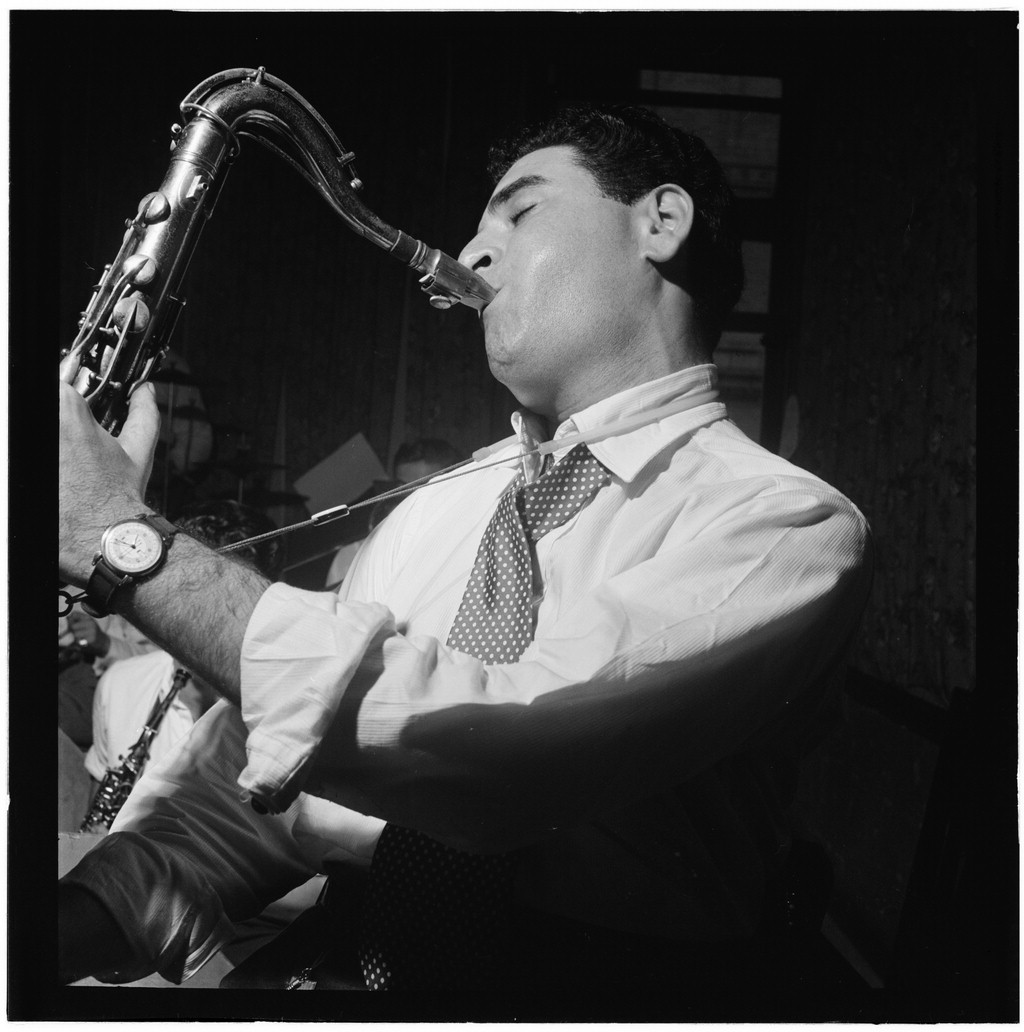
- Auld, c. 1947

Background information
- Born: John Altwerger; May 19, 1919; Toronto, Ontario, Canada
- Died: January 8, 1990 (aged 70) Palm Springs, California, U.S.
- Genres: Jazz
- Occupation: Musician
- Instruments: Tenor saxophone, clarinet
- Years active: 1940s–1970s
- Labels: Roost, Apollo, Coral, EmArcy, Xanadu, ABC-Paramount, Discovery, Jasmine

Georgie Auld (May 19, 1919 – January 8, 1990) was a Canadian jazz tenor saxophonist, clarinetist, and bandleader.

== Early years ==
Auld was born John Altwerger in Toronto, Canada, and moved to Brooklyn, New York, in 1929. Before the family left Canada, Auld's parents bought him an alto saxophone, which he taught himself to play. He later switched to the tenor saxophone, after hearing a Coleman Hawkins recording.

== Career ==
Auld worked with Bunny Berigan, Artie Shaw, Benny Goodman, Erroll Garner, Dizzy Gillespie, Al Porcino, Billy Eckstine, Tiny Kahn, and Frank Rosolino. Primarily a swing saxophonist, Auld was a member of big bands and led big bands, including Georgie Auld and His Orchestra and Georgie Auld and His Hollywood All Stars. He played rock and roll while working for Alan Freed in 1959.

In 1949, Auld played Carl in The Rat Race in the Ethel Barrymore Theater on Broadway. In 1952, he had a small part in the film The Marrying Kind. In 1977, he played a bandleader in the 1977 motion picture New York, New York, starring Liza Minnelli and Robert De Niro and also acted as a technical consultant for the film. Auld also performed with Thelma Gracen alongside other musicians during her singing career.

== Death ==
Auld died on January 8, 1990, in Palm Springs, California, aged 70.

== Discography ==
=== As leader ===
- Manhattan (Coral, 1953)
- Misty (Coral, 1955)
- I've Got You Under My Skin (Coral, 1955)
- Smoke Gets in Your Eyes (Coral, 1955)
- Lullaby of Broadway (Coral, 1956)
- Georgie Auld and His All Star Orchestra (Allegro, 1956)
- In the Land of Hi-Fi (EmArcy/Mercury, 1956)
- Dancing in the Land of Hi-Fi (EmArcy/Mercury, 1956)
- That's Auld (Brunswick, 1957) with The Rhythmaires
- Sax Gone Latin (Capitol, 1958) with The Rhythmaires
- Manhattan with Strings (United Artists, 1959)
- Georgie Auld Plays for Melancholy Babies (ABC-Paramount, 1959)
- The Melody Lingers On (Top Rank, 1959)
- Hawaii On the Rocks (Jaro, 1959)
- The Georgie Auld Quintet Plays the Winners (Philips, 1963)
- Here's to the Losers (Philips, 1963)
- In Japan (Columbia, 1964)
- By George! (Swing House 1981)
- Homage (Xanadu, 1982)

=== As sideman ===
- Mike Bryan, Mike Bryan and His Sextet in Concert (Storyville, 1962)
- Mike Bryan, Mike Bryan Sextet (Storyville, 1981)
- Charlie Christian, With the Benny Goodman Sextet and Orchestra (Columbia, 1955)
- Alexander Courage, Hot Rod Rumble (Liberty, 1957)
- Buddy DeFranco, Buddy DeFranco Plays Benny Goodman (Verve, 1957)
- Buddy DeFranco, Wholly Cats (Verve, 1957)
- Buddy DeFranco, Closed Session (Verve, 1979)
- Maynard Ferguson, Maynard Ferguson and His Octet (Emarcy, 1955)
- Maynard Ferguson, Around the Horn with Maynard Ferguson (Emarcy, 1956)
- The Four Freshmen, Four Freshmen and Five Saxes (Capitol, 1957)
- Ella Fitzgerald, 30 by Ella (Capitol, 1968)
- Benny Goodman, Fletcher Henderson Arrangements (Columbia, 1953)
- Jack Kane, Kane Is Able (Coral, 1958)
- Barney Kessel, Vol. 3: To Swing or Not to Swing (Contemporary, 1955)
- Steve Lawrence, Swing Softly with Me (ABC-Paramount, 1959)
- The Modernaires, Modern Aires by the Modernaires (Coral, 1956)
- Claus Ogerman, Sounds for Sick? People (Shell, 1960)
- Patti Page, In the Land of Hi-Fi (EmArcy, 1956)
- Sue Raney, Happiness Is a Warm Sue Raney (Philips, 1964)
- Buddy Rich, The Swinging Buddy Rich (Verve, 1957)
- Diana Ross, Lady Sings the Blues (Motown 1972)
- Artie Shaw, In the Blue Room/in the Cafe Rouge (RCA Victor, 1961)
- Jeri Southern, Southern Breeze (Roulette, 1958)
- Dan Terry, Lonely Place (Happy Tiger, 1969)
- Mel Torme, A Day in the Life of Bonnie and Clyde (Liberty, 1968)
- Dinah Washington, Dinah! (Emarcy 1956)
- Kitty White, A New Voice in Jazz (EmArcy, 1955)
