= Altar Stones Nature Reserve =

Nature reserve in Leicestershire, England

Coordinates: 52.692°N 1.284°W

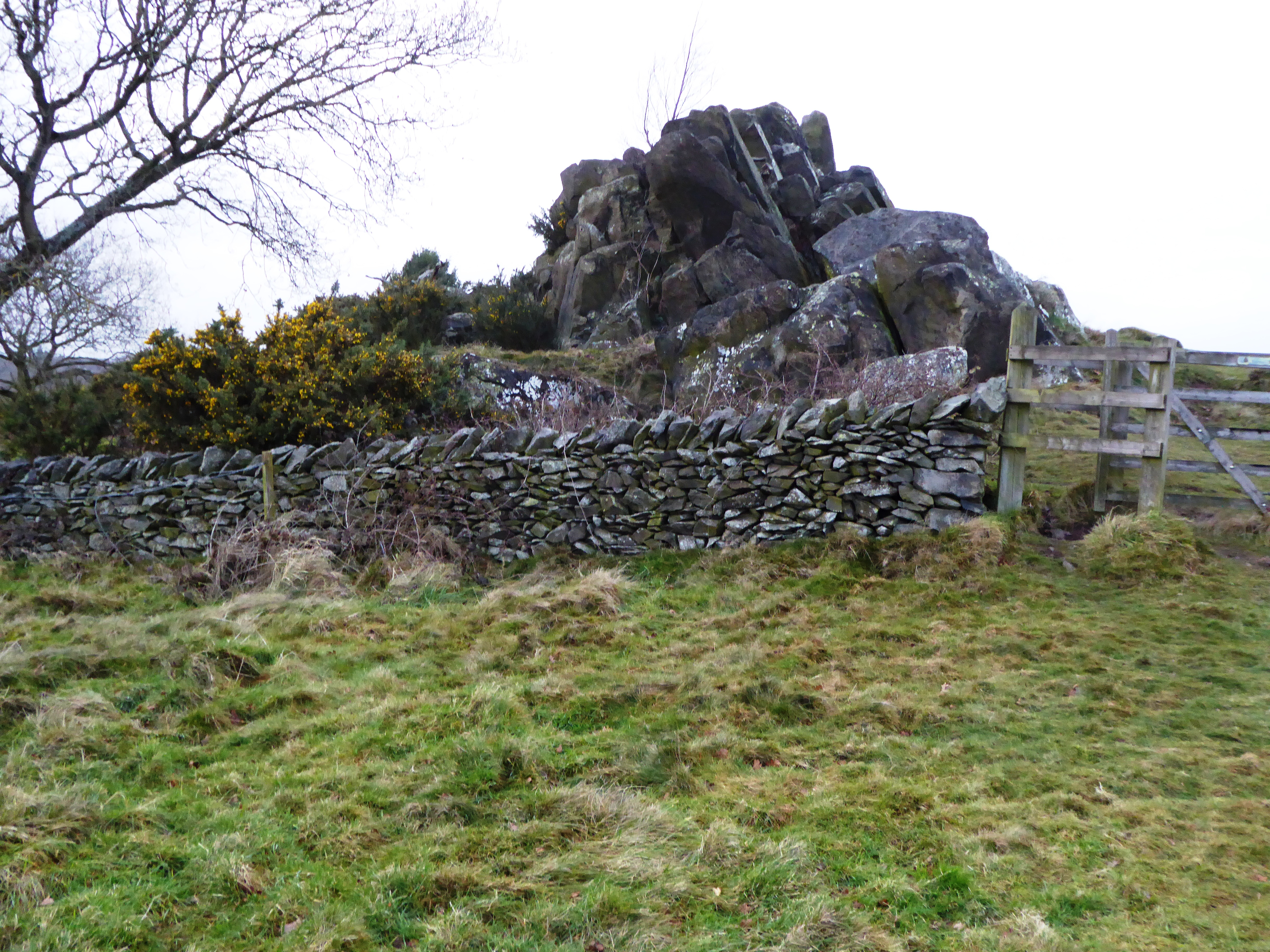
- Interactive map of Altar Stones Nature Reserve
- Type: Nature reserve
- Location: Markfield, Leicestershire
- OS grid: SK 485 107
- Area: 3.7 hectares (9.1 acres)
- Manager: Leicestershire and Rutland Wildlife Trust

Altar Stones is a 3.7-hectare (9.1-acre) nature reserve in Markfield in Leicestershire. It is owned and managed by the Leicestershire and Rutland Wildlife Trust.

This site has outcrops of Precambrian volcanic rocks, which have uncommon lichens growing on them. The main habitat is heath grassland, and there are the remains of drystone walls and an old mill.

There is access from Altar Stones Lane.
