= Charnwood Lodge =

UK Site of Special Scientific Interest

Coordinates: 52.733°N 1.312°W

- Site of Special Scientific Interest
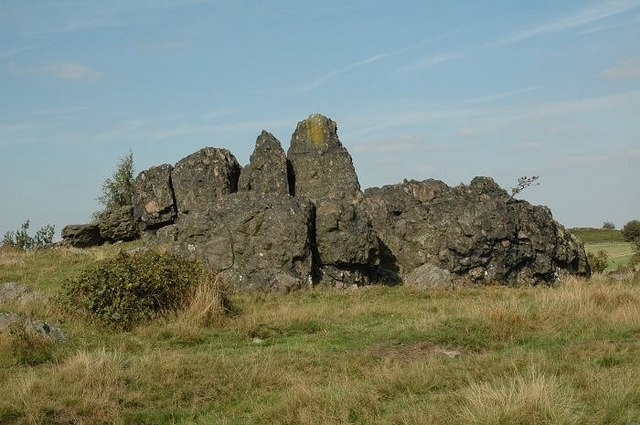
- The 'bomb rocks'
- Location of Charnwood Lodge.
- Area of search: Leicestershire
- Grid reference: SK 466 153
- Interest: Biological; Geological
- Area: 134.2 hectares
- Notification date: 1985
- Location map: Magic Map

Charnwood Lodge is a 134.2-hectare (332-acre) biological and geological Site of Special Scientific Interest in Charnwood Forest, east of Coalville in Leicestershire. It is a national nature reserve, and contains two Geological Conservation Review sites. It is managed by the Leicestershire and Rutland Wildlife Trust.

This is the largest area of moorland in the East Midlands, and it is mainly covered by bracken on dry hills, while wet heath is dominated by purple moor-grass. The site is geologically important for the 'bomb' rocks, volcanic blocks dating the Ediacaran period around 600 million years ago.

Part of the site is open to the public, with access from Warren Hills Road.
