= Stonesby Quarry =

Site of Special Scientific Interest in Leicestershire, England

Coordinates: 52.817°N 0.796°W

- Site of Special Scientific Interest
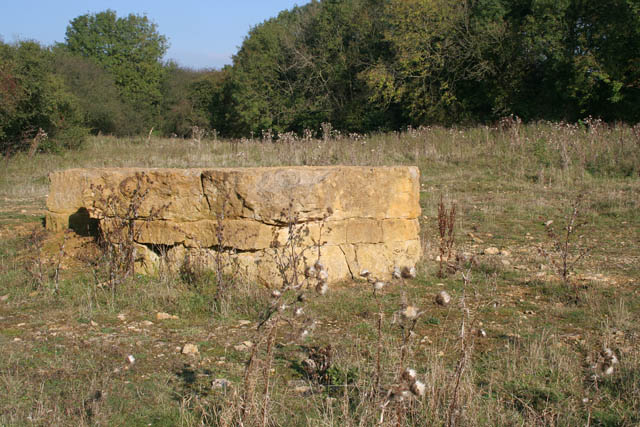
- Location of Stonesby Quarry.
- Area of search: Leicestershire
- Grid reference: SK 812 251
- Interest: Biological
- Area: 3.2 hectares (7.9 acres)
- Notification date: 1983
- Location map: Magic Map

Stonesby Quarry is a 3.2 hectares (7.9 acres) biological Site of Special Scientific Interest between Stonesby and Waltham on the Wolds in Leicestershire. It is part of a 4 hectare nature reserve managed by the Leicestershire and Rutland Wildlife Trust.

This site on Jurassic Lincolnshire Limestone has grassland with diverse herb species, such as autumn gentian, cowslip, dwarf thistle, small scabious, pyramidal orchid and clustered bellflower.

A public footpath from Waltham on the Wolds goes through the site.
