= Kelham Bridge =

Nature reserve in Leicestershire, England

Coordinates: 52.704°N 1.399°W

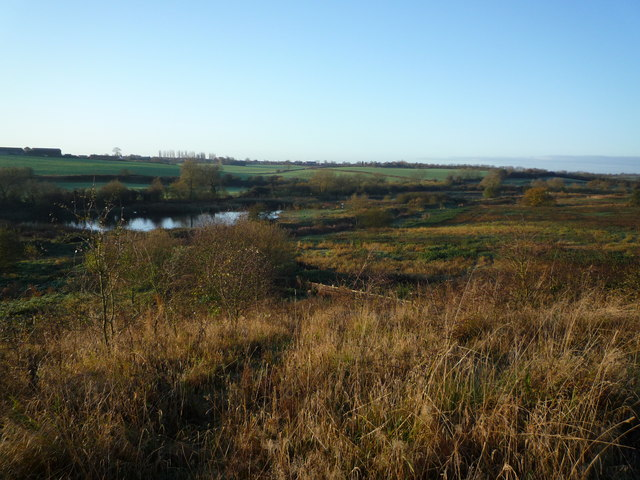
- Interactive map of Kelham Bridge
- Type: Nature reserve
- Location: Ibstock, Leicestershire
- OS grid: SK 407120
- Area: 8.1 hectares (20 acres)
- Manager: Leicestershire and Rutland Wildlife Trust

Kelham Bridge is a 8.1 hectares (20 acres) nature reserve north of Ibstock in Leicestershire. It is owned and managed by the Leicestershire and Rutland Wildlife Trust.

The conversion of this former sewage disposal site to a nature reserve was completed in 2002. The River Sence has been diverted to create meanders, extending flooded areas and reedbeds; 101 bird, 19 butterfly and 16 dragonfly species have been recorded.

There is access from the A447 road.
