= Holwell Reserves =

Nature reserve in Leicestershire, England

Coordinates: 52.803°N 0.902°W

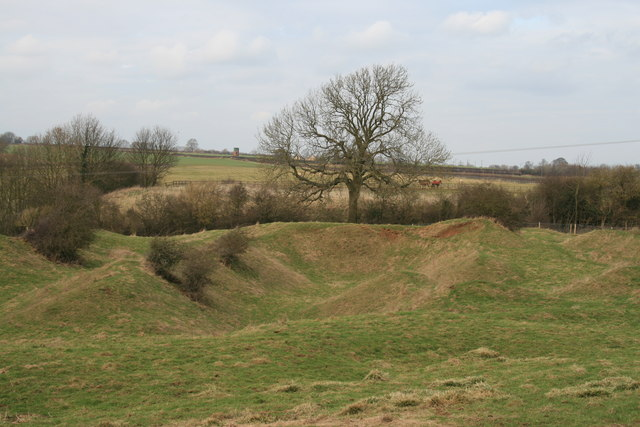
- Brown's Hill Quarry
- Interactive map of Holwell Reserves
- Type: Nature reserve
- Location: Melton Mowbray, Leicestershire
- OS grid: SK 741234
- Area: 16.4 hectares (41 acres)
- Manager: Leicestershire and Rutland Wildlife Trust

Holwell Reserves is a 16.4 hectares (41 acres) nature reserve north of Melton Mowbray in Leicestershire. It is owned and managed by the Leicestershire and Rutland Wildlife Trust, and is composed of Brown's Hill Quarry, Holwell Mineral Line and North Quarry.

Former quarries on this site have soil which is low in nutrients and lime-rich, creating conditions for many species of wildflower to flourish. Old mine tunnels are used by Natterer's, Daubenton's, brown long-eared and pipistrelle bats.

There is public access to the reserves.
