= Narborough Bog =

Protected area in Leicestershire, England

Coordinates: 52.576°N 1.191°W

- Site of Special Scientific Interest
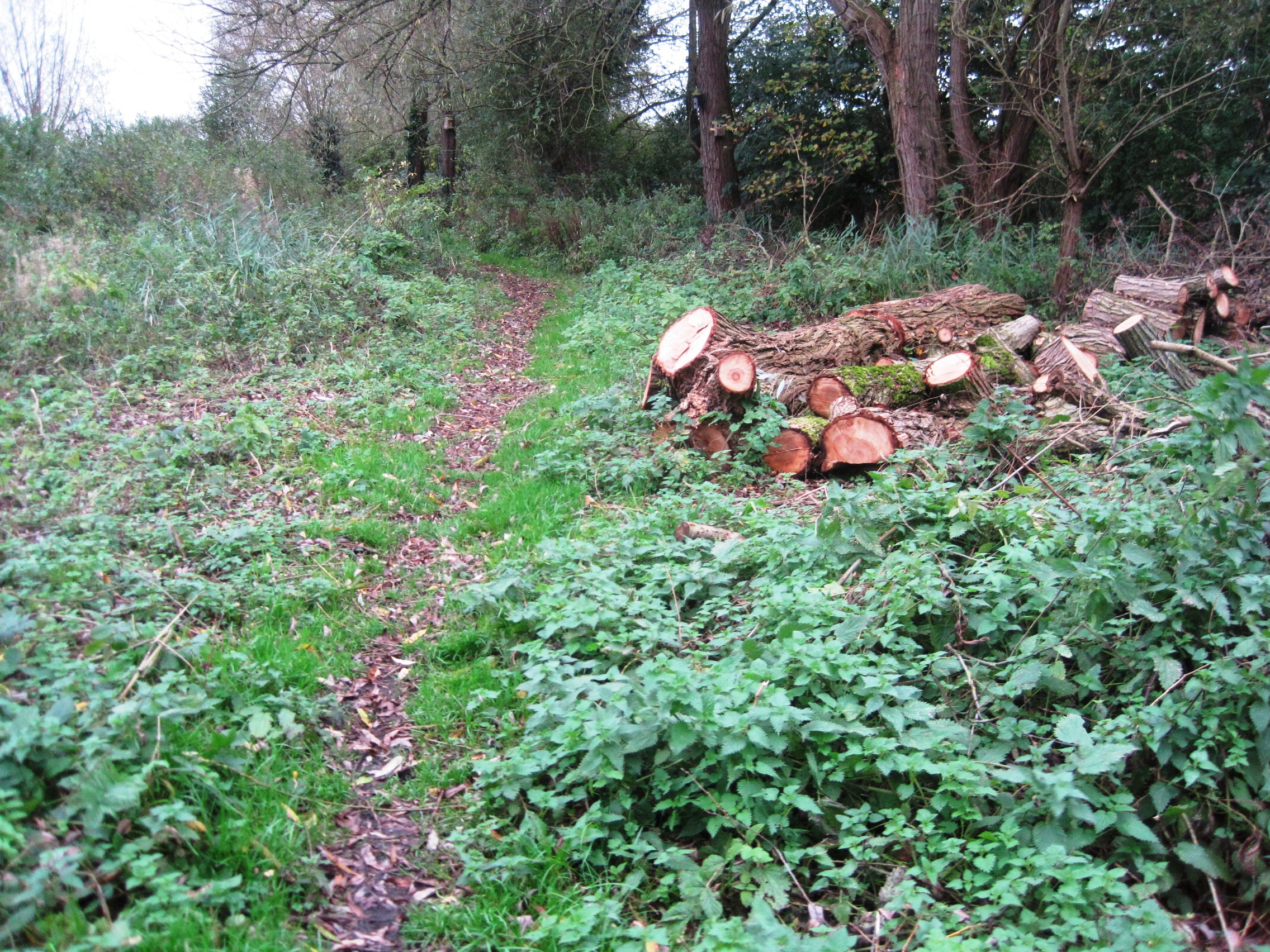
- Location of Narborough Bog.
- Area of search: Leicestershire
- Grid reference: SP 549 978
- Interest: Biological
- Area: 8.5 hectares
- Notification date: 1983
- Location map: Magic Map

Narborough Bog is an 8.5-hectare (21-acre) biological Site of Special Scientific Interest east of Narborough in Leicestershire. It is owned and managed by the Leicestershire and Rutland Wildlife Trust.

This site has a large area of common reed on peat, and there is also wet woodland, dominated by crack willow. Natural England's citation for the site states that it is 'exceptionally rich' in species of butterflies and moths, including several locally uncommon species. In the south of the site there are two wet grazed meadows and more woodland.

The entrance to the site is at the northern end of the local recreation ground, which is off Leicester Road.
