= Charley Woods =

Nature reserve in Leicestershire, England

Coordinates: 52.729°N 1.297°W

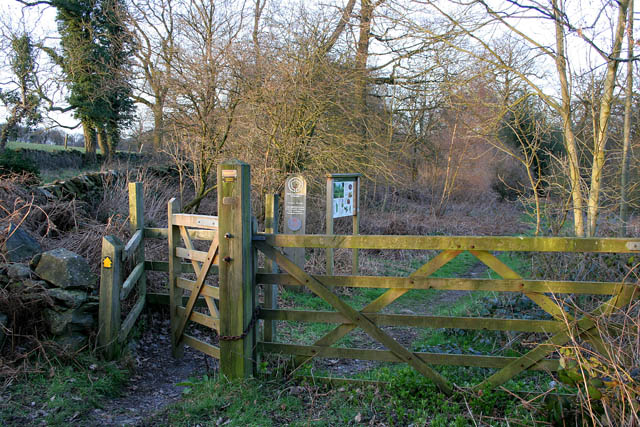
- Entrance to Burrow Wood
- Interactive map of Charley Woods
- Type: Nature reserve
- Location: Copt Oak, Leicestershire
- OS grid: SK 476148
- Area: 26.8 hectares (66 acres)
- Manager: Leicestershire and Rutland Wildlife Trust

Charley Woods is a 26.8 hectares (66 acres) nature reserve north of Copt Oak in Leicestershire. It is owned and managed by the Leicestershire and Rutland Wildlife Trust. It consists of Cat Hill Wood and Burrow Wood, with a field between them.

These ancient woods are dominated by pedunculate oak, with sparse ground flora. There is a considerable amount of dead wood, which attracts a variety of birds, including all three native species of woodpecker.

There is access by a track from the Whitwick Road.
