= Thelma Gracen =

American singer

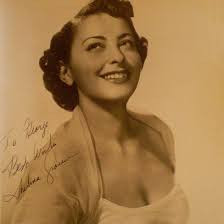
- Thelma Gracen circa. 1950's
- Born: January 6, 1922; Chicago, Illinois
- Died: October 24, 1994 (aged 72)
- Occupation: Singer
- Relatives: Jorie B. Gracen (niece)

Thelma Gracen (January 6, 1922 - October 24, 1994) was an American jazz singer during the 1950s. She was known for singing in various bands, such as the Freddie Slack orchestra, Jimmy Dorsey orchestra, and the Jan Garber orchestra.

== Early life ==
Thelma Gracen was born on January 6, 1922, in Chicago, Illinois. She began singing at the age of 12 in the clubs and dances in her neighbourhood.

== Career ==
Gracen started her singing career by performing at downtown venues and the suburbs of Chicago. In 1946, she performed with the Jerry Salone orchestra in Springfield, Illinois. In 1947, she began her first major performance with a band, the Gay Claridge orchestra where she sang "Jukebox Serenade". Later, in 1950 and 1951, she became the vocalist of orchestras such as the Jimmy Dorsey band, the Jan Garber orchestra, and the Shep Fields orchestra (credited as Shep Fields and his Rippling Rhythm Orchestra). During a performance in 1955 with the Freddie Slack orchestra, Gracen was discovered by Maynard Ferguson (an EmArcy Records artist) to be signed to the record label Wing Records to create her first solo album after discovering her true talent in singing. In November of 1955, Gracen released her first and only solo self-titled LP album which featured a studio band of West Coast jazz musicians such as Georgie Auld and Lou Levy. She also released one single in January 1957, "An Angel is Crying", which was supposedly her last recording made. She also made an appearance as vocalist on another album by Freddie Slack in 1955 titled, Boogie Woogie on the 88.

== Death ==
Gracen died on October 24, 1994, at the age of 72. After her death, her niece Jorie B. Gracen said that "Thelma would be glad to know that people are listening to her beautiful voice".

== Discography ==
Solo albums

- Thelma Gracen (1955, Wing Records)

As guest vocalist

- Boogie Woogie on the 88 (with the Freddie Slack Orchestra, Wing Records, Mercury Records)

Singles

- I'm Forever Blowing Bubbles (1950 with the Ripplers and Shep Fields and his orchestra)
- The Christmas Symphony (1950 with Shep Fields and his orchestra)
- Silver Bells (1950 with Shep Fields and his orchestra)
- Sun Showers (1950 with Shep Fields and his orchestra)
- Harbor Lights (1950 with Shep Fields and his orchestra)
- Painting the Clouds with Sunshine (1951 with Jan Garber and his orchestra)
- Between 18th and 19th on Chestnut Street (1955 with Freddie Slack and his orchestra)
- Beat Me Daddy Eight To The Bar (1955 with Freddie Slack and his orchestra)
- Rhum Boogie (1955 with Freddie Slack and his orchestra)
- Down the Road a Piece (1955 with Freddie Slack and his orchestra)
- Cow Cow Boogie (1955 with Freddie Slack and his orchestra)
- I Want You to Want Me (with Shep Fields and his orchestra)

Compilation albums

- Thelma Gracen/Introducing Millie Vernon (with Millie Vernon)
