= Wymeswold Meadows =

Nature reserve in Leicestershire, England

Coordinates: 52.802°N 1.191°W

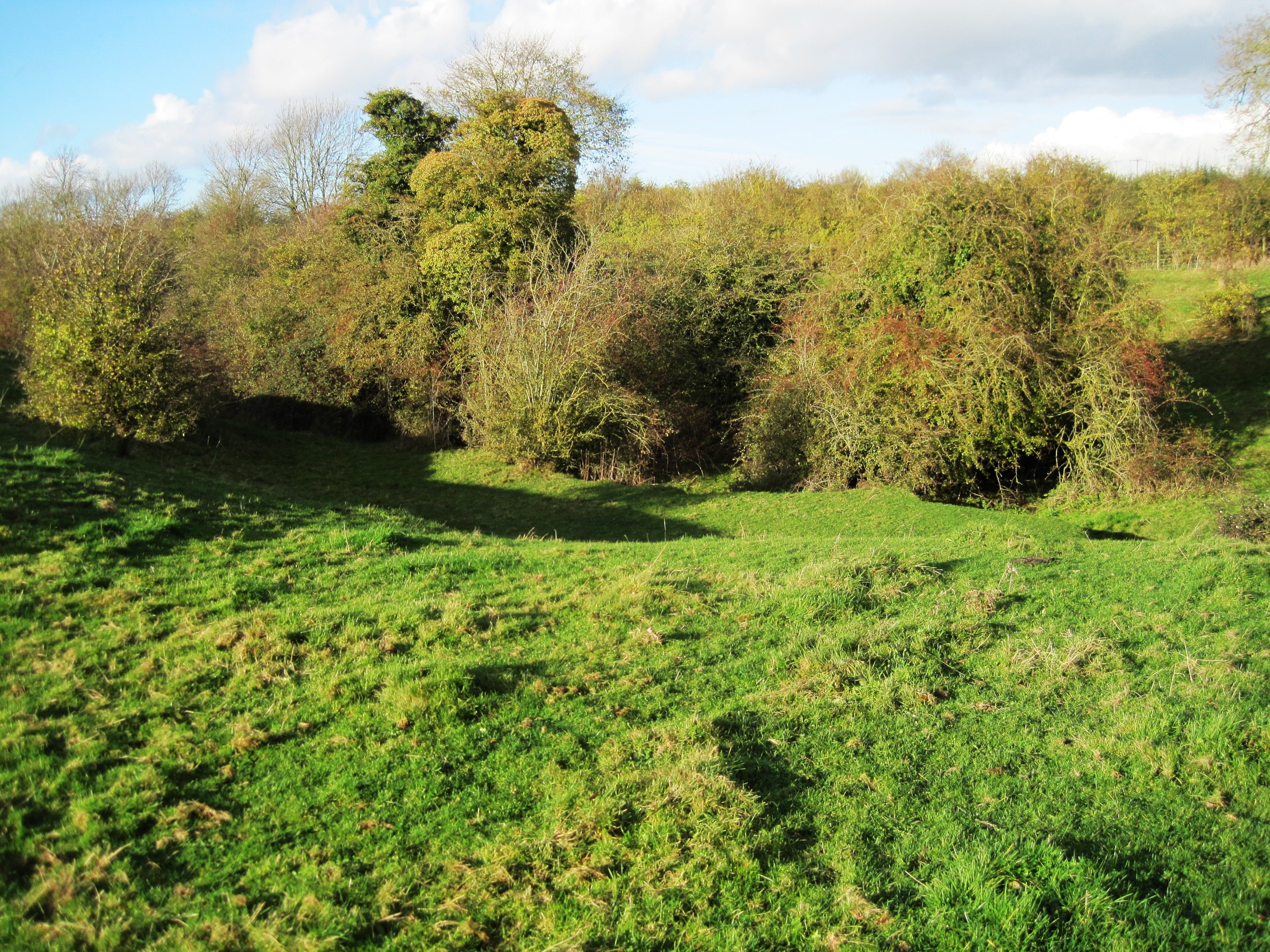
- Interactive map of Wymeswold Meadows
- Type: Nature reserve
- Location: Wymeswold, Leicestershire
- OS grid: SK 614231
- Area: 4.5 hectares (11 acres)
- Manager: Leicestershire and Rutland Wildlife Trust

Wymeswold Meadows is a 4.5-hectare (11-acre) nature reserve east of Wymeswold in Leicestershire. It is owned and managed by the Leicestershire and Rutland Wildlife Trust.

The River Mantle runs through steeply sloping banks in this meadow site, which has diverse flora and invertebrates. Butterflies include orange tips, small coppers, common blues and small heaths.

There is access from Narrow Lane.
