= Mountsorrel Meadows =

Nature reserve in Leicestershire, England

Coordinates: 52.72°N 1.128°W

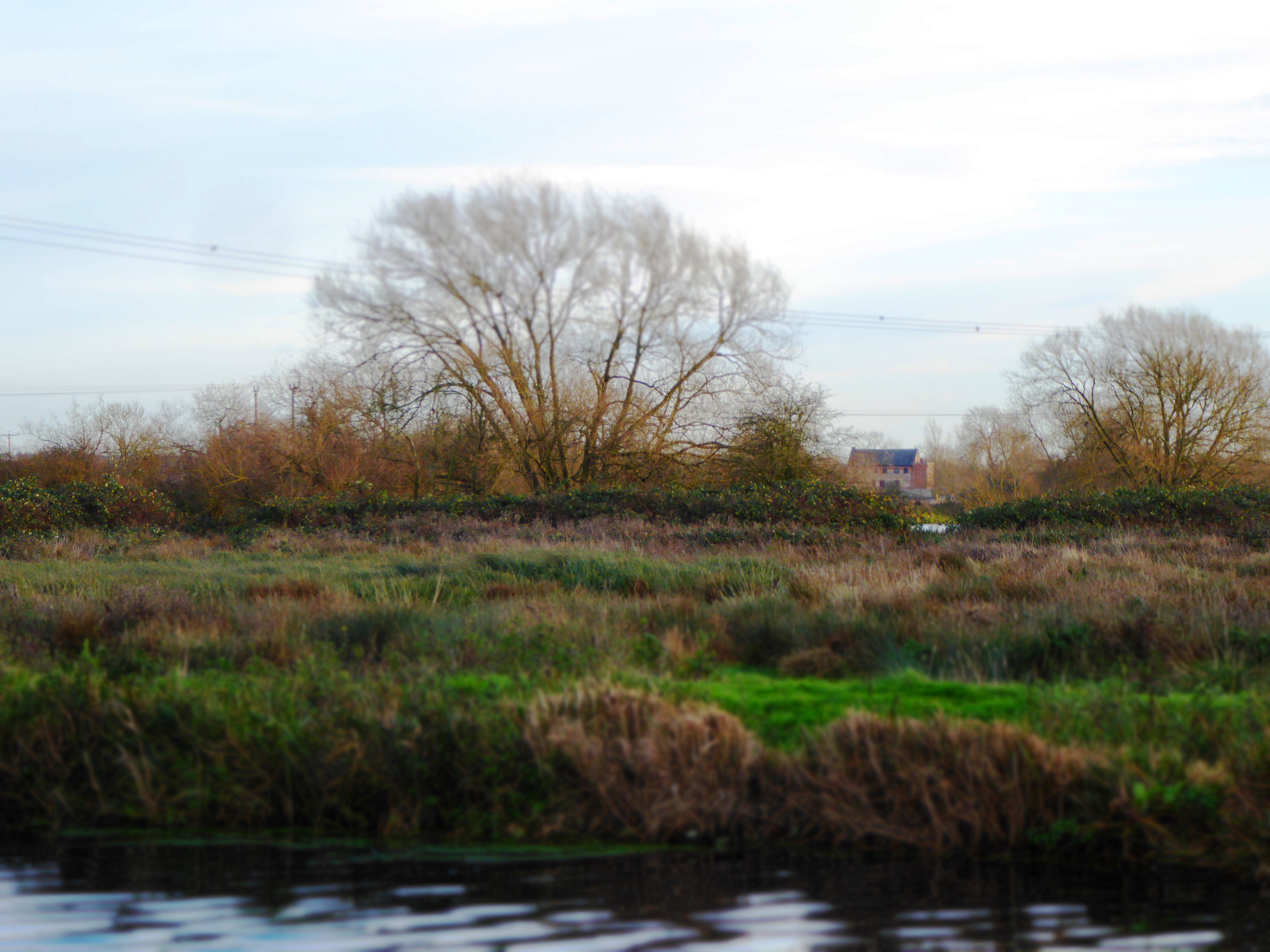
- Interactive map of Mountsorrel Meadows
- Type: Nature reserve
- Location: Mountsorrel, Leicestershire
- OS grid: SK590140
- Area: 12.6 hectares (31 acres)
- Manager: Leicestershire and Rutland Wildlife Trust

Mountsorrel Meadows is a 12.6-hectare (31-acre) nature reserve on the eastern outskirts of Mountsorrel in Leicestershire. It is purchased by the Leicestershire and Rutland Wildlife Trust in 2004.

This site on the bank of the River Soar was farmland until 2006, but is now managed for wildlife. Areas of wet woodland have been created by a combination of planting and natural regeneration. Other parts of the site are now wet grassland and wet scrapes.

There is access to the site by footpaths, but visitors are requested to use the viewing platform and not to enter the main meadow.
