= Loughborough Meadows =

Nature reserve in Leicestershire, England

Coordinates: 52.791°N 1.206°W

- Site of Special Scientific Interest
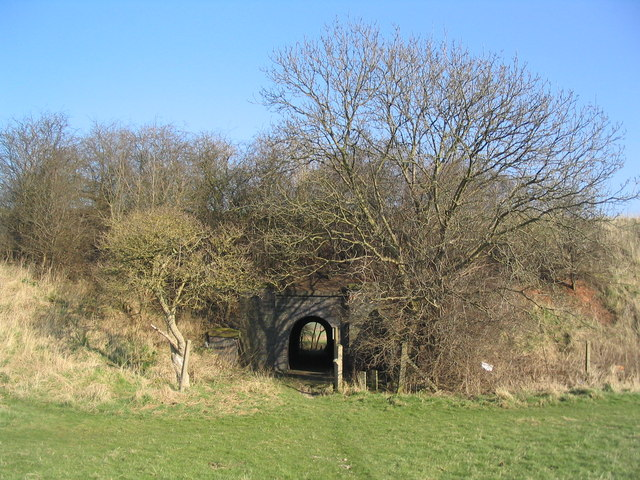
- Location of Loughborough Meadows.
- Area of search: Leicestershire
- Grid reference: SK 538 216
- Interest: Biological
- Area: 60.5 hectares (149 acres)
- Notification date: 1987
- Location map: Magic Map

Loughborough Meadows is a 60.5 hectares (149 acres) biological Site of Special Scientific Interest on the northern outskirts of Loughborough in Leicestershire, England. An area of 35.3 hectares (87 acres) is managed as a nature reserve by the Leicestershire and Rutland Wildlife Trust.

This is the largest area of unimproved alluvial flood meadow in the county, and wet areas are dominated by creeping bent and marsh foxtail. A brook has large areas of marsh foxtail, and there is a field with breeding lapwings and redshanks.

There is public access to the site.
