= Rocky Plantation =

Coordinates: 52.702°N 1.272°W

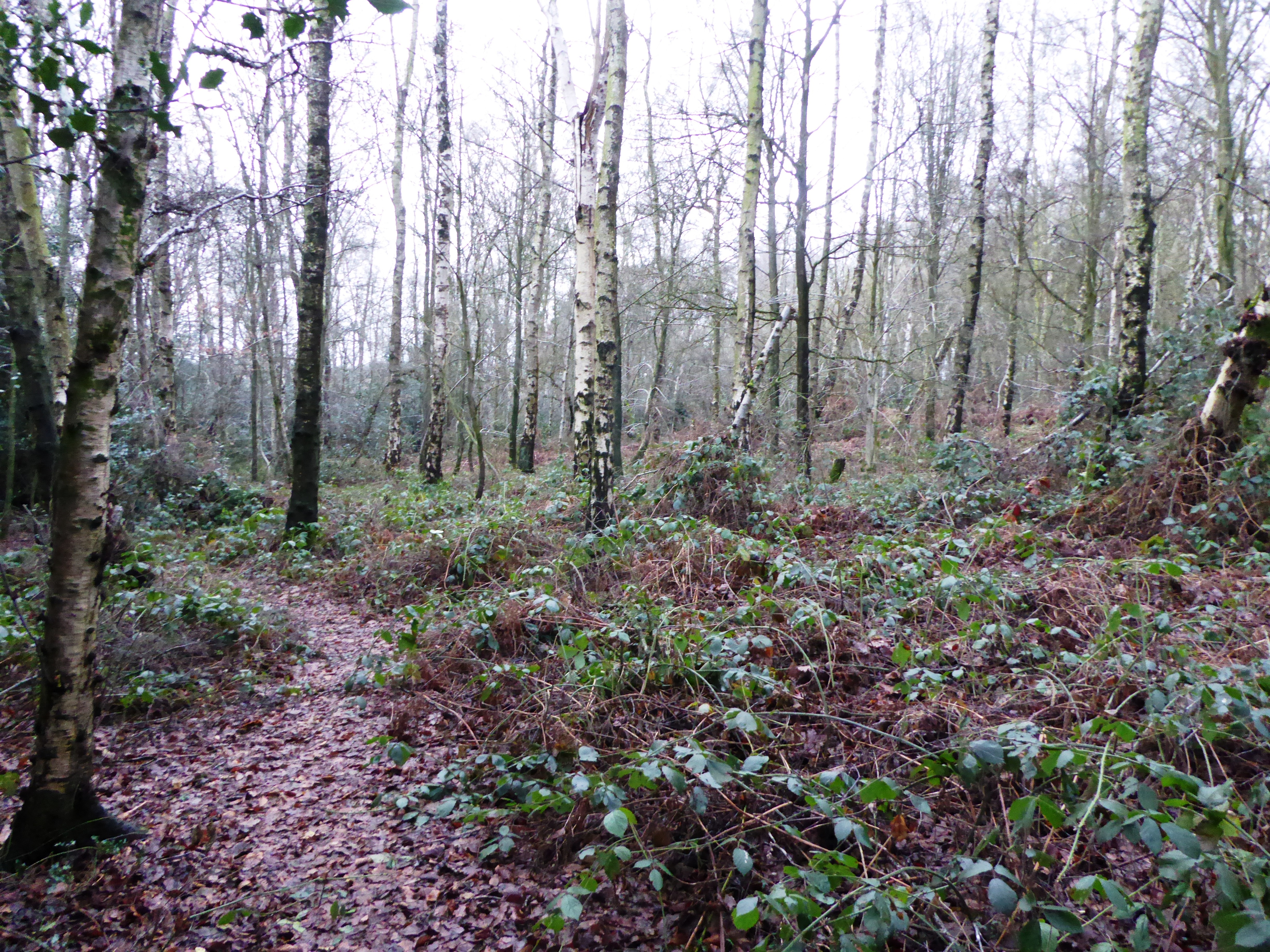
- Interactive map of Rocky Plantation
- Type: Nature reserve
- Location: Markfield, Leicestershire
- OS grid: SK 493118
- Area: 3.4 hectares (8.4 acres)
- Manager: Leicestershire and Rutland Wildlife Trust

Rocky Plantation is a 3.4-hectare (8.4-acre) nature reserve north of Markfield in Leicestershire. It is owned by the National Trust and managed by the Leicestershire and Rutland Wildlife Trust.

This site has mixed woodland, including some mature sessile oaks, and rocky outcrops. There is a variety of fungi and birds, including great spotted woodpeckers and nuthatches.

Admission is restricted to National and Wildlife trust members. There is access from Priory Lane.
