= Jan Garber =

American violinist and jazz bandleader (1894–1977)

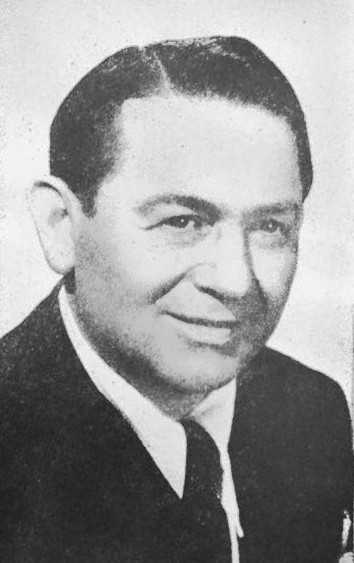
- Jan Garber, c. 1942

Background information
- Born: Jacob Charles Garber; November 5, 1894; Indianapolis, Indiana, U.S.
- Died: October 5, 1977 (aged 82) Shreveport, Louisiana, U.S.
- Genres: Jazz, swing
- Occupations: Musician, bandleader
- Instrument: Violin
- Years active: 1920–1970s
- Labels: Columbia, Brunswick, Victor, Decca, Okeh, Hit, Black & White, Capitol, Dot

Jan Garber (born Jacob Charles Garber, November 5, 1894 – October 5, 1977) was an American violinist and jazz bandleader.

== Biography ==
Garber was born in Indianapolis, Indiana. He had his own band by the time he was 21. He became known as "The Idol of the Air Lanes" in his heyday of the 1920s and 1930s, playing jazz in the vein of contemporaries such as Guy Lombardo. Garber played violin with the Philadelphia Symphony Orchestra after World War I and formed the Garber-Davis Orchestra with pianist Milton Davis from 1921 to 1924. After parting with Davis, he formed his own orchestra, playing both "sweet" and "hot" 1920s dance music. He was hit hard by the Great Depression, and in the 1930s he refashioned his ensemble into a big band and recorded a string of successful records for Victor. During World War II, Garber began playing swing jazz, a rather unexpected turn; his arranger during this time was Gray Rains and his vocalist was Liz Tilton. The recording restrictions in America during the war eventually made his ensemble unfeasible, and he returned to "sweet" music after the war, continuing to lead ensembles until 1971. His last show was in Houston. Garber died in Shreveport, Louisiana, in 1977.

He started his first band, a quartet, in 1918, and played violin in it. During the 1920s he formed the Garber-Davis Orchestra in Atlanta with pianist Milton Davis, playing mostly in the southern U.S. In 1927 he moved the band to Chicago and met Canadian bandleader and saxophonist Freddie Large. He took over Large's band, playing violin as leader, and played in Chicago and the midwest. While performing at the Trianon he received national attention when the shows were broadcast live over radio. An announcer called Garber "The Idol of the Air Lanes".

He signed with Decca and toured on the West Coast of the U.S., playing Catalina Island. In 1942, he departed from Guy Lombardo–type music and began a swing band, but after three years the band was an expensive failure and he retired for a short time. When he returned to music, he played again with Large and with Larry Owen, who had written arrangements for Lombardo. In the 1950s, he and his wife Dorothy moved to Shreveport, Louisiana, where she was born. His band was voted No. 1 Dance Band in 1959 by the Ballroom Operators of America. He retired in his seventies and died in a hospital in Shreveport on October 5, 1977.

His sidemen included Chelsea Quealey, Al Powers, Benny Davis, Bill Hearn, Bill Kleeb, Bill Oblak, Charlie Ford, Don Korinek, Don Shoup, Doug Roe, Ernie Mathias, Frank Bettencourt, Frank MacCauley, Freddie Large, Fritz Heilbron, Harold Peppie, Harry Goldfield, Jack Barrow, Jack Motch, Jerry Large, Joe Rhodes, Lew Palmer, Memo Bernabei, Norman Donahue, Paul Weirick, Rudy Rudisill, Russ Brown, Ted Bowman, Tony Briglia, Vince Di Bari, and Walter Moore.

He performed with vocalists Liz Tilton, Allan Copeland, Bob Allen, Bob Grabeau, Deanna St. Clair, Debby Claire, Dorothy Cordray, Fritz Helbron, Janis Garber, Judy Randall, Larry Dean, Lee Bennett, Marv Nielsen, Roy Cordell, Thelma Gracen, Tim Reardon, Tommy Traynor, Tony Allen, and Virginia Hamilton.

== Radio ==
Called the "Idol of the Airwaves," Garber was active on radio in the 1920s and 1930s. The table below shows some of his broadcasting activities.

Year	Group's Name	Station or Network
1922	Garber's Swiss Garden Orchestra	WLW
1926	Jan Garber and His Musical Clowns	WLW
1929	Jan Garber and His Musical Clowns	WABC (CBS)
1933	Jan Garber Orchestra	NBC
1934	Jan Garber Orchestra	KLRA
1935–36	Jan Garber Orchestra	WOR
1939	Jan Garber Orchestra	Mutual

Garber also had a 15-minute, five-days-a-week radio program, the Jan Garber Show. It was distributed by Capitol Transcriptions. He appeared numerous times on the Burns and Allen radio show.

== Band members ==
- Frank Bettencourt (trombone, conductor & arranger)
- Steve Brooks (singer)
- Verne Byers (bass)
- Don Cherry (singer)
- Bob Davis (singer)
- Janis Garber (daughter/singer; aka Kitty Thomas)
- Jack Gifford (singer)
- Thelma Gracen (singer)
- Bob Hames (guitar)
- "Muddy" Berry (drums)
- Gardner Hitchcock (drums)
- Loren Holding (saxophone)
- Freddie Large (saxophone, from 1932)
- Frank Macauley (bass, from 1934)
- Julio Maro (singer)
- Douglas Roe (piano)
- Julie Vernon (singer)
- Bill Grady (saxophone, clarinet, flute)
- Maurice J. Winter (trombone)

== Family ==
Garber moved with his family from Indianapolis to Louisville, Kentucky, when he was three months old, and lived there until he was 13. The family then moved to a small town near Philadelphia. He was the tenth of 12 children. Garber studied violin at Combs Conservatory in Philadelphia.

== Discography ==
- 1956 Satin Touch (Ridgeway)
- 1957 Dance at Home (Decca)
- 1959 Music from the Blue Room (Decca)
- 1960 Christmas Dance Party (Decca)
- 1961 Dance Program (Decca)
- 1961 Dance to the Songs Everybody Knows (Decca)
- 1961 Street of Dreams (Decca)
- 1961 Jan Garber in Danceland (Decca)
- 1961 Everybody Dance (Decca)
- 1961 You Stepped Out of a Dream (Decca)
- 1961 College Medleys (Capitol)
- 1962 Golden Waltzes from the Blue Room (MCA)
- 1962 College Songs Everybody Knows (Decca)
- 1962 Melodies and Memories (Decca)
- 1964 They're Playing Our Song (Decca)
- 1965 Dance to the Country Hits (Decca)
- 1966 The Shadow of Your Smile (Decca)
- 1968 Dancing Happy (Decca)
- 1973 Moods (Coral)
- 1978 The Uncollected Jan Garber and His Orchestra 1939–1941 (Hindsight)
- 1980 The Uncollected Vol. 2 1946–1947 (Hindsight)
- 1981 The Great American Dance Bands (Insight)
- 1984 The Uncollected Jan Garber and His Orchestra Vol. 3 1946–1947 (Hindsight)
- 1987 The Uncollected 1946–1947 Volume 4

=== Singles ===
- 1947 "Dinah" (Capitol)
- 1947 "Confidentially" (Capitol)
