= Tilton (surname) =

Tilton is a surname. Notable people with the surname include:

== People ==
- Alfred Tilton (1897–1942), Latvian-born Soviet Military Intelligence (GRU) chief, spy, and recruiter
- Ben Tilton (born 1953), American politician
- Cathy Tilton (born ?), American politician and real estate broker
- Charlene Tilton (born 1958), American actor and singer
- Chris Tilton (born 1979), American soundtrack composer
- Daniel Tilton (1763–1830), American territorial judge
- Edward Lippincott Tilton (1861–1933), American architect
- Edwin B. Tilton (1859–1926), American silent movie-era actor
- Elizabeth Richards Tilton (1834–1897), American suffragist and newspaper poetry editor; wife of Theodore Tilton
- Frances Tilton Weaver (1904–2003), American attorney
- Franklin T. Tilton (born ?), American politician
- Frederic W. Tilton (1839–1913), American educator and administrator
- George Tilton (1923–2010), American geochemist
- George Fred Tilton (1861–1932), American master mariner, whaler, storyteller, and author
- Glenn Tilton (born 1948), American airline and oil executive
- Henry R. Tilton (1836–1906), American army surgeon and cavalry officer
- Hezekiah C. Tilton (1818–1879), American Methodist clergyman, army medic, and politician
- Jack Tilton (1951–2017), American art dealer
- James Tilton (1745–1822), American physician, soldier, and army surgeon general
- James Tilton (surveyor) (1819–1878), American soldier, politician; first Surveyor General of the Washington Territory
- John Rollin Tilton (1828–1888), American-born Italian painter
- Liz Tilton (1918–2003), American singer; sister of Martha Tilton
- Lois Tilton (born 1946), American novelist and short story writer
- Lydia H. Tilton (1839–1915), American journalist and temperance activist
- Lynn Tilton (born 1959), American business executive, corporate raider, investment banker, and stock trader
- Mark Tilton (born 1962), British screenwriter, filmmaker, and musician
- Martha Tilton (1915–2006), American singer and actor; sister of Liz Tilton
- Nathaniel Tilton (born 1972), American blackjack player, author, and financial planner
- Robert Tilton (born 1946), American televangelist
- Roberta Elizabeth Odell Tilton (1837–1925), American-born Canadian social reformer and temperance activist
- Roger Tilton (1924–2011), American filmmaker and documentarian
- Ron Tilton (born 1963), American football player
- Shane Tilton (born ?), American journalism professor, writer, and media theorist
- Theodore Tilton (1835–1907), American newspaper editor, poet, and abolitionist; husband of Elizabeth Richards Tilton
- William Tilton (1834–1910), American Civil War soldier
- William S. Tilton (1828–1889), American businessman and soldier

== In fiction ==
- Maggie Tilton, character in two books in the Lonesome Dove series
- Press Tilton, character in The Pendragon Adventure book series
