= Wanlip Meadows =

Nature reserve in Leicestershire, England

Coordinates: 52.688°N 1.109°W

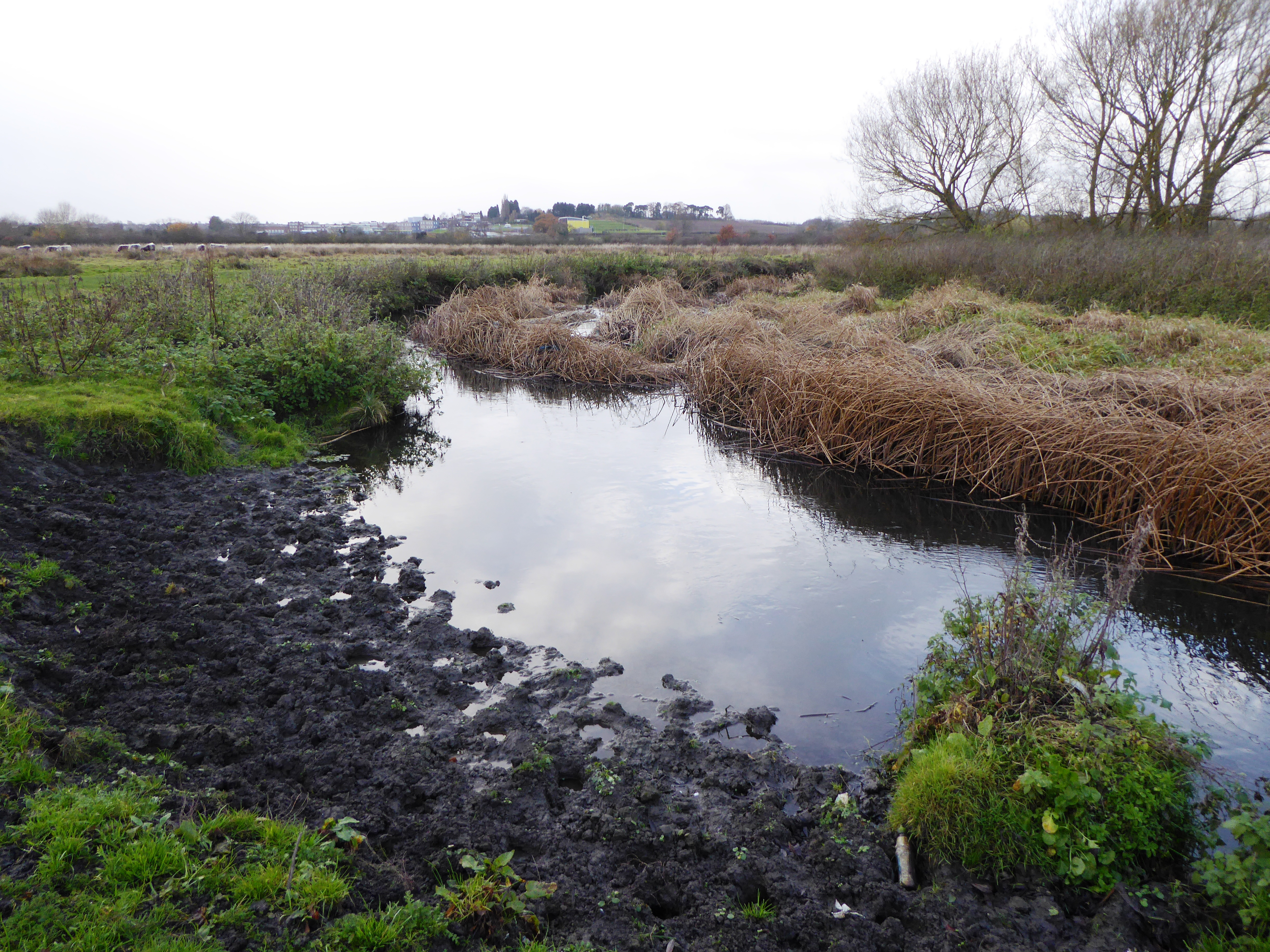
- The River Soar with Wanlip Meadows on the left
- Interactive map of Wanlip Meadows
- Type: Nature reserve
- Location: Wanlip, Leicestershire
- OS grid: SK 603104
- Area: 16.2 hectares (40 acres)
- Manager: Leicestershire and Rutland Wildlife Trust

Wanlip Meadows is a 16.2 hectares (40 acres) nature reserve south of Wanlip and north of Leicester. It is owned and managed by the Leicestershire and Rutland Wildlife Trust.

These meadows, which are sometimes flooded by the River Soar, are grazed by cattle. There are many birds, including the uncommon Temminck's stint and wood sandpiper. Invertebrates include grass snakes, frogs and toads.

There is access from a footpath along the west side of the River Soar.
