= Liz Tilton =

American singer (1918–2003)

Elizabeth A. Tilton-Hoffine (December 2, 1918 – March 14, 2003) was an American vocalist.

The younger sister of Martha Tilton, she sang with Ken Baker in the 1930s and with Buddy Rogers later in her career. Liz Tilton also appeared with Bob Crosby in 1941 and Jan Garber in 1942.
