= Tilton Cutting =

Protected area in Leicestershire, England

Coordinates: 52.64°N 0.873°W

- Site of Special Scientific Interest
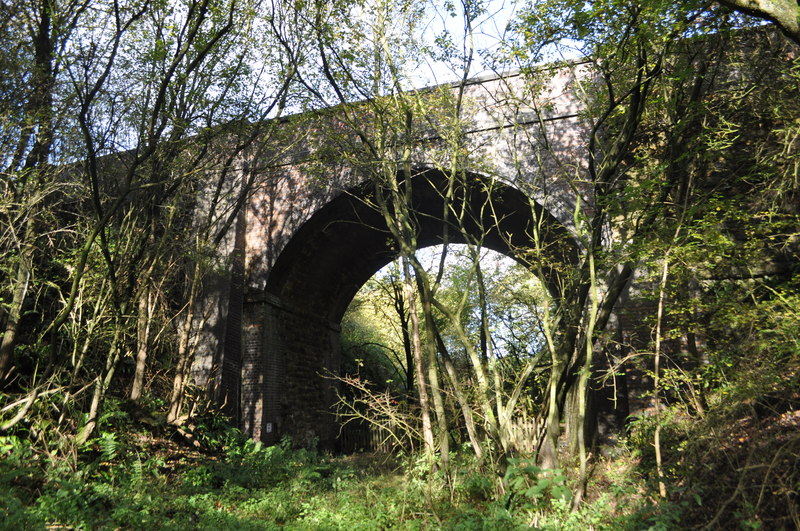
- Location of Tilton Cutting.
- Area of search: Leicestershire
- Grid reference: SK 763 052
- Interest: Geological
- Area: 4.4 hectares (11 acres)
- Notification date: 1983
- Location map: Magic Map

Tilton Cutting is a 4.4 hectares (11 acres) geological Site of Special Scientific Interest east of Tilton on the Hill in Leicestershire. It is a Geological Conservation Review site, and is owned and managed by the Leicestershire and Rutland Wildlife Trust as Tilton Railway Cutting.

This is the best site in the East Midlands which exposes the sequence of rocks in the Lower Jurassic around 180 million years ago. There are many fossils, including Tiltoniceras acutum, an age-diagnostic ammonite. The site has rich flora and diverse common birds.

There is access from the Tilton on the Hill to Oakham road.
