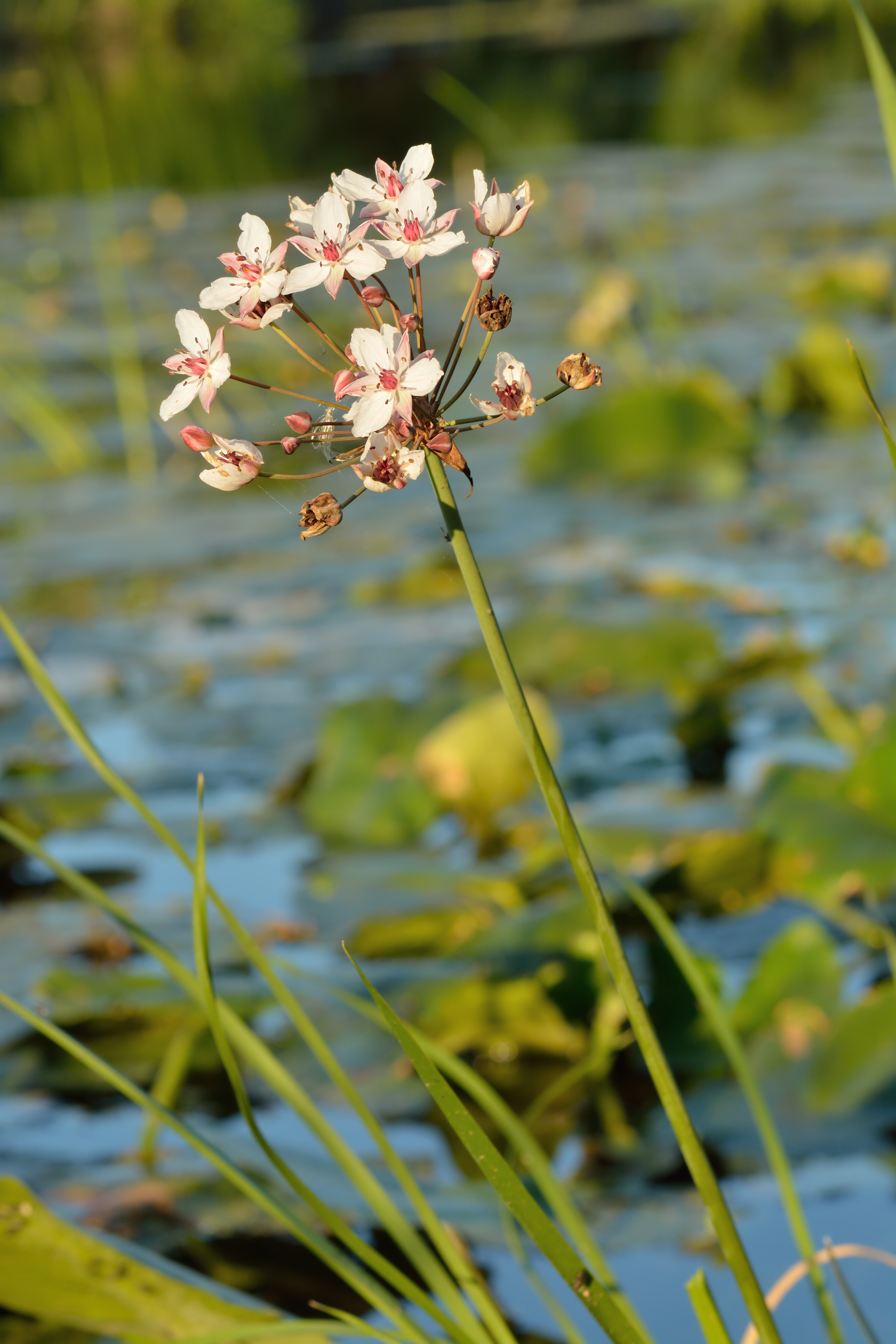

Conservation status
- Least Concern (IUCN 3.1)

Scientific classification
- Kingdom: Plantae
- Clade: Tracheophytes
- Clade: Angiosperms
- Clade: Monocots
- Order: Alismatales
- Family: Butomaceae
- Genus: Butomus
- Species: B. umbellatus

Binomial name
- Butomus umbellatus L.

Synonyms
- Butomus caesalpini Neck.; Butomus floridus Gaertn.; Butomus scutariensis Rohlena; Butomus vulgaris Gueldenst.

= Butomus umbellatus =

Flowering rush

Species of aquatic plant

Butomus umbellatus is a Eurasian plant species in the family Butomaceae. It is the only species in the family. Common names include flowering rush or grass rush. Introduced into North America as an ornamental plant it has now become a serious invasive weed in the Great Lakes area and in parts of the Pacific Northwest. In Israel, one of its native countries, it is an endangered species due to the habitat loss. It can also be found in Great Britain locally, for example at the Caldicot and Wentloog Levels. The plant is a rhizomatous, hairless, perennial aquatic plant. Its name is derived from Greek bous, meaning "cow", "ox" etc. and tome, a cut (the verb 'temnein' meaning "to cut"), which refers to the plant's swordlike leaves.

== Description ==
In contrast to what its English name suggests, it is not a true rush. It is native to Old World continents and grows on the margins of still and slowly moving water down to a depth of about 3 m. It has pink flowers.

The plant has linear, pointed leaves up to 1 metre long, or more. The leaves are triangular in cross-section and arise in two rows along the rhizome/base. They are untoothed, parallel veined and twisted.

The inflorescence is umbel-like consisting of a single terminal flower surrounded by three cymes. The flowers are regular and bisexual, 2 to 3 cm across. There are three petal-like sepals which are pink with darker veins. They persist in the fruit. The three petals are like the sepals but somewhat larger. 6–9 stamens. Carpels superior, 6–9 and slightly united at the base. When ripe they are obovoid and crowned with a persistent style. Ovules are numerous and found scattered over the inner surface of the carpel wall, except on the midrib and edges. Fruit is a follicle. The seeds have no endosperm, and a straight embryo. It flowers from July until August.

== Spread ==
Butomus umbellatus is native to Eurasia and was first found in Canada in the late 1800s and in the United States in the early 1900s. The first discovery in North America was in the St. Lawrence River in 1897. The species was unintentionally introduced into the United States’ Great Lakes through the discharge of contaminated cargo ship ballast water.

This plant spreads mostly from its rhizomes and occurs in wet areas with muddy soil, such as freshwater marshlands, lakes and streams. Butomus umbellatus will out compete native vegetation. It can also create dense root structures that become hazards for boat traffic. It is tolerant of a wide range of temperatures which gave it the potential to invade across much of the United States.

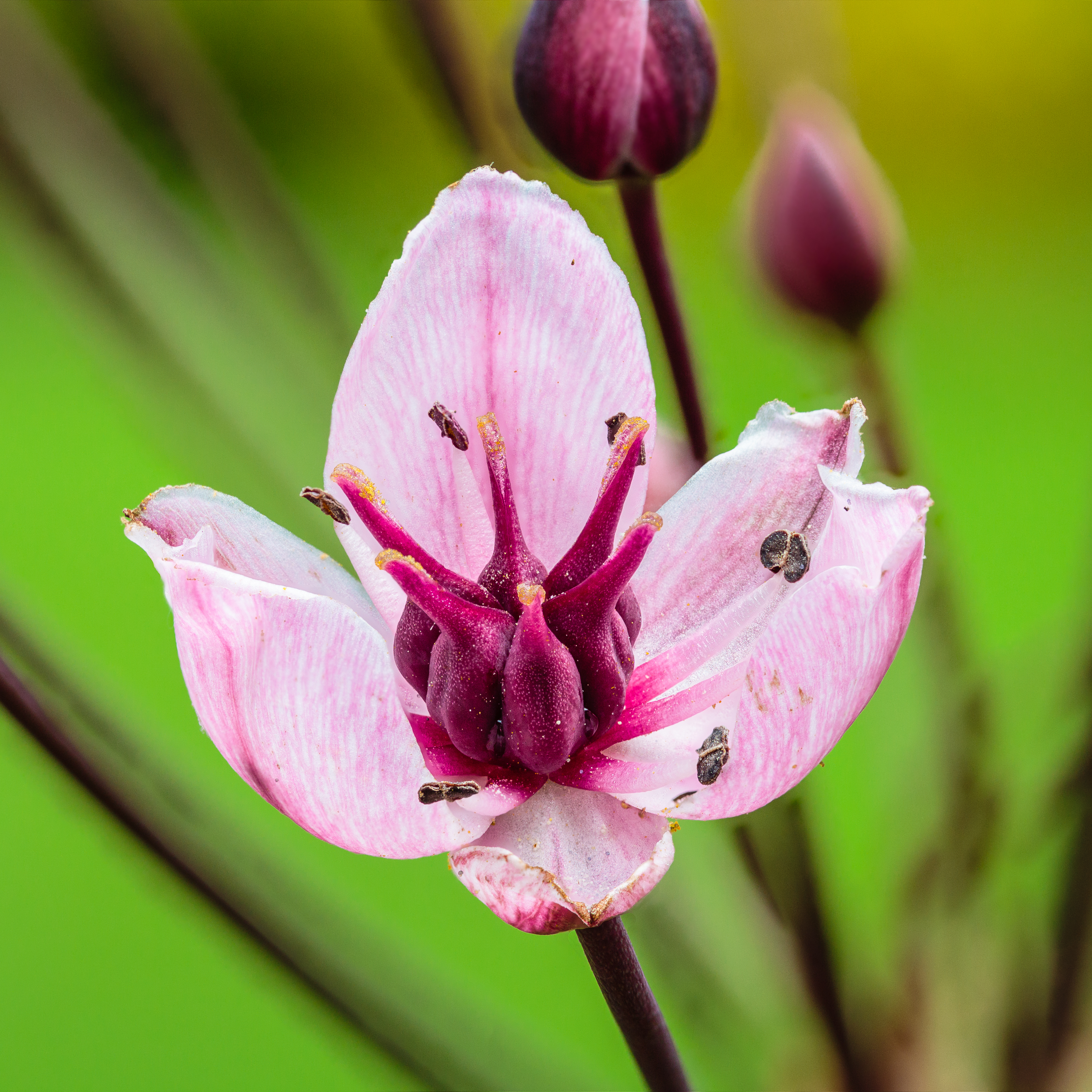
Close-up of flower showing petals nad sepals

Butomus umbellatus is listed as a prohibited species in Michigan, Minnesota, and Illinois, and as a restricted species (but still available) in Wisconsin

| State/Province | First Observed |
|---|---|
| IN | 1952 |
| MI | 1905 |
| MN | 2012 |
| NY | 1929 |
| OH | 1933 |
| ONT | 2011 |
| PA | 1941 |
| QUE | 1897 |
| VT | 1927 |
| WI | 1975 |

== Uses ==
Butomus umbellatus is cultivated as an ornamental waterside plant.

In parts of Russia the rhizomes are used as food.
