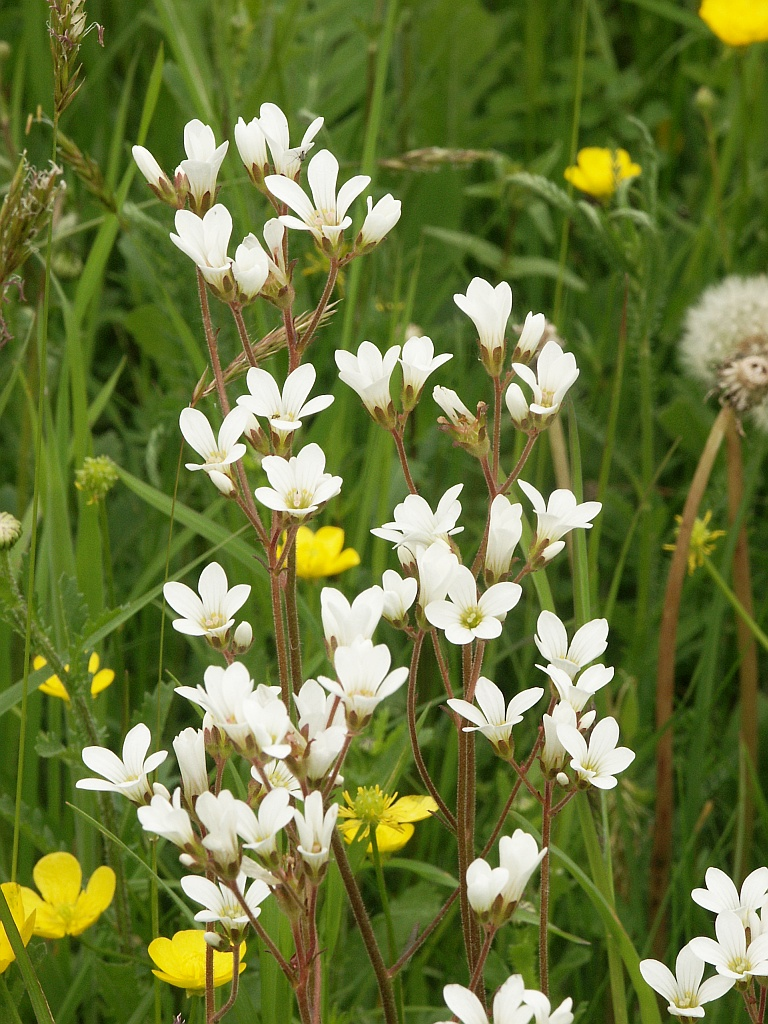

Scientific classification
- Kingdom: Plantae
- Clade: Tracheophytes
- Clade: Angiosperms
- Clade: Eudicots
- Order: Saxifragales
- Family: Saxifragaceae
- Genus: Saxifraga
- Species: S. granulata

Binomial name
- Saxifraga granulata L., 1753

= Saxifraga granulata =

Species of flowering plant

Saxifraga granulata, commonly called meadow saxifrage, is a species of flowering plant in the family Saxifragaceae. It is native to most of Europe and Morocco.

== Taxonomy ==
Saxifraga granulata was first formally described by Linnaeus as part of his original description of Saxifraga in Species Plantarum in 1753. S. granulata is the type species of the genus Saxifraga.
