= Common stork's-bill =

Common stork's-bill is a common name for several plants and may refer to:

- Erodium ciconium, annual herb in the family Geraniaceae
- Erodium cicutarium, herbaceous annual – or in warm climates, biennial – member of the family Geraniaceae
