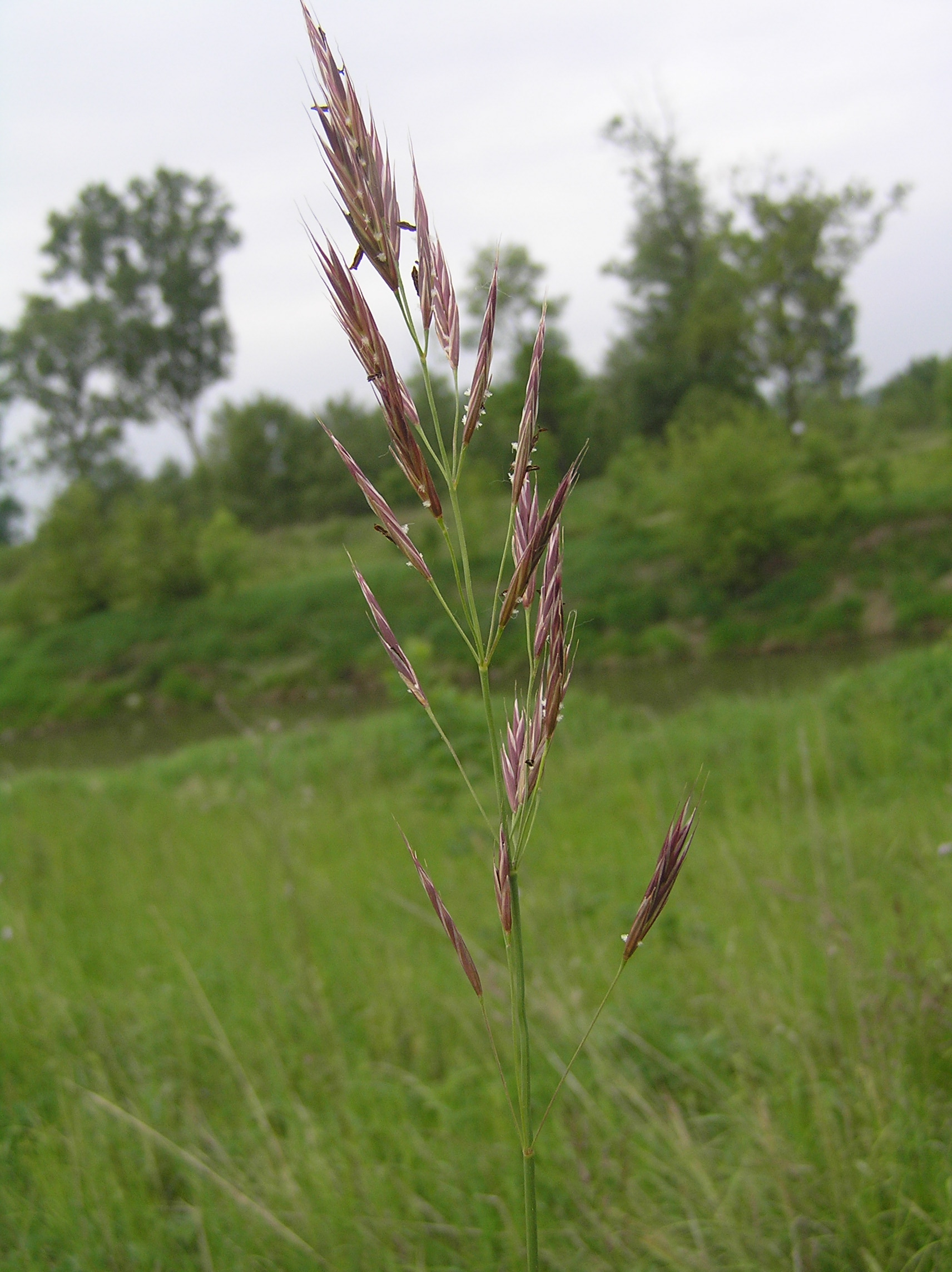

Scientific classification
- Kingdom: Plantae
- Clade: Tracheophytes
- Clade: Angiosperms
- Clade: Monocots
- Clade: Commelinids
- Order: Poales
- Family: Poaceae
- Subfamily: Pooideae
- Genus: Bromus
- Species: B. erectus

Binomial name
- Bromus erectus Huds.

Synonyms
- Bromopsis erecta (Huds.) Fourr.

= Bromus erectus =

Species of grass

Bromus erectus, commonly known as erect brome, upright brome or meadow brome, is a dense, course, tufted perennial grass. It can grow to 120 centimetres (47 in). Like many brome grasses the plant is hairy. The specific epithet erectus is Latin, meaning "erect". The diploid number of the grass is 56.

== Description ==
Bromus erectus is a perennial, tufted grass with basal tufts of cespitose leaves that is nonrhizomatous. The culms grow between 0.6–1.2 m (2 ft 0 in – 3 ft 11 in) in height. The internodes are typically glabrous. The flattened cauline leaves have pubescent or glabrous sheaths. The leaf blades are 10–20 cm (3.9–7.9 in) long and 2–6 mm (0.079–0.236 in) wide. The grass lacks auricles and the ligule is blunt but finely serrated, sometimes with hairy edges. The contracted and ellipsoid panicle is usually upright, rather than nodding, measuring 7–15 cm (2.8–5.9 in) long. The lanceolate spikelets are 1.5–3 cm (0.59–1.18 in) long and have five to twelve flowers. The glumes are acute, with the lower glumes one-nerved and 7–9 mm (0.28–0.35 in) long, and the upper glumes three-nerved and 9–11 mm (0.35–0.43 in) long. The glabrous or slightly scabrous lemmas are prominently nerved and 10–15 mm (0.39–0.59 in) long, with awns 5–6 mm (0.20–0.24 in) long. The anthers are 4–6 mm (0.16–0.24 in) long. B. erectus flowers in June and July.

== Identification ==
Upright brome can be identified by the "camel's eyelashes", or long hairs, along the edges of the leaves.

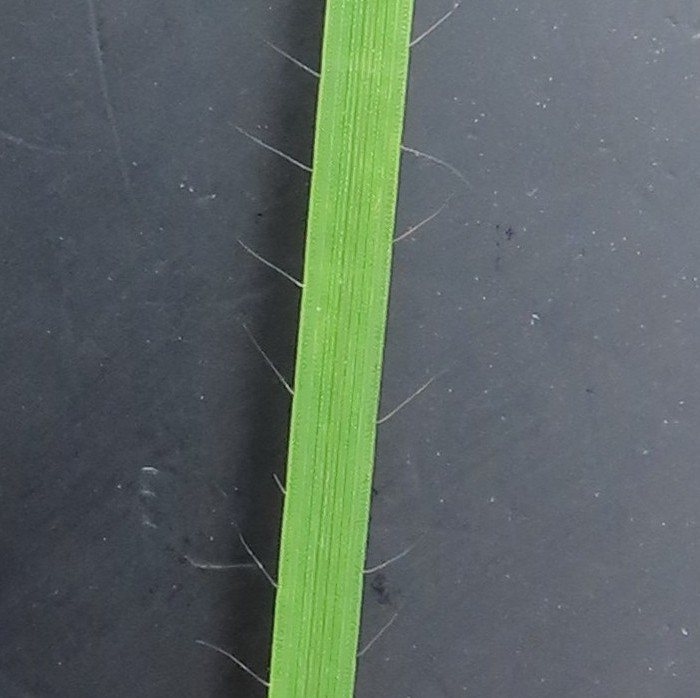
There are long, thin hairs on the edges of the leaf of Upright Brome.

== Range ==
Found on well-drained calcerous soils in disturbed areas, fields, and roadsides, B. erectus is widespread in Europe, South West Asia, North West Africa, and has been introduced into North America.
