= Boulder clay =

Geological deposit of clay

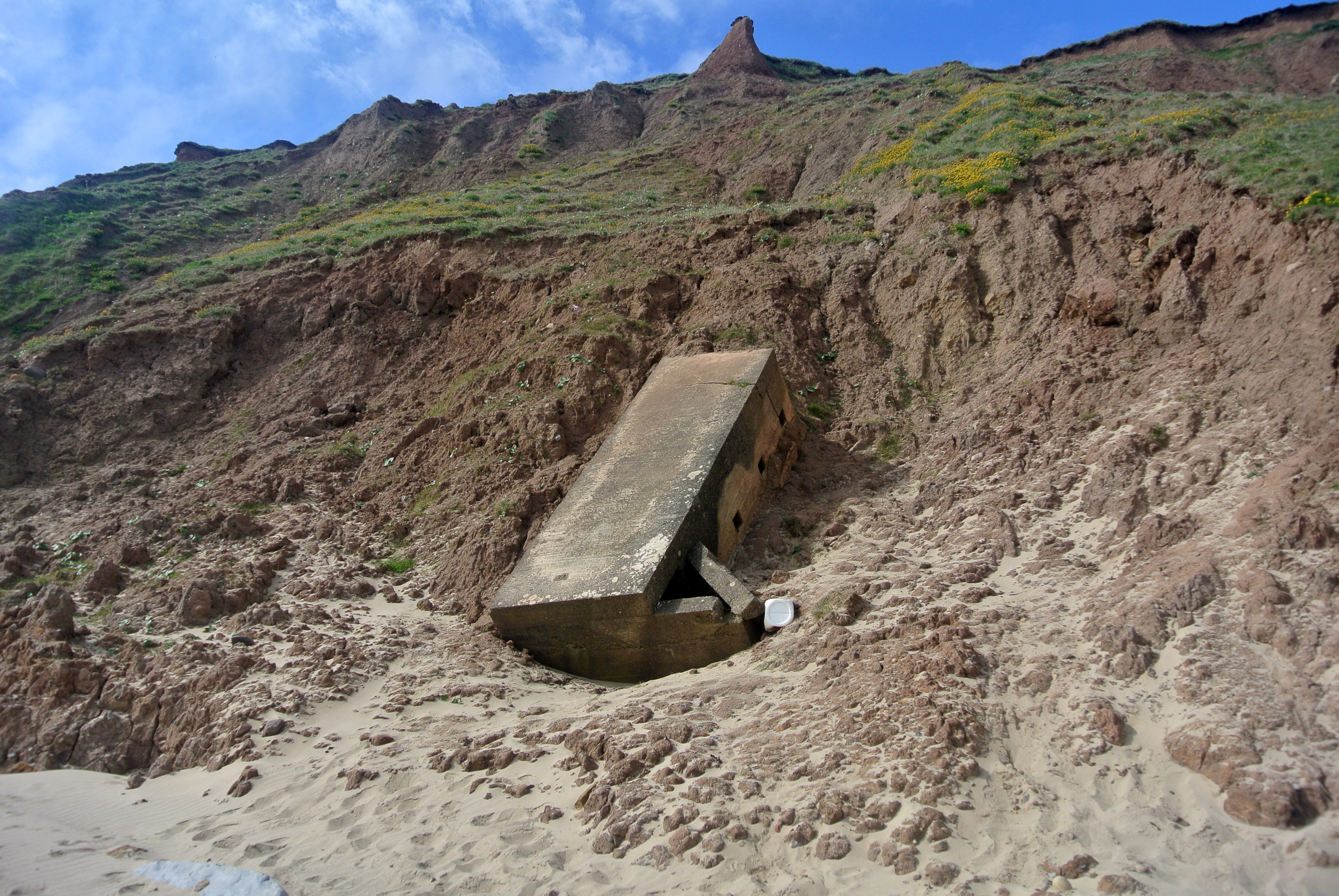
World War II pillbox on eroding boulder clay, Filey Bay, England

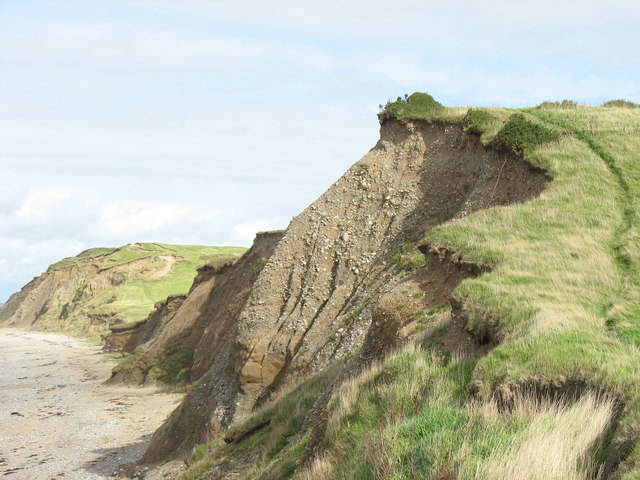
Boulder clay cliffs in Gwynedd with Dinas Dinlle in the background

Boulder clay is an unsorted agglomeration of clastic sediment that is unstratified and structureless and contains gravel of various sizes, shapes, and compositions distributed at random in a fine-grained matrix. The fine-grained matrix consists of stiff, hard, pulverized clay or rock flour. Boulder clay is also known as drift clay; till; and unstratified drift.

The term boulder clay is infrequently used for gravelly sedimentary deposits of nonglacial origin. These deposits include submarine slump and slide deposits along continental margins, lacustrine debris flow deposits consisting of pebbly mudstones, and coarse, poorly sorted, cobbly diamictons associated with the Guangxi karst, China.

== Lithology ==
The gravel content of boulder clay varies from 1 to 99 percent and ranges in size from pebbles to boulders of large dimensions. The size, shape, and composition of these gravels vary according to the distance through which they have travelled and the hardness, structure, and composition of the bedrock source from which they have been plucked.

The cobbles and boulders found in boulder clay often have a distinctive shape, especially in the harder rock types. Their shapes are either inherited from the structure of bedrock source or how it was transported, or combination of both. Cobbles and boulders that have been transported over long distances by glaciers are often roughly triangular or pentagonal in shape with rounded and smoothed edges and smooth, flat soles. Faceted cobbles and boulders are common in boulder clays that accumulated beneath the centers of ice sheets and are relatively rare in boulder clays deposited near the periphery of the ice-sheets.

Cobbles and boulders that occur within boulder clays commonly exhibit striations like those on found on bedrock surfaces eroded and polished by glacial ice. Limestone clasts quite commonly exhibits striations. On a cobble or boulder, striations may be confined to one or more facets. Also, they may ring an entire clast. On particularly large boulders, striations lie typically parallel to its long axis. If the cobble or boulder shifted during transport, striations will crisscross each other.

The overall texture of boulder clay varies with its source. The glacial erosion of sandstones often produces loose and sandy boulder clays. The glacial erosion of granites, gneisses and quartzose schists often results in the formation of stony, coarse and gravelly boulder clay that, in some instances, can be hardly distinguishable from in situ decayed rock. In case of both of these boulder clays, the term clay is misleading and inappropriate. Finally, glacial erosion of limestone, clay or shale results in clayey glacial deposits typical of boulder-clay.

The color of boulder clays varies with the type of bedrock from which it was eroded. For example, within the United Kingdom, dull grey boulder clays are derived from eroded schist; blue boulder clays are derived from eroded Oxford Clay, dark blue or nearly black boulder clays are derived from eroded Carboniferous clay and coal, and red boulder clays are derived from eroded Old Red Sandstone or New Red Sandstone. Like its texture and color, the composition of a boulder clay varies with the composition of the bedrock from which it was eroded.

Boulder-clay is typically tough, compact, tenacious, and over consolidated. These physical properties result from a combination of the fine rock-flour it contains and the weight of the overlying ice while the boulder clay accumulated.

== See also ==
- Diamictite
- Drift (geology)
