= List of crossings of the River Soar =

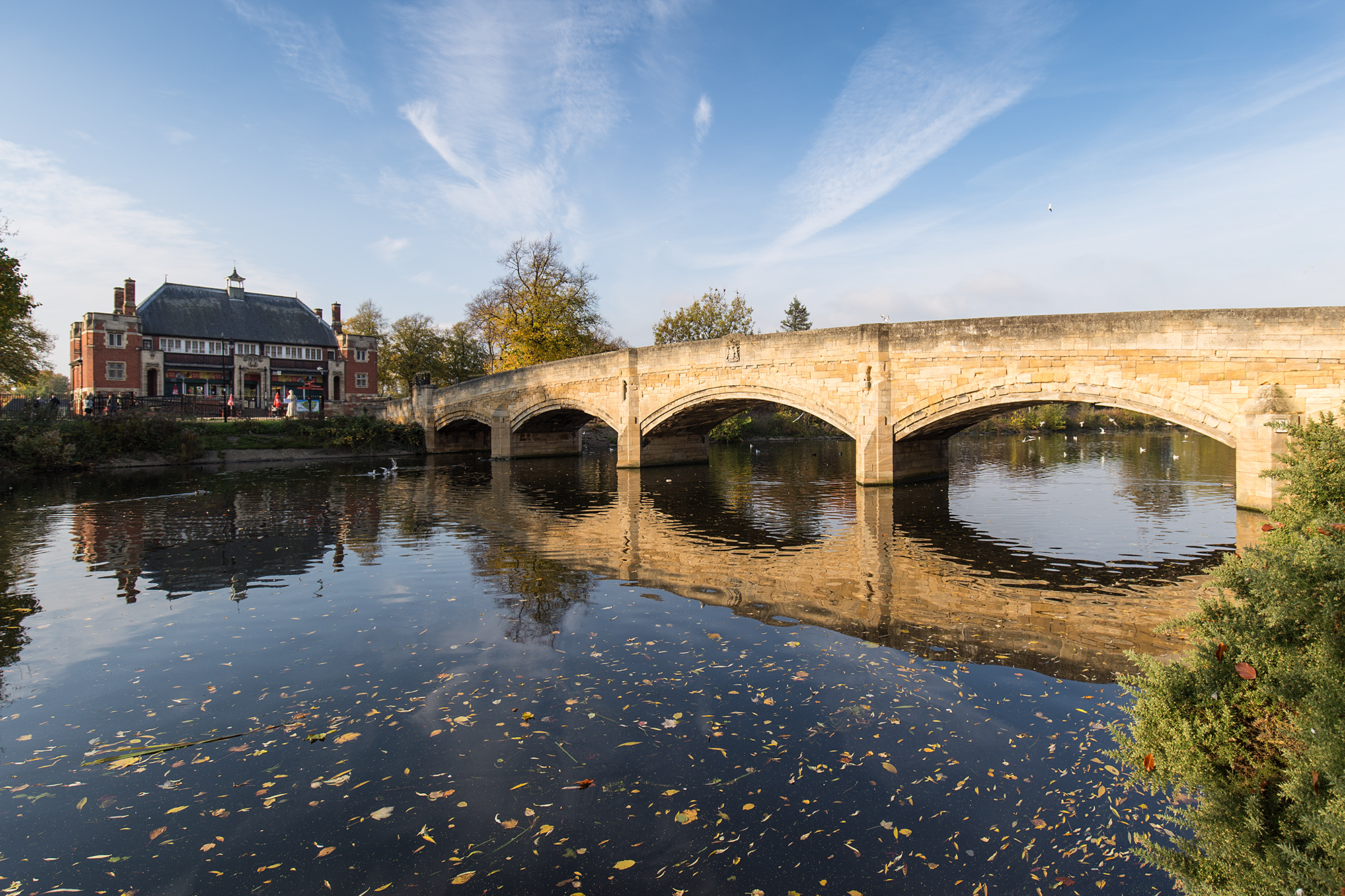
Bridge over the River Soar, Abbey Park, Leicester

This is a list of crossings of the River Soar, the principal river of Leicestershire in the Midlands of England. Listed in the table are those crossings that have been identified downstream of the Soar Brook confluence, near Sharnford, to the last crossing near Ratcliffe-on-Soar upstream of Soar Mouth where the river meets the Trent.

At Aylestone in Leicester the Grand Union Canal meets the Soar, to form the Soar Navigation. Downstream from this point the navigation and river become intertwined with weirs and bypass channels, one prominent section is the Mile Straight constructed for flood alleviation in the 1890s. It has four listed crossings along its length, including Upperton Road, Mill Lane, Newarke, and West Bridge. The current West Bridge built in 1891, replaced an earlier stone bridge with four arches, that once had a bridge chapel. Crossing the Old Soar nearby, is Bow Bridge, although rebuilt in 1863, the earlier medieval bridge was strongly associated with the local folklore surrounding the death of Richard III.

Other notable crossings include the scheduled packhorse bridges at Aylestone and Enderby Mill, with the bridges at Cossington, Barrow, Cotes and Kegworth all being Grade II listed. Near Mountsorrel, a listed red brick bridge from 1860 has been described as “an impressive local landmark.”

== Crossings ==
Key to heritage status
Status	Criteria
I	Grade I listed. Bridge of exceptional interest, sometimes considered to be internationally important
II*	Grade II* listed. Particularly important bridge of more than special interest
II	Grade II listed. Bridge of national importance and special interest
SM	Scheduled Monument. Nationally important archaeological bridge.

River order	Name	Image	From /To Coordinates	Carries	Date	Heritage status	Notes & refs
1	Footbridge		Sharnford; 52.52412°N 1.28196°W	Footpath			Footbridge downstream of Soar Brook confluence.
2	Road Bridge		Sapcote; 52.52461°N 1.28064°W	Main Street			Road to Frolesworth.
3	Stoney Bridge		Sapcote; 52.53219°N 1.25908°W	Fosse Way			First named bridge.
4	Road Bridge		Broughton Astley; 52.54030°N 1.24810°W	B581			Coventry Road.
5	Sutton Hill Bridge		Broughton Astley; 52.54199°N 1.24790°W	B4114			Coventry Road.
6	Sopers Bridge & Footbridge		Croft; 52.54778°N 1.25741°W	Footpath		II	Sopers Bridge is located on an old course of the river.
7	Railway bridge		Croft; 52.55671°N 1.25097°W	Birmingham to Peterborough Line			Stoney Stanton to Croft.
8	Croft Bridge		Croft; 52.55864°N 1.24698°W	Station Road			Modern road bridge.
9	Footbridge		Croft; 52.55835°N 1.24202°W	Footpath			Near Croft Quarry.
10	Langham Bridge		Narborough; 52.56825°N 1.21669°W	Coventry Road			Historic bridging point of Fosse Way.
11	Railway bridge		Narborough; 52.56800°N 1.21168°W	Birmingham to Peterborough Line			Upstream from Narborough station.
12	Station Road Bridge		Littlethorpe; 52.57081°N 1.20342°W	Station Road			Near Narborough Station.
13	M1 Bridge		Narborough; 52.57136°N 1.19342°W	M1 Motorway			Motorway bridge.
14	Railway bridge		Enderby; 52.57592°N 1.18856°W	Birmingham to Peterborough Line			Downstream of M1.
15	Enderby Mill Bridge		Enderby; 52.58069°N 1.18962°W	Footpath	15th century	SM	Scheduled bridge with adjacent footbridge.
16	Enderby Bridge		Enderby; 52.58145°N 1.18858°W	Enderby Rd			Modern road bridge.
17	Soar Valley Way		Enderby; 52.59594°N 1.17007°W	A563			Dual carriageway.
18	Aylestone Packhorse Bridge		Aylestone; 52.60326°N 1.16288°W	Footpath	15th century	II & SM	Scheduled packhorse bridge.
19	Footbridge		Aylestone; 52.60338°N 1.16229°W	Towpath			Crosses Soar where it joins with canal.
20	Footbridge		Aylestone; 52.60383°N 1.16117°W	Grand Central Way			Former Great Central Railway.
21	Freestone Bridge		Aylestone; 52.60466°N 1.15944°W	Braunstone Lane East			Braunstone Lane East.
22	Parsons Bridge		Aylestone; 52.60698°N 1.15359°W	Canal Street			Access road to Aylestone Meadows.
23	Aylestone Mill		Aylestone; 52.60995°N 1.14646°W	Aylestone Mill			Access road to Aylestone Meadows.
24	Access bridge		Aylestone; 52.61101°N 1.14346°W	Access road			Access road to industrial estate.
25	Twelve Arches railway viaduct		Westcotes; 52.61987°N 1.14656°W	Leicester–Burton upon Trent line			Upstream of Freemans Weir.
26	Footbridge across Old Soar		Bede Island; 52.62435°N 1.14354°W	Towpath			Old River Soar - first crossing.
27	Watkin Road Bridge		Bede Island; 52.62534°N 1.14485°W	Access road			Old River Soar.
28	Upperton Road Bridge		Bede Island; 52.62572°N 1.14532°W	Upperton Road			Old River Soar.
29	Great Central Way footbridge		Bede Island; 52.62661°N 1.14641°W	Great Central Way			Former railway bridge over the Old River Soar - a disused bridge is adjacent.
30	Footbridge		Bede Island; 52.62816°N 1.14639°W	Footpath			Old Soar - Modern Footbridge.
31	Western Boulevard		Bede Island; 52.63194°N 1.14426°W	Road			Old Soar, site of demolished Braunstone Gate Bridge.
32	Bow Bridge		Bede Island; 52.63397°N 1.14425°W	A47	1863		Old Soar-St Augustine Road bridge.
33	Upperton Road Bridge		Mile Straight; 52.62562°N 1.14310°W	Upperton Road	1890	II	One of four listed bridges on the Mile Straight.
34	Swan Bridge		Mile Straight; 52.62604°N 1.14302°W	Upperton Road			109A Eastbound Modern bridge.
35	Mill Lane bridge		Mile Straight; 52.62875°N 1.14260°W	Mill Lane	1890	II	One of four listed bridges on the Mile Straight.
36	Newarke Bridge		Mile Straight; 52.63110°N 1.14226°W	The Newarke	1898	II	One of four listed bridges on the Mile Straight.
37	Footbridge		Mile Straight; 52.63262°N 1.14205°W	Footpath			Bridge 2A.
38	West Bridge		Mile Straight; 52.63362°N 1.14219°W	A47	1891	II	Historic bridging point, one of four listed bridges on the Mile Straight.
39	West Bridge		Mile Straight; 52.63380°N 1.14239°W	A47			Eastbound Modern.
40	Footbridge		Westcotes; 52.63761°N 1.14498°W	Footpath			Evans Weir.
41	Soar Lane bridge		Westcotes; 52.63821°N 1.14546°W	Soar Lane			West side of Soar island.
42	Footbridge		Soar Island; 52.63979°N 1.14566°W	Towpath			Between Soar and Frog Island.
43	North Bridge		Frog Island; 52.64293°N 1.14414°W	A50			Links Woodgate to Frog Island.
44	St Margarets Way		Frog Island; 52.64421°N 1.14053°W	A6			Dual bridges.
45	Footbridge		Abbey Park; 52.64456°N 1.13973°W	Footpath			Concrete footbridge.
46	Abbey Park Bridge		Abbey Park; 52.64688°N 1.13685°W	Footpath			Ornamental footbridge.
47	Abbey Corner Bridge		Abbey Park; 52.64904°N 1.13423°W	Abbey Park Road	1878	II	Abbey Park Road Bridge.
48	Abbey Meadows footbridge		Abbey Meadows; 52.65265°N 1.13237°W	Footpath	2013		Wolsey Point to National Space Centre
49	Holden Street footbridge		Belgrave; 52.65551°N 1.12563°W	Footpath	1985		Refurbished in 2015.
50	Belgrave Bridge		Belgrave; 52.66082°N 1.12833°W	Thurcaston Road	Probable 15th century	II	Thurcaston Road Bridge (Old Bridge).
51	New Bridge		Belgrave; 52.66297°N 1.12685°W	Loughborough Road	1834	II	Loughborough Road Bridge.
52	Watermead Bridge		Rushey Mead; 52.66664°N 1.11827°W	Watermead Way			A563.
53	Birstall weir footbridge		Rushey Mead; 52.67210°N 1.11430°W	Towpath			Curved weir and footbridge.
54	Footbridge		Birstall; 52.67265°N 1.11380°W	Footpath			Near Birstall Lock.
55	Birstall Lock footbridge		Birstall; 52.67378°N 1.11620°W	Footpath			One of a number of bridges at Birstall Lock.
56	Birstall Lock footbridge		Birstall; 52.67381°N 1.11596°W	Footpath			Bridge 14c.
57	Footbridge		Birstall; 52.67459°N 1.11690°W	Towpath			White Horse Lane.
58	Footbridge		Watermead Country Park; 52.67865°N 1.10240°W	Towpath			Bridge 16B, Thurmaston Weir.
59	Footbridge		Watermead Country Park; 52.67968°N 1.10195°W	Towpath			Downstream of Thurmaston Lock.
60	Footbridge		Watermead Country Park; 52.68362°N 1.10116°W	Towpath			Crosses Soar where it splits with canal.
61	Footbridge		Watermead Country Park; 52.68564°N 1.10588°W	Footpath			King Lears Lake.
62	Pochin Bridge		Wanlip; 52.69668°N 1.10837°W	A46			Leicester Western Bypass.
63	Cossington footbridge		Cossington; 52.70954°N 1.12005°W	Towpath			Above Cossington Lock.
64	Cossington Bridge		Cossington; 52.71130°N 1.12090°W	Cossington Lane	c. 1800	II	Listed bridge.
65	Sileby Lock footbridges		Sileby; 52.72724°N 1.12400°W	Towpath			Series of three footbridges.
66	Sileby Mill footbridge		Sileby; 52.72832°N 1.12547°W	Towpath			Sileby Mill.
67	A6 bridge		Mountsorrel; 52.73220°N 1.13450°W	A6			One of four A6 crossings.
68	Sileby Lane bridge		Mountsorrel; 52.73119°N 1.14021°W	Sileby Lane			East of Mountsorrel.
69	Mountsorrel mineral railway bridge		Mountsorrel; 52.73294°N 1.14292°W	Conveyor	1860	II	1860 bridge - Brick bridge.
70	Mountsorrel turnover Bridge 26		Mountsorrel; 52.73541°N 1.14451°W	Towpath			Carries towpath from one bank to the other.
71	A6 bridge		Mountsorrel; 52.73934°N 1.14263°W	A6			One of four A6 crossings.
72	Footbridge		Barrow upon Soar; 52.74573°N 1.14457°W	Towpath			Crosses over weir.
73	Footbridge		Barrow upon Soar; 52.74367°N 1.14652°W	Footpath			Between Barrow and A6.
74	A6 bridge		Barrow upon Soar; 52.74240°N 1.14790°W	A6			One of four A6 crossings.
75	A6 bridge		Quorn; 52.74830°N 1.15861°W	A6			One of four A6 crossings.
76	Mill Lane bridge		Barrow upon Soar; 52.74590°N 1.14733°W	Mill Lane			Navigation Inn.
77	Barrow Lock bdg		Barrow upon Soar; 52.74981°N 1.15265°W	Proctors Park Road			Minor road.
78	Barrow Road Bridge		Barrow upon Soar; 52.75081°N 1.15303°W	Bridge Street	1845	II	Listed bridge.
79	Pillings Lock rail bdg		Barrow upon Soar; 52.75970°N 1.16350°W	Midland Main Line			Railway bridge.
80	Cotes Bridge		Cotes; 52.78026°N 1.18025°W	A60	18th century	II	Nottingham Road.
81	Footbridge		Cotes; 52.78939°N 1.19466°W	Footpath			One of two footbridges at this point.
82	Footbridge		Cotes; 52.78857°N 1.19518°W	Footpath			One of two footbridges at this point.
83	Stanford Viaduct		Stanford on Soar; 52.79030°N 1.19740°W	Great Central Railway (heritage railway)	1899		Skewed central arches.
84	Meadow Lane Bridge		Stanford on Soar; 52.79063°N 1.19849°W	Meadow Lane			Minor road.
85	Railway bridge		Stanford on Soar; 52.79370°N 1.21650°W	Midland Main Line			Major rail bridge.
86	Zouch footbridges		Zouch; 52.80618°N 1.24575°W	Footpath			A series of three footbridges over the weirs at Zouch.
87	Zouch Bridge		Zouch; 52.80448°N 1.25606°W	A6006			County Bridge, due for replacement.
88	Kegworth Bridge		Kegworth; 52.84034°N 1.26906°W	Station Road	1785	II	Grade II bridge, widened in 1937.
89	Kegworth footbridge		Kegworth; 52.84183°N 1.26706°W	Towpath			Carries towpath across the river.
90	A453 Bridge		Ratcliffe-on-Soar; 52.85784°N 1.26459°W	A453			Remembrance Way.
91	Ratcliffe on Soar Ford		Ratcliffe-on-Soar; 52.85903°N 1.26538°W	Bridleway			Ford across the Soar.
92	Soar Mouth		Ratcliffe-on-Soar; 52.87313°N 1.26829°W	Trent Lock ferry			In the 1900s a ferry crossed from the Soar to Trent Lock at the Trent confluence, carrying horses and passengers.

== Bibliography ==
- Smith (1996). Leicester A-Z Street Atlas. Geographers A-Z Map Company Ltd. ISBN 9780850393408.
