= Leicester Rowing Club =

British rowing club

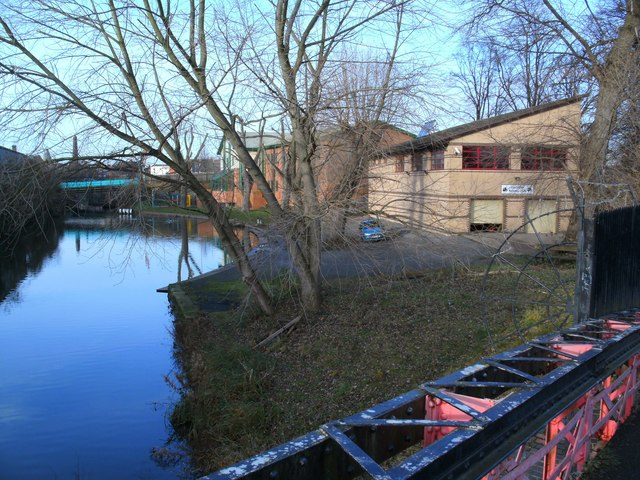

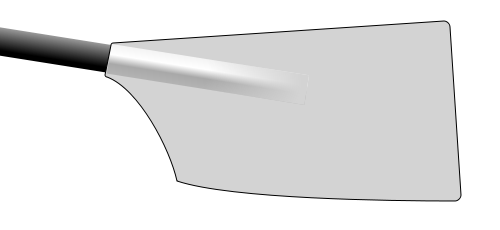
- Location: Leicester, England
- Coordinates: 52.624982°N 1.143741°W
- Home water: River Soar
- Founded: 1882; 144 years ago
- Membership: 100 (approx)
- Affiliations: British Rowing boat code - LER
- Website: leicester-rowing.co.uk

Events
- Leicester Regatta

Leicester Rowing Club is a rowing and sculling club in Leicester, England. The club was formed in 1882 and represents the City of Leicester in Regatta and Head Races around Great Britain and Worldwide. The club insignia is based on the mythical Wyvern and rowers compete in the club's colours of black and white with pure white blades.

== History ==
The club was founded in 1882 following an amalgamation of three smaller clubs. Based on the canal stretch in Belgrave and captained by Mr. WG Linnell, the club would represent the City in Regatta competitions. The original 1882 boathouse was located in polluted waters which resulted in a move to a boathouse at Hawley's Dye works on Frog Island.

On 10 February 1884, the club rowed in the grand four-oared supper race. The Leicester Regatta held on the River Soar course ended in Abbey Park and was a feature of the annual Abbey Park Flower Show.

On 28 July 1906, a new wooden boat house at the bottom of Filbert Street, opposite the Bede Island Meadows baths was constructed at the cost of £250. During 1940 the club moved to its present site on the southern tip of Bede Island due to Leicester power station acquiring the land. In 1962 a new boathouse was constructed.

In 1970 the club's first women's crew represented LRC at open regattas. Liz Lorrimer was the clubs first female rower.

On 23 November 1996, a new clubhouse (which also houses the fleet of De Montfort University Rowing Club and University of Leicester Boat Club) was opened by Peter Haining, following a grant from the National Lottery.

The club won three national titles at the 2025 British Rowing Club Championships.

== Leicester Regatta and racing ==
The Leicester Regatta is held annually at the start of the regatta season. The event is known in the rowing community as the "Henley of the East Midlands". The Club competes at Head Races and Regattas all year round.

== Honours ==
=== National champions ===
| Year | Winning crew/s |
|---|---|
| 2009 | Open J18 1x, Open J18 4x |
| 2018 | W J16 1x |
| 2024 | W club 2- |
| 2025 | Open club 2-, W club 1x, W club 2x |
