= Soar Valley =

Valley in Leicestershire and Nottinghamshire, England

Coordinates: 52.74°N 1.14°W

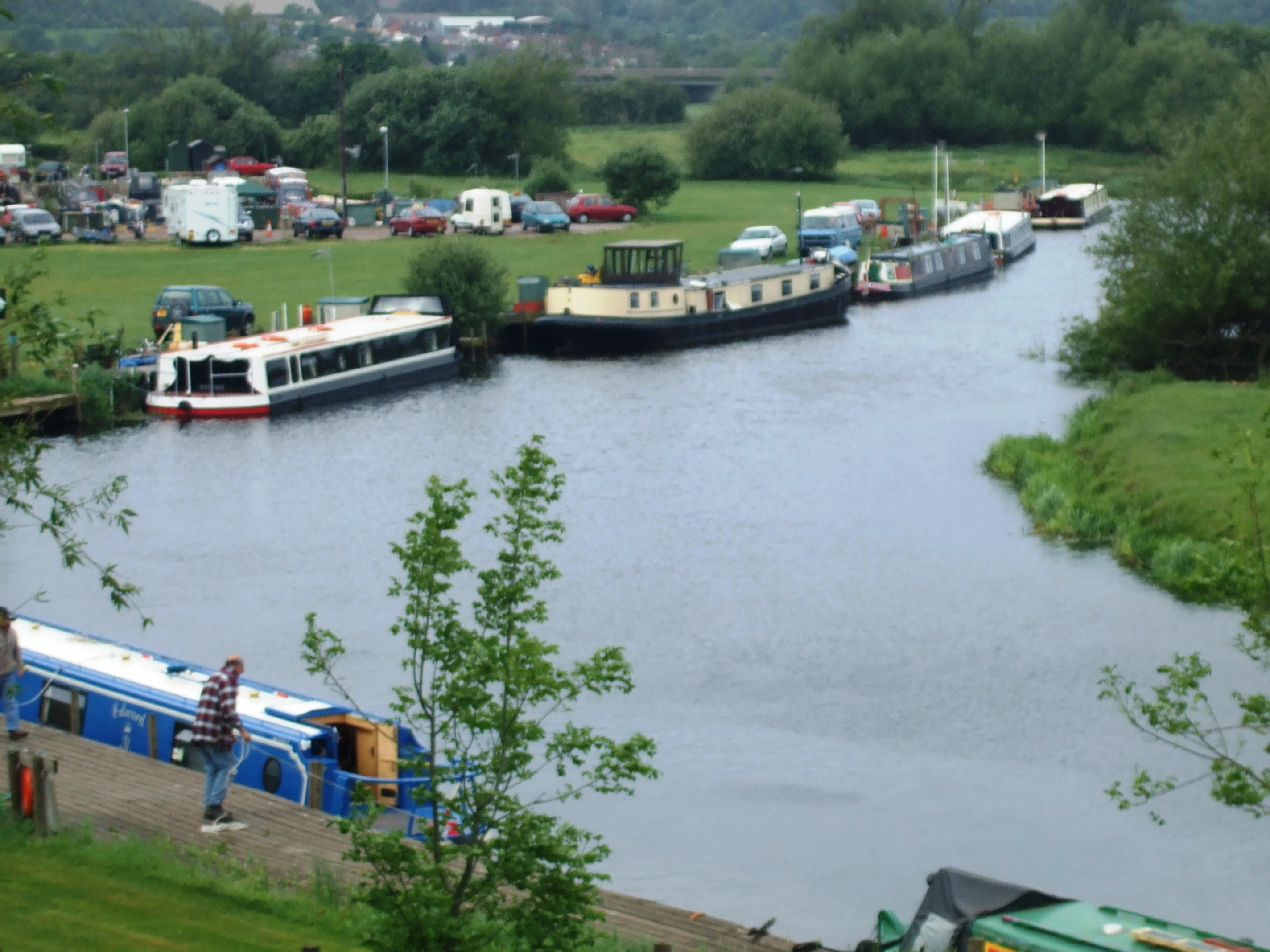
Soar valley between Barrow upon Soar and Mountsorrel

The Soar Valley is a river valley following the course of the River Soar in Leicestershire and Nottinghamshire, in the East Midlands of England. Part of the Drainage basin of the River Trent stretching from south of Leicester to Trent Lock, the valley is a major geographical feature of Leicester City Centre, Greater Leicester, Loughborough, and the wider county of Leicestershire of which it forms part of the northern boundary with Nottinghamshire. The valley is home to a section of the M1 motorway, a large section of the Great Central Railway, a lengthy stretch of the Grand Union Canal, the Leicester City Ground, Abbey Park, the Abbey Pumping Station, and the National Space Centre.

Soar Valley is also the name of an electoral ward of Rushcliffe Borough Council in south Nottinghamshire.

== Settlements ==
The valley begins around the area where the Soar meets the River Sence near Enderby and Whetstone through the villages of Narborough, Blaby, and Glen Parva south of Leicester. In Leicester city the valley passes through the settlements of Braunstone, Aylestone, and the floodplains of Aylestone Meadows, past Westcotes, Bede Island and Frog Island skirting Leicester City Centre to the west, on through the villages of Quorn, Mountsorrel, Barrow upon Soar, Birstall, Rothley and Sileby and a number of smaller communities all on or near the River Soar as it flows from Leicester to Loughborough in Leicestershire. The area edges onto Charnwood Forest and the only double tracked preserved main railway line in Britain, the Great Central Railway forms a spine through the area.

== Ward and electoral district ==
Downstream from Stanford on Soar the River Soar forms the boundary with Nottinghamshire and in that county Soar Valley is an electoral district for purposes of electing a councillor to Nottinghamshire County Council. The most recent election was in 2009 when Linda Sykes, of the Conservative party, won the seat. For the election of a councillor to Rushcliffe Borough Council, there is a Soar Valley ward, which covers a smaller area than the electoral district of the same name, and consists of the three parishes of Sutton Bonington, Kingston on Soar and Ratcliffe on Soar. The most recent election was in 2007 when Terry Holt, of the Liberal Democrats, won the seat.

== See also ==
- Soar Valley College
