= Aylestone Meadows =

Nature reserve in Leicester, England

Coordinates: 52.605°N 1.160°W

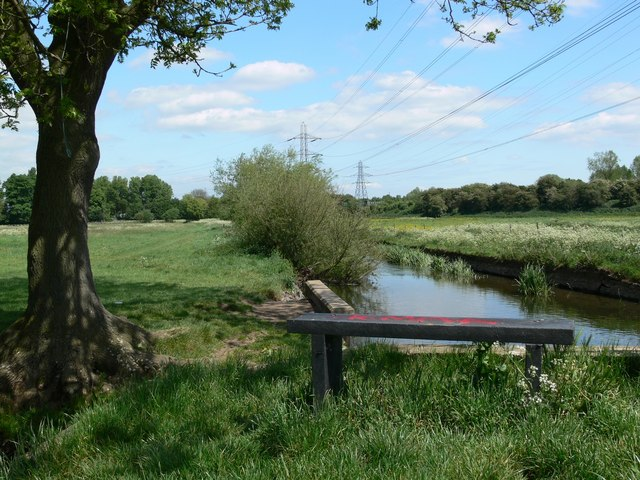
- Interactive map of Aylestone Meadows
- Type: Local Nature Reserve
- Location: Leicester
- OS grid: SK 571 015
- Area: 8.8 hectares (22 acres)
- Manager: Leicester City Council

Aylestone Meadows is an 8.8-hectare (22-acre) Local Nature Reserve in Leicester, England, United Kingdom. It is owned and managed by Leicester City Council.

It is Leicester's largest nature reserve situated on the floodplains of the River Soar and River Biam along with several locks of the Grand Union Canal. It has a high wildlife conservation value, and has trails that are popular venue with hikers, families on outings, dog walkers and cyclists.

A patchwork of flood meadows, woodland and wetlands 1.6 miles (2.6 km) from the city centre, these habitats host many rare and common flora and fauna.

A medieval packhorse bridge provides evidence of trade and previous settlement. The area frequently floods, resulting in fertile land and good grazing areas, and so a settlement grew from prehistoric times to become the village of Aylestone. The construction of the Packhorse Bridge from local granite enabled transportation of goods across an area prone to flooding and includes several passing areas.

== Geography ==
Following the Last Glacial Period, the Bytham River was diverted and the former bed became the Soar Valley. Now canalised through the city centre, the area represents the upstream remnant of the flood plain that once stretched to the River Trent.

In July 2019, a landscaping project began in the northern section of the park with the primary aim of restoring the flood-relieving marsh that has been lost over time. The scheme is expected to last through 2020.

Neighboring areas include[Aylestone and Aylestone Park to the east, Westcotes and the city centre to the north and Braunstone Park & Rowley Fields to the west. The Grand Union Canal and the former Great Central Railway traverse the park along with one public road, Middleton Street/Braunstone Lane East.
