= Cossington Gate railway station =

Former railway station in Leicestershire, England

Coordinates: 52.7172°N 1.0978°W

Cossington Gate

General information
- Location: Cossington, Borough of Charnwood; England

Other information
- Status: Disused

History
- Original company: Midland Counties Railway

Key dates
- 1 December 1845: Station opened
- 29 September 1873: Closed
Location

Cossington Gate railway station was a small station serving Cossington village in Leicestershire.

It served the Midland Counties Railway, built in 1840, which shortly joined the North Midland Railway and the Birmingham and Derby Junction Railway to form the Midland Railway.

The station was associated with a level crossing - hence Cossington Gate. Station buildings were provided in 1846 looked after by the crossing keeper.

However, when the lines were quadrupled in 1873, the crossing was replaced by a bridge and the station closed.
