= Braunstone Gate Bridge =

Bowstring Bridge
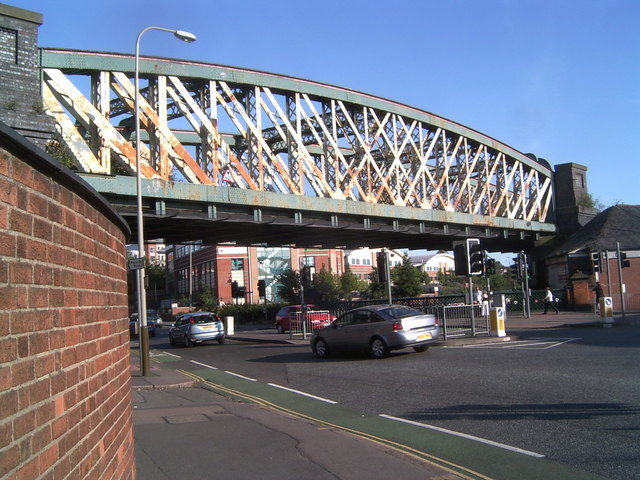
- Braunstone Gate Bridge from the west showing lattice girders in 2005
- Coordinates: 52°37′54.2″N 1°08′38.7″W
- Carries: Great Central Railway (1899–1969); Great Central Way (until 1997)
- Crosses: River Soar and Western Boulevard, Leicester
- Locale: Braunstone Gate
- Official name: Braunstone Gate Bridge
- Maintained by: Leicester City Council
- ID number: 1041

Characteristics
- Design: Bowstring lattice girder bridge
- Material: Steel
- No. of spans: 1
- Clearance below: 4.80 metres (15.7 ft)

History
- Opened: 1898
- Closed: 2009

Location
- Interactive map of Bowstring Bridge

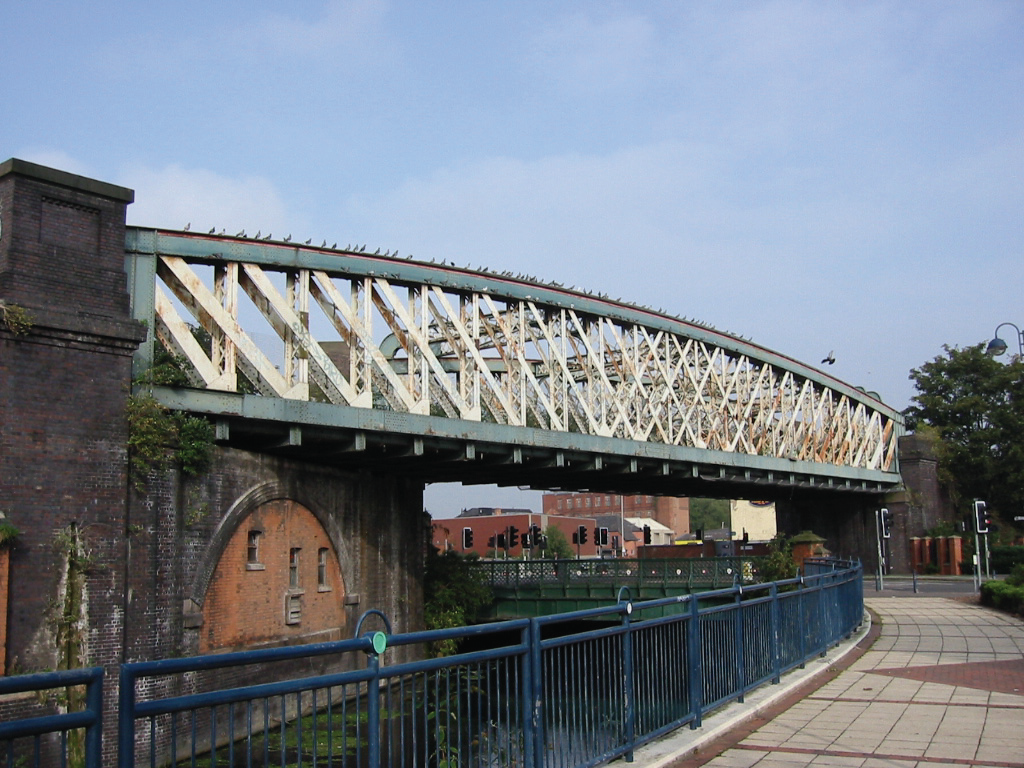
The longer east side of the bridge. The River Soar can be seen here, passing under both the railway and Western Boulevard.

The Braunstone Gate Bridge (also known as the Bowstring Bridge) was a former railway bridge carrying the Great Central Railway, and later a public footpath and cycleway, over Western Boulevard and the River Soar in Leicester, England. The bridge had been in a poor state of repair following years of neglect by the local council and it was demolished to facilitate developments for De Montfort University. The Council claimed that the costs of restoration were prohibitive.

== History ==
The Great Central Railway, which opened on 15 March 1899, was the last main line to be built linking the north of England with London, and crossed Leicester on a Staffordshire blue brick viaduct, over a mile and a half long and comprising 97 brick arches and 16 fine girder bridges of differing designs and dimensions, spanning various thoroughfares, the River Soar and its associated canal. This complex and costly structure began to the north of the River Soar and included two impressive bowstring lattice girder bridges. The first in Northgate Street was demolished in 1981 but the larger second, spanning Braunstone Gate, remained for a further 28 years. Known locally as the "Bowstring Bridge", it contained steel lattice girders of 178 feet 3 inches (54.33 metres) on the east side and 136 feet (41 metres) on the west, both reaching a maximum depth of 19 feet (5.8 metres) in their respective centres. The total weight of the bridge was in excess of 400 tons (407 tonnes). The bridge was described as "unique" from an engineering point of view as the main supports on either side were not parallel, meaning that the two supporting girders had to be of different lengths. The bridge was built by Henry Lovatt of Wolverhampton and was one of the last surviving girder structures from the Great Central's London Extension.

Following the closure of this section of the Great Central on 5 May 1969, much of the railway infrastructure in Leicester was demolished. A surviving length of viaduct from Duns Lane to Glen Parva, including the Bowstring Bridge, was purchased by Leicester City Council in the 1970s for a token payment. The Council subsequently received a Manpower Services Commission grant to engage craftsmen to supervise young people painting the bridge in green and cream colours. The bridge, viaduct and land nearby, including the Pump and Tap pub, were proposed to be sold to De Montfort University whose university campus adjoined the site of the Bowstring Bridge. The bridge was used to carry the Great Central Way, a footpath and cycleway following part of the disused railway line, until 1997 when the demolition of the adjoining Kirby & West dairy forced the cycleway on to the road. The section of the viaduct north of the site (including the Bowstring Bridge) went unmaintained and subsequently became derelict.

In 2002, the Secretary of State for Culture, Media and Sport refused an application to list the bridge as a monument to the city's industrial heritage.

== Demolition ==
=== De Montfort University redevelopment ===
In 2005, Leicester City Council proposed to demolish the bridge to allow De Montfort University to expand its John Sandford sports hall and build a swimming pool in a £6 million development. The Council claimed that the bridge had to be removed as a report revealed that it could barely support its own weight and would not last another year without major repairs. According to the report, the then 108-year-old bridge was "approaching the end of a normal life span of 120 years" and could have lasted "long into the future if only a pro-active maintenance strategy had been in place. Unfortunately, lack of funding and the demise of this section of the railway are instrumental in the extremely poor condition of the structure components. The bridge, which once carried a railway, can only carry its own weight". The report estimated the costs of restoration at between £250,000 and £270,000.

=== Temporary reprieve ===
The bridge had a last-minute reprieve in July 2005 when, just before a meeting at which councillors were about to vote on its demolition, an email was sent to them by Richard Tilden-Smith of the heritage Great Central Railway urging them to postpone a decision until experts could examine the state of the bridge. He indicated that, if the bridge were saved, it might still be possible to extend his organisation's operations through Leicester, with funding possibly coming from the Heritage Lottery Fund. The cabinet agreed to give the bridge more time. Two weeks later, the heritage railway pulled out of talks with the council, stating that the restoration works would be too expensive and would not fit in with the council's timetable for the area.

=== Application to stop-up highway ===
In October 2005, Leicester City Council released an engineer's report indicating that the bridge could only support its own weight and would need £775,000 to keep it intact over the next three years. Full restoration would cost £2.5 million according to the report. The Council planned to demolish the bridge by Summer 2006 but had to revise its plans once it was discovered that, as the bridge was still classed as a public highway which used to carry the Great Central Way footpath, a formal stopping-up order extinguishing the highway would have to be obtained. This process would take up to a year. By March 2008 the order had still not yet been granted and considerable local opposition against the plans was manifesting itself on the internet with more than 2,500 people joining a campaign on the Facebook website, and a further 1,200 signing a petition on the 10 Downing Street website.

The court hearing for the stopping-up order took place 4 June 2008 at Leicester Magistrates' Court. Representatives from the Ramblers Association, the Victorian Society, the Footpath Association, Leicester Civic Society and Leicestershire Industrial History Society were present. The Council applied for the order under Section 116 of the Highways Act 1980 to have 410 metres (450 yards) of the bridge and viaduct closed, thereby avoiding the public enquiry that would have been necessary if Section 118 (also concerned with closure) had been used. The hearing was adjourned until 17 June when the application was due to be heard by a district judge and a date set for a full hearing of the case. Following a three-day hearing, District Judge John Stobart granted the council's application on 9 October 2008. Six local organisations and 6,000 petitioners had challenged the council's decision. A local woman was subsequently arrested after staging a 12-hour occupation protest on the bridge.

=== Demolition ===
In a meeting adjourned in exclusion of the public on 3 August 2009, Leicester City Council made the decision to knock down the bowstring bridge and to sell the remaining length of viaduct on Duns Lane as well as the adjacent land to De Montfort University for an initial £1 fee. The council would then demolish the remaining viaduct and adjoining Pump and Tap pub to make way for the university's sports centre. As part of the deal, the university would make a second payment at a later date of £250,000 followed by a final payment of £500,000. The demolition of the bridge at a reported cost of £500,000 was scheduled by Leicester City Council for 21 September 2009. Leicester Civic Society applied to English Heritage to have the structure listed, but this was rejected on the basis that the bridge was "not old enough or sufficiently innovative to justify preservation".

Contractors began by blocking off Western Boulevard with steel fencing on 5 October 2009, and actual demolition began during the following week. The bridge itself had been entirely removed by the beginning of December. The nearby Pump and Tap pub closed its doors for the last time on 24 November 2009, and demolition began almost immediately. The section of viaduct to the north of the former bridge, behind the pub's site, was demolished in December 2010 – January 2011. Work on the new sports hall and swimming pool development started in April 2011.

On 25 September 2010 Leicester Civic Society unveiled a memorial plaque to the former bridge on the facade of a nearby building (the Bowstring Bar).

Before, during and after demolition
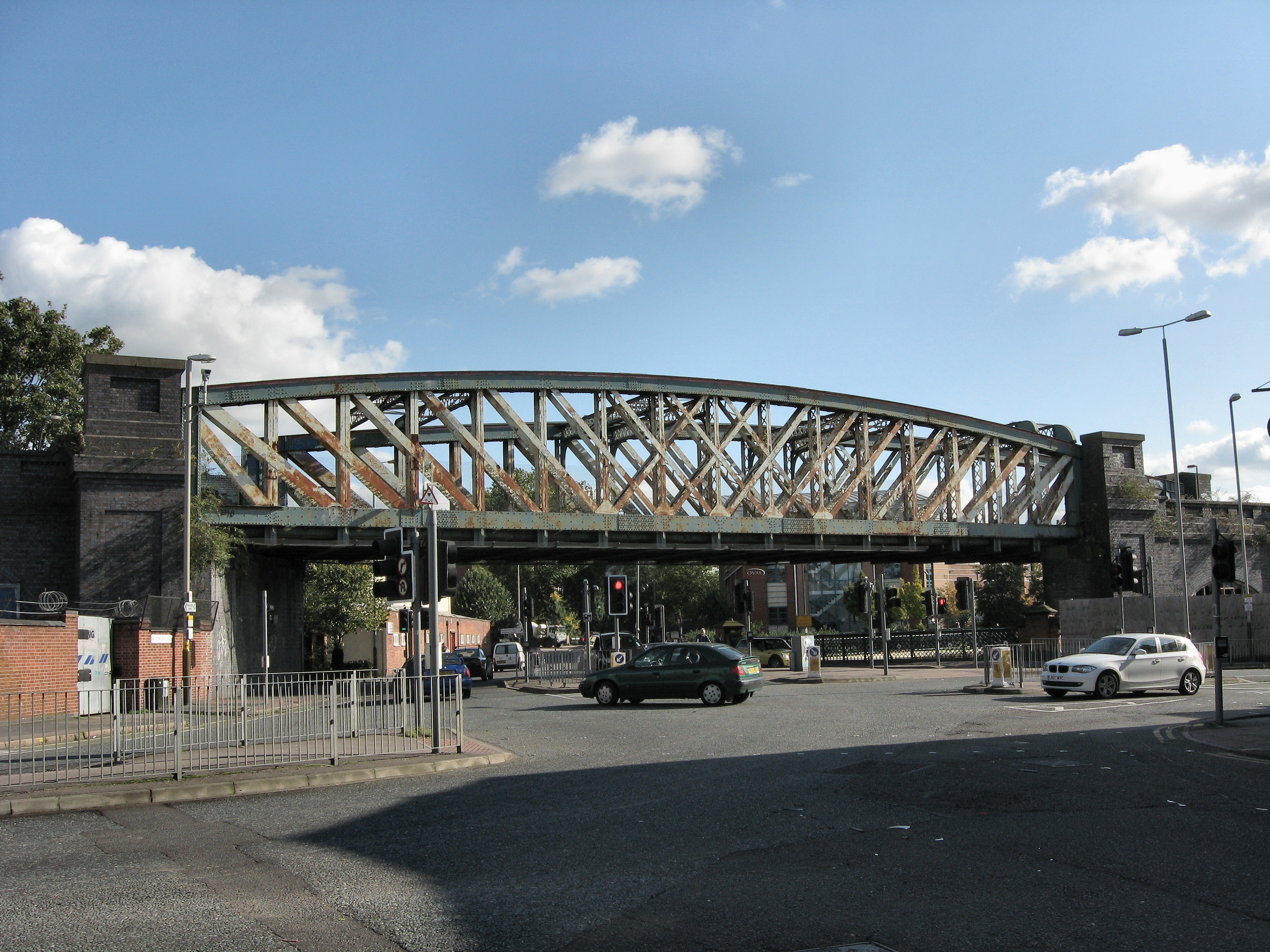
Braunstone Gate Bridge – the west side on 8 October 2008

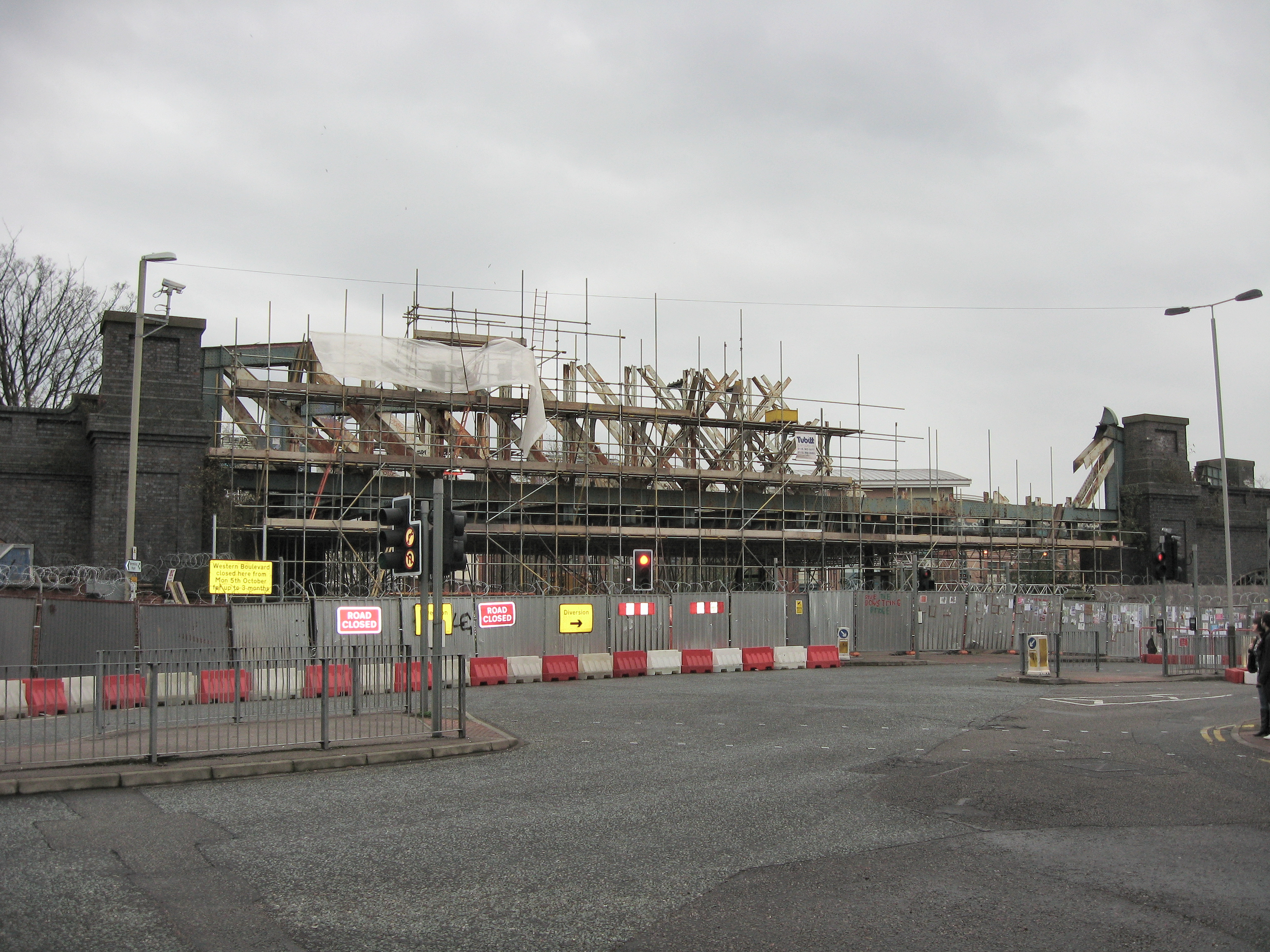
The same scene on 21 November 2009 with demolition well underway

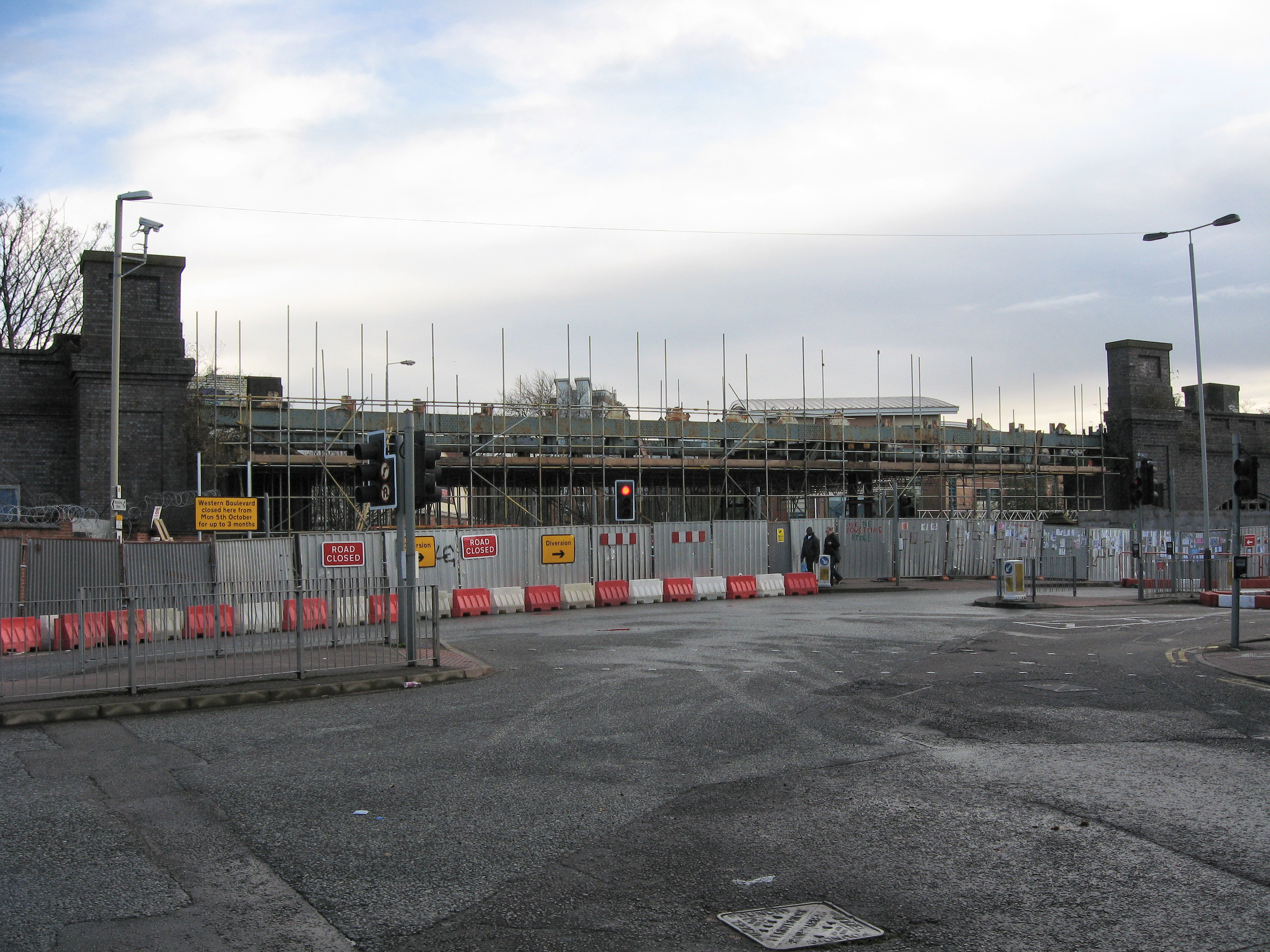
The same scene again on 29 November

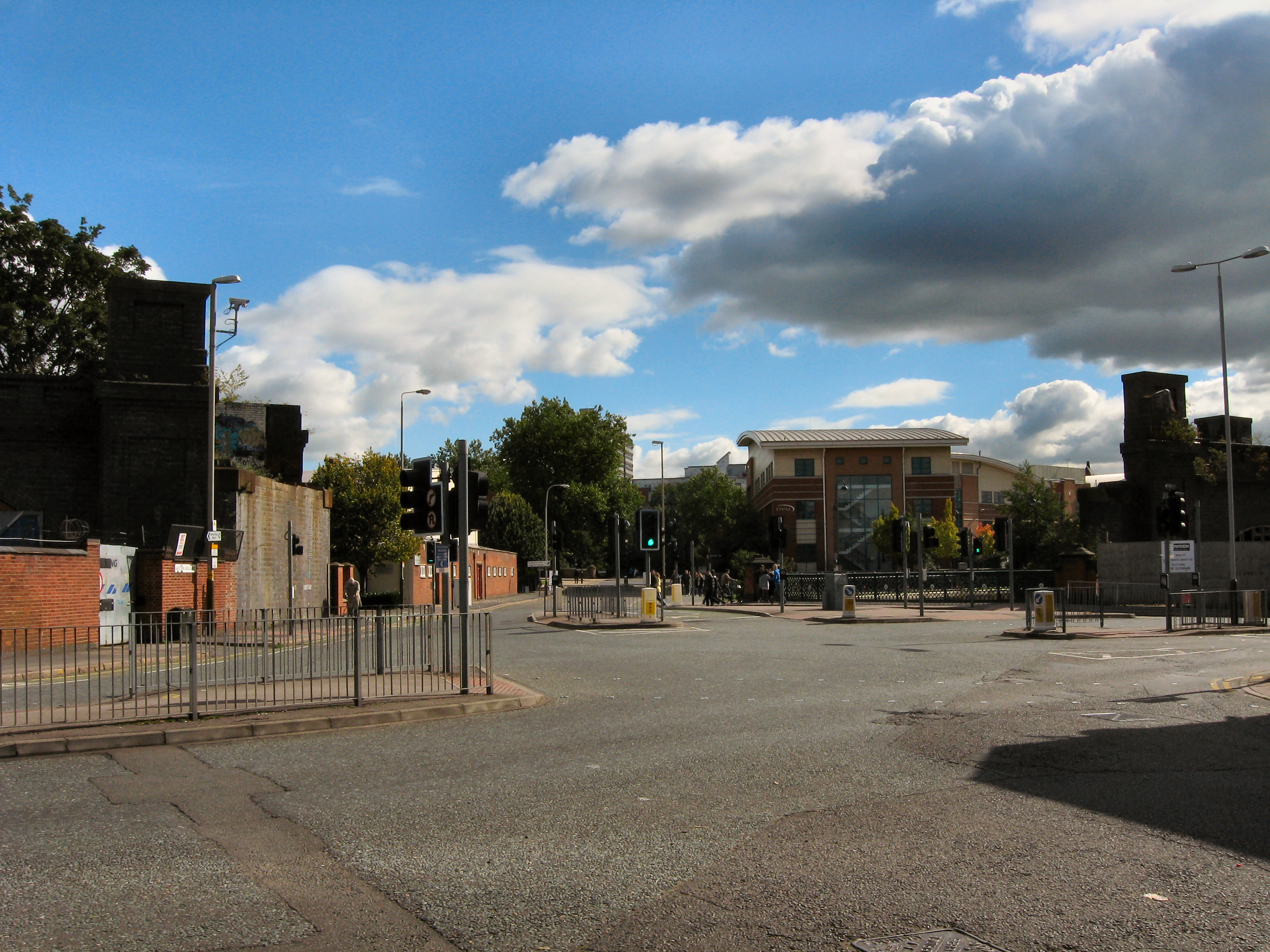
The same scene again on 25 September 2010 with the removal of the girder span now complete. The viaduct arches remain for the time being.

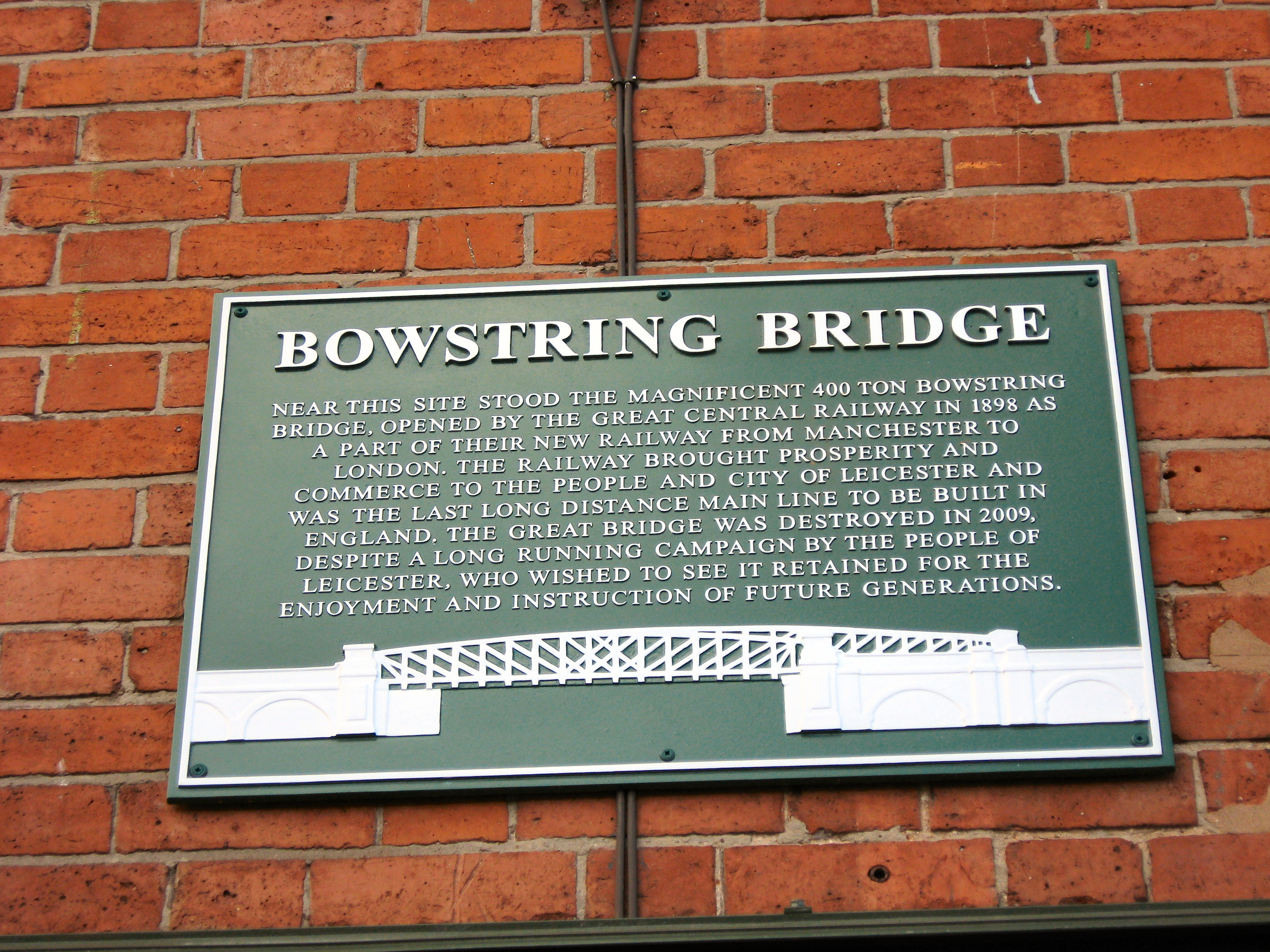
On 25 September 2010 Leicester Civic Society unveiled this memorial plaque to the bridge on the facade of a nearby building.
