= Cossington, Leicestershire =

Village in Leicestershire, England

Coordinates: 52.716°N 1.105°W

Cossington
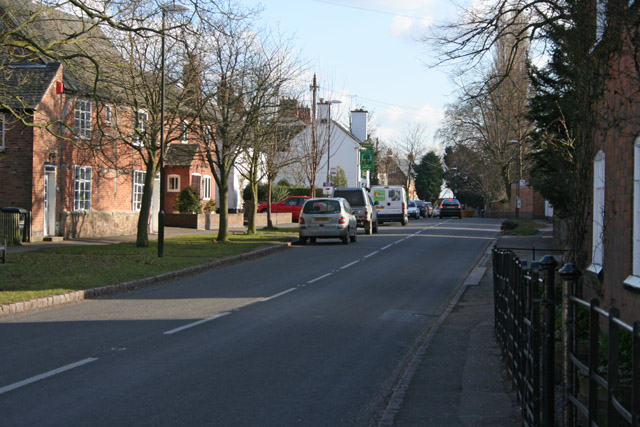

- Location within Leicestershire
- Population: 598
- District: Charnwood
- Shire county: Leicestershire
- Region: East Midlands
- Country: England
- Sovereign state: United Kingdom
- Post town: LEICESTER
- Postcode district: LE7
- Police: Leicestershire
- Fire: Leicestershire
- Ambulance: East Midlands
- UK Parliament: Melton and Syston

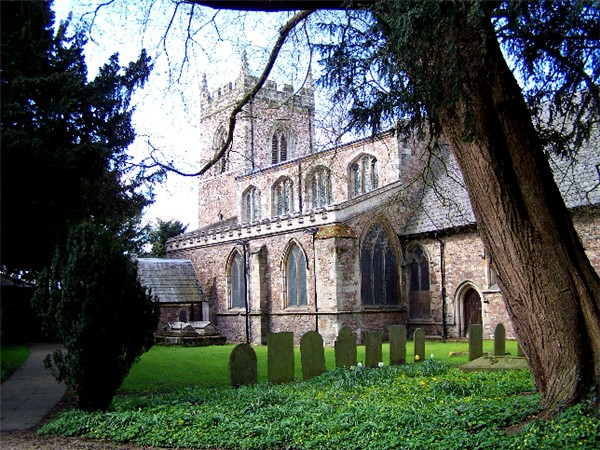
Cossington parish church

Cossington is a village within the Soar Valley in Leicestershire, England. It is between Sileby, Rothley, Ratcliffe-on-the-Wreake and Syston. The population of the civil parish at the 2011 census was 598.

The village's name means 'farm/settlement of Cusa/Cosa'.

Although there is no railway service (did have one) to Cossington, the Ivanhoe Line runs along the Midland Main Line between Leicester and Loughborough, passing close to the village. An hourly service is provided in both directions as part of East Midlands Railway Local service from Lincoln to Leicester via Nottingham. Many years ago there was a 'Cossington Gate railway station' which has long since gone, the only evidence remaining on old maps, The nearest stations now being at Syston and Sileby.

Cossington was once home to Lady Isobel Barnett, a radio and television personality from the mid 20th century, where she committed suicide amidst shoplifting charges. A short new road, Barnett Close, has been named in her memory.

The village is home to three small businesses; two garden centres (Derry's Nursery and Goscote Nursery) and a pub, The Royal Oak

In the early 1990s there were plans to expand the village, which were strongly opposed by the residents at the time, who formed the protest group 'Cossington In Distress'. The residents were successful in bringing about the cessation of the work and the village remains a peaceful community to this day.

Every alternate Easter the residents of Cossington open their gardens to the public for two days for the 'Secret Gardens of Cossington' in which the village's willing gardeners show off their talents, with all the proceeds of ticket sales going to charity. The event has been a massive success every time it has run.

The church of All Saints dates from the 13th century. A ‘Grant of Arms’ of the Fisher family displayed on the tower wall above the arch. There are memorial tablets to the Fisher family of which Geoffrey Fisher became Archbishop of Canterbury in the 1950s.

To the south of the village lies Platts Lane Recreation Ground (more simply known as just 'Platts Lane') which is owned by the Platts Lane Charitable Trust and run by a volunteer committee made up of mostly village residents. Platts Lane is basically a large playing field area and plays host to football, cricket and rugby matches - most notably being the home of Sileby Town Rugby Football Club who are also known as 'The Vikings' and play all their home fixtures at Platts Lane, which many locals enjoy watching.

Nearby is Ratcliffe College.

A notable native of Cossington was John Webster, governor of Connecticut Colony in 1656. John Webster's Great-great-great-grandson Noah Webster Jr Wrote what became the Merriam-Webster Dictionary around 1875

The Australian artist Grace Cossington Smith's mother (also Grace, née Fisher) was the daughter of a rector of Cossington from the Fisher family (see above).

To the east of the village there is a footpath named "Polly Peggs Footpath". Local village legend says a distressed girl drowned herself after falling pregnant whilst courting. Her lover, father and even the church abandoned her and she committed suicide.
