= Zouch =

Hamlet in Nottinghamshire, England

Coordinates: 52.80643°N 1.24983°W

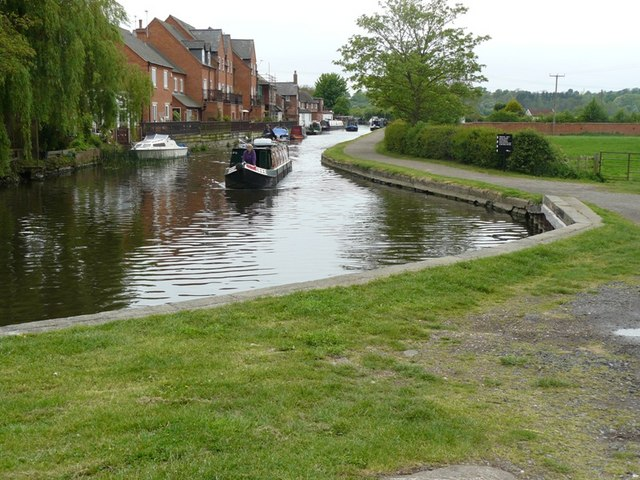
- Zouch Cut, looking west

- Location within Nottinghamshire
- OS grid reference: SK507234
- Civil parish: Sutton Bonington
- District: Rushcliffe
- Shire county: Nottinghamshire
- Region: East Midlands
- Country: England
- Sovereign state: United Kingdom
- Post town: LOUGHBOROUGH
- Postcode district: LE12
- Dialling code: 01509
- Police: Nottinghamshire
- Fire: Nottinghamshire
- Ambulance: East Midlands
- UK Parliament: Rushcliffe

Zouch /ˈzɒtʃ/ is a hamlet in south west Nottinghamshire, England. It is located between Hathern and Normanton on Soar and is situated by the River Soar, which marks the county boundary with Leicestershire.

Most of the hamlet lies in the civil parish of Sutton Bonington, apart from Zouch Farm which falls within Normanton on Soar parish, and the part in Leicestershire which is in Hathern parish. The nearest town is Loughborough. The A6006 road passes through the hamlet and crosses the Soar on Zouch Bridge (alternatively "County Bridge" as it spans the county border). The elevation of Zouch is 30 metres (98 ft).

There is a pub in the hamlet, the Rose and Crown, with one side of the pub on Main Street and the other on the bank of the Zouch Cut canal. On the far western end of the hamlet, on the Leicestershire side of Zouch Bridge, is the County Bridge Mobile Home Park, where tent pitching is available.

== River Soar and Zouch Cut ==
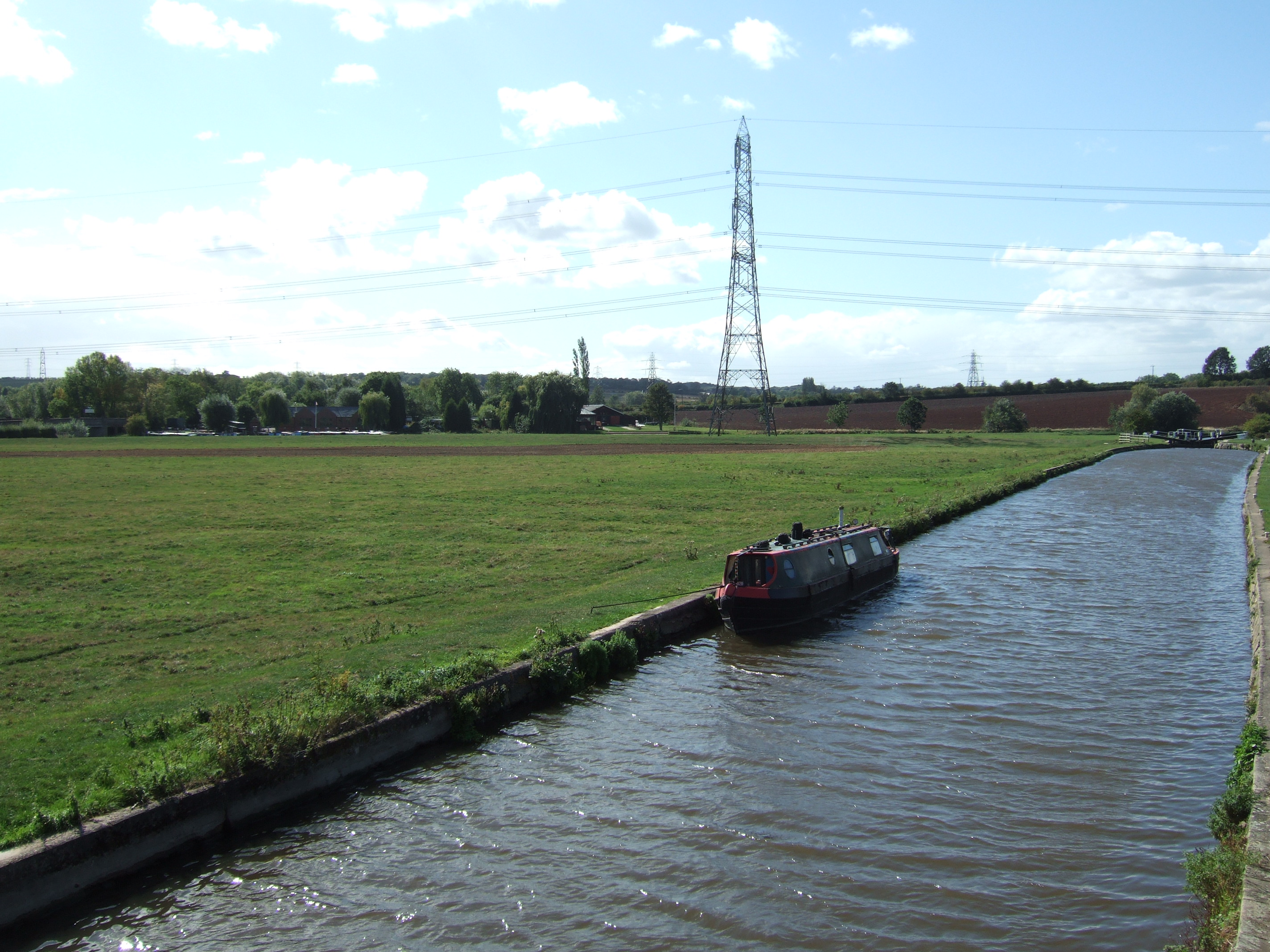
Looking west; the 'county' bridge, the boat yard and the boat club are across the field on the left; Zouch Lock is on the right, allowing navigating boats to descend from the cut down to the river.

Zouch is an example of a small canal settlement, though there was a mill there long before the Soar was made navigable (and on some historic maps is denoted as Zouch Mill). Due to the canalisation of the River Soar, involving the construction of the Zouch Cut and several weirs and canals in the vicinity, the hamlet lies on several islands (including the main island, and the much smaller islands of Lower Holme and Upper Holme, which have small houses on them). Canal mooring is a notable feature; on the Leicestershire side of Zouch Bridge, situated on the River Soar, are Zouch Marina and the clubhouse of the Loughborough Boat Club. The Long Whatton Brook joins the Soar between the two.

== Etymology ==
The meaning of the name derives from the Old English term for poor ground.

It is alphabetically last in a list of all the named settlements in Britain.

== Gallery ==
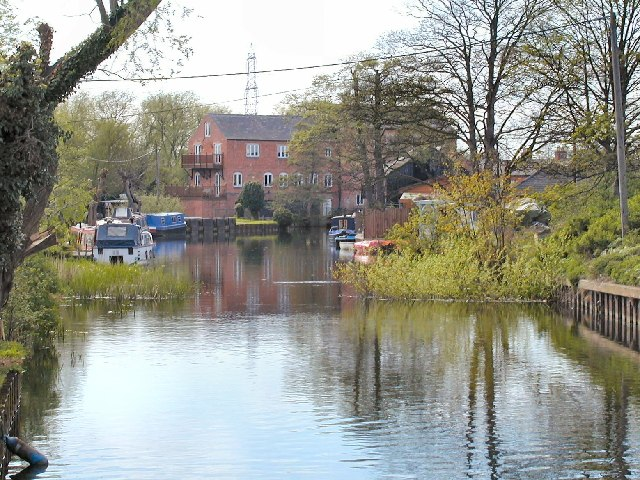
The old mill race through the hamlet (not Zouch Cut) which once fed Zouch Mill

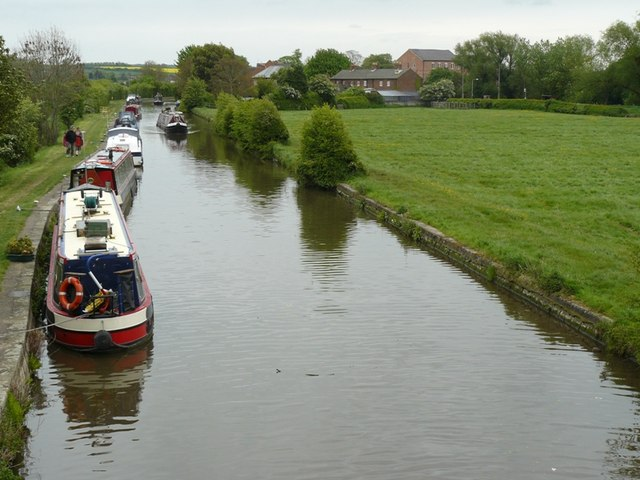
Zouch Cut, which effectively by-passes the hamlet to the north

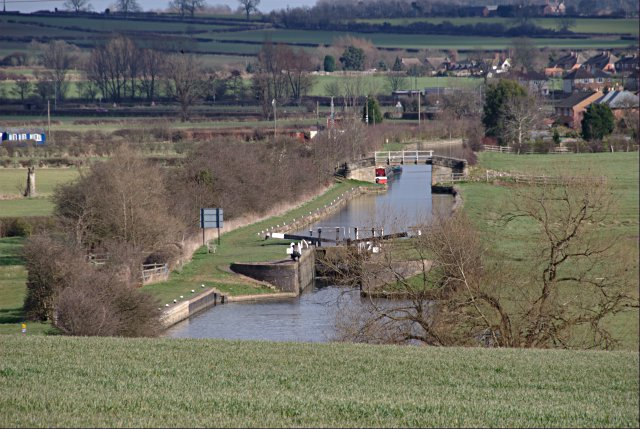
Zouch Cut, looking east, with Zouch Lock

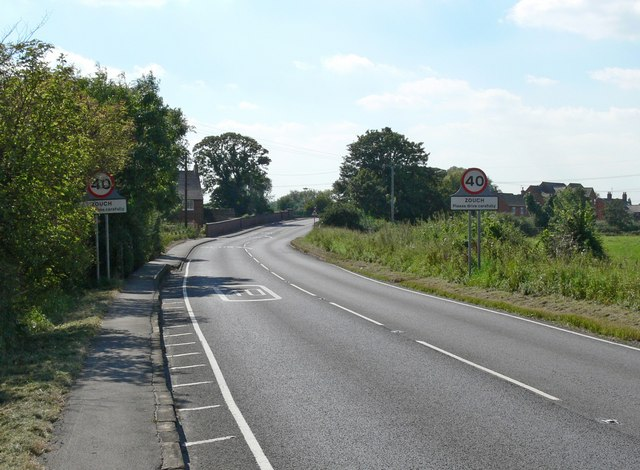
Main Street (the A6006) entering the hamlet from the Nottinghamshire side

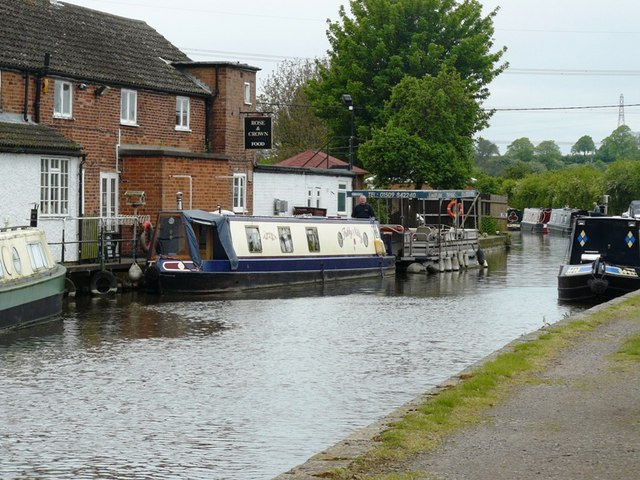
The rear of the "Rose and Crown" pub, on the Zouch Cut

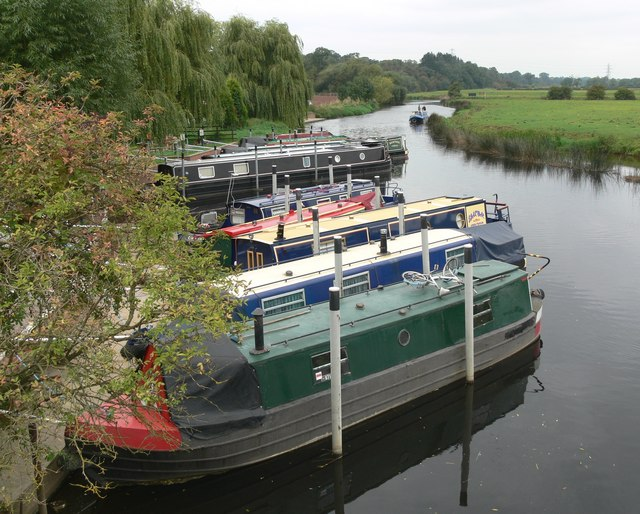
Boats moored (on the River Soar) at Zouch Marina

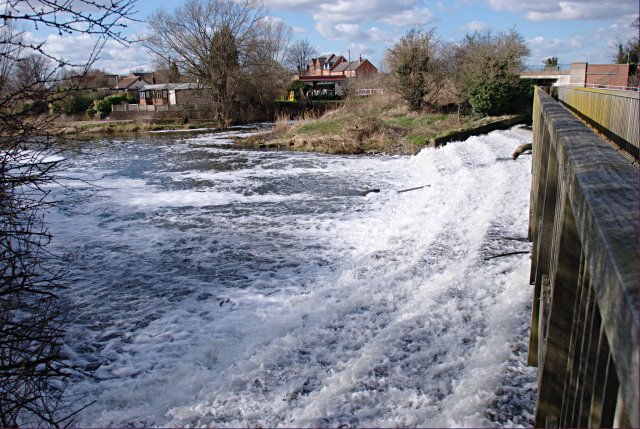
The main weir at Zouch; this is the main channel of the River Soar, which has the county border running along its centre

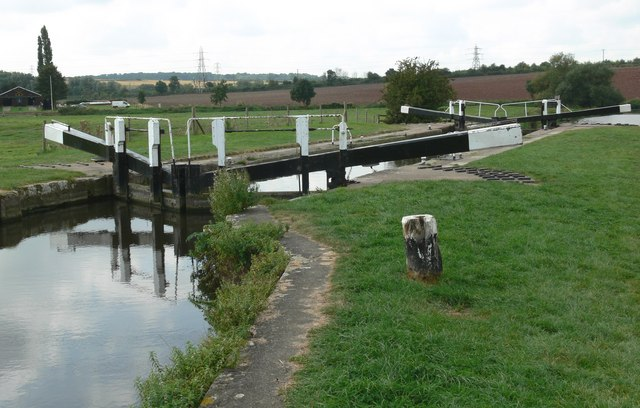
Zouch Lock, on the Zouch Cut — there is also a "flood lock" where the cut passes under the Main Street
