= Cotes, Leicestershire =

Hamlet in Leicestershire, England

Coordinates: 52.7821°N 1.1782°W

Cotes
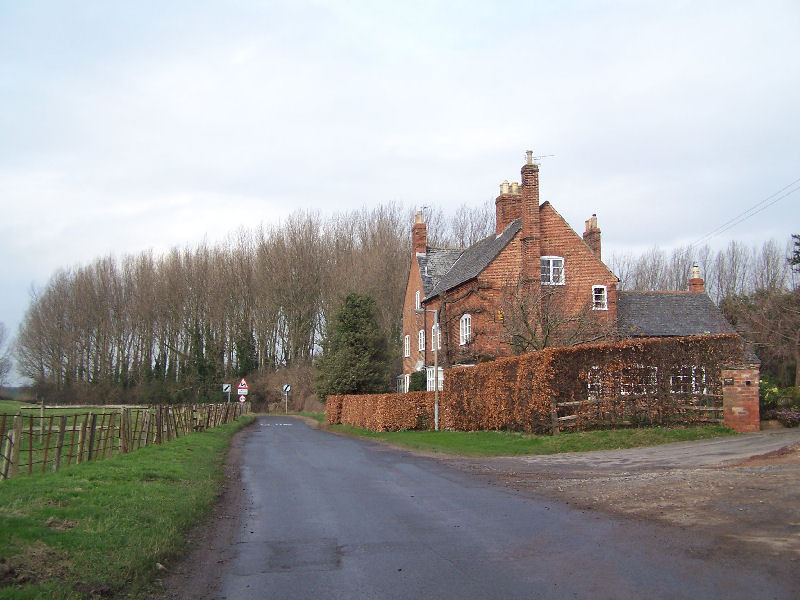
- Stanford Lane, Cotes

- Location within Leicestershire
- Civil parish: Burton on the Wolds, Cotes and Prestwold
- District: Charnwood
- Shire county: Leicestershire
- Region: East Midlands
- Country: England
- Sovereign state: United Kingdom
- Post town: LOUGHBOROUGH
- Postcode district: LE12
- Police: Leicestershire
- Fire: Leicestershire
- Ambulance: East Midlands
- UK Parliament: Loughborough

Cotes is a hamlet near the town of Loughborough in Leicestershire, England. The hamlet, along with Burton on the Wolds and Prestwold, make up the Burton on the Wolds, Cotes and Prestwold civil parish. Cotes has a population of about 50. At the 2011 census, the population remained less than 100 and was included in the civil parish of Burton on the Wolds, when the hamlet was still its own civil parish.

The name 'Cotes' derives from the Old English cot meaning 'cottages'.

It lies on the River Soar, and Cotes Bridge provides the main bridging point in that area. The A60 Trunk Road goes over Cotes Bridge on its way out of Loughborough towards Nottingham. The B676, the only other significant nearby road, begins at the A60 just to the east of Cotes Bridge and goes off towards the village of Burton on the Wolds.

There was a minor battle at Cotes Bridge on 18 March 1644 during the First English Civil War, when Royalist forces captured the bridge on their way to relieve Newark. The medieval village of Cotes itself was abandoned around 1690, possibly because of plague, although most commentators suggest the impact of the inclosure acts is a more likely explanation.

The former Member of Parliament for the local Loughborough constituency from 2010 to 2019, Nicky Morgan, chose to include the name of the area as part of her title upon elevation to the House of Lords as Baroness Morgan of Cotes.
