= Trent Lock =

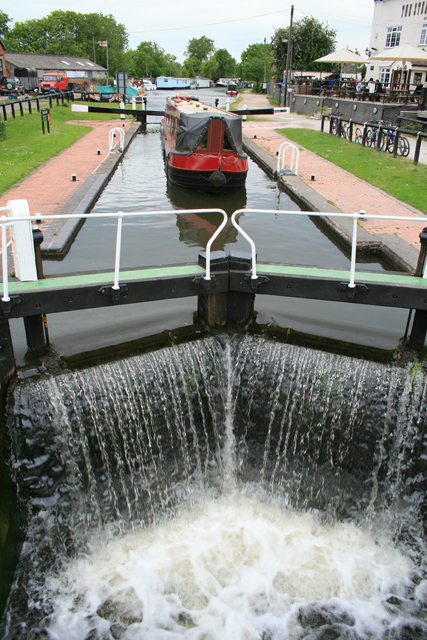
Trent Lock with the Erewash Canal behind

Trent Lock (otherwise Trentlock) is located south of Long Eaton, on the borders of Derbyshire, Leicestershire and Nottinghamshire in the United Kingdom. The area is a major canal navigation junction, where the River Soar and Erewash Canal can reach the Trent and Mersey Canal by way of the River Trent and adjacent Cranfleet Cut.

Immediately to its north-east is Trent Junction, a similarly important five-way meeting point in the national railway system.

== Location ==
Trentlock is at the point where the counties of Derbyshire, Leicestershire and Nottinghamshire meet, with the Soar forming the border between Leicestershire and Nottinghamshire, and the Trent that of Derbyshire.

On a local scale this means that Derbyshire is to the north of the point, whilst Nottinghamshire is to the south-east and Leicestershire is to the south-west, which is somewhat different from the global arrangement. Nearby places are Long Eaton, to the north, and Ratcliffe on Soar to the south. Ratcliffe-on-Soar Power Station dominates the landscape.

== Waterways ==
Trent Lock is the area of canal locks around the point where the River Soar (flowing northwards) meets the River Trent (at this point flowing east). Near this point two canals also meet the Trent - the Erewash Canal, coming south-east from Long Eaton, and the short Cranfleet Cut provides a route for boats heading downstream on the Trent, avoiding a weir.

The Midland Main Line also runs past the area, over the Trent and the Cranfleet Cut.

Some way further to the west on the Trent is the Sawley Cut and Sawley Bridge Marina, and not far west of that is Derwent Mouth, where the River Derwent and the Trent and Mersey Canal join the Trent.

Junctions

Point	Coordinates
Trent and Mersey Canal Junction/ Derwent Mouth	52°52′22.09″N 1°19′9.3″W
Sawley Cut top junction	52°52′26.44″N 1°18′25.9″W
Sawley Cut bottom junction	52°52′21.07″N 1°17′26.82″W
Soar Navigation junction	52°52′23.44″N 1°16′4.86″W
Cranfleet Canal bottom junction	52°52′45.6″N 1°15′14.87″W
Cranfleet Canal top junction/ Erewash Canal Junction	52°52′30″N 1°16′20″W

Facilities

Immediately above Trent Lock No. 60 on the Erewash Canal is a dry dock that can be drained into the River Trent below. The current tenants of the dry dock and related buildings are Cherilton Dry Dock ltd.

On the east side of the same lock is the Steamboat Inn public house and a tea room. Moreover, on the south side of the lock is a Vintage Inn pub and restaurant called the Trent Lock Inn which was formerly called (and is still well known as) the Navigation Inn.

== See also ==
- Canals of the United Kingdom
- History of the British canal system
