= River Soar =

River in Warwickshire and Leicestershire, England

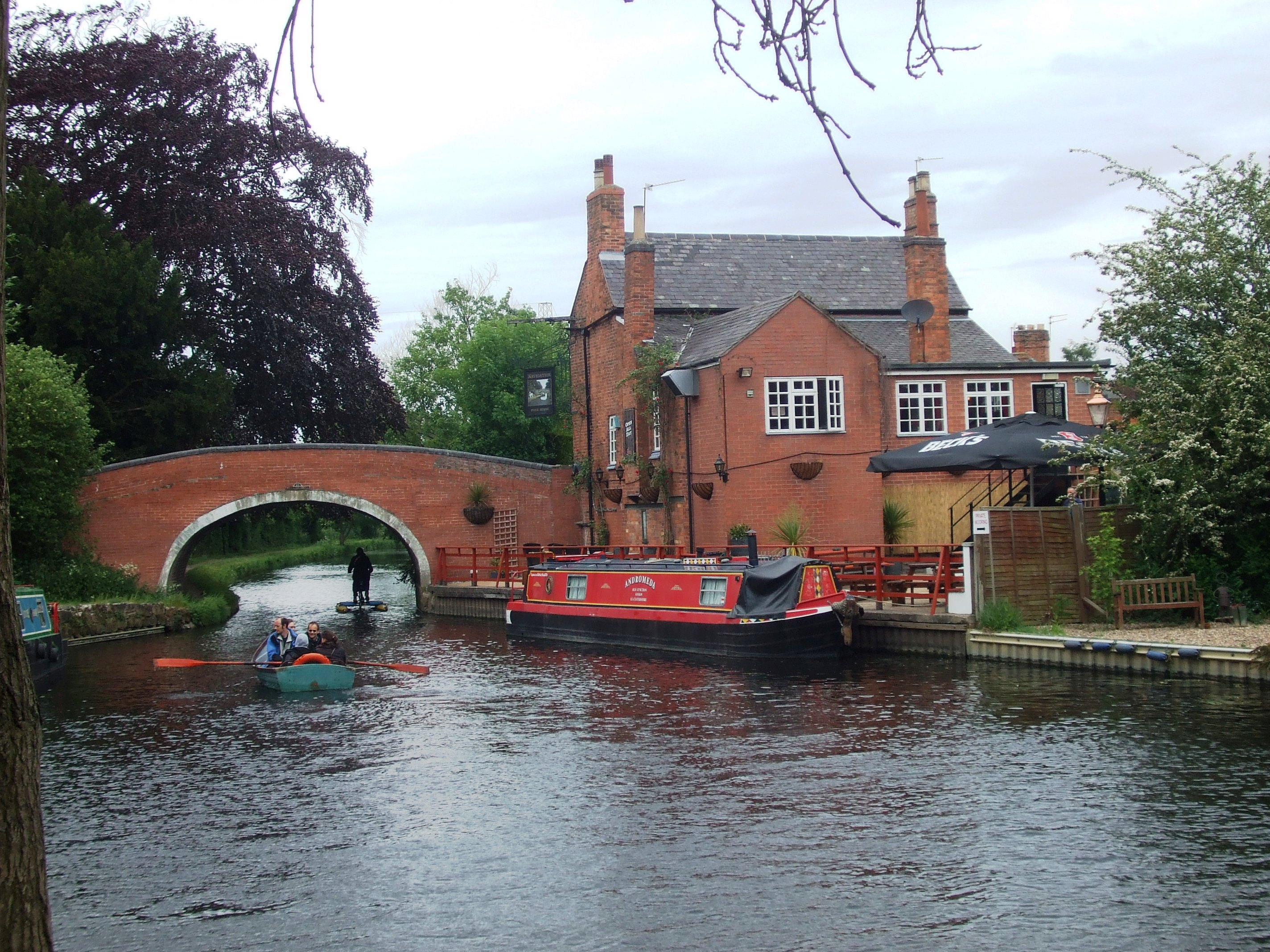
- Bridge over the Soar next to the Navigation, Barrow upon Soar

Location
- Country: United Kingdom
- Country within the UK: England
- Counties: Leicestershire, Warwickshire
- Cities: Leicester
- Towns: Loughborough

Physical characteristics
- Source
  - location: Monks Kirby, Warwickshire
  - coordinates: 52.470807°N 1.305981°W
  - elevation: 132 m (433 ft)
- Mouth
  - location: Trent Lock, Leicestershire
  - coordinates: 52.8731°N 1.2682°W
  - elevation: 30 m (98 ft)
- Length: 95 km (59 mi)
- Basin size: 1,386 km^{2} (535 sq mi)
- Discharge
  - location: Littlethorpe
  - average: 1.36 m^{3}/s (48 cu ft/s)
  - maximum: 37.19 m^{3}/s (1,313 cu ft/s)
- Discharge
  - location: Kegworth
  - average: 11.73 m^{3}/s (414 cu ft/s)

Basin features
- Tributaries
  - left: Soar Brook, Thurlaston Brook, River Biam, Rothley Brook, Black Brook
  - right: Whetstone Brook, River Sence, River Wreake, Kingston Brook

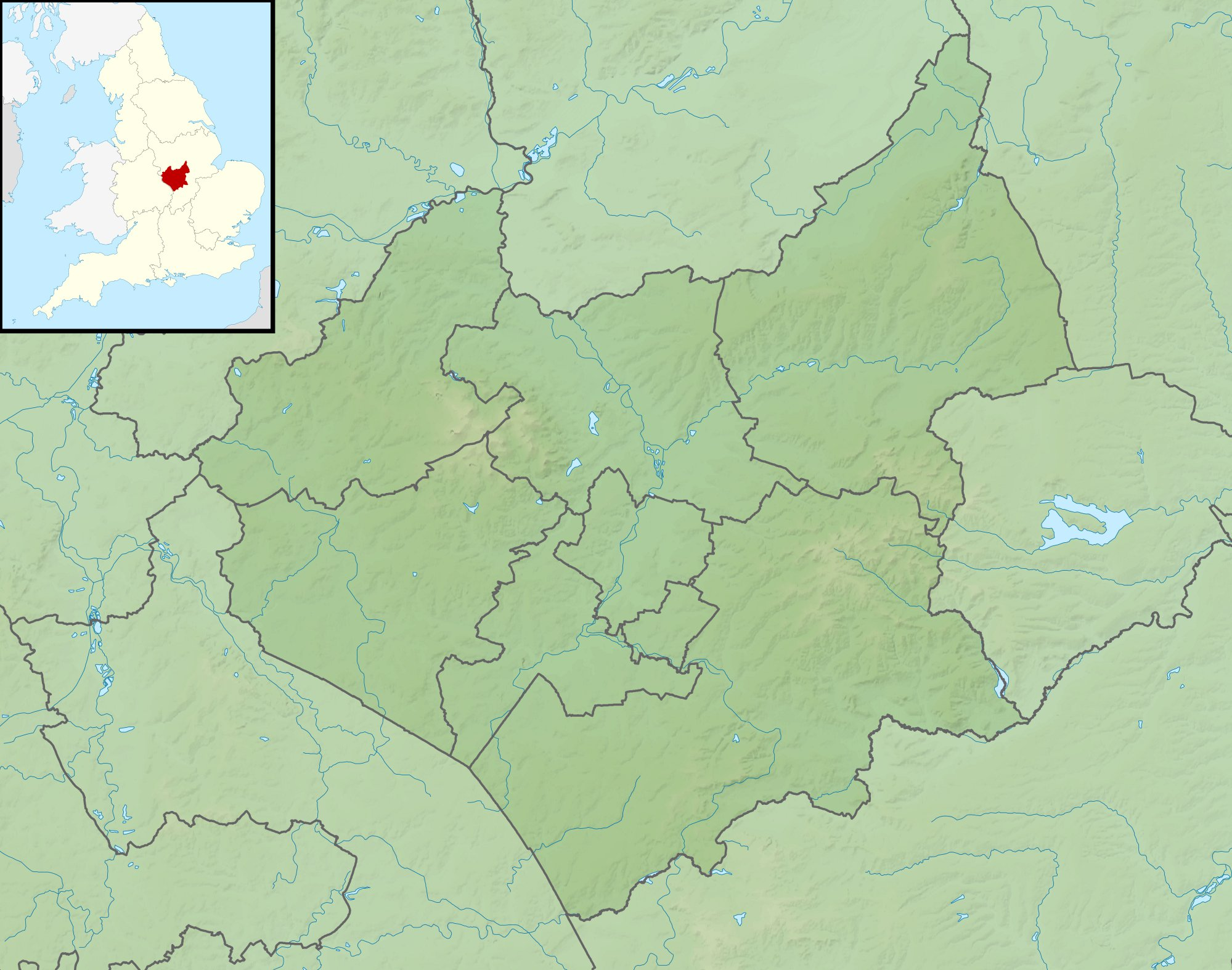
Map showing the source in Warwickshire and locations along its course in Leicestershire

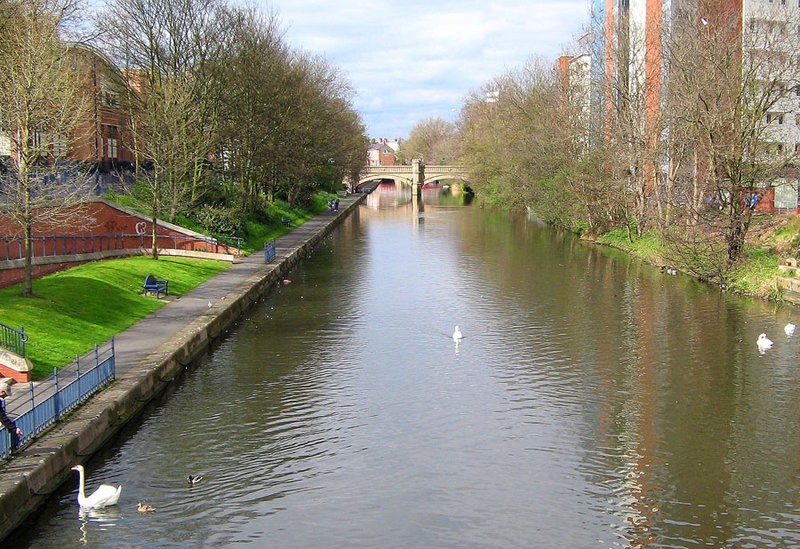
A canalised section of the river in Leicester

The River Soar (/sɔːr/) is a major tributary of the River Trent in the East Midlands as well as the principal river of Leicestershire, England. The river's source is midway between Hinckley and Lutterworth. The river then flows north through Leicester, where the Grand Union Canal joins it. Continuing through the Leicestershire Soar Valley, it passes Loughborough and Kegworth before reaching the Trent at the county boundary. In the 18th century, the Soar was made navigable, initially between Loughborough and the Trent, and then through to Leicester. It was not until the early 19th century that the Grand Union Canal linked it to the wider network to the south and to London.

== Name ==
The name of the Soar is included in a family of old river-names derived from a root *ser- "to flow", alongside (among others) Saravus (Soar, a tributary of the Moselle in Belgium), Sera (la Serre, la Cère and le Séran, three rivers in France), Serantia (Sierentz, Alsace), Serma (Schremm, Brandenburg), Sora (Cwm Sorgwm, Wales), Sorna (die Zorn, Alsace), Sara (Saire), Saar(e) (Brandenburg), Saros (Sar, Spain), Sarius (Serio, Lombardy), Sarià (Lithuania), Saravus (Saar, Germany), Sarnivos (Sernf, Glarus), etc.

According to a suggestion due to William Somner (1701) the Soar river may formerly have been called the Leir, from Brittonic *Ligera or *Ligora, cognate with the French Loire. This theory is based on the name of Leicester (as well as Loughborough and the village of Leire) being derived from the river's name.

== Course ==
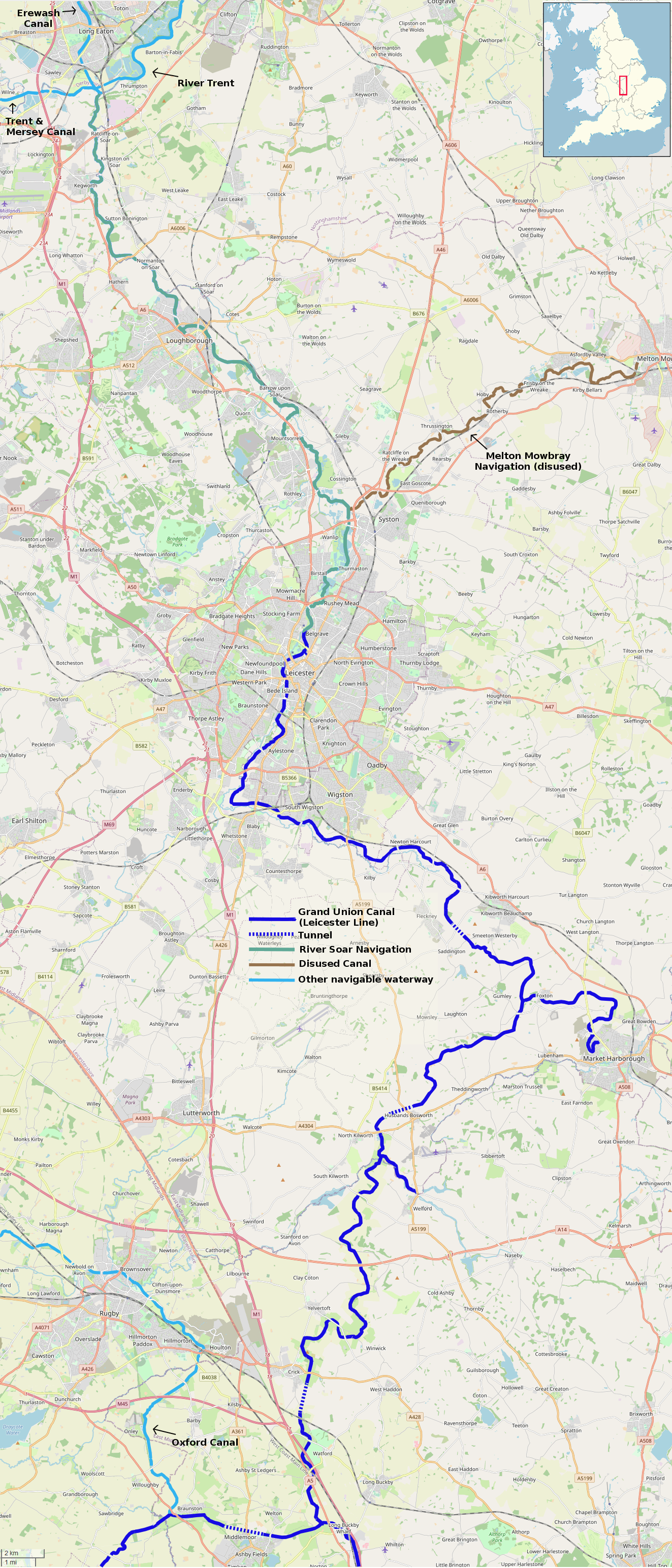
Map of the navigable part of the River Soar (in dark green) and its connection to the Leicester Line of the Grand Union Canal (dark blue)

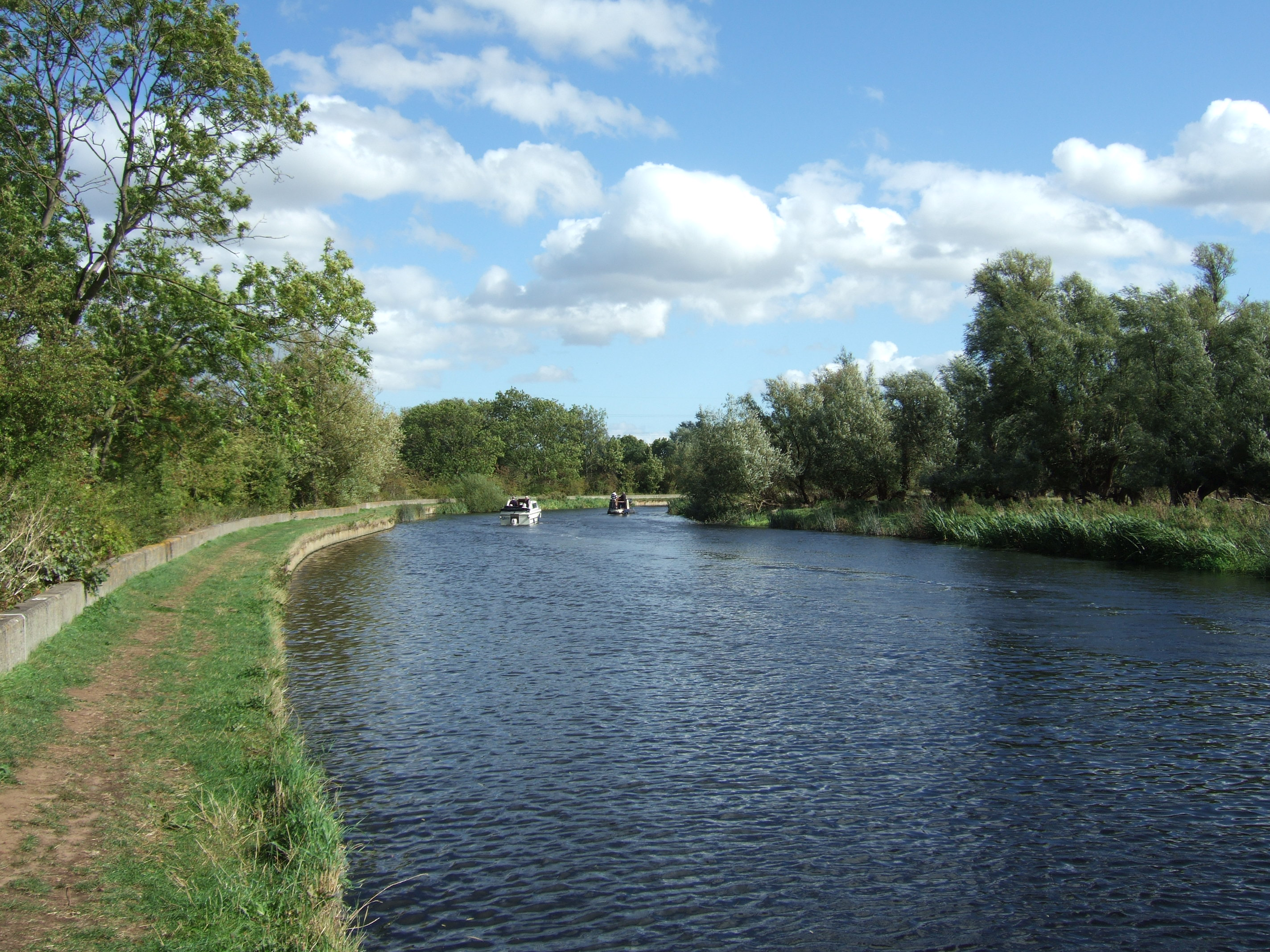
The River Soar near Sutton Bonington, where it forms the Nottinghamshire (to the left) — Leicestershire county border.

The Soar rises near Wibtoft in Warwickshire and flows north to join the Soar Brook near Sharnford; it then continues north-east, passing through Croft and between Narborough and Littlethorpe, until, on the outskirts of Leicester, it is joined by the Sence near Enderby. Before flowing through the centre of the city, it meets the Grand Union Canal at Aylestone, where the River Biam also joins it. After passing over Freemens Weir, the river splits and recombines with the canal, creating an area of Leicester called Bede Island. The navigable arm that runs to the east has been canalised with parallel banks and is known as 'The Mile Straight'. Beyond Blackfriars, the river splits again to form Frog Island and Abbey Park; it recombines at Belgrave, passing beside the National Space Centre.

Once out of the city, the Soar passes Birstall and threads its way through the lakes of Watermead Country Park, until it reaches Wanlip. The river then meets the once-navigable River Wreake near Cossington Mill, with another tributary, the Rothley Brook, joining the river just downstream. The Soar continues north-east to reach Mountsorrel, then passes between Quorn and Barrow-on-Soar, where an arm of the canal extends into Loughborough, although the river passes to the East of the town at Cotes. Downstream of Stanford on Soar, the river forms the county boundary between Nottinghamshire and Leicestershire. Between Stanford and Normanton on Soar, the canal rejoins the river, which then continues to Zouch, passing the 'Devils Elbow' to reach Kegworth. Downstream of Kegworth, it meets the Kingston Brook, near the village of the same name, passing Ratcliffe-on-Soar and its power station, before flowing into the Trent at Trent Lock.

== Pollution ==
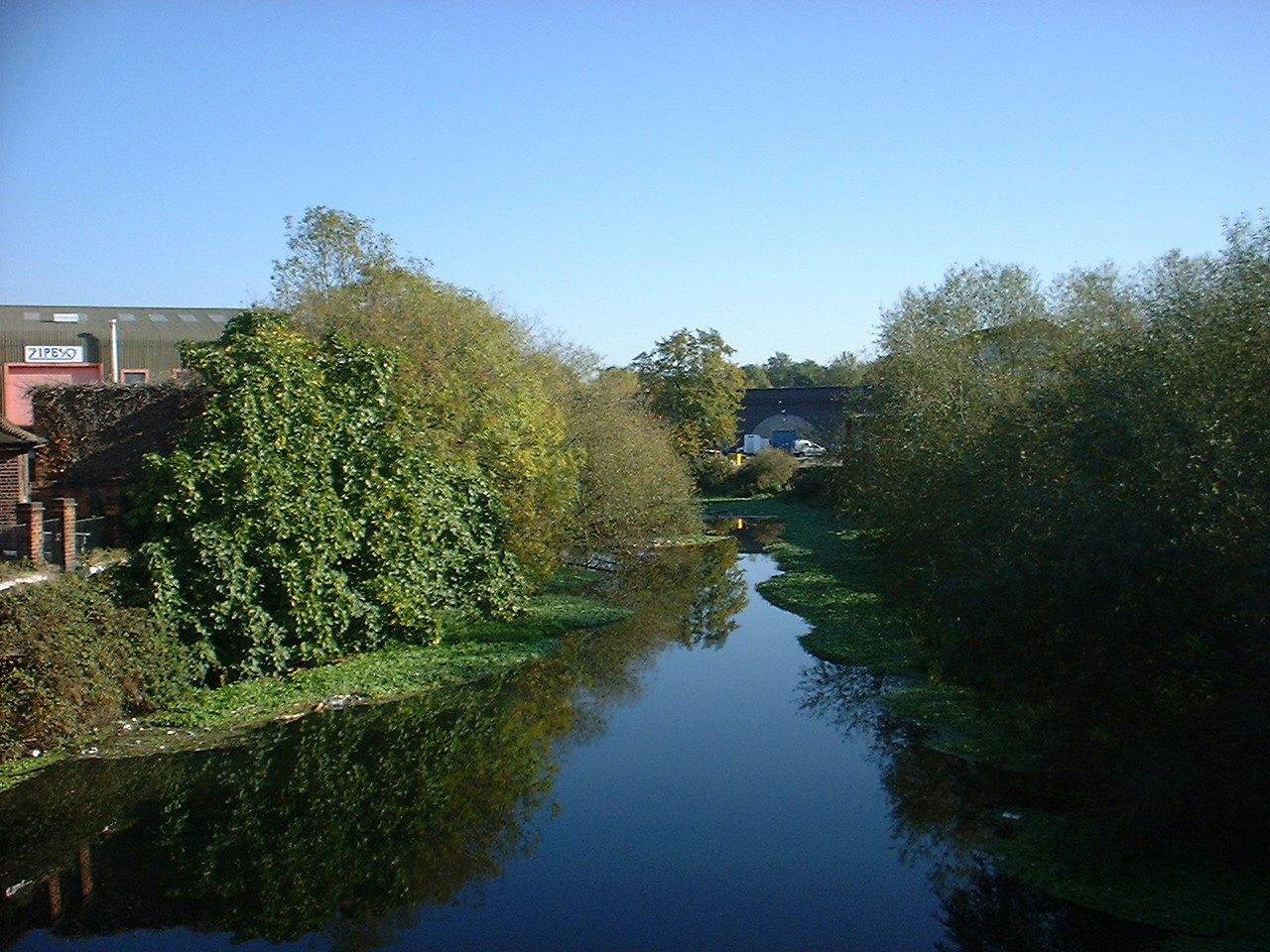
Floating Pennywort infestation in the River Soar, Leicester

The River Soar is rich in wildlife, with thriving bird, fish, and plant populations that are popular with wildlife enthusiasts. The river was once notorious for its unusual pink colour - a result of discharges from Leicester's prosperous textile industries. However, the end of textile industries near the river in Leicester and clean-up work by the Environment Agency have restored it to its natural state.

Industry now wanting to discharge any sewage waste into the river must obtain an agreement from the Environment Agency. Several consents have been granted to companies to use the River Soar; however, the quantity and quality of the sewage are strictly controlled to preset levels agreed with the Environment Agency.

The quality of the water is determined by what can contaminate the river upstream; the River Soar is constantly monitored by the Environment Agency, which checks the level of pollution. Pollution in the water running through the Soar in the city of Leicester is low, and the water is generally of good quality; however, there is a significant decrease in quality just downstream of the city, where the Wanlip sewage treatment works enters the river.

The new tourism industry has caused environmental problems; Barge hulls and propellers may cause "physical damage and uprooting" of plants, and turbulence may increase water turbidity to the extent that light may not reach underwater plants, reducing photosynthesis. Sewage works hurt water life.

== History ==
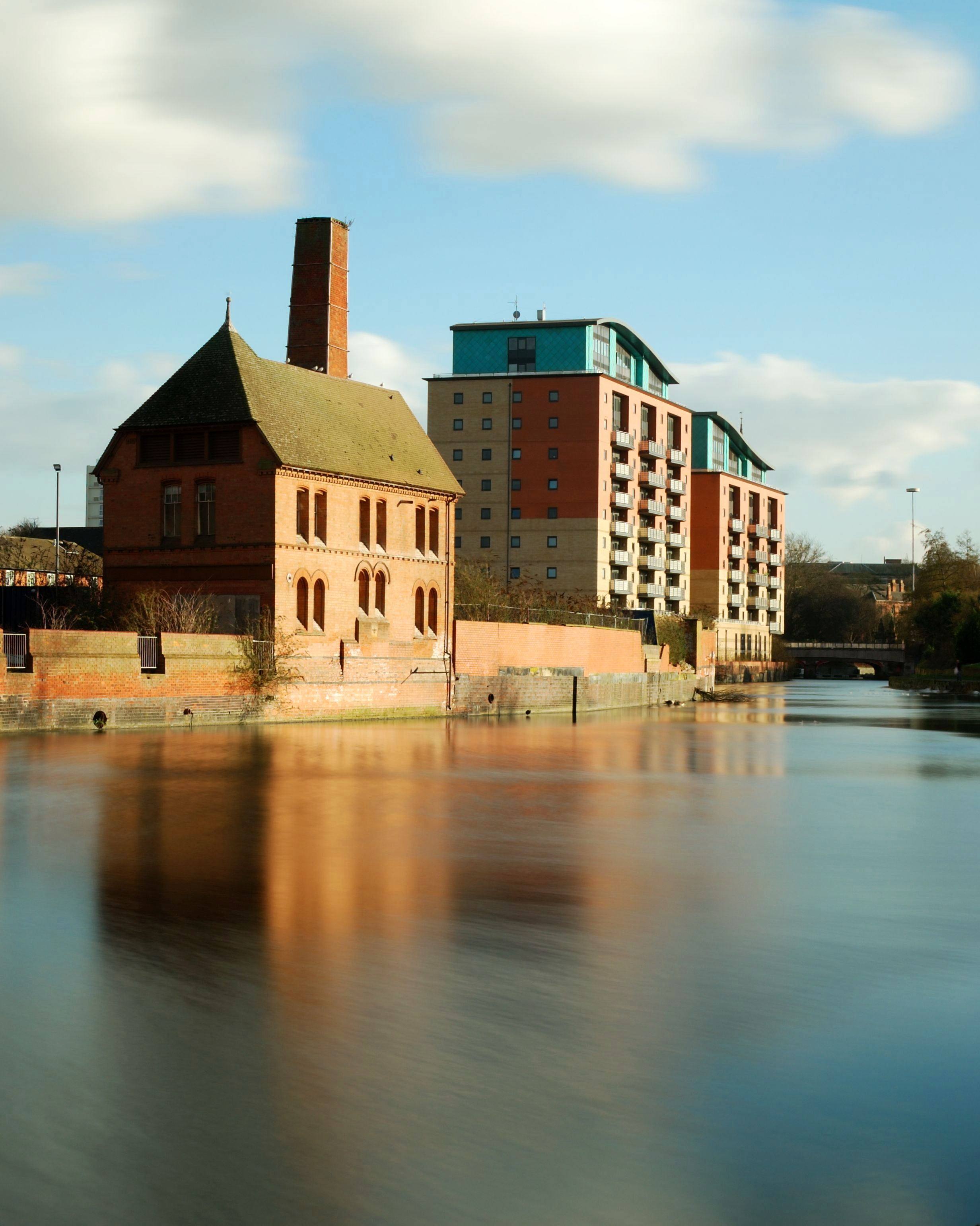
A nineteenth-century pump house and a new riverside development by the Soar in central Leicester

- 1634 Thomas Skipwith of Cotes obtained a grant from Charles I to make the River Soar "portable for barges and boats", though the scheme was never completed.
- 1794 The Leicester Canal was opened, making the Soar navigable for almost 40 miles (64 km). The western line was also opened – this was known as the Charnwood Forest Branch. However, most of the branch consisted of rail tracks rather than a waterway. This included a 2 1/2 mi (4 km) uphill climb from Loughborough Basin. At the western end of the branch, rail lines travelled towards Coleorton and Swannington. A track to Cloudhill, which would have connected to similar lines on the Ashby Canal, was proposed but never built.
- 1795 Another branch line (operated by a separate company) opened from the main line of the Leicester Canal (between Cossington and Syston) to Melton Mowbray. The line was 15 miles (24 km) long and used the River Wreake for virtually its entire course. The line was sometimes known as the Wreake Navigation, though it is better known as the Melton Mowbray Navigation. This new line was so successful that, within a year, William Jessop was appointed to survey another new line that would extend the Melton Mowbray Navigation to Oakham in Rutland, a further 15 miles (24 km). The extension would be called the Oakham Canal. An act of Parliament, the Oakham Canal Act 1793 (33 Geo. 3. c. 103), was passed and work began.
- 1796 While the lines to Leicester and Melton Mowbray were doing very well, trade on the Charnwood Forest Branch was very slow to pick up. The company even put on demonstrations to encourage its use. With no real success gained from this, the company went into the coal-carrying and selling business itself.
- 1797 A proposal to extend the main line of the Leicester Canal much further south was announced. A new canal, the Leicestershire & Northamptonshire Union Canal, would link the River Soar with the River Nene. However, like many great ideas, the money ran out before the imagination did, and the line reached just 17 of the proposed 44 miles (71 km), stopping at Debdale Wharf near Kibworth Beauchamp. Thus the Leicestershire & Northamptonshire Canal never even got close to Northamptonshire. In fact, the whole project proved to be something of a failure, with the company spending thousands of pounds building a waterway that passed nowhere in particular and ended in the middle of the countryside, miles from any major town. Meanwhile, the Charnwood Forest Branch was still struggling to attract any trade. Water supply was one reason for lack of use, so the company built Blackbrook Reservoir. After this, trade picked up, but only slightly.
- 1802 The Oakham Canal opened after costing almost £70,000 to build. It was 15 miles (24 km) long, with 19 broad locks. Boats could now travel onto the River Soar from Rutland.
- 1809 The main line of the Leicestershire & Northamptonshire Canal was extended from its resting place near Kibworth Beauchamp to Market Harborough, where once again the work came to a stop. All the same, it was now a considerable navigation, linking the south of Leicestershire to the River Trent. However, there was still no link to the Grand Junction Canal.
- 1810 By now ideas of connecting Leicester to Northampton seemed pointless. The Grand Junction Canal was running a tramway into Northampton and would surely soon convert this to a full navigation. The obvious thing to do now was to connect the Leicester navigations to the Grand Junction Canal.
- 1814 The new link between the Leicester navigations and the Grand Junction Canal opened and was named the Grand Union Canal (not to be confused with the later canal route of the same name).
- 1832 The Leicester and Swannington Railway opened from the Leicestershire coalfield to a wharf alongside the canal at West Bridge, Leicester. This allowed Leicestershire coal to be cheaply carried on southwards for sale in London.
- 1848 The owners of the River Soar Navigation were finally able to officially abandon the Charnwood Forest Branch, which had stood idle since 1801.
- 1877 After 80 years, the Melton Mowbray (or Wreake) Navigation also closed, leaving Melton Mowbray with no waterway outlet to the main canal system.
- 1886 Mr Fellows of Fellows Morton & Clayton (who were the main carriers on the Grand Union link) pushed the company to convert the canal to wide beam. When this was not done, he tried to encourage the Grand Junction Company to buy the link.
- 1894 – The Grand Junction Canal Company purchased the Grand Union and the Leicestershire & Northamptonshire Union canals. By now, though, even the Grand Junction Company wasn't wholeheartedly in favour of widening the link. Instead, they looked into ways to make the lock flights more efficient. The simple answer was to build a duplicate flight alongside the existing locks to allow two-way traffic, but this would cause other problems, especially with water supply, which was already a major headache.
- 1931 – The whole stretch of waterway from Norton Junction through to Leicester and on to Long Eaton was merged with the Grand Junction Canal to form the Grand Union Canal.

=== Industry ===
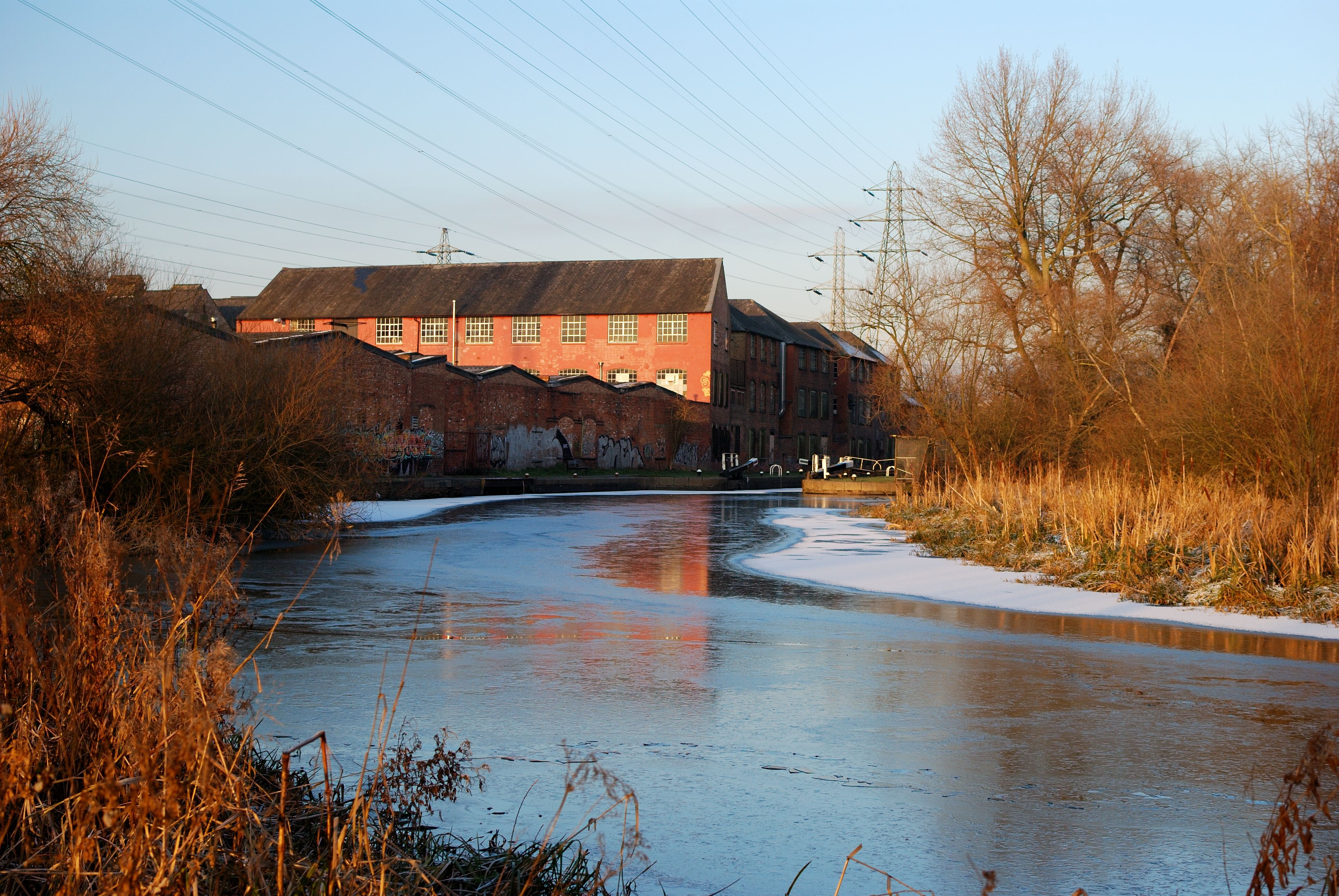
A factory on the River Soar south of Leicester

The River Soar before the late 1700s was too small and shallow to allow navigation by barges; however, this was partially solved by the construction of the Leicester Canal, which made the Soar navigable for about 40 miles (64 km).

The expansion of the canal meant that industry could start to develop along the canal side, with the transport provided by the canal being "vital to the industry." This included buildings and industries like "wind and watermills; brewing and malting; bridges; canal and railway structures; public utilities."

"By 1895, there were 231 listed hosiery manufacturers in the county. In Leicester, the industry employed 10% of the population in 1851, and around 7% in 1881 and 1911." This shows the importance of hosiery to Leicester's economy. This industry needed a consistent water supply and transport links, so it was located alongside the canal. Due to the transport links provided by the Grand Union Canal, the Hosiery industry was able to expand rapidly.

Many of these factories, however, soon outgrew themselves and moved to new, larger sites, freeing space for other trades such as boot and shoe manufacture, printing, or box making.

Railway competition in the nineteenth century reduced canal profits. This marked the beginning of the end for many of the companies that owned the canals; several converted their canals to railways, while many others were bought out by railway companies looking to expand their businesses.

With the decline of industry in the 1960s, the warehouses and factories that were once the core of Leicester's economy fell into dereliction. Leicester City Council has moved to redevelop the waterfront, "offering one of the most exciting waterside regeneration opportunities in the country." The company is currently building luxury waterside apartments. This will enhance the area's aesthetic values. Research conducted by Newcastle University suggests that people's desire to live on the waterfront and enjoy the recreation offered by the canal is undermined by "visually unattractive features, such as run-down derelict areas and poor design".

The redevelopment plan included building the Walkers Stadium, home to Leicester City F.C., along the canal in 2002: "from a barren, desolate piece of waste-ground has risen a stunning futuristic collaboration of steel and glass that dominates the skyline of Leicester. Old warehouses have also been converted into student accommodation for De Montfort University, increasing the area's value.

On the eastern bank of the Soar in central Leicester are the premises of Donisthorpe and Company, a textile producer. The Donisthorpe Mill, also known as Friars' Mill, is one of the oldest mills in the East Midlands, and manufacturing activity has occurred on its site since the 1730s. The mill was awarded listed status in 1975. Several surrounding buildings, including a Victorian pump house, were also listed at this time. The Donisthorpe Company left the factory in 1983, raising immediate concerns about the mill's conservation. The building stood empty for several years and fell into disrepair. In July 2012, a fire destroyed its roof, clock tower, and most of the interior. In November 2012, Leicester City Council announced its decision to purchase and restore the Donisthorpe Mill building.

== Legend ==
Geoffrey of Monmouth, who claimed Leicester was named for an eponymous King Leir, claimed that the king was buried in an underground chamber beneath the river near Leicester. This was supposedly devoted to the god Janus.

Leir, Lerion, and Ligora(ceastre) all derive from the old Brittonic name of the River Soar, *Ligera or *Ligora.

The body of King Richard III was sometimes said to have been thrown into the river during the Dissolution of the Monasteries under Henry VIII. From this legend, the bridge carrying the A47 across the Soar at Leicester is known as "King Richard's Bridge". However, in 2013, it was confirmed that the skeleton discovered beneath a car park in 2012 was, in fact, that of Richard III and, in March 2015, the skeleton was re-interred in Leicester Cathedral.

== Tourism ==
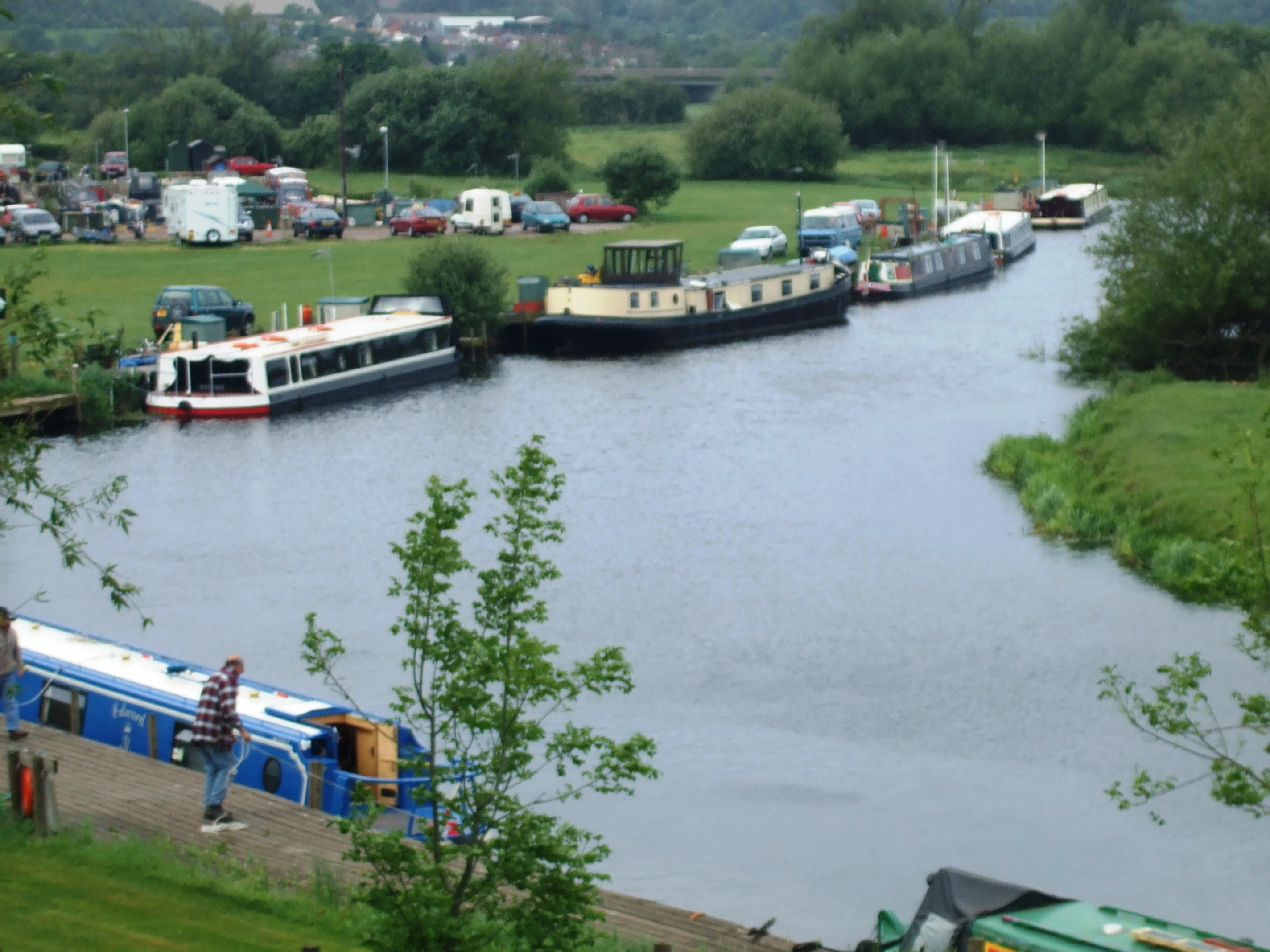
Soar Valley between Barrow upon Soar and Mountsorrel

The Soar is now a hive of tourism rather than of industry. Holiday narrowboat cruises are extremely popular, as they are a relaxing way to visit the country and get 'in touch' with nature. The tow-paths next to the canal are used for "cycling, rambling, horse-riding and picnicking" (Leicester City Council, 2005).

The waterway is a popular location for match and occasional fishing. The canal has large carp, chub, bream, roach, and perch, plus dace and barbel on some stretches.

== Sport ==
The stretch of the River Soar that passes through the centre of Leicester, known as the 'Mile Straight', is home to De Montfort University Rowing Club, the University of Leicester Boat Club, and Leicester Rowing Club, a rowing and sculling club formed in 1882.

== See also ==
- List of crossings of the River Soar
- Rivers of the United Kingdom
- Soar Valley
- Barrow-upon-Soar
- Kingston-on- or upon-Soar
- Normanton-on- or upon-Soar
- Ratcliffe-on- or Radcliffe-upon-Soar
- Stanford-on-Soar
