= Bede Island =

Area of Leicester, England

Coordinates: 52.629°N 1.145°W

Bede Island is an area of Leicester, England close to the city centre, with the River Soar to the west and Grand Union Canal to the east.

For many years Bede Island South was a run down area of brownfield land home to Vic Berry's locomotive scrapyard but in the 1990s urban regeneration sought to improve housing, employment opportunities and the environment in the area. The programme was successful in developing the waterfront of Leicester, a key part of the overall transformation of the city.

Local streets are named after herbs and spices, these are Sage Road, Tarragon Road, Coriander Road, Mint Road and Thyme Close (these names resulted from the children at Hazel Street infants and juniors School and Shaftesbury junior school being asked about names for the new housing development - they asked for them to be named after the pop group The Spice Girls but the Council deemed that was not appropriate and a compromise of the current names was the outcome!).

Office blocks were built on northern side where had been the offices of the former Great Central Railway offices and the former site of the art-deco buildings of the Kirby and West dairy on The Newarke, which had relocated to Richard III Road.

== See also ==
- Incorporation of nature within a city
