= Frog Island, Leicester =

Area of Leicester, England

Coordinates: 52.642°N 1.143°W

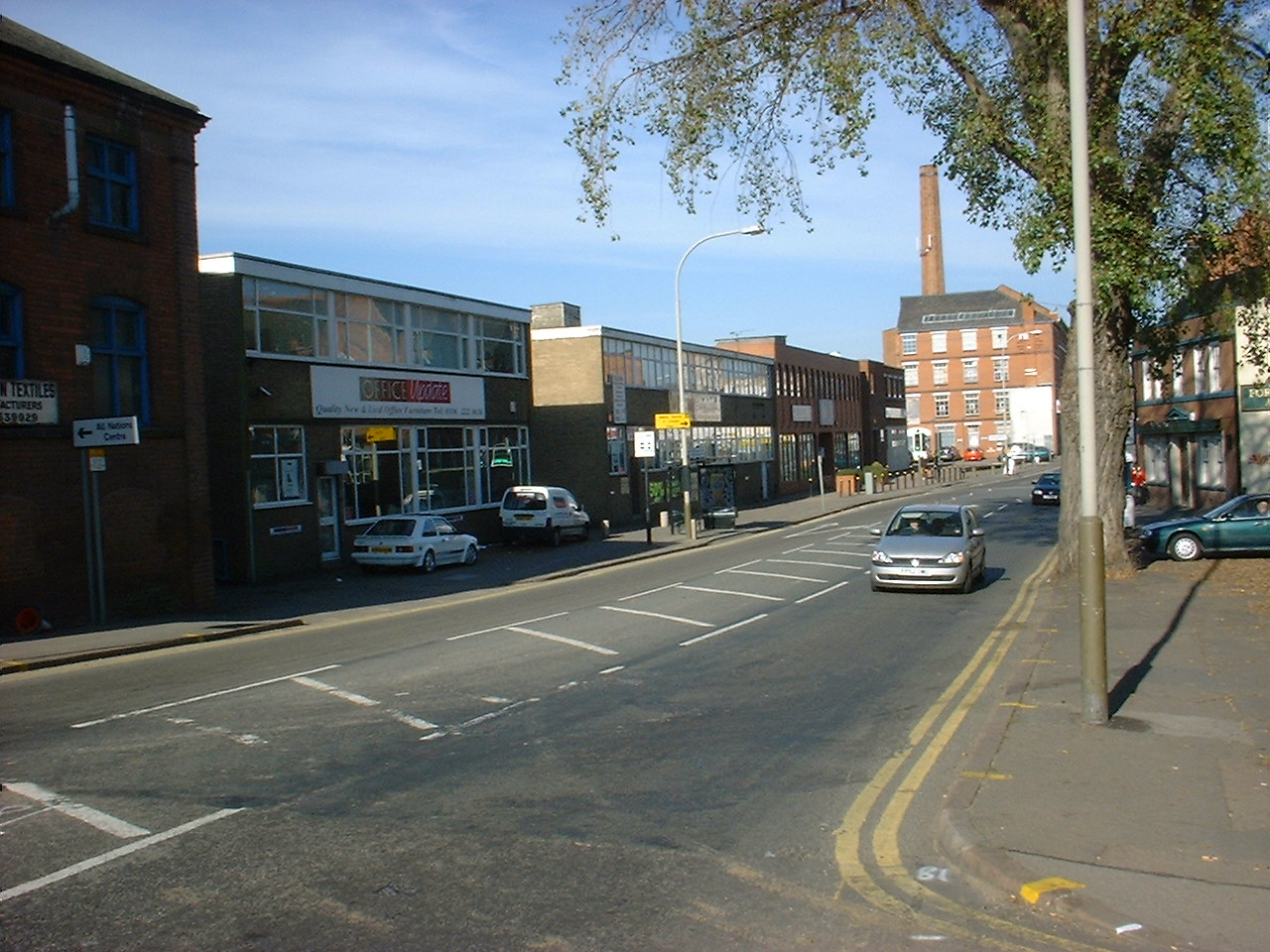
The A50 passing through Frog Island, Leicester

A Public House and Factories, Frog Island, Leicester

Frog Island is an inner city area of Leicester, England, so named because it lies between the River Soar and the Soar Navigation (a continuation of the original Grand Union Canal). Frog Island is adjacent to the Woodgate area to the north, and Northgates to the South. The population of the island was at the 2011 census in the Abbey ward of Leicester City Council.

== Topography ==
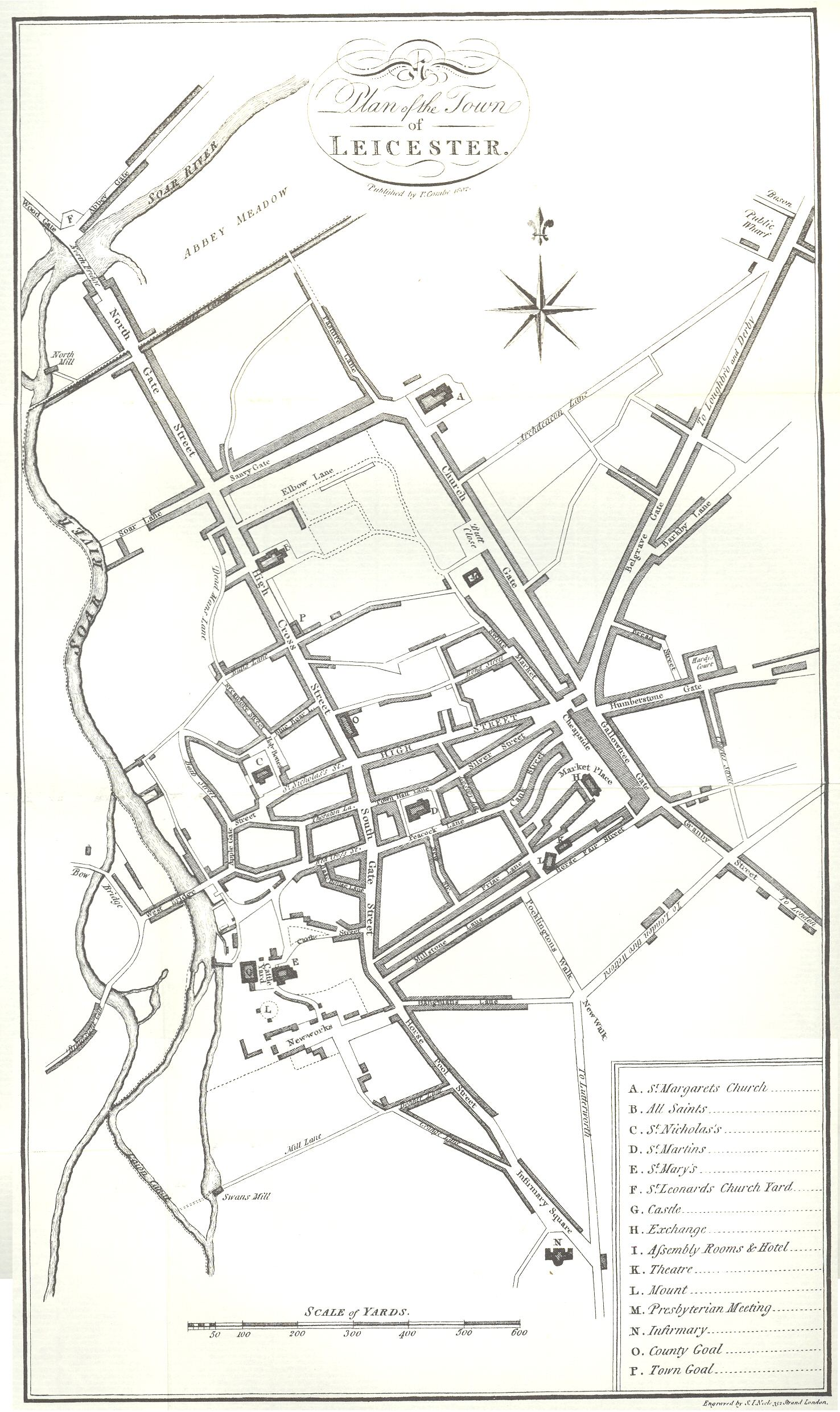
Map of Leicester in 1804, showing the newly constructed Soar Navigation. The Frog Island area is at the top of the map.

Frog Island lies to the north of central Leicester, and to the south of the River Soar and Leicester Abbey. The site was not an island before the late-eighteenth century, but was created as such upon the completion of the improved Soar Navigation between Loughborough and Leicester in 1794. The navigation involved constructing a new section of canal to by-pass a meander in the River Soar. The area enclosed by the River Soar and the canal is Frog Island. The road which crosses the island is also named 'Frog Island'.

== History ==
The island lies immediately to the south of Leicester Abbey, and historically was partly covered by the Abbey Meadows, which were too marshy for construction. In 1877, the meadows were drained and incorporated into Abbey Park.

The purpose of the Leicester Navigation was to make the River Soar navigable to commercial traffic, and particularly to allow the transportation of coal produced in the Leicestershire region. Upon the completion of the navigation in 1794, goods could be taken by boat down the Soar to the River Trent. Moreover, the opening of the Leicester to Swannington Railway in 1832 meant that the coal fields of Leicestershire were even better linked with the Soar and the Grand Union Canal, which extends as far as London. Frog Island is located at the epicentre of this connection, and as a result much of the island became highly industrialised in the nineteenth and twentieth centuries.

By the mid-twentieth century, there were several large mills on Frog Island. These manufactured clothing, machinery (particularly for the production of textiles) and materials demanded by the city's hosiery trade, such as spun wool and dyes. Frog Island had easy access to water from the river and canal, which was particularly important in the dyeing industry. It also provided water for the operation of steam- and water-powered milling equipment.

The western tip of the island was crossed by the Great Central Main Line, which linked Leicester with Sheffield and Nottingham in the north, and Marylebone station in the south. The line was closed as part of the Beeching Axe reorganisation in the 1960s. Some railway arches remain and are now used by a number of small businesses. The arches are constructed from the distinctive Staffordshire Blue bricks, and were part of the immense north viaduct which brought the line into central Leicester. Before the construction of St Margaret's Way, Slater Street provided easy access to St Margaret's Pastures and thence to Abbey Park.

== Lost industries and architecture ==
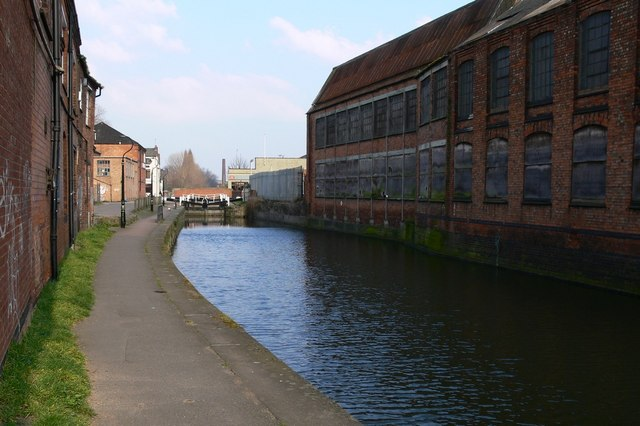
Factories by the canal, seen from Frog Island

The island's prime location at the intersection of several transport routes made it an important location for industrial activity in the nineteenth and early twentieth centuries. Several large factories were constructed, some of which still survive. However, after the second world war the city experienced a period of deindustrialisation, and many of the businesses which occupied the island have closed. Consequently, many of the large mills have become derelict, and have been damaged by vandals and by fire. Some manufacturing activity does still occur on the island, however, and some of the island's industrial features – such as the railway arches – have been repurposed for commercial use.

=== St Leonard's Works (Frisby Jarvis Building) ===
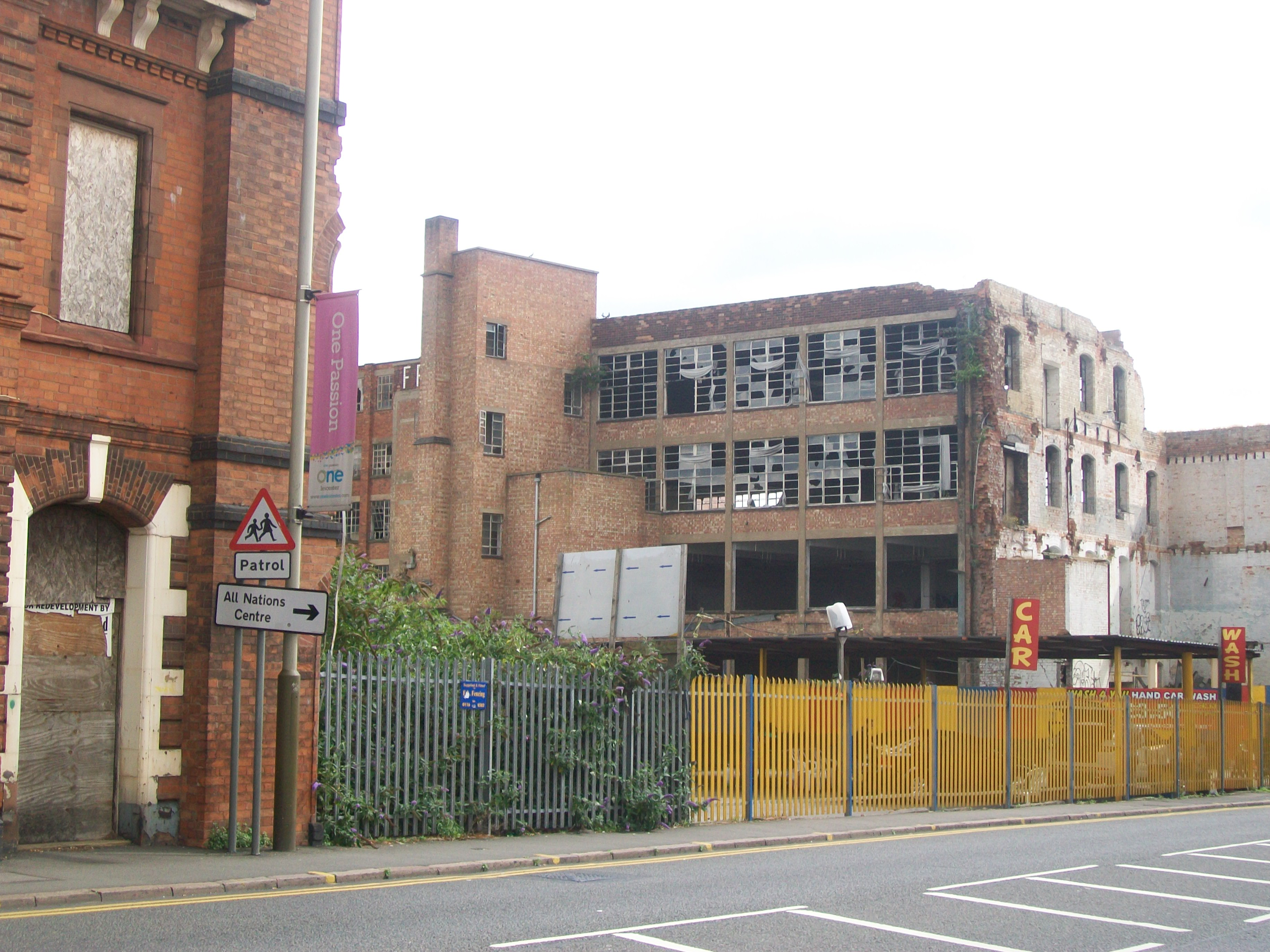
Former Frisby-Jarvis building on Frog Island, Leicester

St Leonard's Works were opened in 1867 and extended in 1881. The mill originally spun worsted, and was constructed in the Italian palazzo style. On both occasions, the building work was completed by Shenton and Baker, a local architectural practice. The quality of the mill's architecture is evidenced by the building materials employed in its construction: colour tile, dressed stone, wrought iron and extensive glazing. The effect was to produce an imposing and 'monumental' building that became an important local landmark. In 1922, the mill was taken over by Frisby, Jarvis & Co. The company was a major employer in the area. Upon the closure of Frisby Jarvis in 1992, the mill was taken over by Martins Ltd – a company which also subsequently closed.

Despite being listed in 2003, the building fell into major disrepair, and was badly damaged by fire in 2005.

=== Farben Works ===
The Farben Works was another worsted spinning mill. It was opened in 1914, and was designed by Harding and Toppott in a classical style. It is grade II listed and, with the Slater Street School and Frisby Jarvis works, forms part of a significant group of historic buildings.

=== Hitchcock's Flour Mill ===
Hitchcock's Flour Mill was constructed in the nineteenth century. It employed water power to drive its equipment, and the mill race – which is crossed by a distinctive Victorian iron bridge – still survives on the island. In 1888, it was converted to steam power. The mill was badly damaged by fire in 2011, leading to its partial demolition.

=== Stephenson's Lifting Bridge ===
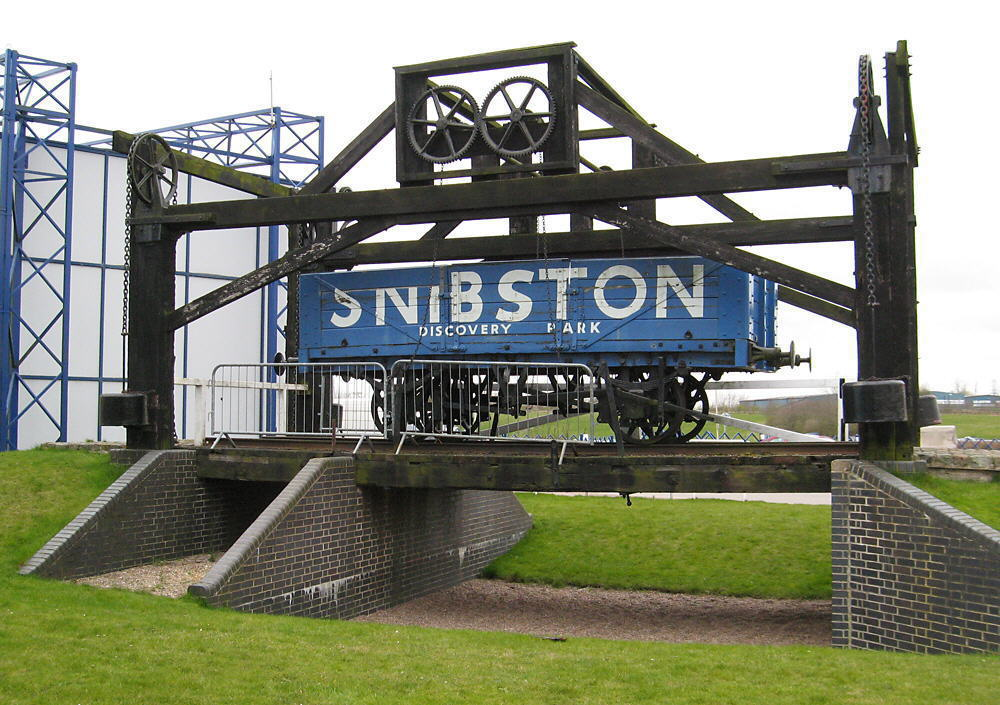
Stephenson's Lifting Bridge, when it was an exhibit at Snibston

The island was also the location of Stephenson's Lifting Bridge, which carried the Swannington Railway over the Soar Navigation. The bridge was designed by Robert Stephenson, and careful counterbalancing allowed it to be operated by hand from a booth at the side of the canal. It was removed in the mid-twentieth century, became an exhibit at Snibston Discovery Museum until that museum's closure and is now at the Mountsorrel & Rothley Community Heritage Centre where it is being rebuilt.

== Leisure and culture ==
Next to the canal is 'Stayfree Music' – band rehearsal rooms and 'Lock 42' – a live music venue and bar. The Foresters Public House continues to operate. The North Bridge Tavern is currently in private residence.

A disability arts charity, 27a Access Artspace, moved into an unused car showroom on Northgate Street at the beginning of 2008. The West End Gallery also moved to Highcross Street, and an old mill building just by the canal is occasionally used by artists to host exhibitions and art events.

== Education ==
Slater Primary School stands in the centre of Frog Island. It serves the Woodgate and Tudor Road areas: there is little or no residential accommodation on Frog Island itself. Leicester City Council's street lighting depot is situated on Slater Street.
