= List of local nature reserves in Leicestershire =

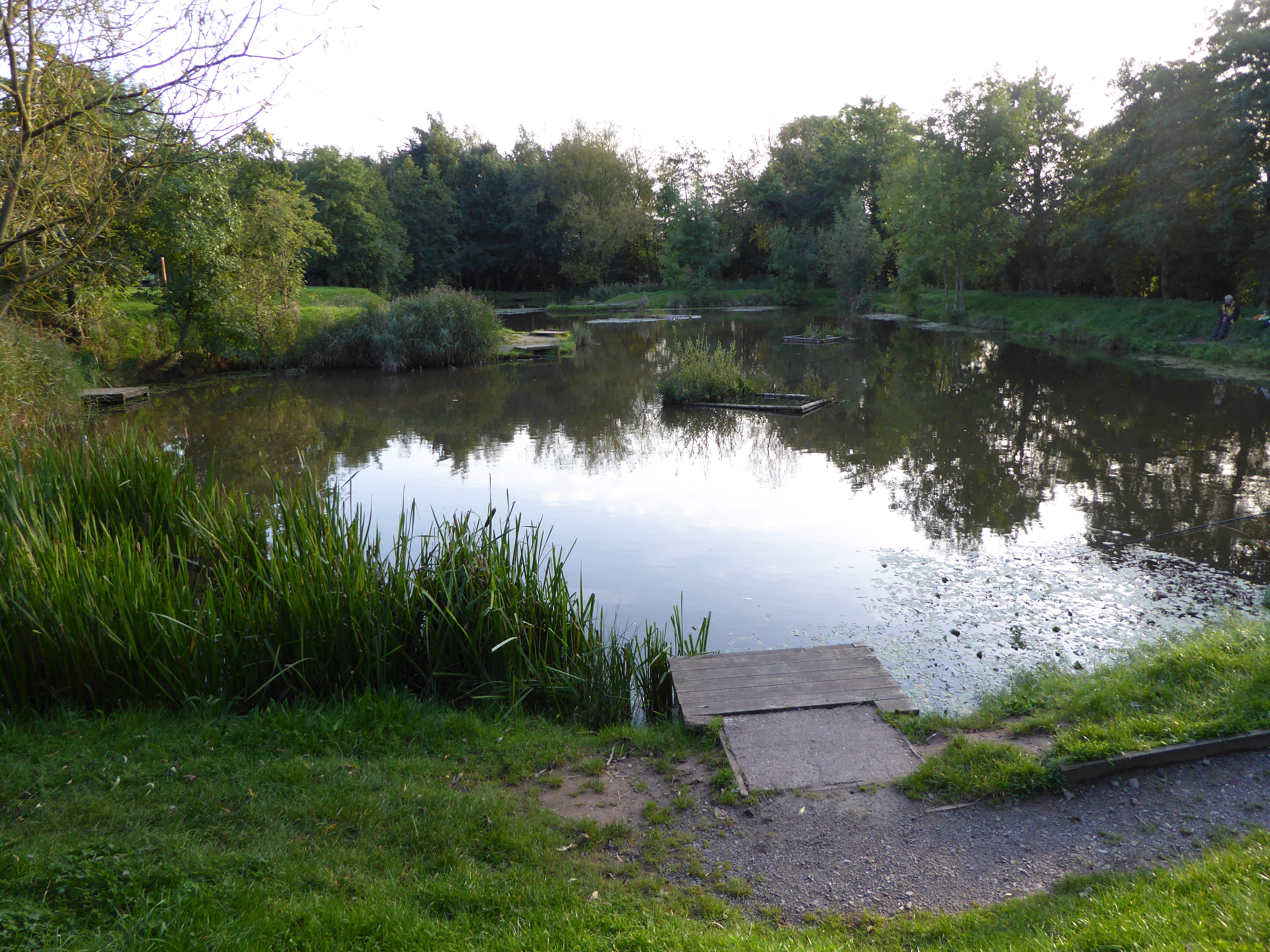
Snibston Grange was formerly the garden of the local colliery manager.

Leicestershire is a county in the East Midlands of England. The area of the administrative county is 806 square miles (2,090 km^{2}) and the population according to the 2011 census is 980,000. Leicester City Council is a unitary authority, and the rest of the county is administered by Leicestershire County Council at the top level, with seven district councils in the second tier, Blaby, Charnwood, Harborough, Hinckley and Bosworth, Melton, North West Leicestershire and Oadby and Wigston.

Local nature reserves (LNRs) are designated by local authorities under the National Parks and Access to the Countryside Act 1949. The local authority must have a legal control over the site, by owning or leasing it or having an agreement with the owner. LNRs are sites which have a special local interest either biologically or geologically, and local authorities have a duty to care for them. They can apply local bye-laws to manage and protect LNRs.

As of December 2017, there are 23 local nature reserves in the county. The largest is Burbage Common and Woods at 85 hectares (210 acres), where over 300 species of flowering plants, 250 of fungi, 100 of birds, 20 of butterflies and 15 of damselflies and dragonflies have been recorded. The smallest is Lucas Marsh with 1.5 hectares (3.7 acres), a former quarry which is part of Brock's Hill Country Park. All sites are open to the public, apart from Knighton Spinney, which is only accessible on occasional open days.

== Key ==
=== Other classifications ===
- LRWT = Leicestershire and Rutland Wildlife Trust
- SSSI = Site of Special Scientific Interest

== Sites ==
Site	Photograph	Area (Note: The area is taken from the Natural England map of each site. (Click on the identify icon (i) in the "Feature Tools" and then click on the site.))	Location (Note: Unless otherwise stated, the location is taken from the Natural England details page for the site.)	District	Other classifications	Map (Note: The maps are on the Natural England database of local nature reserves.)	Details (Note: Details are on the pages on each site in the Natural England database of local nature reserves.)	Description
Aylestone Meadows	Aylestone Meadows	8.8 hectares (22 acres)	Leicester; 52.608°N 1.158°W; SK 571 015	Blaby		Map	Details	This is the largest area of open space in Leicester. It has species-rich meadows which are grazed by longhorn cattle, and wild fauna include otters and kingfishers.
Billa Barra Hill	Billa Barra Hill	20.7 hectares (51 acres)	Stanton under Bardon; 52.698°N 1.312°W; SK 466 114	Hinckley and Bosworth		Map	Details	The top of the hill is a former quarry, leaving exposed rocks which provide a habitat for a variety of mosses and lichens. Lower down there are areas of acid grassland, and locally sourced trees have been planted on the lower slopes.
Birstall Meadows	Birstall Meadows	15.6 hectares (39 acres)	Birstall; 52.683°N 1.105°W; SK 606 099	Leicester		Map	Details	These meadows on the bank of the River Soar are flower-rich damp grassland. They are grazed by horses and cattle, and there are large areas of open water which provide a winter feeding ground for waterfowl.
Bishop's Meadow	Bishop's Meadow	21.8 hectares (54 acres)	Loughborough; 52.792°N 1.217°W; SK 529 219	Charnwood		Map	Details	This area of grassland, swamp and fen has mature beech trees, a diverse flora, fungi and bryophytes. The Grand Union Canal runs along its southern boundary.
Burbage Common and Woods	Burbage Common	85.0 hectares (210 acres)	Hinckley; 52.549°N 1.339°W; SP 449 948	Hinckley and Bosworth	SSSI	Map	Details	These semi-natural woods on poorly drained soils are dominated by ash and oak. Hazel and hawthorn are common in the shrub layer, and there are flowers such as sweet woodruff and water avens. The common is unimproved grassland with some areas of heath.
Glen Parva	Glen Parva	11.9 hectares (29 acres)	Blaby; 52.588°N 1.173°W; SP 561 992	Blaby		Map	Details	The Grand Union Canal runs along the western side of this site, which also has a pond, wet and neutral grassland, woodland, scrub and hedges.
Goss Meadows	Goss Meadows	2.8 hectares (6.9 acres)	Leicester; 52.655°N 1.165°W; SK 566 067	Leicester		Map	Details	This is a long narrow strip along the western side of Anstey Lane. It is woodland and grassland, which has some uncommon wild flowers, such as spiny restharrow.
Halstead Road Centenary Pasture	Halstead Road Centenary Pasture	3.2 hectares (7.9 acres)	Mountsorrel; 52.722°N 1.153°W; SK 573 141	Charnwood		Map	Details	This unimproved flower meadow has surviving medieval ridge and furrow. An outcrop of granite is covered with lichens and mosses, and there is a hawthorn and sloe hedge. Birds include yellowhammers and linnets.
Humberstone Park LNR	Humberstone Park	2.4 hectares (5.9 acres)	Leicester; 52.638°N 1.088°W; SK 618 049	Leicester		Map	Details	The nature reserve is part of Humberstone Park. It has diverse fauna and flora, and there is a sunken garden and a former railway embankment called Rally Bank.
Kirby Frith	Kirby Frith	2.1 hectares (5.2 acres)	Leicester; 52.636°N 1.204°W; SK 540 045	Leicester		Map	Details	This site is described by Natural England as the richest wildflower grassland in the county, with species such as devil's-bit scabious, betony and yellow rattle. Butterflies include speckled woods and meadow browns.
Knighton Spinney	Knighton Spinney	2.9 hectares (7.2 acres)	Leicester; 52.602°N 1.108°W; SK 605 008	Leicester		Map	Details	This oak and ash plantation is part of Knighton Park. Flora include wood anemones, and there are birds such as nuthatches, treecreepers and great spotted woodpeckers.
Lucas Marsh	Lucas Marsh	1.5 hectares (3.7 acres)	Oadby; 52.592°N 1.085°W; SP 621 997	Oadby and Wigston	LRWT	Map	Details	The marsh is dominated by greater willowherb and common reed, while there are also areas of rough grassland, a hedge, trees and scrub. Butterflies include small tortoiseshell, speckled wood, peacock and orange tip.
Moira Junction	Moira Junction	3.5 hectares (8.6 acres)	Moira; 52.739°N 1.150°W; SK 305 158	North West Leicestershire		Map	Details	This is part of the former Overseal railway sidings, which closed in 1966 and was developed as a nature area in 1991. It has two lakes, birch woodland and heath grassland.
Morley Quarry	Morley Quarry	3.1 hectares (7.7 acres)	Shepshed; 52.757°N 1.296°W; SK 476 179	Charnwood		Map	Details	The quarries are a Regionally Important Geological Site, with rocks dating to 600 million years ago. The habitat is grassland and heath, with heather and gorse. There is a pond which has breeding toads.
Nature Alive	Nature Alive	5.7 hectares (14 acres)	Coalville; 52.732°N 1.375°W; SK 423 151	North West Leicestershire		Map	Details	This site was formerly a coal stocking yard for Snibston Colliery, and it now has diverse habitats such as woodland, ponds, a wildflower meadow, rough pasture and hedges. Fauna include water voles and great crested newts.
New Lount	New Lount	21.3 hectares (53 acres)	Newbold Coleorton; 52.759°N 1.416°W; SK 395 181	North West Leicestershire		Map	Details	This site has a diverse bird population, such as green woodpeckers, chiffchaffs, blackcaps, willow warblers and goldcrests. Common and soprano pipistrelle bats catch insects over the site's four ponds.
North Kilworth	North Kilworth	2.0 hectares (4.9 acres)	North Kilworth; 52.443°N 1.094°W; SP 617 832	Harborough		Map	Details	This site, which is part of North Kilworth Millennium Green, has a wildflower meadow, a moat with boardwalks and a paddock.
The Orchards	The Orchards	6.6 hectares (16 acres)	Leicester; 52.651°N 1.165°W; SK 566 063	Leicester		Map	Details	This was formerly allotments. It has diverse habitats of damp and dry grassland, mature trees, scrub, and a pond which has many newts, frogs and toads.
Reedbed Local Nature Reserve	Reedbed	14.3 hectares (35 acres)	Leicester; 52.694°N 1.108°W; SK 604 111	Leicester		Map	Details	This site, which is in the floodplain of the River Soar, is part of Watermead Country Park. It has lakes, reedbeds, woods, marshes and grassland. Breeding birds include reed warblers, sand martins and song thrushes.
Saltersford Wood	Saltersford Wood	5.7 hectares (14 acres)	Oakthorpe; 52.718°N 1.525°W; SK 322 135	North West Leicestershire		Map	Details	This site has native woodland, hay meadows and areas of open water. These are called "flashes", and are the result of the flooding of Saltersford Brook caused by mining subsidence.
Scraptoft	Scraptoft	14.3 hectares (35 acres)	Scraptoft; 52.649°N 1.044°W; SK 648 061	Leicester		Map	Details	This former Second World War prisoner of war camp has habitats including a pond, semi-improved grassland and mature hawthorn scrub. Scraptoft Brook runs along the southern boundary.
Snibston Grange	Snibston Grange	3.2 hectares (7.9 acres)	Coalville; 52.719°N 1.386°W; SK 416 137	North West Leicestershire		Map	Details	This was formerly the garden of the local colliery manager, and is now part of Snibston Country Park. It has two fishing lakes, a Victorian arboretum with a wide variety of mature trees, a wetland area and a wildflower meadow.
Watermead Country Park South	Watermead Country Park South	49.0 hectares (121 acres)	Leicester; 52.666°N 1.117°W; SK 598 080	Leicester		Map	Details	The River Soar runs through this site, which also has a lake. Natural England describes it as "one of the most important wildlife sites in the city".

== See also ==
- List of Sites of Special Scientific Interest in Leicestershire
- Leicestershire and Rutland Wildlife Trust
