= John Hannah (VC) =

Recipient of the Victoria Cross

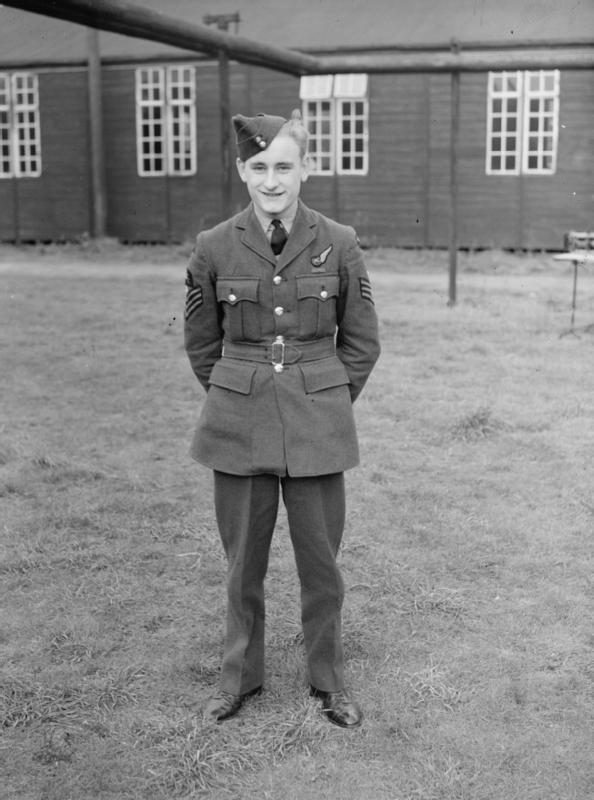
- Sergeant John Hannah c. 1940
- Born: 27 November 1921; Paisley, Scotland
- Died: 7 June 1947 (aged 25); Markfield, Leicestershire, England
- Burial place: St James Churchyard, Birstall, Leicestershire
- Military career
- Allegiance: United Kingdom
- Branch: Royal Air Force
- Service years: 1939–1942
- Rank: Flight Sergeant
- Service number: 652918
- Units: No. 83 Squadron
- Conflicts: Second World War
- Awards: Victoria Cross

John Hannah, VC (27 November 1921 – 7 June 1947) was a Scottish airman and a recipient of the Victoria Cross, the highest award for gallantry in the face of the enemy that can be awarded to British and Commonwealth forces.

== Early life ==
Born in Paisley and educated at Bankhead Primary School and Victoria Drive Secondary School, Glasgow, Hannah joined the Royal Air Force (RAF) in 1939. After training as a wireless operator was promoted to sergeant in 1940. He was posted to No. 83 Squadron, flying Handley Page Hampden bombers as a wireless operator/gunner.

== Victoria Cross ==
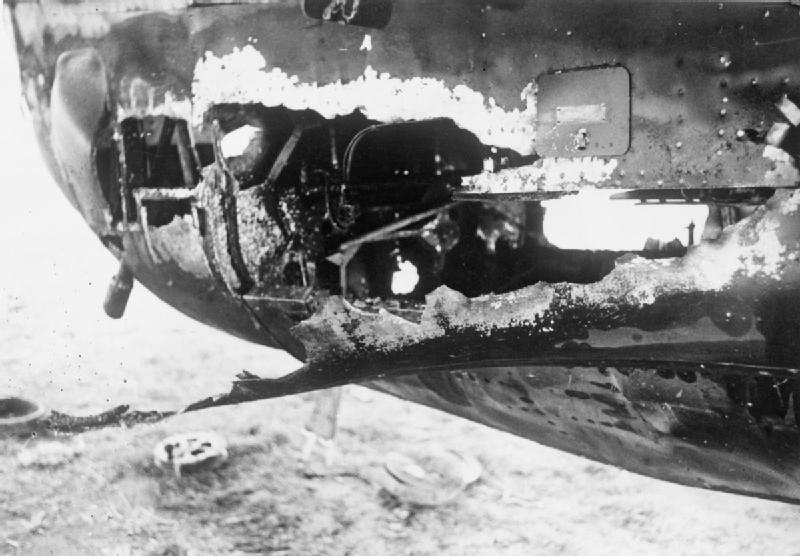
The remains of the gunner's compartment on Hannah's Hampden

On 15 September 1940 over Antwerp, Belgium, after a successful attack on German barges, the Handley Page Hampden bomber (serial P1355) in which Sergeant Hannah was wireless operator/air gunner, was subjected to intense anti-aircraft fire, starting a fire which spread quickly. The rear gunner and navigator had to bale out and Sergeant Hannah could have acted likewise, but instead he remained to fight the fire, first with two extinguishers and then with his bare hands. He sustained terrible injuries, but succeeded in putting out the fire and the pilot was able to bring the almost wrecked aircraft back safely.

The Canadian pilot of the aircraft, Flying Officer Clare Connor, recommended Hannah receive the Victoria Cross. Connor himself was awarded the Distinguished Flying Cross. King George VI presented the decorations to Hannah and Connor at an investiture in Buckingham Palace.

Eighteen years old at the time of his Victoria Cross action, Hannah was the youngest recipient of the medal for aerial operations and the youngest for the Second World War.

=== Victoria Cross citation ===
The announcement and accompanying citation for the Victoria Cross was published in supplement to the London Gazette on 1 October 1940, reading

The KING has been graciously pleased to confer the VICTORIA CROSS on the undermentioned officer in recognition of most conspicuous bravery :-

652918 Sergeant John Hannah :-

On the night of 15th September, 1940, Sergeant Hannah was the wireless operator/air gunner in an aircraft engaged in a successful attack on an enemy barge concentration at Antwerp. It was then subjected to intense anti-aircraft fire and received a direct hit from a projectile of an explosive and incendiary nature, which apparently burst inside the bomb compartment.

A fire started which quickly enveloped the wireless operators and rear gunners cockpits, and as both the port and starboard petrol tanks had been pierced, there was grave risk of the fire spreading. Sergeant Hannah forced his way through to obtain two extinguishers and discovered that the rear gunner had had to leave the aircraft. He could have acted likewise, through the bottom escape hatch or forward through the navigators hatch, but remained and fought the fire for ten minutes with the extinguishers, beating the flames with his log book when these were empty.

During this time thousands of rounds of ammunition exploded in all directions and he was almost blinded by the intense heat and fumes, but had the presence of mind to obtain relief by turning on his oxygen supply. Air admitted through the large holes caused by the projectile made the bomb compartment an inferno and all the aluminium sheet metal on the floor of this airman's cockpit was melted away, leaving only the cross bearers.

Working under these conditions, which caused burns to his face and eyes, Sergeant Hannah succeeded in extinguishing the fire. He then crawled forward, ascertained that the navigator had left the aircraft, and passed the latter's log and maps to the pilot. This airman displayed courage, coolness and devotion to duty of the highest order and by his action in remaining and successfully extinguishing the fire under conditions of the greatest danger and difficulty, enabled the pilot to bring the aircraft to its base.

== Later life and death ==
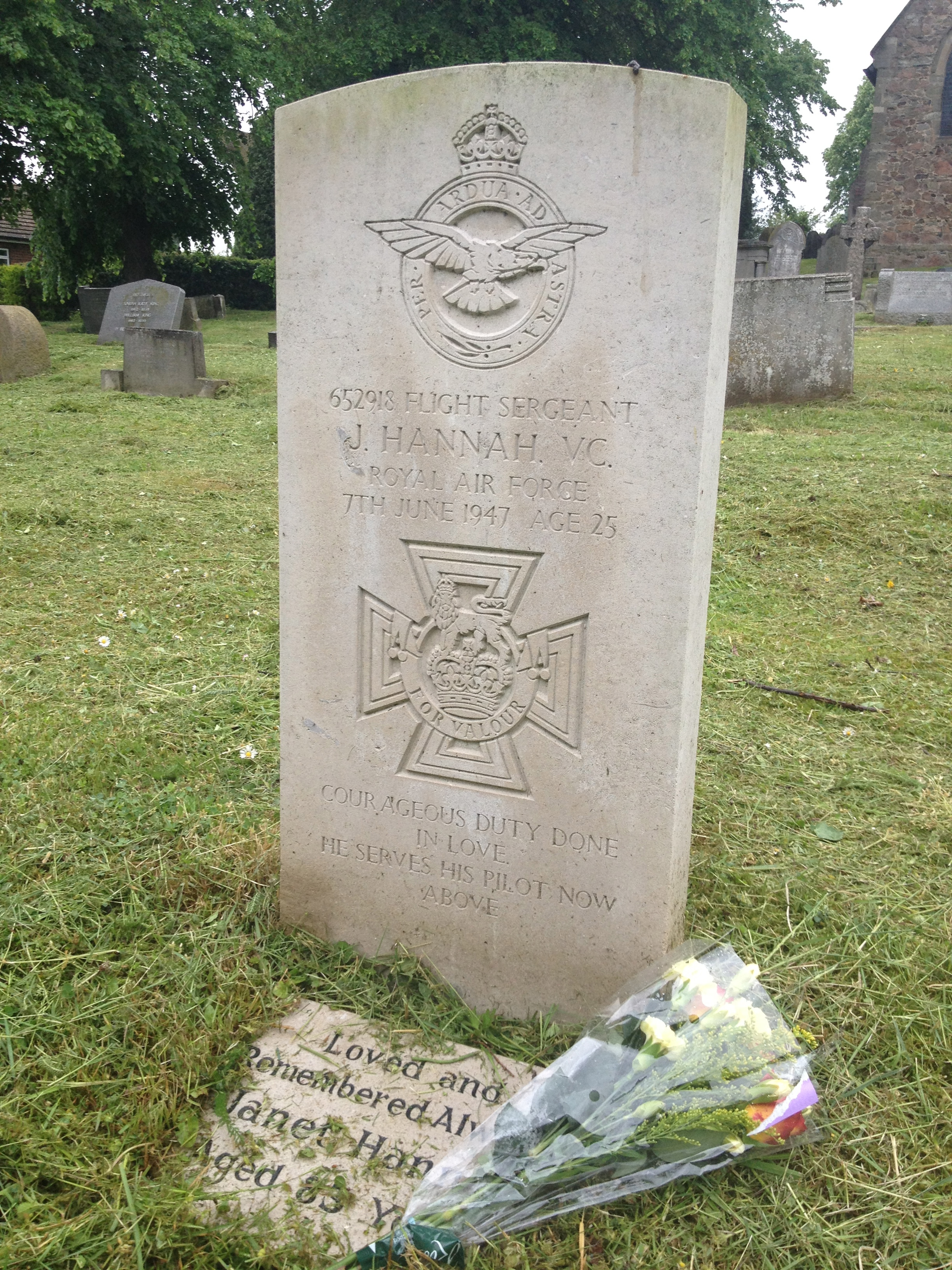
The Grave of John Hannah

Hannah contracted tuberculosis only a year later in mid-late 1941; it is likely that his weakened condition following the severe burns he sustained during his Victoria Cross action undermined his resistance to infection. His illness necessitated his eventual discharge from the RAF, with full disability pension, in December 1942. However, unable thereafter to take up a full-time job, he initially took a job as a taxi driver (using a car his aunt had lent him) but due to increasing ill health he returned the car in 1943. He then found it increasingly difficult to support his wife and three small daughters, and his health ultimately gave out. He died on 7 June 1947 at Markfield Sanatorium in Leicester, where he had been lying for four months. He is buried in the churchyard of St James the Great Church, Church Hill, Birstall, north Leicester. His wife, Janet Hannah, is also interred there with her husband. An inscription to her reads "Loved and remembered always Janet Hannah Aged 83 years".

Hannah's headstone is inscribed: "Courageous Duty Done In Love, He Serves His Pilot Now Above." His Victoria Cross is displayed at the Royal Air Force Museum, Hendon, London.
