= Birstall Meadows =

Nature reserve in Leicestershire, England

Coordinates: 52.683°N 1.105°W

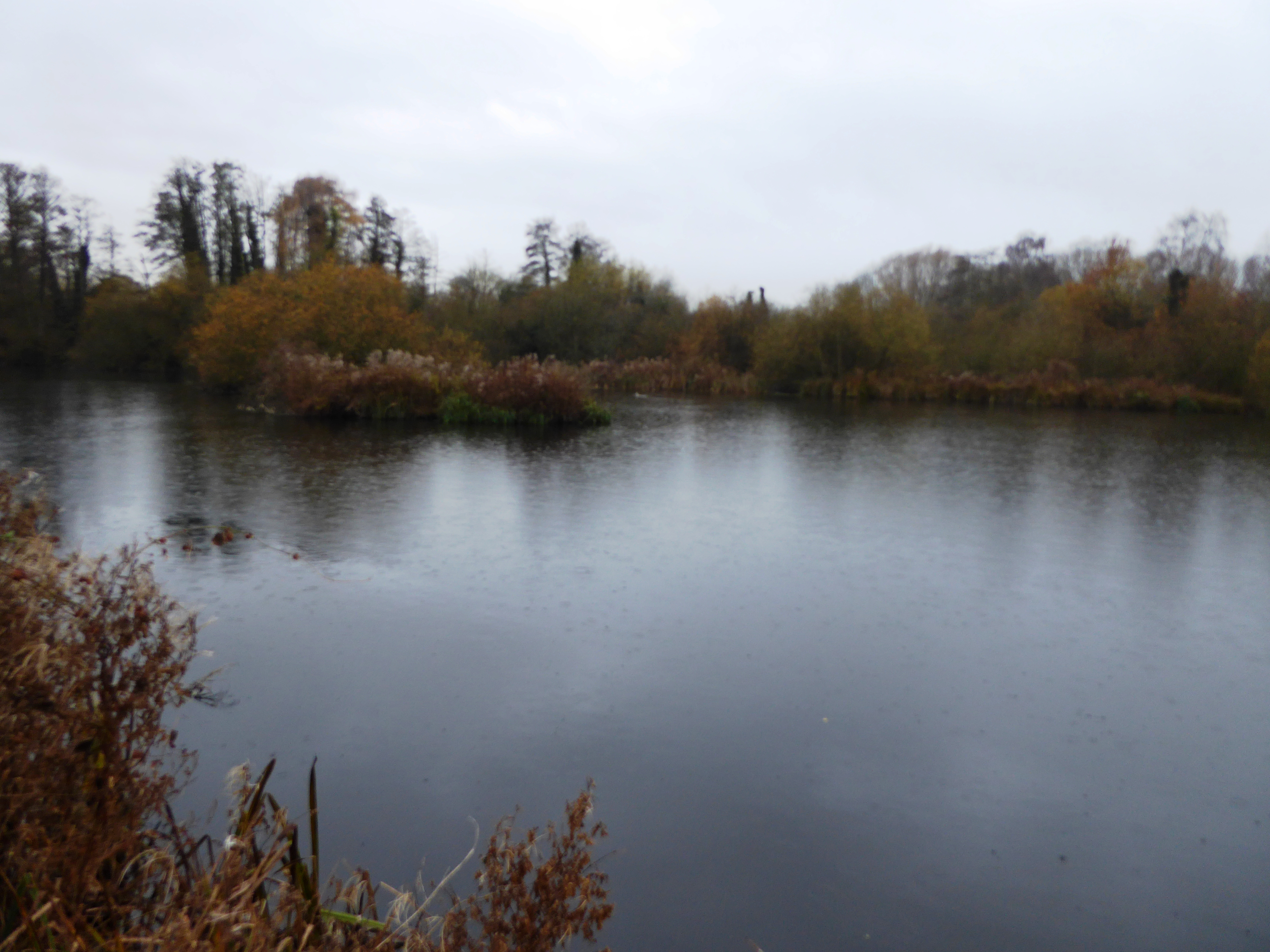
- Interactive map of Birstall Meadows
- Type: Local Nature Reserve
- Location: Birstall, Leicestershire
- OS grid: SK 606 099
- Area: 15.6 hectares (39 acres)
- Manager: Leicester City Council

Birstall Meadows is a 15.6 hectares (39 acres) Local Nature Reserve east of Birstall in Leicestershire. It is part of Watermead Country Park, and is owned and managed by Leicester City Council.

These meadows on the bank of the River Soar are flower-rich damp grassland. They are grazed by horses and cattle, and they have large areas of open water which provide a winter feeding ground for waterfowl.

There is access from a footpath on the east bank of the River Soar.
