= No. 83 Squadron RAF =

Defunct flying squadron of the Royal Air Force

- Active: 7 January 1917 – 31 December 1919; 4 August 1936 – 31 December 1955; 21 May 1957 – 31 August 1969
- Country: United Kingdom
- Branch: Royal Air Force
- Role: Bomber
- Motto: "Strike to Defend"

Insignia
- Squadron badge heraldry: An attire, sable.The red deer's antler is in reference to the squadron's association with Scotland. The attire has six points commemorating an outstanding occasion in the First World War when six DFCs were awarded for one extremely valuable reconnaissance operation -successfully completed by six individuals in three aircraft during 14/15 June 1918. They were the only Allied aircraft in the air in weather which had grounded all others. The antler in black affords reference to night flying and the three top points stand for the crown of success met with by the squadron.
- Squadron codes: QQ Allocated Nov 1938 - Sep 1939; OL Sep 1939 - Apr 1951; AS To be used for visit to Chile in 1946, changed to GB; GB Used on aircraft for visit to Chile - October 1946

Aircraft flown
- Bomber: FE2b, FE2d (1917–1919); Hawker Hind (1936–1938); Handley Page Hampden (1938–1941); Avro Manchester (1941–1942); Avro Lancaster (1942–1945); Avro Lincoln (1946–1955); Avro Vulcan (1957–1969)

No. 83 Squadron RAF was a Royal Flying Corps and Royal Air Force squadron active from 1917 until 1969. It operated during both the First World War and the Second World War.

== Establishment and early service ==
Founded on 7 January 1917 at Montrose, 83 Squadron trained at RAF Spitalgate and RAF Wyton, where it equipped with Royal Aircraft Factory F.E.2bs and F.E.2ds for its role as a night bomber squadron. The squadron moved to France in March 1918 and attacked German troop concentrations to try to disrupt the German spring offensive, before operating for the remainder of the war on night bombing (mainly against railway targets) and reconnaissance operations. The squadron was disbanded on 31 December 1919.

== Reinstatement and Second World War ==
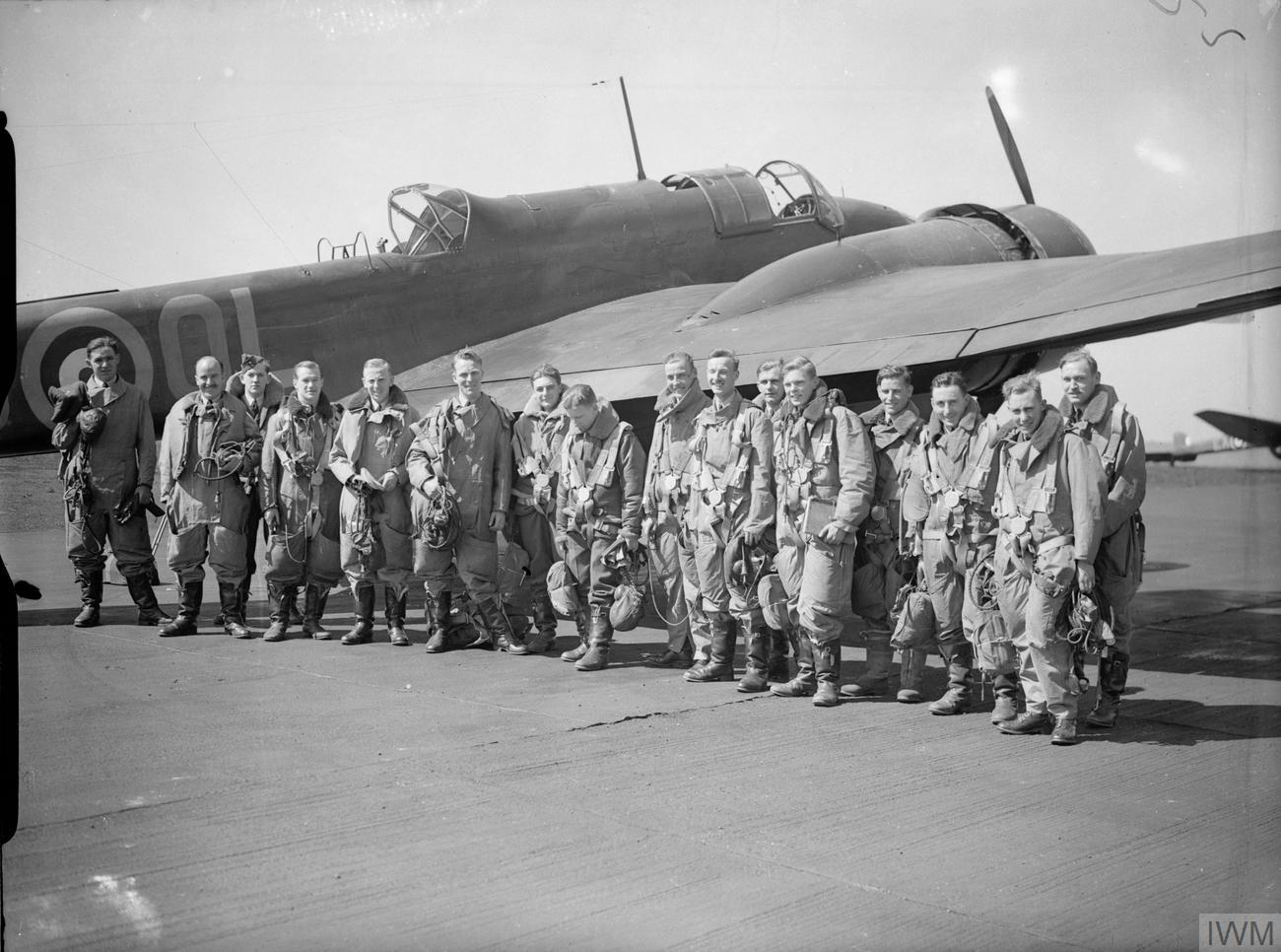
83 Squadron aircrew in front of a Handley Page Hampden at RAF Scampton

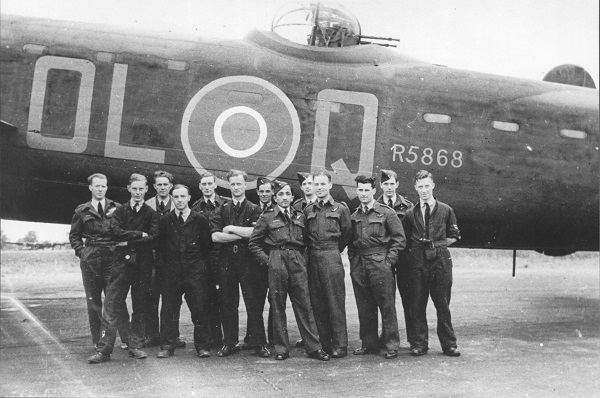
83 Squadron aircrew in front of their Lancaster R5868, Squadron Leader Shailendra Eknath Sukthankar, an Indian Navigator stands in the middle.

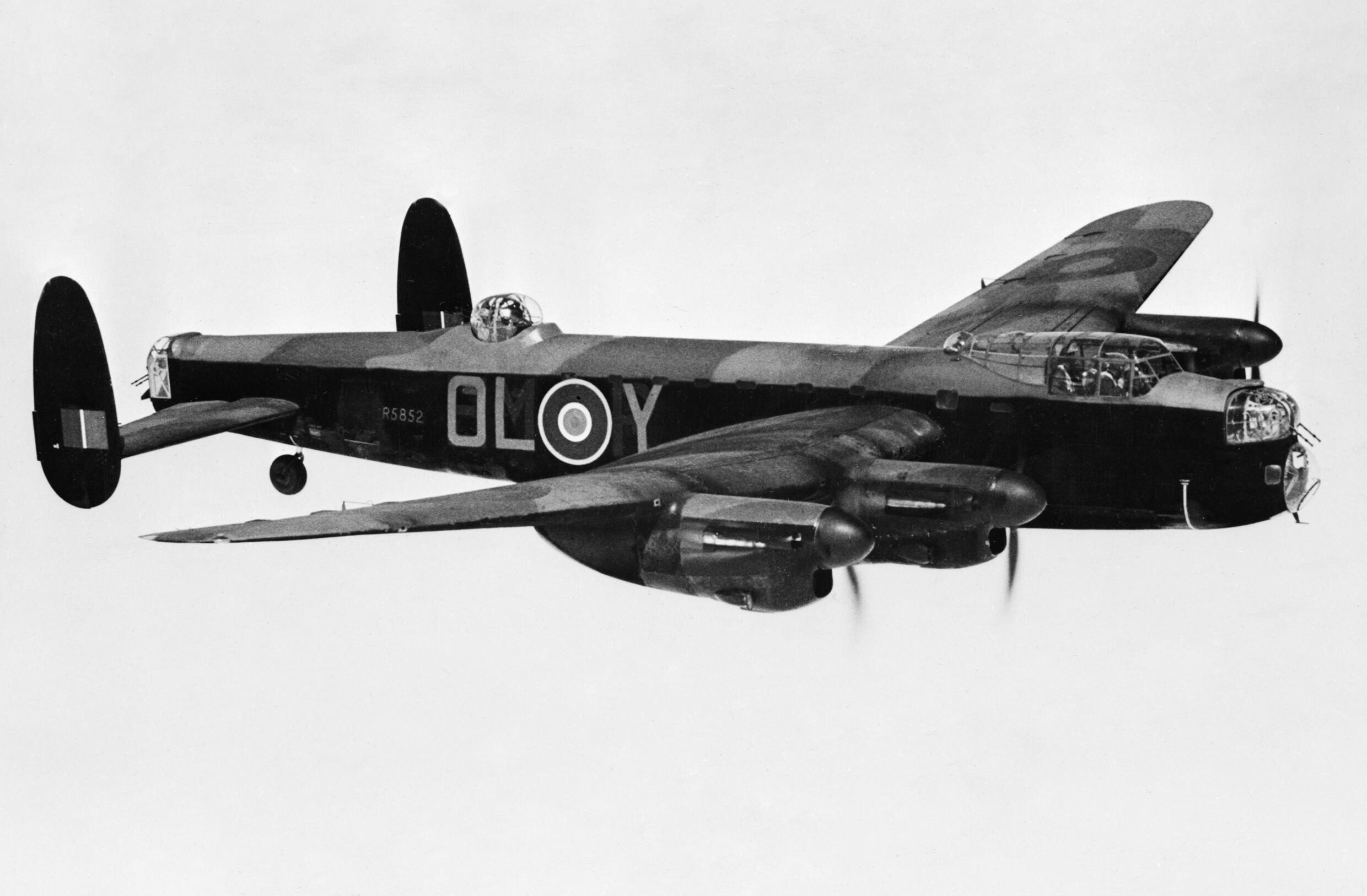
An 83 Sqn Lancaster B.I, in 1942.

83 Squadron re-formed at RAF Turnhouse in Scotland on 4 August 1936, equipped with Hawker Hinds for day bombing as part of 2 Group. On 14 March 1938, the squadron joined No 5 Group at Scampton and re-equipped with Handley Page Hampdens in October 1938.

Unlike many Bomber Command squadrons, 83 Squadron went into action on the first day of the Second World War, carrying out a sweep over the North Sea looking for German warships. The squadron continued with 'precision' raids against German naval and coastal targets but as the daylight operations became more costly, Bomber Command switched to night operations. The squadron flew against concentrations of invasion shipping in the Channel Ports in the late summer and autumn of 1940, with a raid on Antwerp on the night of 15 September resulting in the award of a Victoria Cross to Flight Sergeant John Hannah, a wireless operator and gunner for extinguishing a serious fire while receiving severe burns. In December 1941, the squadron was re-equipped with Avro Manchesters but due to their underpowered and unreliable engines these were quickly replaced by Avro Lancasters.

In August 1942, the squadron was transferred to the No 8 Group Pathfinder Force at RAF Wyton, operating as a marker unit for the main force of Bomber Command. In April 1944, 83 Squadron was returned to No 5 Group at RAF Coningsby, where it became the Pathfinder unit for independent operations by the Group.

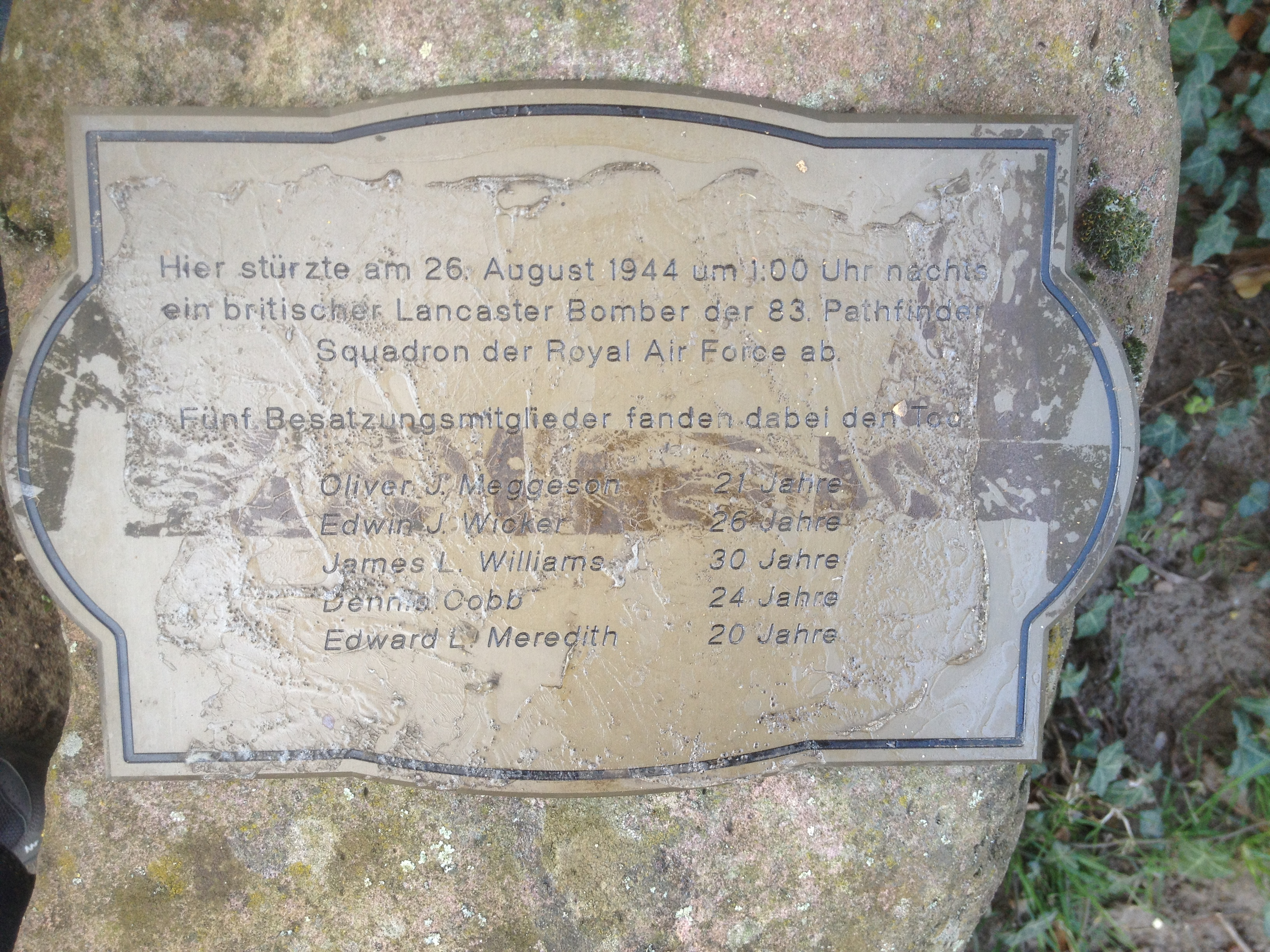
Small Memorial Stone for the killed crew of a shot-down Lancaster of 83 (Pathfinder) Squadron. in Heusenstamm, Germany

== Post-Second World War and disbandment ==
In May 1946, the squadron re-equipped with Avro Lincolns, relocating in October to RAF Hemswell. It deployed to Singapore in September 1953, flying bombing missions against the supposed hiding places of Communist insurgents during the Malayan Emergency, returning to Hemswell in January, where it remained until disbanding again in December 1955.

In May 1957, the squadron re-formed at RAF Waddington as the RAF's first Avro Vulcan squadron. In August 1960, it handed over its Mk1 aircraft to 44 Squadron and moved to RAF Scampton where it became the first squadron to receive the Vulcan Mk2. Initially these were armed with Yellow Sun nuclear weapons, later to be replaced by Blue Steel stand-off bombs. The squadron remained at Scampton in this role until finally disbanded in August 1969.

== Bibliography ==
- Rawlings, J.D.R. "Squadron Histories:No.83". Air Pictorial, August 1961. pp. 236–237, 250.
