= Billa Barra Hill =

Nature reserve in Leicestershire, England

Coordinates: 52.698°N 1.312°W

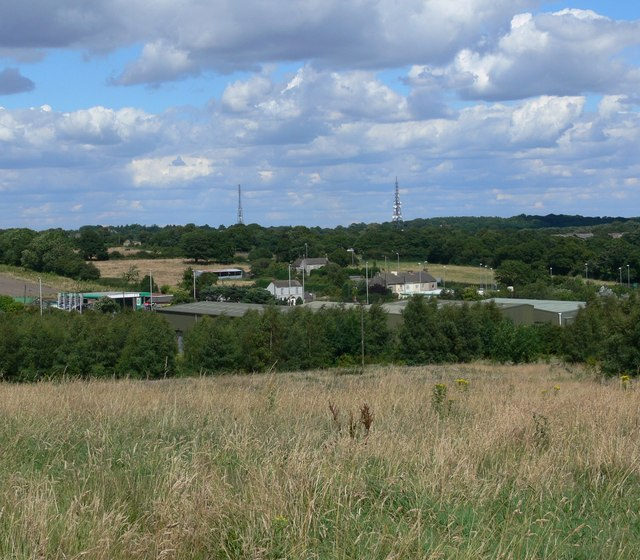
- Interactive map of Billa Barra Hill
- Type: Local Nature Reserve
- Location: Stanton under Bardon, Leicestershire
- OS grid: SK 466 114
- Area: 20.7 hectares (51 acres)
- Manager: Hinckley and Bosworth Borough Council

Billa Barra Hill is a 20.7 hectares (51 acres) Local Nature Reserve north of Stanton under Bardon in Leicestershire. It is owned and managed by Hinckley and Bosworth Borough Council.

The top of the hill is a former quarry, leaving exposed rocks which provide a habitat for a variety of mosses and lichens. Lower down there are areas of acid grassland, and locally sourced trees have been planted on the lower slopes.

There is access from Billa Barra Lane.
