= Red Hill filling station =

Grade II listed building near Leicester, England

Coordinates: 52.667664°N 1.12965°W

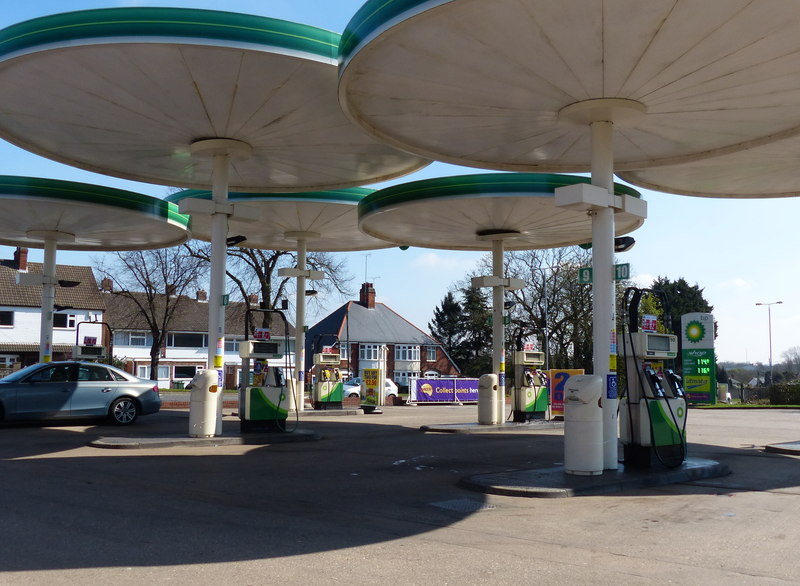
Red Hill filling station

The Red Hill filling station on the west of the A6, Loughborough Road, approximately 300 metres (980 ft) north of Red Hill Circle in Birstall near Leicester, became a Grade II listed building in 2012.

The petrol filling station is an example of the futuristic "Pegasus" design created by Eliot Noyes for Mobil in the mid-1960s. Noyes may have been inspired by the design by Danish architect Arne Jacobsen for Skovshoved Petrol Station in 1936, German designer Lothar Götz’s new garage in Wiesbaden from the 1950s, and the distinctive forecourt fittings used by Agip in Italy in the 1960s. The flexible format originally included circular canopies, illuminated from below and supported by tapered central pylons, covering cylindrical steel and black petrol pumps on the garage forecourt, accompanied by a simple brick office, and minimal signage other than the Mobil red Pegasus logo. It was designed to be instantly distinctive and recognisable as a Mobil garage, without distracting signs or poles, and was used on nearly 20,000 new and refurbished filling stations around the world until the 1980s. Changes in ownership meant that eventually many were operated by petrol companies other than Mobil.

The six remaining circular canopies at the garage in Leicester, now operated by BP, are thought to be the last surviving examples in the UK.
