= Snibston Grange =

Nature reserve in Leicestershire, England

Coordinates: 52.719°N 1.386°W

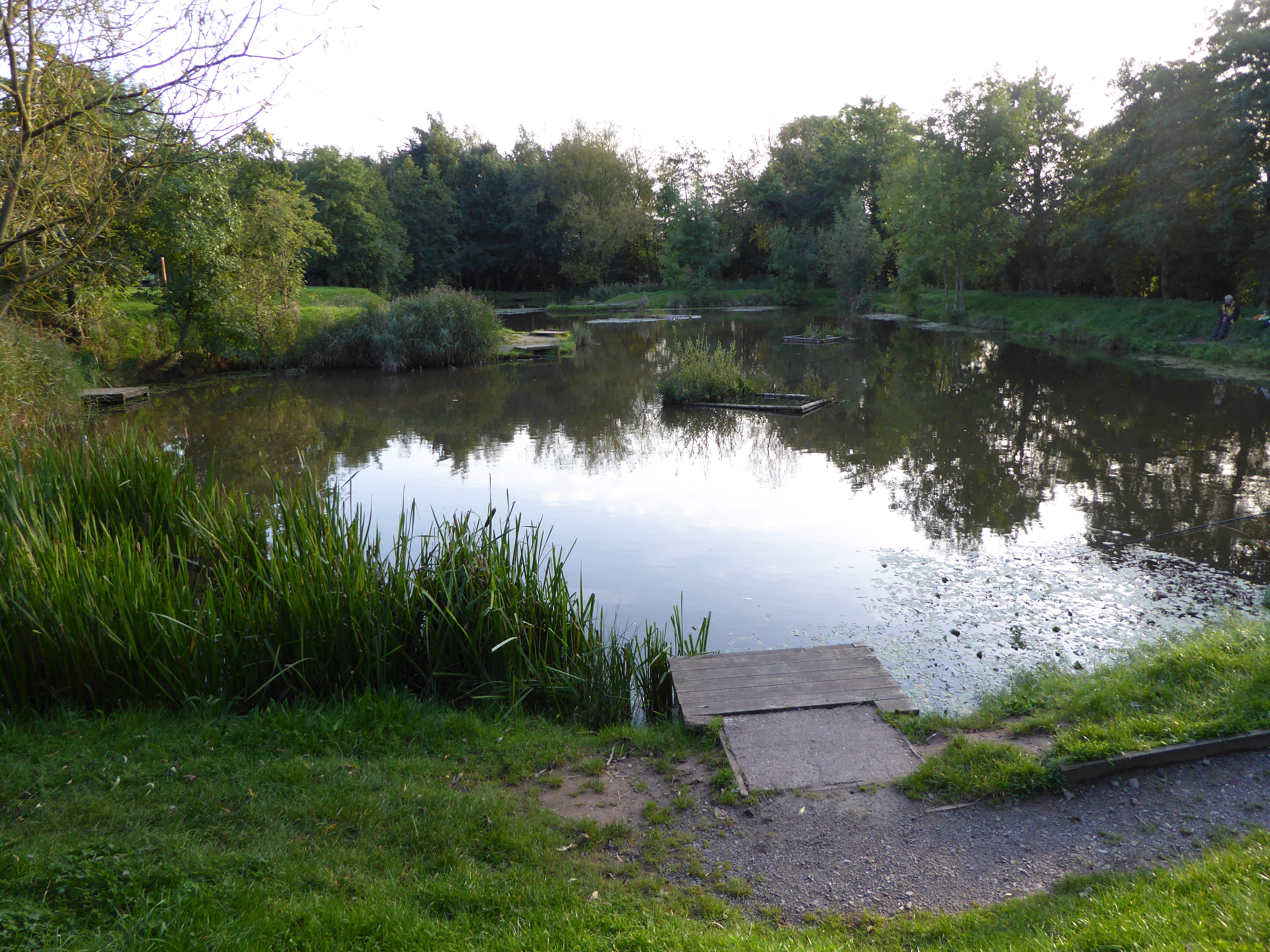
- Interactive map of Snibston Grange
- Type: Local Nature Reserve
- Location: Coalville, Leicestershire
- OS grid: SK 416 137
- Area: 3.2 hectares (7.9 acres)
- Manager: Leicestershire County Council

Snibston Grange is a 3.2 hectare Local Nature Reserve on the western outskirts of Coalville in Leicestershire. It is owned and managed by Leicestershire County Council.

This was formerly the garden of the local colliery manager, and is now part of Snibston Country Park. It has two fishing lakes, a Victorian arboretum with a wide variety of mature trees, a wetland area and a wildflower meadow.

There is access by footpaths from Coalville and Ravenstone.
