= Halstead Road Centenary Pasture =

Nature reserve in Leicestershire, England

Coordinates: 52.722°N 1.153°W

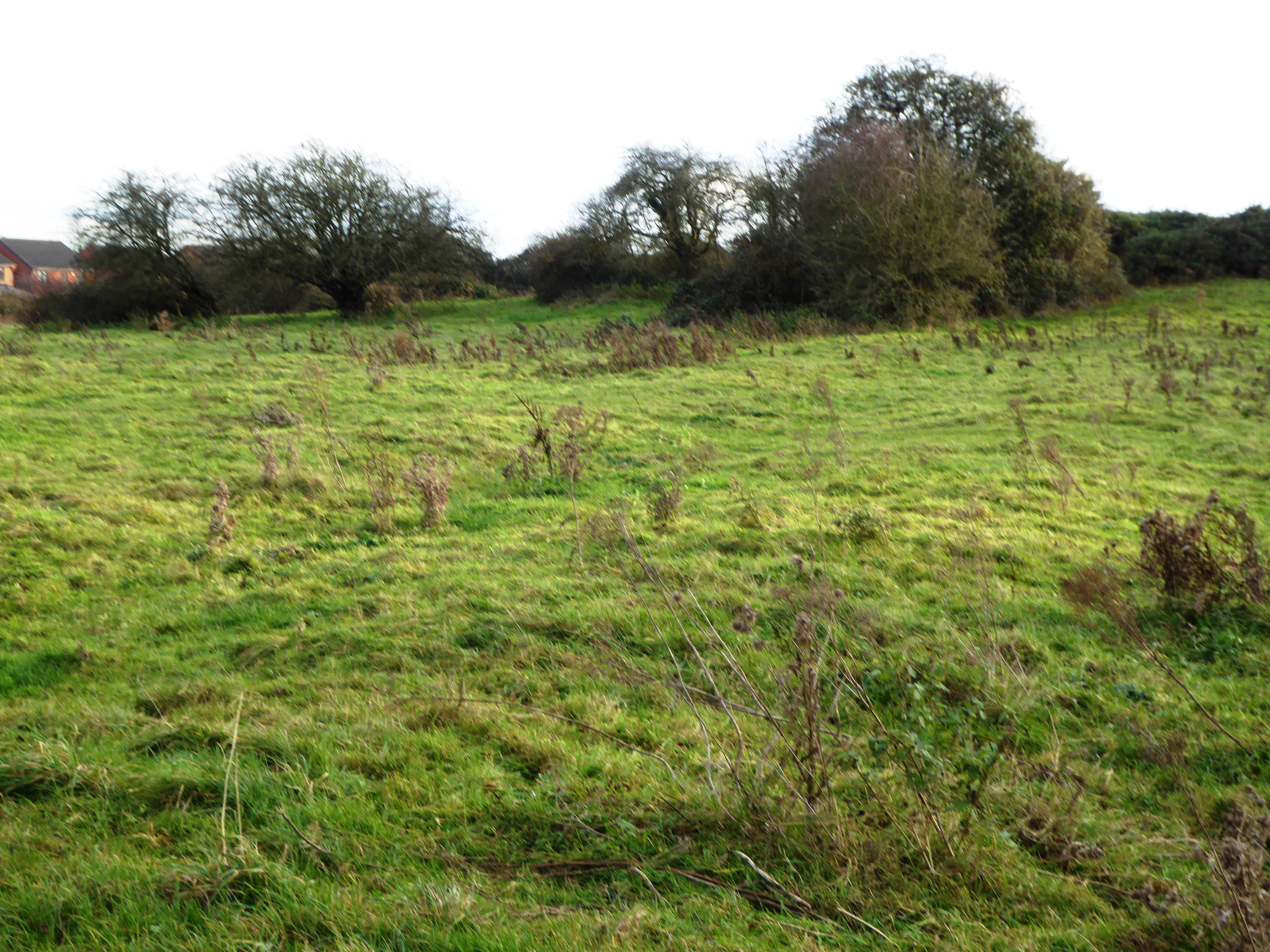
- Interactive map of Halstead Road Centenary Pasture
- Type: Local Nature Reserve
- Location: Mountsorrel, Leicestershire
- OS grid: SK 573 141
- Area: 3.2 hectares (7.9 acres)
- Manager: Charnwood Borough Council

Halstead Road Centenary Pasture is a 3.2-hectare (7.9-acre) local nature reserve in Mountsorrel, Leicestershire. It is owned and managed by Charnwood Borough Council.

This unimproved flower meadow has surviving medieval ridge and furrow. An outcrop of granite is covered with lichens and mosses, and there is a hawthorn and sloe hedge. Birds include yellowhammers and linnets.

There is access from Halstead Road.
