= Glen Parva Nature Reserve =

Nature reserve in Leicestershire, England

Coordinates: 52.588°N 1.173°W

Glen Parva (Glen Hills)
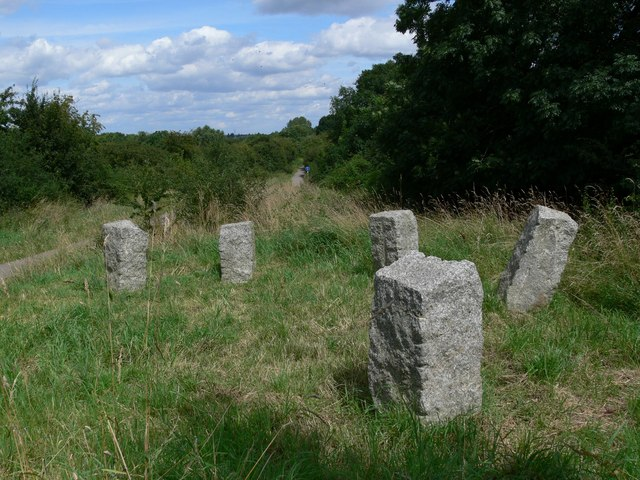
- Interactive map of Glen Parva (Glen Hills)
- Type: Local Nature Reserve
- Location: Glen Parva, Leicestershire
- OS grid: SP 561 992
- Area: 11.9 hectares (29 acres)
- Manager: Blaby District Council, Leicestershire County Council and Glen Parva Parish Council

Glen Parva or Glen Hills is an 11.9 hectares (29 acres) Local Nature Reserve in Glen Parva on the south-western outskirts of Leicester. It is owned and managed by Blaby District Council, Leicestershire County Council and Glen Parva Parish Council.

An arm of the Grand Union Canal runs along the western side of this site, which also has a pond, wet and neutral grassland, woodland, scrub and hedges.

There is access from neighbouring roads including Parsons Drive.
