= Humberstone Park LNR =

Park in United Kingdom

Coordinates: 52.638°N 1.088°W

Humberstone Park
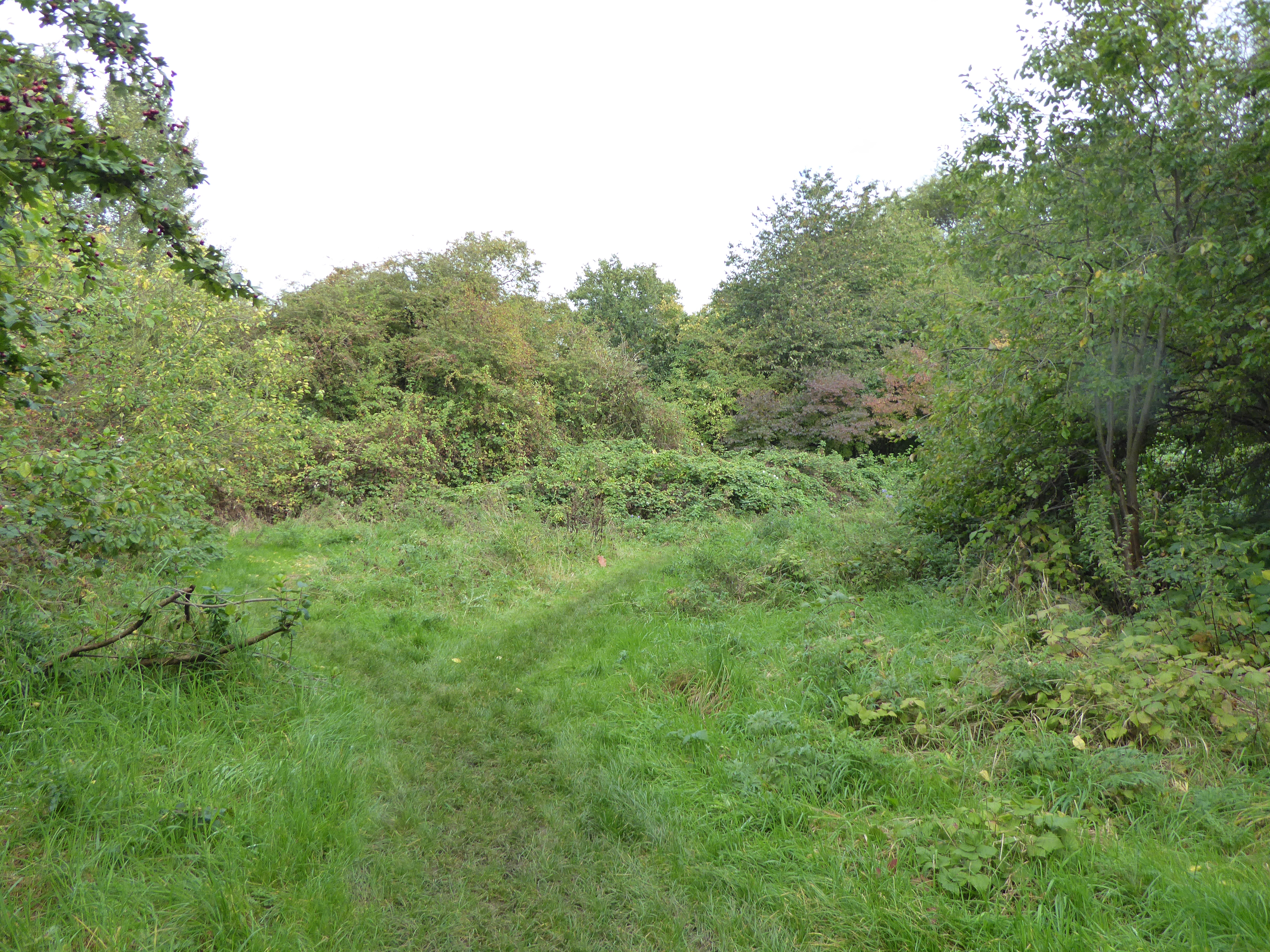
- Interactive map of Humberstone Park
- Type: Local Nature Reserve
- Location: Leicester
- OS grid: SK 618 049
- Area: 2.4 hectares (5.9 acres)

Humberstone Park LNR is a 2.4 hectare Local Nature Reserve in Leicester. It is owned and managed by Leicester City Council.

The nature reserve is part of Humberstone Park. It has diverse fauna and flora, and there is a sunken garden and a former railway embankment called Rally Bank.

There is access from a footpath which starts near the Saltersford Road entrance and crosses Busby Brook.
