= North Kilworth Nature Reserve =

Nature reserve in Leicestershire, England

Coordinates: 52.443°N 1.094°W

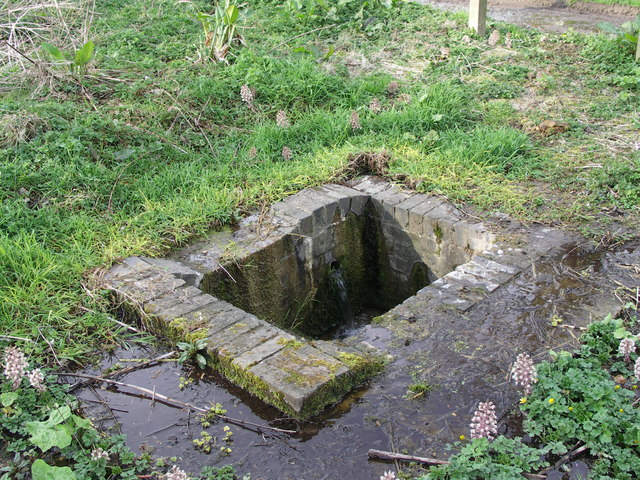
- Interactive map of North Kilworth Nature Reserve
- Type: Local Nature Reserve
- Location: North Kilworth, Leicestershire
- OS grid: SP 617 832
- Area: 2.0 hectares (4.9 acres)
- Manager: Harborough District Council, Millennium Green Trustee Management Group and Leicestershire County Council

North Kilworth Nature Reserve is a 2.0 hectares (4.9 acres) Local Nature Reserve in North Kilworth Leicestershire. It is owned and managed by Harborough District Council, Millennium Green Trustee Management Group and Leicestershire County Council.

This site, which is part of North Kilworth Millennium Green, has a wildflower meadow, a moat with boardwalks and a paddock.

There is access from Cranmore Lane.
