= The Orchards Nature Reserve =

Nature reserve in Leicester, England

Coordinates: 52.651°N 1.165°W

The Orchards
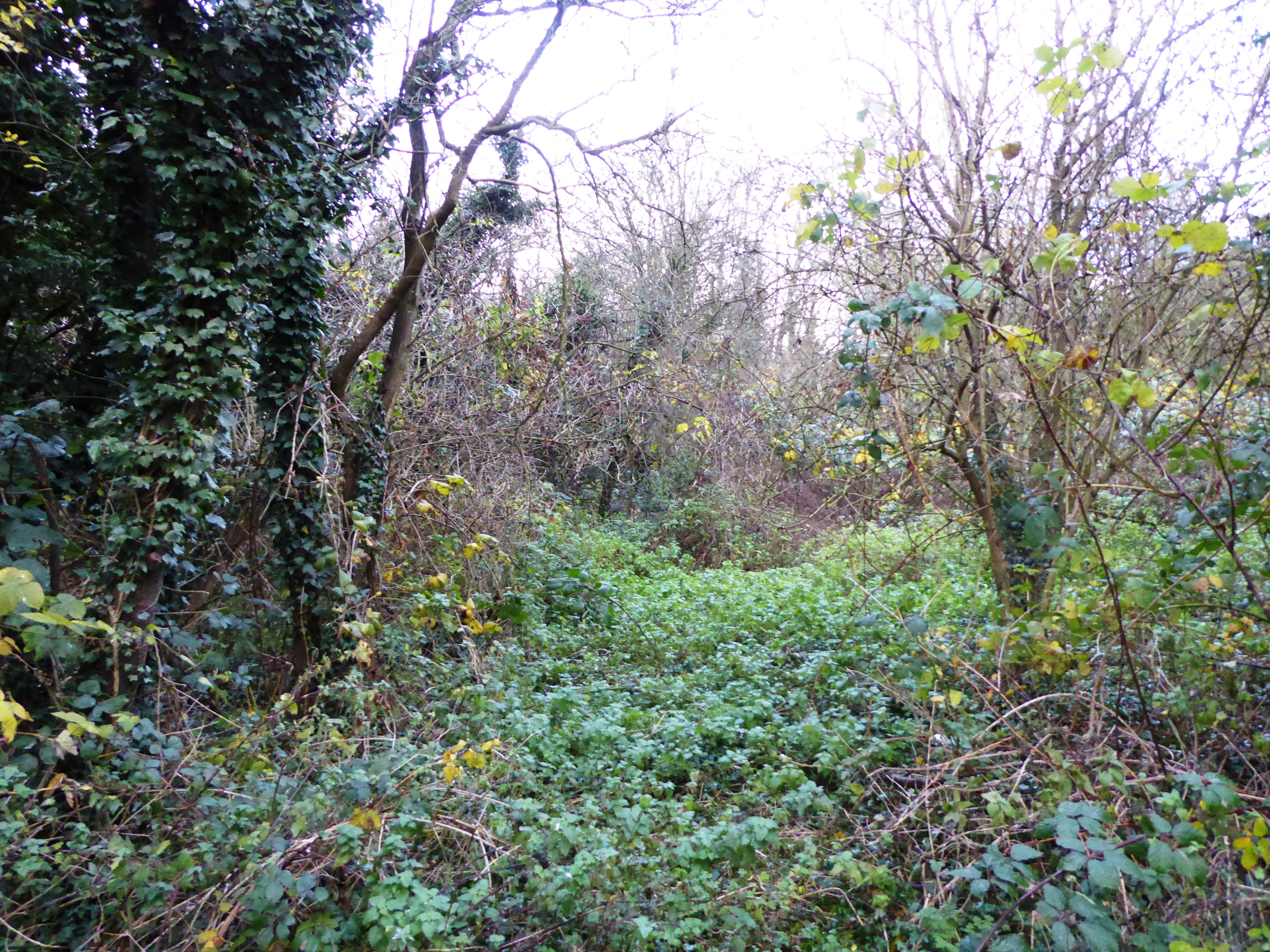
- Interactive map of The Orchards
- Type: Local Nature Reserve
- Location: Leicester
- OS grid: SK 566 063
- Area: 6.6 hectares (16 acres)
- Manager: Groundwork and volunteers

The Orchards is a 6.6 hectares (16 acres) Local Nature Reserve in Leicester. It is owned by Leicester City Council and managed by Groundwork and volunteers.

This site was formerly allotments. It has diverse habitats of damp and dry grassland, mature trees, scrub, and a pond which has many newts, frogs and toads.

There is access from Groby Road.
