= Saltersford Wood =

Nature reserve in Leicestershire, England

Coordinates: 52.718°N 1.525°W

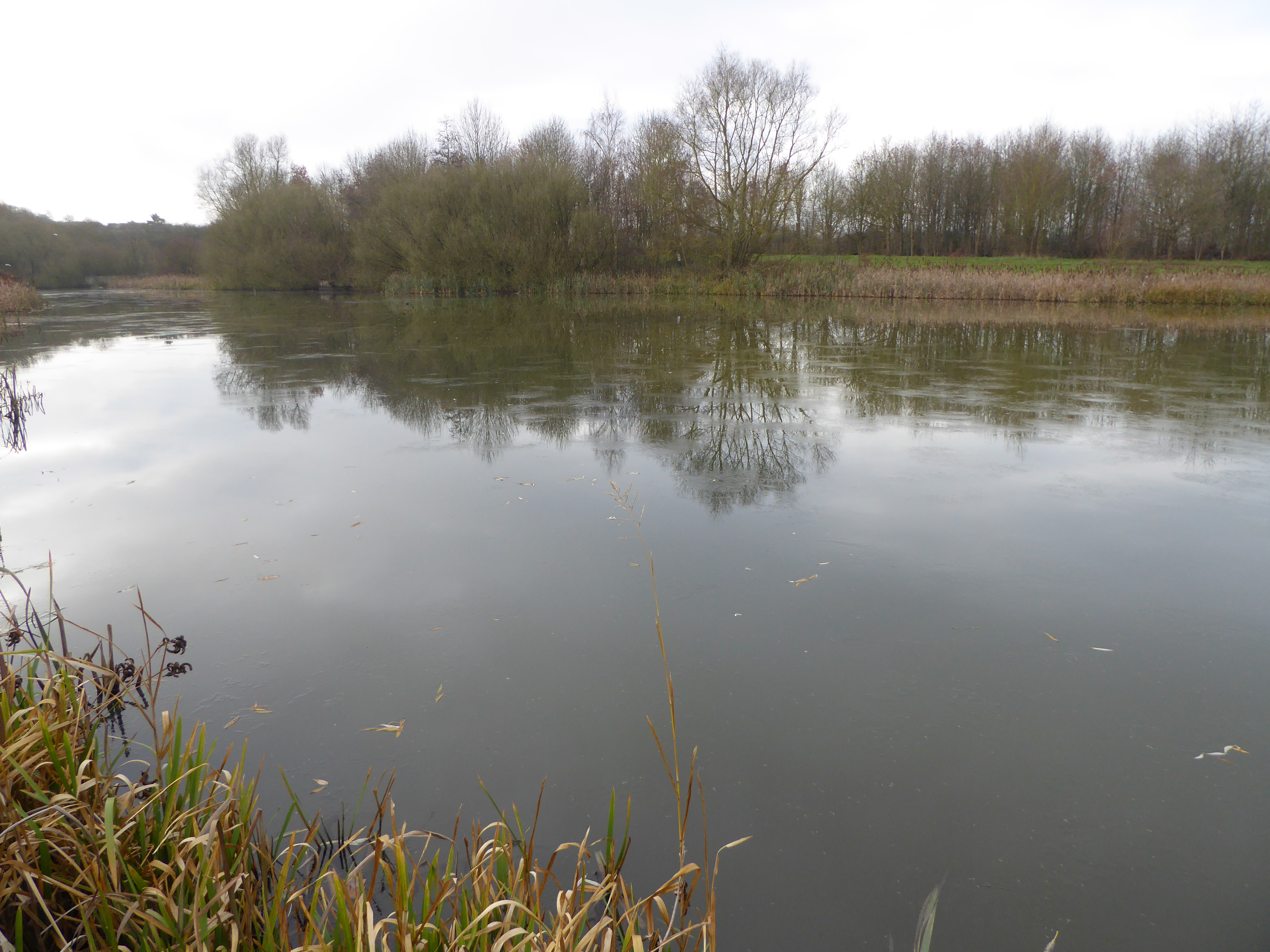
- Interactive map of Saltersford Wood
- Type: Local Nature Reserve
- Location: Measham, Leicestershire
- OS grid: SK 322 135
- Area: 5.7 hectares (14 acres)
- Manager: Leicestershire County Council

Saltersford Wood or Saltersford Valley is a 5.7-hectare (14-acre) Local Nature Reserve north-west of Measham in Leicestershire. It is owned and managed by Leicestershire County Council, and it part of The National Forest. The wood is situated 1 km (0.62 mi) South East of the Saltersford Valley Picnic Area, a twinned Local Nature Reserve also administered by Leicestershire County Council. The two are now separated by Ashby Road and the Donisthorpe Cemetery.

This site has native woodland, hay meadows and areas of open water known as "flashes" with fishing platforms for disabled people. The "flashes" are the result of the flooding of Saltersford Brook caused by mining subsidence causing the nearby Saltersford Brook to flood. There are picnic benches and a car park.

There is access from Measham Road.
