= Watermead Country Park =

Artificial lakes in Leicestershire, England

Coordinates: 52°41′46.76″N 1°6′4.81″W

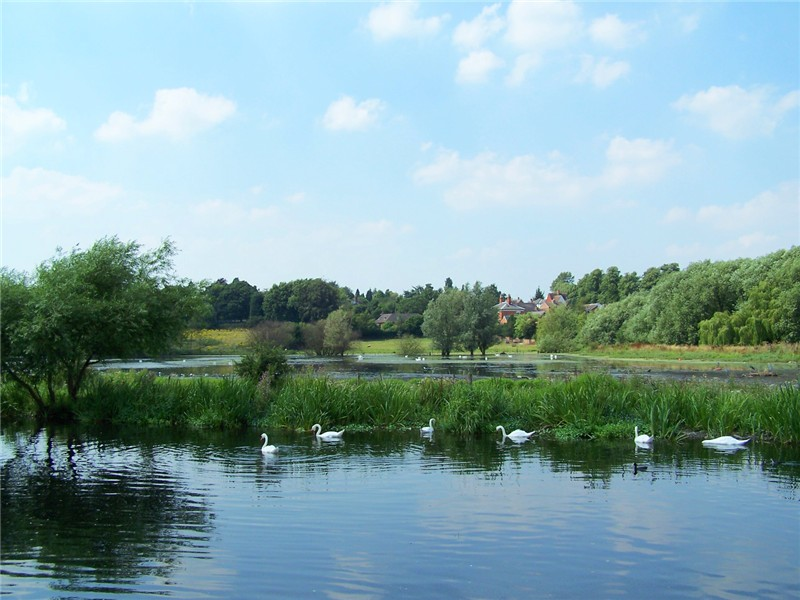
Watermead country park

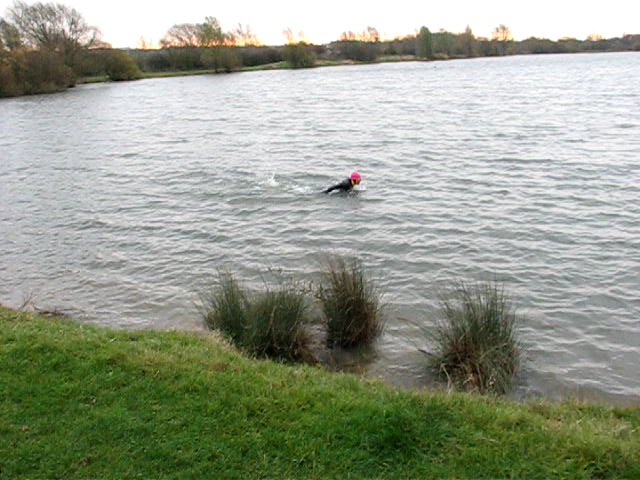
Swim training in King Lear's Lake

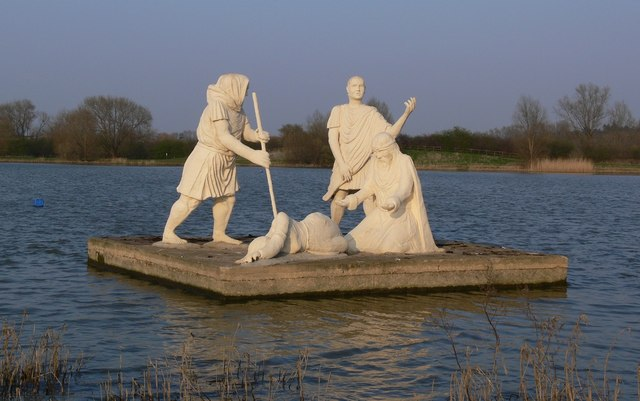
Statue depicting a scene from King Lear on King Lear's Lake

The Watermead Country Park is a network of artificial lakes in the valley of the River Soar and the old Grand Union Canal, in and to the north of Leicester and in and to the south of the Borough of Charnwood in Leicestershire. The southern part of the park, which includes the Hill and the Mammoth is located in Rushey Mead. It runs north to south along the path of the watercourses, with Birstall to the west and Thurmaston to the east. The parks provide bird watching, fishing and watersports facilities, and are managed by a partnership of Leicestershire County Council, Leicester City Council and Charnwood Borough Council.

The park includes three Local Nature Reserves, Reedbed – Watermead Country Park (North), Watermead Country Park – South and Birstall Meadows.

The northernmost lake is named John Merricks Lake, after the late John Merricks, a silver Olympic medallist who competed in sailing events on a nearby lake as a schoolboy. He died in a car accident in 1997.

Further south is King Lear's Lake, a popular fishing lake which can be circumnavigated and is popular with people walking dogs and cyclists. A statue on the western side of the lake depicts the final scene of Shakespeare's play King Lear. The lake is also used for open water swim training by Leicester Triathlon Club, and for water training of Newfoundland Dogs.

A 5km parkrun takes place at the Country Park each Saturday morning.

There are several further artificial lakes continuing south following the course of the canal ending with the southernmost lake, often referred to as the Mammoth lake due to the presence of a large statue of a Mammoth atop a small hill aside the lake, from where one can see Leicester and the surrounding area for some distance in either direction. There was a previous woolly mammoth where the current one stands, although it was burned down in an arson attack several years ago. The Millennium Mammoth was built to commemorate the discovery of ice age mammoth remains found when Watermead was a quarry.

In January 2010, two brothers died after falling into one of the frozen lakes. They had been plucked from the lake by a police officer, who was leaning out of a helicopter hovering above the frozen surface.
