= Goss Meadows =

Nature reserve in Leicester, England

Coordinates: 52.655°N 1.165°W

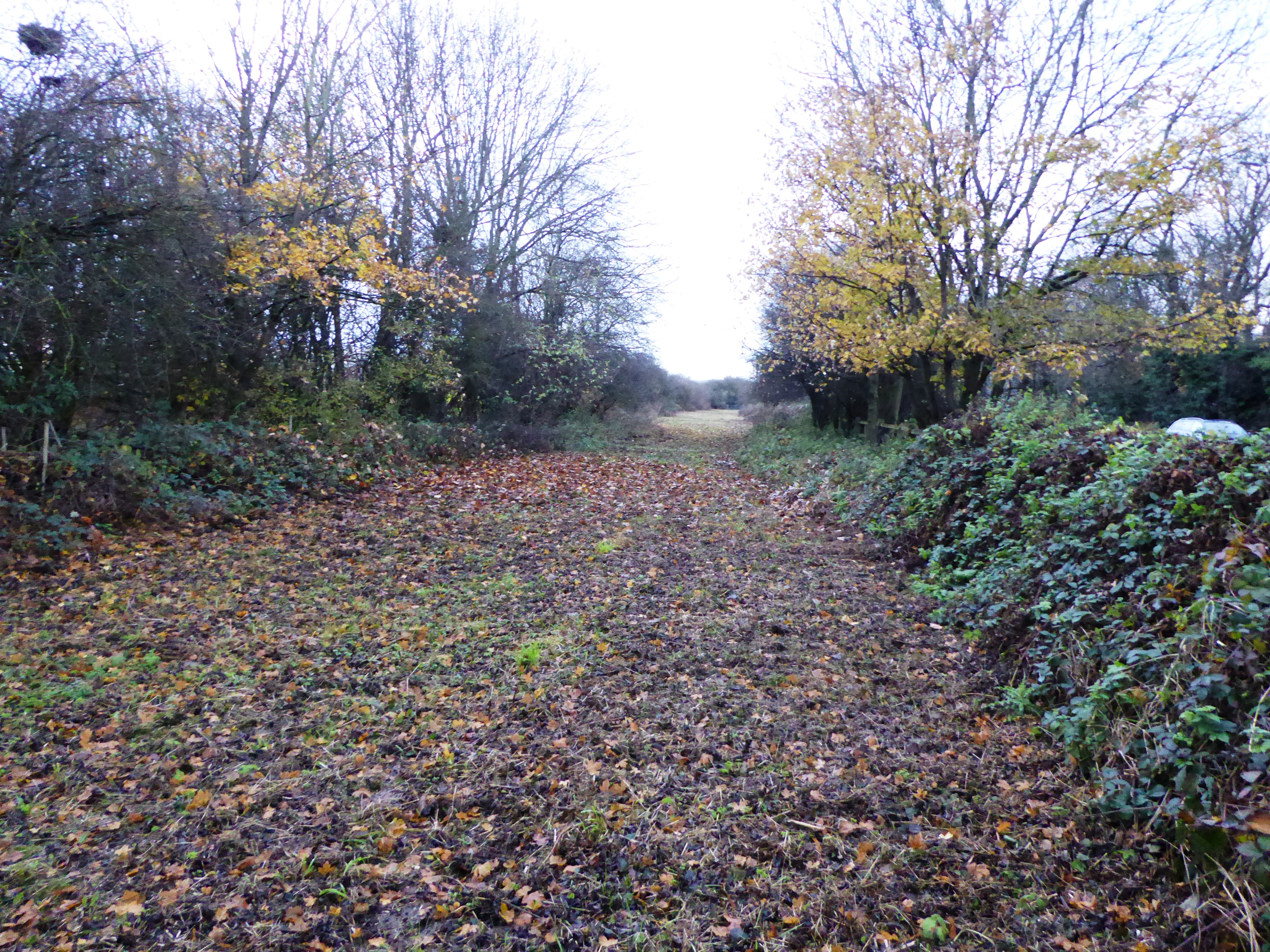
- Interactive map of Goss Meadows
- Type: Local Nature Reserve
- Location: Leicester
- OS grid: SK 566 067
- Area: 2.8 hectares (6.9 acres)
- Manager: Leicester City Council

Goss Meadows is a 2.8 hectares (6.9 acres) Local Nature Reserve on the north-western outskirts of Leicester. It is owned and managed by Leicester City Council.

This is a long narrow strip along the western side of Anstey Lane. It is woodland and grassland, which has some uncommon wild flowers, such as spiny restharrow.

There is access from Anstey Lane.
