= Burbage Wood and Aston Firs =

UK Site of Special Scientific Interest

Coordinates: 52.541°N 1.334°W

- Site of Special Scientific Interest
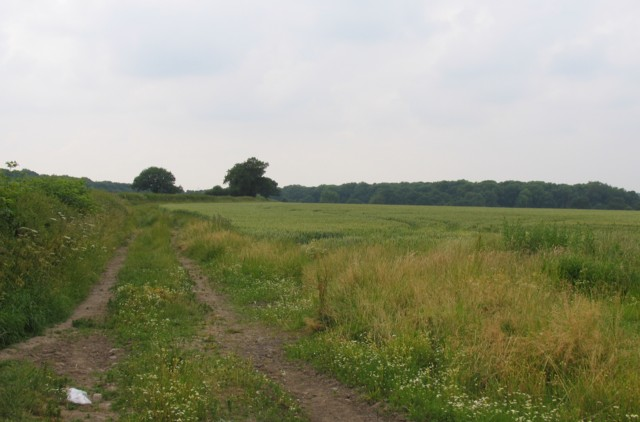
- Location of Burbage Wood and Aston Firs.
- Area of search: Leicestershire
- Grid reference: SP 452 940
- Interest: Biological
- Area: 51.1 hectares
- Notification date: 1983
- Location map: Magic Map

Burbage Wood and Aston Firs is a 51.1-hectare (126-acre) biological Site of Special Scientific Interest in Leicestershire.

== Overview ==
These semi-natural woods on poorly drained soils are dominated by ash and oak. Hazel and hawthorn are common in the shrub layer, and there are flowers such as sweet woodruff and water avens.

There is public access to Burbage Wood, but Aston Firs is private.

Burbage Wood is part of Burbage Common and Woods, an 85 hectare Local Nature Reserve. The nature reserve is owned by Hinckley and Bosworth Borough Council who manage it as a nature reserve and a public park. The Common is unimproved heath-grassland and is historically common land. Such heathland was common in this area until land use changes in the 19th century.
