= Nature Alive =

Nature reserve in Leicestershire, England

Coordinates: 52.732°N 1.375°W

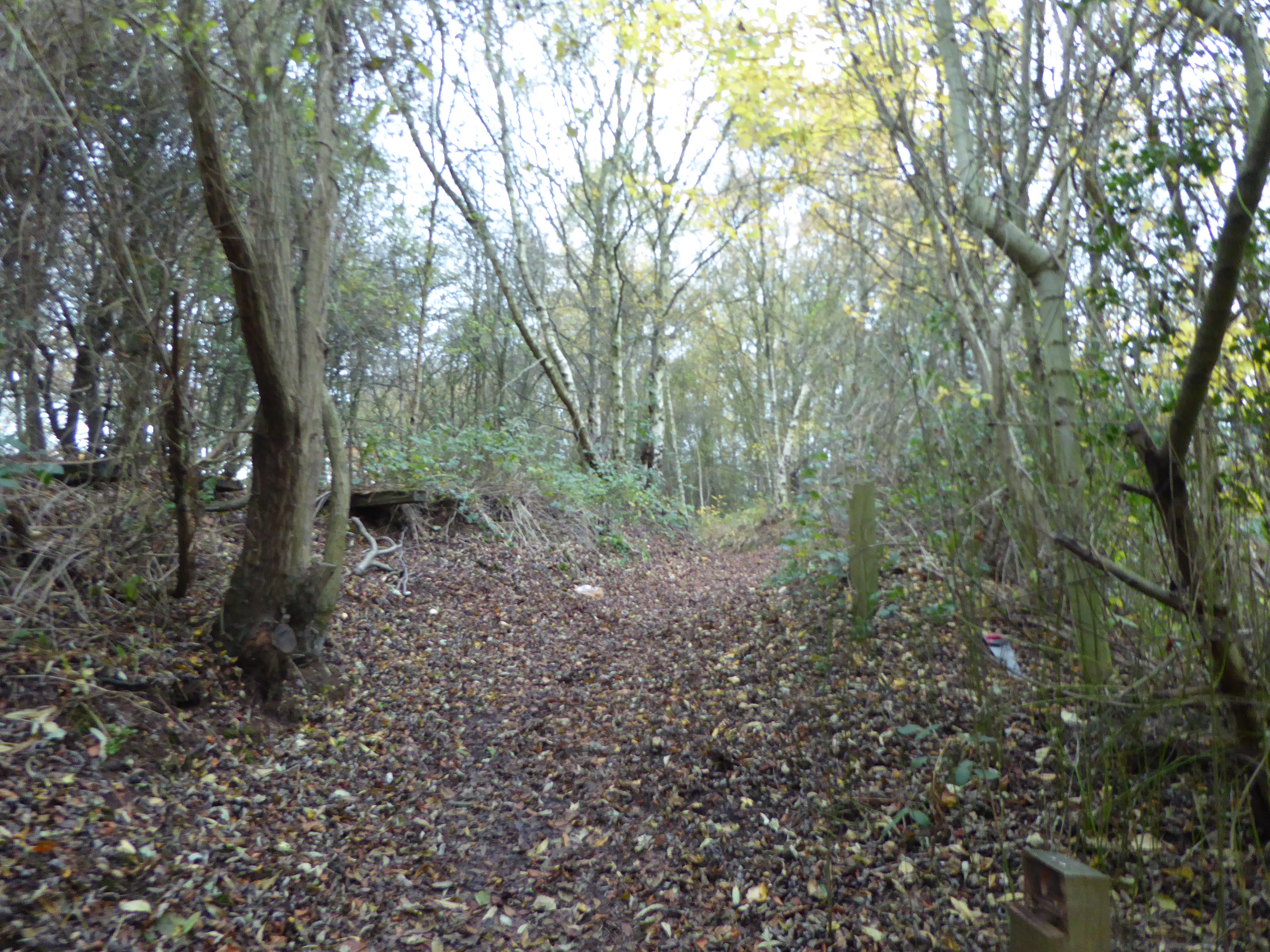
- Interactive map of Nature Alive
- Type: Local Nature Reserve
- Location: Coalville, Leicestershire
- OS grid: SK 423 151
- Area: 5.7 hectares (14 acres)
- Manager: North West Leicestershire District Council

Nature Alive is a 5.7 hectares (14 acres) Local Nature Reserve in northern outskirts of Coalville in Leicestershire. It is owned and managed by North West Leicestershire District Council.

This site was formerly a coal stocking yard for Snibston Colliery, and it now has diverse habitats such as woodland, ponds, a wildflower meadow, rough pasture and hedges. The fauna existing there include water voles and great crested newts.

The reserve can be accessed from Stephenson Way and Brunel Way.
