= Moira Junction =

Nature reserve in Leicestershire, England

Coordinates: 52.739°N 1.15°W

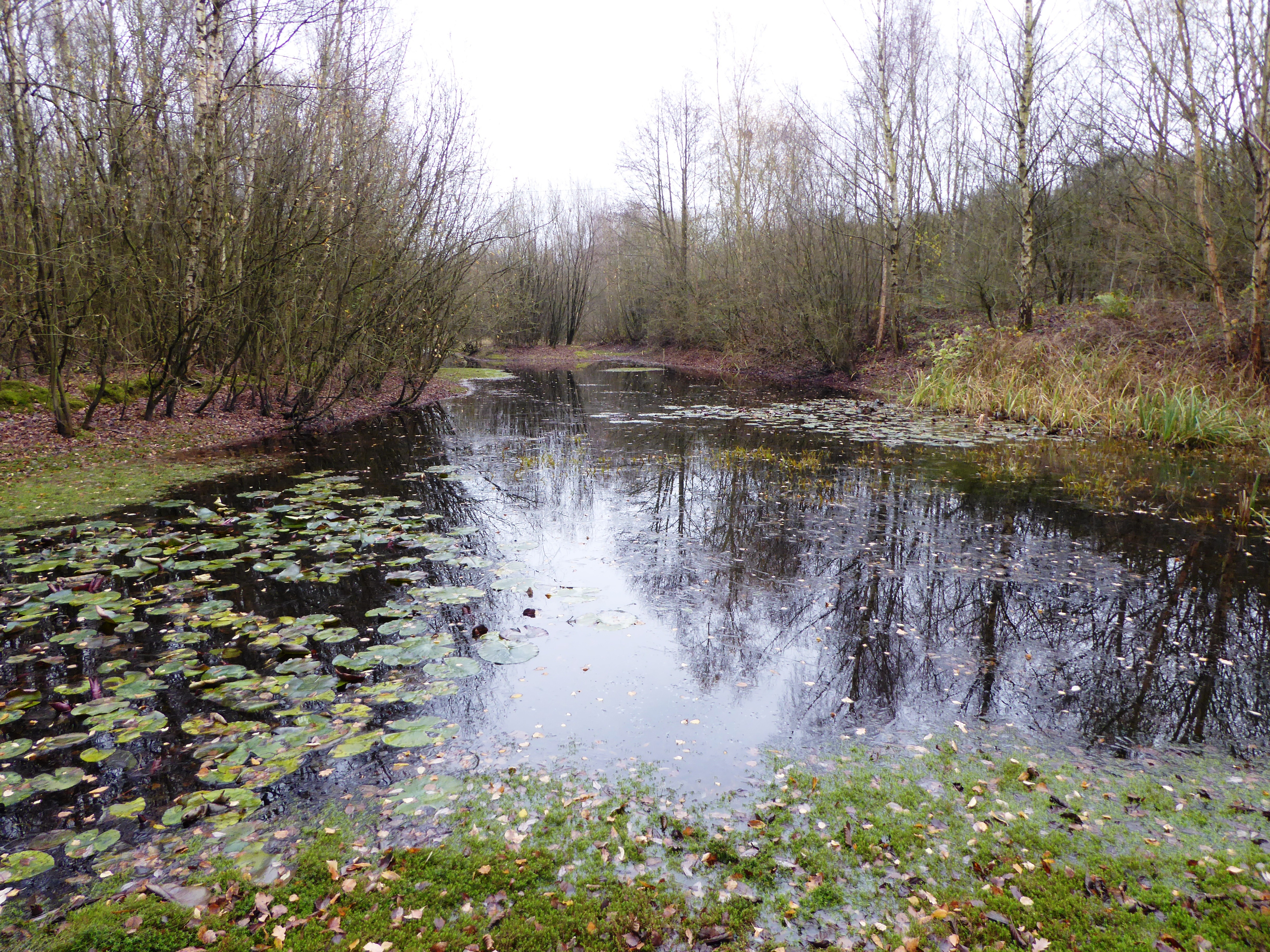
- Interactive map of Moira Junction
- Type: Local Nature Reserve
- Location: Moira, Leicestershire
- OS grid: SK 305 158
- Area: 3.5 hectares (8.6 acres)
- Manager: Leicestershire County Council

Moira Junction is a 3.5-hectare (8.6-acre) Local Nature Reserve north of Moira in Leicestershire. It is owned and managed by Leicestershire County Council.

This is part of the former Overseal railway sidings, which closed in 1966 and was developed as a nature area in 1991. It has two lakes, birch woodland and heath grassland.

There is access by a footpath from Bath Lane.
