= Church of St James the Great, Birstall =

Church in Birstall, Leicestershire, England

Coordinates: 52°40′27″N 1°07′10″W

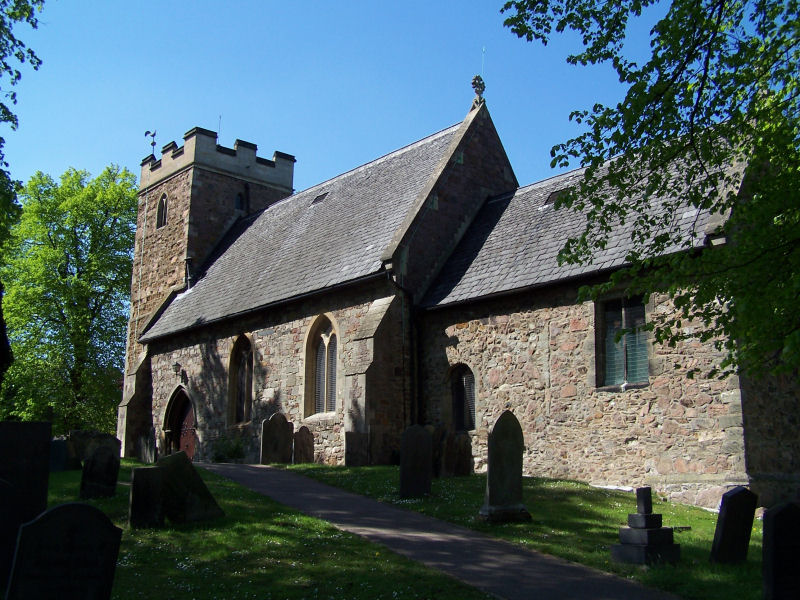
- Denomination: Church of England

History
- Dedication: St James the Great

Administration
- Diocese: Leicester
- Archdeaconry: Leicester
- Parish: Birstall, Leicestershire

Clergy
- Rector: Amanda Digman

The Church of St James the Great is a church in Birstall, Leicestershire. It is a Grade II listed building.

== History ==
The church dates from the Early English period, though an earlier church was thought to stand on the site after remnants of a Saxon window were found during the restoration of 1869. These are preserved in the chancel.

The modern church consists of a nave, chancel, tower and north aisle.

The tower has 3 bells and was added in the 13th century and is built of ironstone. The tower once had a steeple but this was removed in 1823 after it was struck by lightning.

The chancel was also built in the 13th century but has been restored many times since. The chancel windows are thought to date from at least the 13th century. Sir George Gilbert Scott and his son, George Gilbert Scott Jr., restored the church in 1869, which involved the nave being extended and the chancel and sanctuary being remodelled. The sanctuary has an aumbry cupboard and a piscina. The font is at the west side of the nave.
