= Kirby Frith Nature Reserve =

Local Nature Reserve in Leicester, United Kingdom

Coordinates: 52.636°N 1.204°W

Kirby Frith
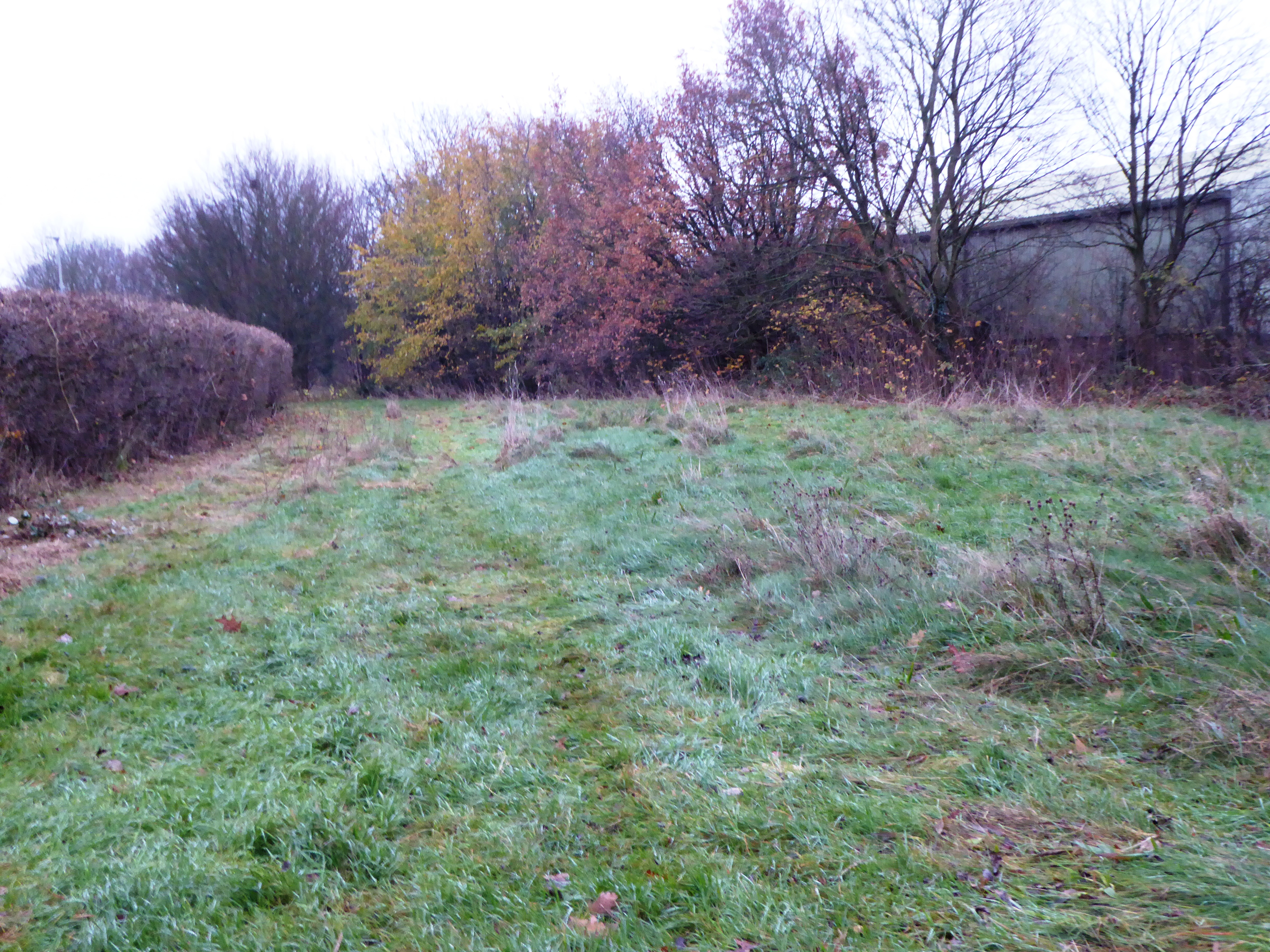
- Interactive map of Kirby Frith
- Type: Local Nature Reserve
- Location: Leicester
- Area: 2.1 hectares (5.2 acres)
- Manager: Leicester City Council

Kirby Frith is a 2.1-hectare (5.2-acre) Local Nature Reserve on the western outskirts of Leicester. It is owned and managed by Leicester City Council.

This site is described by Natural England as the richest wildflower grassland in the county, with species such as devil's-bit scabious, betony and yellow rattle. Butterflies include speckled woods and meadow browns.

There is access from Cherry Hills Road.
