= Knighton Spinney =

Nature reserve in Leicester, England

Coordinates: 52.602°N 1.108°W

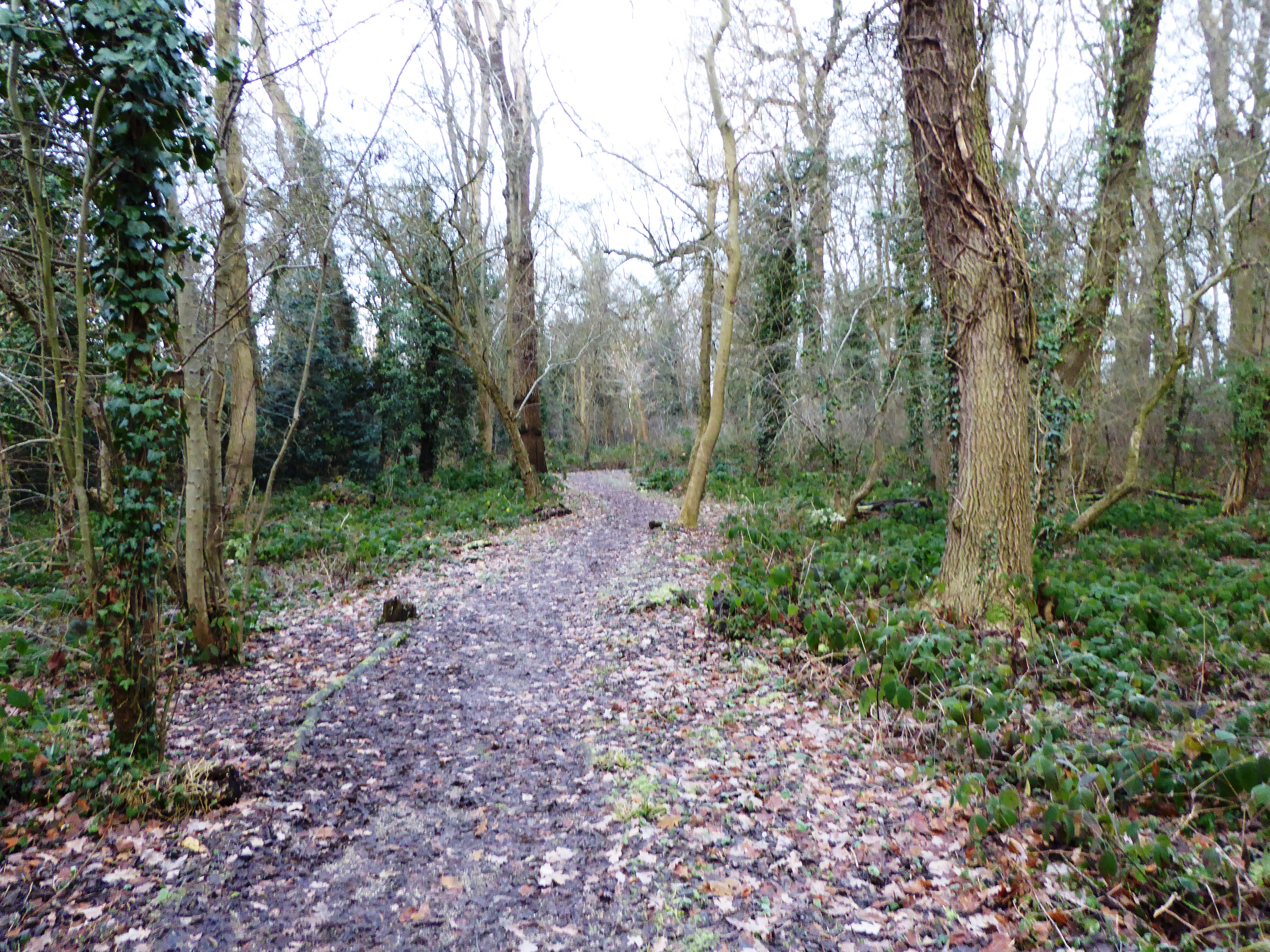
- Interactive map of Knighton Spinney
- Type: Local Nature Reserve
- Location: Leicester
- OS grid: SK 605 008
- Area: 2.9 hectares (7.2 acres)
- Manager: Environ for Leicester City Council

Knighton Spinney is a 2.9-hectare (7.2-acre) Local Nature Reserve in Leicester. It is owned by Leicester City Council and managed by Environ for the council.

This oak and ash plantation is part of Knighton Park. Flora include wood anemones, and there are birds such as nuthatches, treecreepers and great spotted woodpeckers.

The site is closed to the public apart from on occasional open days.
