= Lucas Marsh =

Nature reserve in Leicestershire, England

Coordinates: 52.592°N 1.085°W

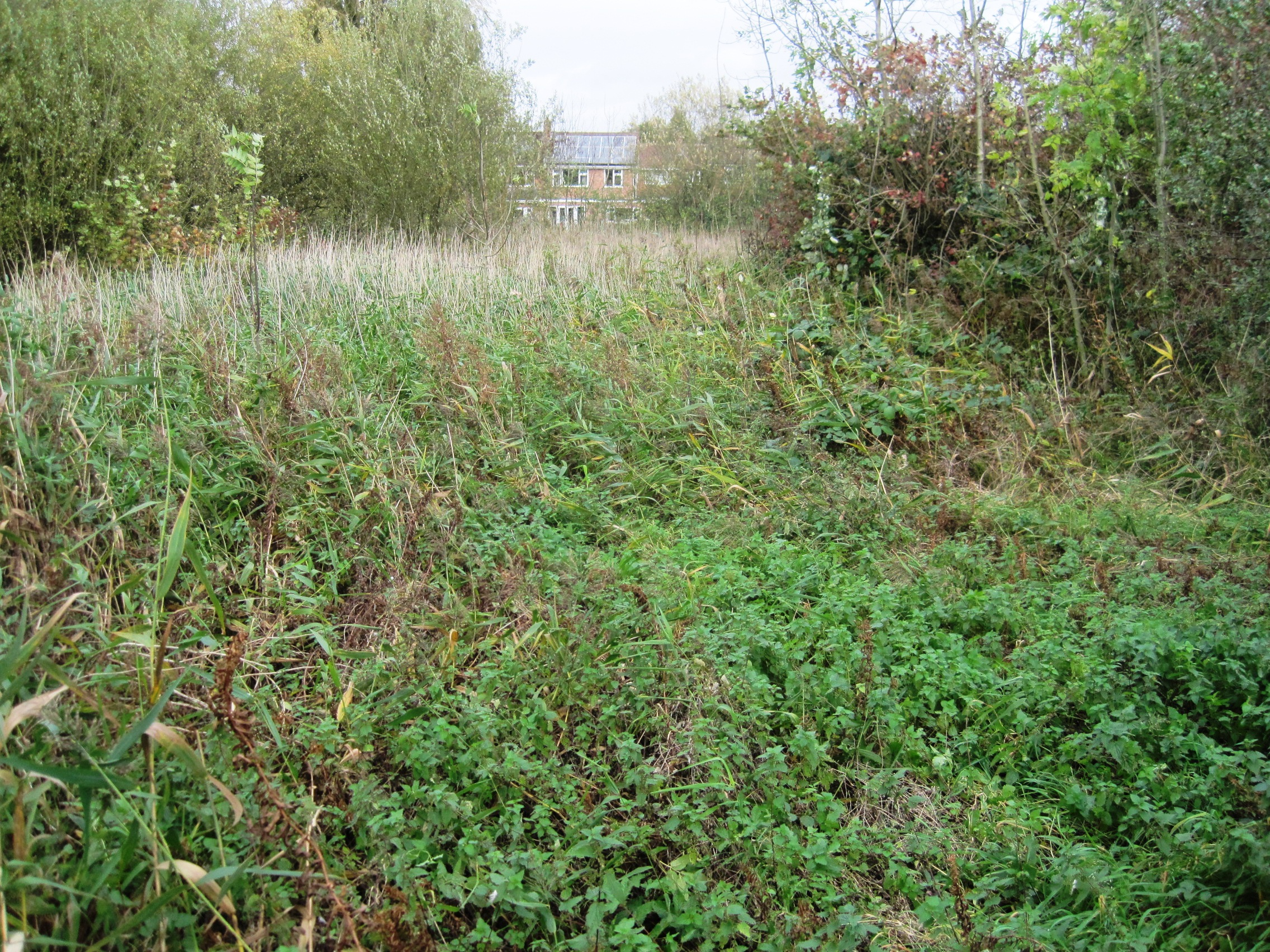
- Interactive map of Lucas Marsh
- Type: Local Nature Reserve
- Location: Oadby, Leicestershire
- OS grid: SP 621 997
- Area: 1.5 hectares (3.7 acres)
- Manager: Leicestershire and Rutland Wildlife Trust

Lucas Marsh is a 1.5 hectare Local Nature Reserve in Oadby in Leicestershire. It is part of Brock's Hill Country Park, and is owned by Oadby and Wigston Borough Council and managed by the Leicestershire and Rutland Wildlife Trust.

The marsh is dominated by greater willowherb and common reed, while there are also areas of rough grassland, a hedge, trees and scrub. Butterflies include small tortoiseshell, speckled wood, peacock and orange tip.

There is access by a footpath from Washbrook Lane.
