= Birstall, Leicestershire =

Village in Leicestershire, England

Coordinates: 52.67364°N 1.12000°W

Birstall
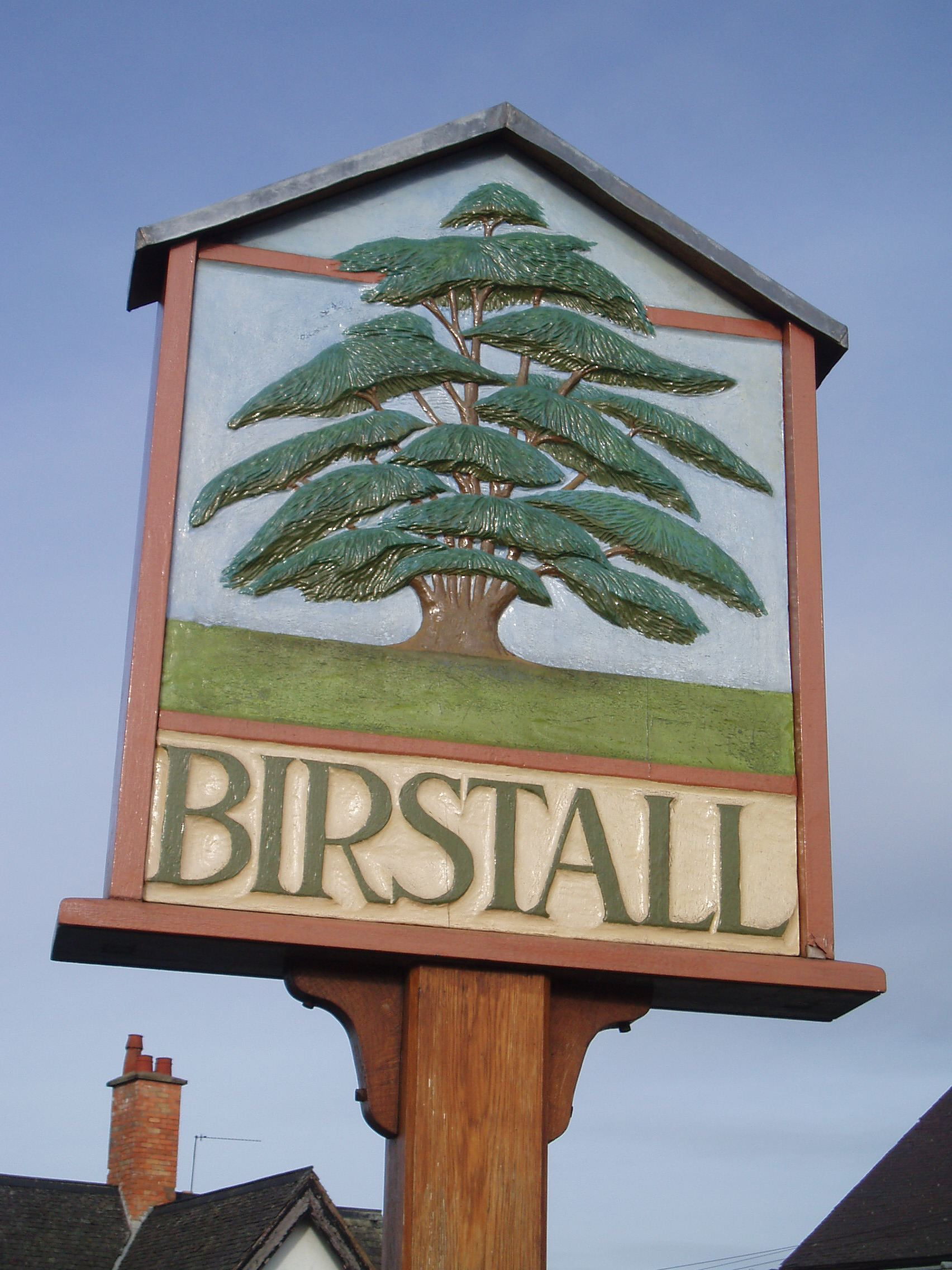
- Village sign depicting a cedar tree

- Location within Leicestershire
- Population: 14,313 (2021)
- OS grid reference: SK596088
- Civil parish: Birstall
- District: Charnwood
- Shire county: Leicestershire
- Region: East Midlands
- Country: England
- Sovereign state: United Kingdom
- Post town: LEICESTER
- Postcode district: LE4
- Dialling code: 0116
- Police: Leicestershire
- Fire: Leicestershire
- Ambulance: East Midlands
- UK Parliament: Mid Leicestershire

Birstall is a large village and civil parish within the Charnwood borough of Leicestershire, England. It is three miles north of Leicester city centre and is part of the wider Leicester Urban Area.

It is the largest village in Charnwood, with a population only marginally lower than the neighbouring town of Syston at the 2001 census.

== Village ==
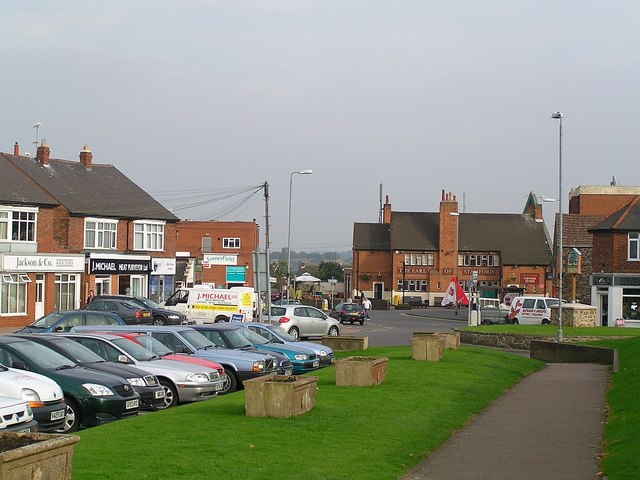
Birstall village centre

Birstall lies on the A6 and is the last major settlement before Leicester when arriving from the north. Birstall thus forms part of the Leicester Urban Area. The village centre lies just off the A6, along Sibson Road. The village contains two supermarkets, a garden centre and a variety of other shops. There are a number of schools, including Highcliffe Primary School, Riverside Primary School, Hallam Fields Primary School and The Cedars Academy. The village contains the Church of St James the Great, Birstall, the St Teresa Roman Catholic church and Birstall Methodist Church.

There is a large housing estate in the north-west of the village, leading off Greengate Lane. The Grand Union Canal runs along the eastern side of the village, which is adjacent to Watermead Country Park, a series of lakes in the bottom of the Soar Valley, which have been set aside as a recreational area and country park.

To the north of the village, the A6 meets the A46 Leicester Western Bypass and then continues on towards Loughborough along the Soar Valley.

The closest village to Birstall is Wanlip, a smaller village, with the village of Rothley being the next closest. The villages of Thurmaston and Syston are also nearby. Birstall shares its southern border with the City of Leicester.

The symbol of Birstall is a cedar tree. The original tree stands in Roman Road. It was once in the grounds of the now demolished Birstall Hall. The area of the parish is 791 acres (3.20 km^{2}).

== History ==
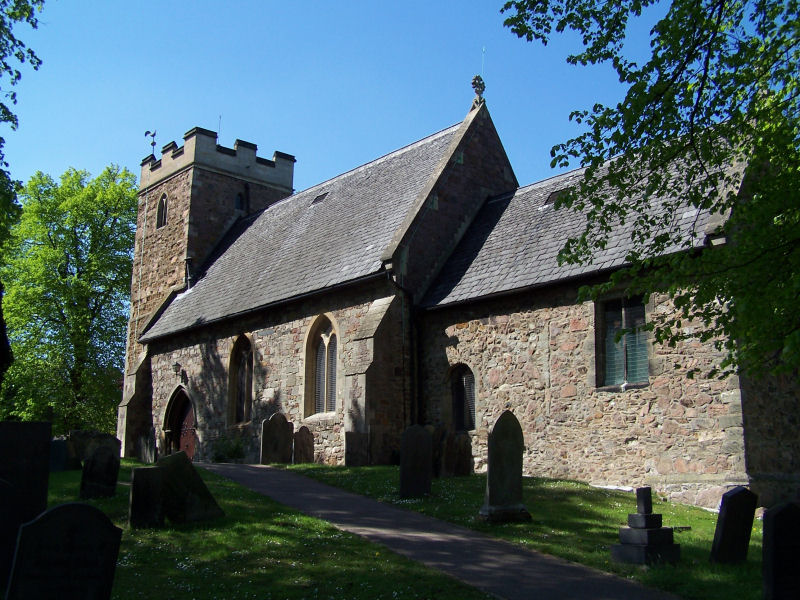
Church of St James the Great, Birstall on Church Hill. Here lies the grave of John Hannah (VC).

The village's name means lit. 'settlement built on the site of a fortification'.

Saxon remnants have been found in the village and surrounding area. The village was called Burstalle in the Domesday Book when it belonged to Hugh de Grandmesnil. Willard held these lands for Hugh and the 16 acres (65,000 m^{2}) of meadow and a mill were said to be worth three ounces of gold. The village began its growth with the arrival of the Great Central Railway in 1899. From then onwards development has continued and still continues to-day. Between 1901 and the 2001 the population grew from 611 to over 11,000.

=== Hallam Fields ===
A new housing development called 'Hallam Fields' commenced construction in 2006. It occupies land to the west of the A6, between the 'Gates' estate and the A46. The development will take ten years to complete, consisting of up to 900 properties including schools, shops, offices, industrial units and a fire station. It has been described as a mini Poundbury. By April 2010 it had 11 streets.

== Places and buildings ==
=== Schools ===
- Highcliffe primary school
- Riverside primary school
- Hallam fields primary school
- The Cedars Academy

Note: Longslade Community College and Stonehill high school merged to become The Cedars Academy

=== Parks ===
- Watermead Country Park
- School Lane recreational park
- Harrowgate park

=== Golf club ===
- Birstall Golf Club—founded in 1901—one of the first golf clubs in Leicestershire.

=== Local organisations ===
- 1947 (Birstall) Squadron—RAFAC squadron located within the grounds of Riverside primary school.

=== Transport ===
The main village areas of Wanlip Lane and Harrowgate Drive are served by Centrebus service 22A and First Leicester 22B while the A6 corridor is served by buses between Leicester and Loughborough operated by Kincbbus Skylink and Arriva Midlands service 127.

The Birstall Park and Ride service is at the northern end of the village and is operated by Roberts Travel Group with buses into Leicester City Centre during the daytime.

The Great Central Railway steam railway has its southern terminus near the village, where the A6 meets the Leicester outer ringroad at Red Hill Circle. Just north of Red Hill Circle, and west of the A6, is Red Hill filling station. The railway forms the boundary of the southern end of Birstall Golf Club.

== Twin towns ==
- Rixensart, Walloon Brabant, Belgium
