= Stanton under Bardon =

Village in Leicestershire, England

Coordinates: 52.6875°N 1.3136°W

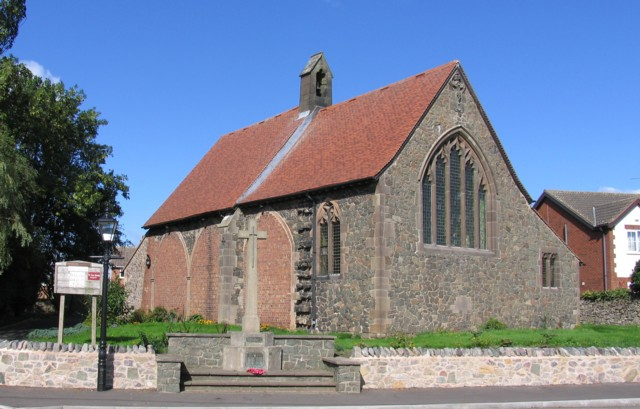
- St Mary and All Saints' parish church

- Location within Leicestershire
- Population: 634 (2011 Census)
- OS grid reference: SK4610
- Civil parish: Stanton-under-Bardon
- District: Hinckley and Bosworth
- Shire county: Leicestershire
- Region: East Midlands
- Country: England
- Sovereign state: United Kingdom
- Post town: Markfield
- Postcode district: LE67
- Police: Leicestershire
- Fire: Leicestershire
- Ambulance: East Midlands
- UK Parliament: Mid Leicestershire
- Website: Stanton Under Bardon Parish Council

Stanton-under-Bardon is a village and civil parish about 4 miles (6.4 km) southeast of Coalville, in the Hinckley and Bosworth district, in Leicestershire, England. The 2011 Census recorded the parish's population as 634.

Most of the houses are red brick, and many on Main Street are terraced and have long, thin gardens. The village is set in farmland and open fields and is near Junction 22 of the M1 motorway. The village is near Markfield, with which it shares a local newspaper, the Markfield and Stanton Under Bardon Herald. The village has a thatched pub, two churches and a primary school. Bardon Quarry is nearby.

== History ==
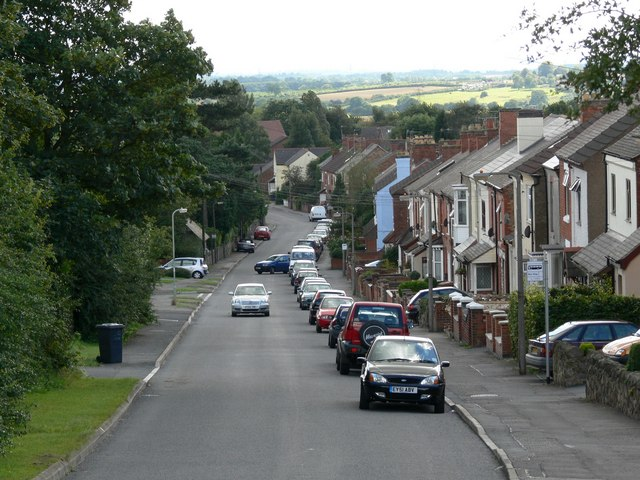
Main Street, Stanton under Bardon in July 2007

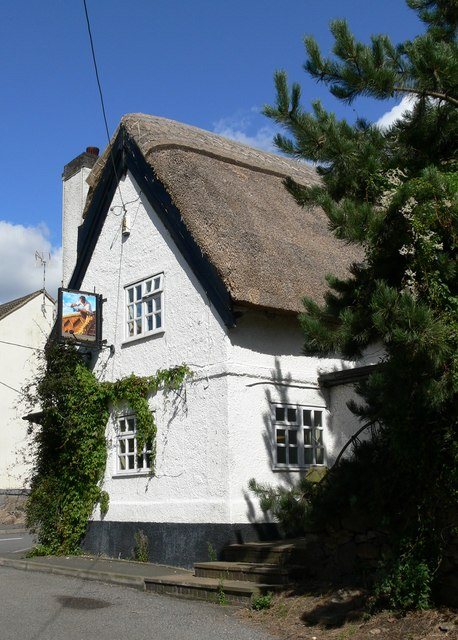
The Old Thatched Inn

Stanton under Bardon derives from the Old English words stᾱn for "stone" and tῡn for a village or estate.

The Domesday Book of 1086 records Stanton under Bardon under the Guthlaxon hundred of Leicestershire. It records the village as having had 18 households and three geld units. These were average statistics for the time in comparison to surrounding villages such as Barlestone and Osbaston. Geld units refer to the total tax assessed on each property. It is also noted that there were 13 villagers and five smallholders, which were required to pay £1 to the Lord as rent in 1086 to Lord Geoffrey of la Guerche.

In the early 1870s the Imperial Gazetteer of England and Wales described Stanton under Bardon as

a township-chapelry in Thornton parish, Leicester; near Bardon Hill r. station, 1½ mile NW of Thornton village. Post town, Thornton, under Leicester. Acres, 1,400. Real property, £1, 952. Pop., 312. Houses, 64. The manor belongs to Earl Grey. The living is annexed to Thornton. There is a Wesleyan chapel.

In 1881 a high proportion of the local population worked with various minerals, suggesting that stone was key to the areas foundations and the possible cause for the naming of the village.

== Parish church ==
Anglicans from Stanton under Bardon worshipped at Thornton, 2 miles (3 km) away, until Stanton's own Church of England parish church of St Mary and All Saints church was completed and consecrated in 1909. It was planned to have a south aisle and a west end, but has never been completed, and the three-bay arcade intended for the south aisle is blocked with red brick. The church seats 120 people.

== Demography ==
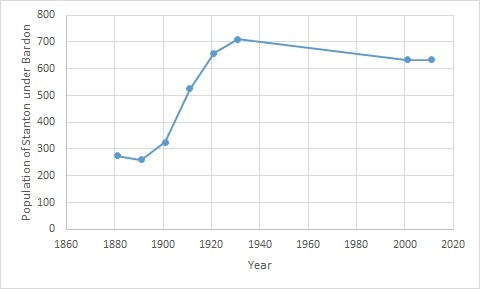
Population of Stanton under Bardon Civil Parish, Leicestershire, as reported by the Census of Population from 1881 to 2011

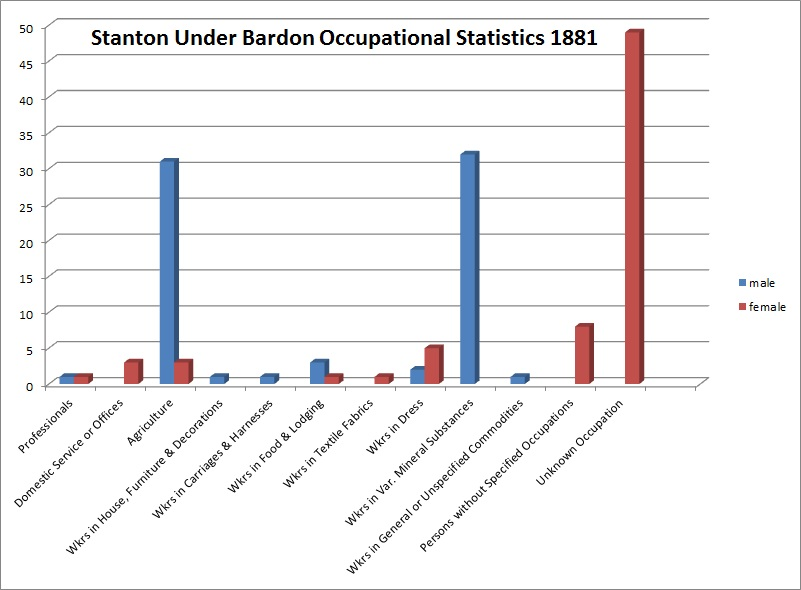
Occupation data classified into the 24 1881 plus sex, A Vision of Britain through Time

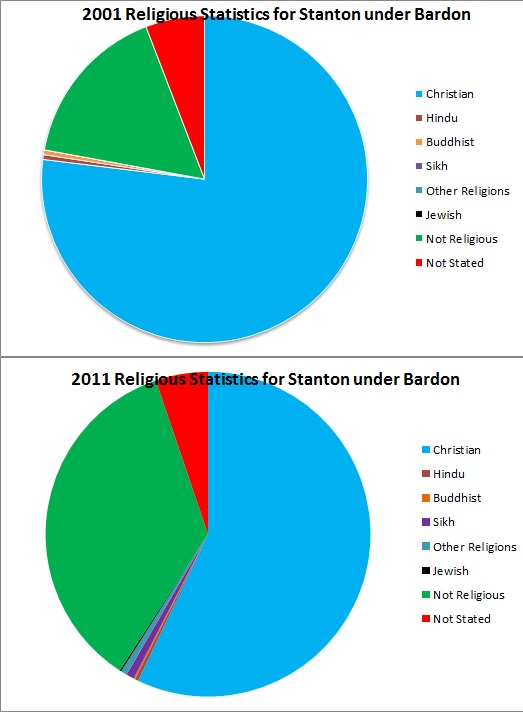
Taken from Office for National Statistics

The 2011 Census recorded the population of Stanton under Bardon at 634 people, equally split in terms of sex. There was a dramatic population rise in early 1900s, but in recent years it has stayed relatively. Between 2001 and 2011 there has been a shift in religious views, portrayed by the pie charts. It shows that the Christian population is reducing in Stanton under Bardon and slowly diversifying towards other religions and to atheism. Census also showed that "traditional households" are declining in Stanton under Bardon as households are gradually increasing in cohabiting unmarried couples and single parent households. The education rates for Stanton under Bardon have improved since 2001. Census depicted that the percentage of over 16s with no qualification had lowered by 6.3% over 10 years. In the same time period, the number of 16–75 years olds with level 3 qualifications for examples Alevels increased by 5% and the number of residents with level 4 (degree level) has increased by 7.2%.

Stanton under Bardon shows rates of high employment in specific areas, suggesting that they specialise in certain occupations. Agriculture and industry in materials, excelled as popular employment in the 1880s in the village. Stanton under Bardon is near Cliffe Hill Quarry and Bardon Hill Quarry explaining the popularity in industry materials based employment. 2011 occupation statistics illustrate a change from primary sectors to tertiary and quaternary sectors. There were 336 residents in employment, professional occupations and process, plant and machine operatives each made 13.9% of Stanton under Bardon's employment figures. Closely followed by associate professional and technical occupations and skilled trade occupations both contributing 13.6% to the total employment of the area.

== Cliffe Hill Quarry ==
Cliffe Hill Quarry in Stanton under Bardon has been producing granite since the 1860s and has employed many local residents. By 1891, the Cliffe Hill Quarry was produced around 10,000 tonnes of granite annually. The Cliffe Hill Granite Company Ltd was formed as a result of the mining success in 1894. Cliffe Hill Granite Company was acquired by Tarmac Roadstone in 1965 and by 1980 the planning for the New Cliffe Hill Quarry (also known as Stud Farm Quarry) was undertaken. The former Cliffe Hill Quarry closed in 1989. Tarmac Roadstone Products LTD has invested £33,000,000 into developing the quarry into one of the largest quarries in Europe. However in 2006, mining at the New Cliffe Hill Quarry ceased.

== See also ==
- Cliffe Hill Mineral Railway
