= Anstey, Leicestershire =

Village in Leicestershire, England

Coordinates: 52.67148°N 1.19546°W

Anstey
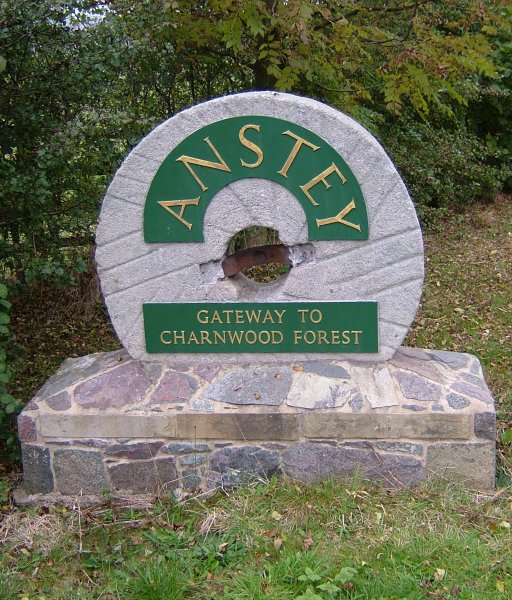
- 'Anstey - Gateway to Charnwood Forest' sign seen on entering the village

- Location within Leicestershire
- Area: 6.25 sq mi (16.2 km^{2})
- Population: 7,697 (2011 Census)
  - Density: 1,232/sq mi (476/km^{2})
- OS grid reference: SK545085
- District: Charnwood
- Shire county: Leicestershire
- Region: East Midlands
- Country: England
- Sovereign state: United Kingdom
- Post town: LEICESTER
- Postcode district: LE7
- Dialling code: 0116
- Police: Leicestershire
- Fire: Leicestershire
- Ambulance: East Midlands
- UK Parliament: Mid Leicestershire

Anstey is a large village in Leicestershire, England, located north west of Leicester in the borough of Charnwood. Its population was 7,697 at the 2021 census. This figure is expected to increase due to the building of a new housing development off Groby Road. The village is separated from Leicester by the Rothley Brook, Castle Hill Park and the A46, and it borders the villages of Glenfield, Groby, Newtown Linford, Cropston and Thurcaston as well as the suburb of Beaumont Leys and Anstey Heights. To the north-west lies Bradgate Park.

Anstey is known as the Gateway to Charnwood Forest. It is a combination of traditional English village (with two village greens - the top green and bottom green) and an industrial town (with several 19th-century hosiery factories, many of which are now being turned into apartments) which is made up mostly of a number of small estates, both council and private which are intertwined, often with no clear border.

== History ==
Anstey dates back to Angle origins, when it was known as Hanstige (later Anstige), meaning a narrow forest track (specifically the meaning is either 'one-way' or 'steep road'). Anstey was positioned between Charnwood Forest and Leicester Forest.

Whilst developing the site for the new Co-op store in 2002 archaeologists were called in and found remains dating back to the 12th century. A plaque recording this has been placed on the wall of the new shop.

The place-name of Anstey is first recorded in Domesday Book of 1086, when it was held by one of the county's largest landholders, Hugh de Grandmesnil, castellan of Leicester. At the time it was a small farming community.

Anstey appears to have had its origins in two distinct settlement foci, each associated with a separate manor, one associated with Leicester Abbey and one with the Ferrers of Groby.

It is believed that Anstey once had a sizable military force - in 1431 William Porter "furnished XIX hommes and IX archers".

When Bonnie Prince Charlie's army moved south during the 1745 rebellion, although the main body of troops were turned back at Derby, a foraging party reached the commons of Anstey.

Local industry included hosiery from the eighteenth to the nineteenth century, leading to a rise in population to around 600 by 1800. By 1845 there were 300 people employed as framework knitters in the village. A decline in the industry in the middle of the nineteenth century saw a fall in the village's population, although hosiery manufacture continued in the village until the mid-twentieth century. Boot and shoe manufacture became a more important part of the village's work between 1860 and 1900, and the first employer in Leicestershire described as a "boot and shoe manufacturer" appeared in Anstey in 1863. The village's population rose to over 2,500 by 1900, with a corresponding rise in housebuilding. Anstey became an independent parish in 1866, having previously been a chapelry of Thurcaston. A number of related industries developed in the village, including tanning and box-making, the latter still present in the village. One of the largest companies in the village was the Anstey Wallpaper Company, which occupied a site east of Cropston Road now filled with houses and the new Co-op store. Nearly all the local factories have now either been demolished or converted into flats. By 1971, the population of the village had risen to almost 6,000. The village is still the home of Ulverscroft Large Print Books Ltd., known for their large-print editions of popular books, published since 1964.

The most notable family of Anstey was the Martin family, who lived in the village from the 13th century until 1892. Two members of the family held the position of Lord Lieutenant of Leicestershire, and the local high school is named after them. They lived at Anstey Pastures (now demolished), before moving to The Brand in 1892.

Famous past Anstey residents include Ned Ludd (Ludlam), the machine-wrecker whose name was appropriated by the Luddites - whose name was adopted in a recent household development in the village: Ned Ludd Close, and snooker player and commentator Willie Thorne, who started playing snooker at the village's Conservative club. Footballer Derek Dougan lived in the village during his time at Leicester City.

According to legend, the last wolf to be killed in England was shot in a forest "near Anstige in Wolfdale". Wolfdale was a nearby district towards Newtown Linford, and the name has survived in a slightly altered form with Wooldale Close, one of the streets in the village.

== Religion ==
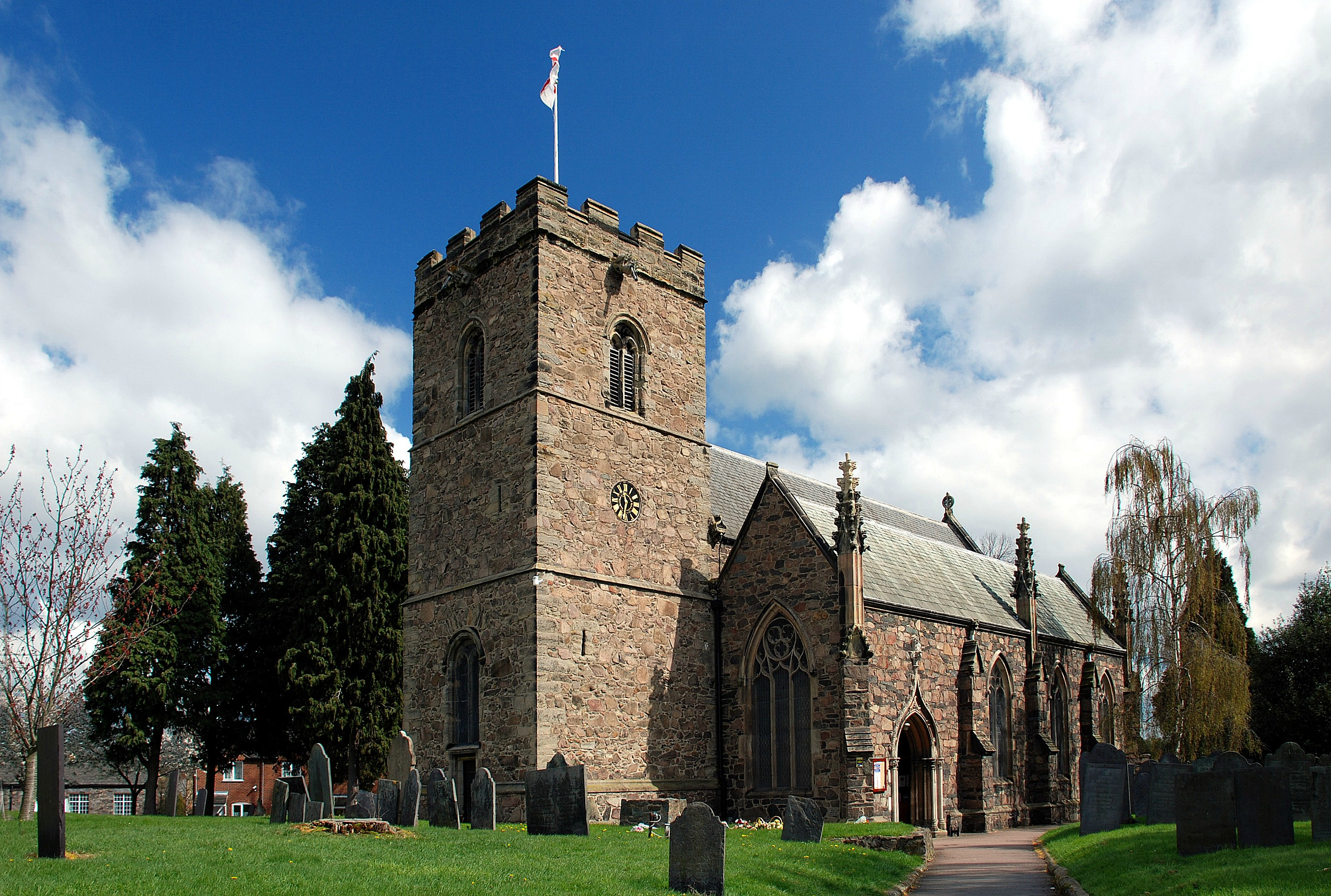
St. Mary's parish church, Anstey

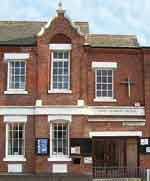
Anstey Methodist Church

There are Church of England, United Reformed and Methodist churches in the village.

The parish church of St. Mary is on Bradgate Road, just out of The Nook, has the remains of a fifteenth-century preaching cross and was previously part of the Parish of Thurcaston.

The United Reformed church is further up Bradgate Road.

The Methodist church is situated near The Nook on Cropston Road, and is a medium-sized church serving the community, being part of the Leicester West Circuit of the Oxford and Leicester District of the Methodist Church. An earlier Methodist church was located on the opposite side of the road to the current church, until it was demolished in the 1980s.

== Education ==
The earliest purpose-built school for children in Anstey was on Bradgate Road, built in 1873 and now a Grade II listed building that has been converted to flats; For many years after later schools were built this continued to serve as the village's infant school until it closed in 1982 whereupon the teaching of infants was relocated to nearby Latimer Primary School. There was also an Adult School & Institute on Church Lane, the building now occupied by a printing company.

There are currently three schools in Anstey:

- Latimer Primary School, Latimer Street - original building from 1896
- Woolden Hill Primary School, Netherfield Road - opened 1977
- The Martin High School, Anstey, Link Road - opened 1957, now a secondary academy for 11- to 16-year-olds

College students go to The Cedars Academy at Birstall. They may also go to English Martyrs RC School on Anstey Lane, Brookvale High School in Groby, or Rawlins Community College in Quorn (Out of catchment area).

=== The Martin High School ===
In March 2008, The Martin High was placed 10th best school in the country and 3rd best in the county for pupils' progress between the ages of 11 and 14.

== The village ==
Anstey retains some of the charm of a traditional village particularly on the area immediately north of the village centre, but due to its industrial background there are many small terraced houses as well as some pre-fabricated post war council houses in the 'Dutch barn' style. The large houses towards the top of Bradgate Road change into terraced houses in the old industrial area, and then modern suburbia out towards Link Road, where the Anstey Martin school can be found. Just off the Nook is Latimer primary school, named after Bishop Latimer.

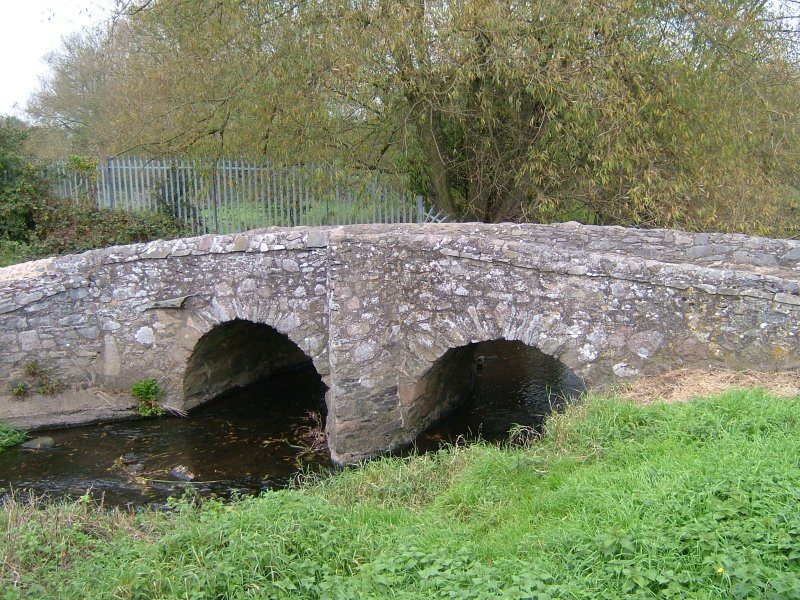
King William's Bridge, Anstey

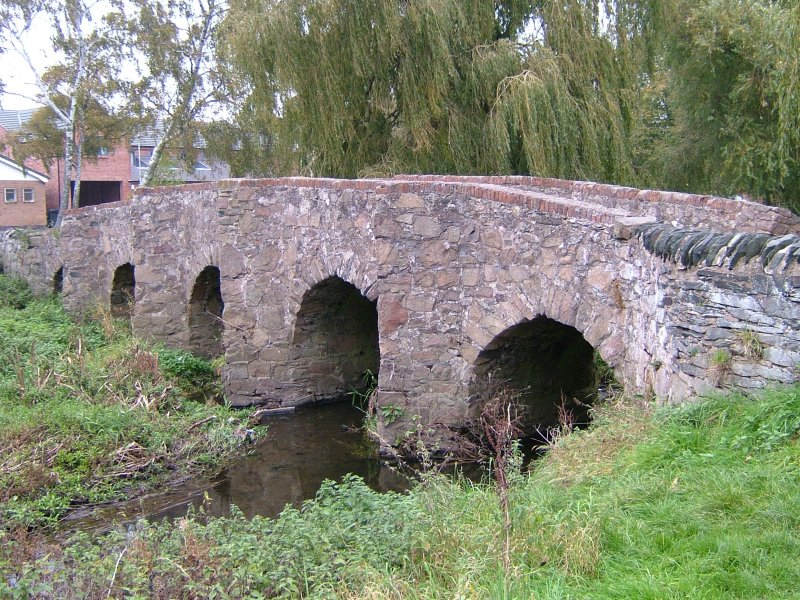
Packhorse Bridge, Anstey

The Rothley Brook flows through the village on its way to the River Soar, and there are two ancient bridges (the Packhorse Bridge and King William's Bridge) and an old water mill. The packhorse bridge is on the route of the original road from Leicester. King William's Bridge is so named because when King William III planned to visit the Grey family at Bradgate in 1696, the existing crossings of the Rothley Brook were found to be too narrow for the Royal coach, so a new bridge had to be constructed.

Anstey also has a GP surgery, dentist, funeral directors and opticians, and several fast food outlets and restaurants. Around The Nook there are a number of different shops, a post office, as well as pubs - The Coach and Horses, The Crown and The Old Hare and Hounds as well as a Conservative club. The Working men's club closed in 2009 and The Plough pub in 2012.

In the past Anstey had two cinemas, the Savoy on Cropston Road which was later used as a petrol station/garage before being converted into a pub/restaurant and eventually a furnishings shop, and another on Ellis Street, which now sells wine.

=== Local newspaper ===
For many years, the village had its own newspaper, Anstey Scene, which was a quarterly with news about local events and council meetings. Other local publications included the Anstey Directory with advertisements for local businesses, including from the Birstall and Glenfield areas, and The Anstey Clarion, a monthly which took reader submitted articles. All of these have now ceased to publish. There is, however, a publication entitled Your Local which is published monthly.

=== Local area ===
Nearby Glenfield is the home of Leicestershire County Council, and all the shops and facilities of the city can be found about four miles (6 km) away in Leicester.

Castle Hill Park lies to the East of the village, connecting Anstey to Beaumont Leys and with the A46 Leicester Western Bypass running through it.

Bradgate Park, childhood home of Lady Jane Grey, stretches above the village, between the two neighbouring villages of Newtown Linford and Cropston. For transport, Anstey is served by regular bus services to Leicester and the Beaumont Shopping Centre (about a mile away in Beaumont Leys), and less regular services to Loughborough. By road, Anstey is just off the A46 Leicester Western Bypass, which provides a fast link to the M1 southbound to London, with the A50 providing access to the M1 North.

=== Sport ===
Anstey is home to Anstey Nomads Football Club who play in the East Midlands Counties League.

Prior to the Second World War there were two separate teams, the Methodist and St. Marys Parish Church football teams. However, following the War in 1947 the two teams merged and became Anstey Nomads. The ground, which is owned by the club, is situated on Cropston Road, Anstey. In addition to the Anstey Nomads there is the youth football team, Anstey Swifts. There also is another local football team, Anstey Town, who play in the Midland Football League.

There are also Rugby Union (Anstey RFC, formed 1980, who play on the Link Road playing fields) and Cricket teams, who play in the local leagues. Anstey and Glenfield CC play in the Leicestershire and Rutland Cricket League at Gynsill Lane playing field on the Anstey/Glenfield border, they have two senior teams playing in Division 6 and Division 8, one friendly XI playing numerous Sunday friendlies as of 2016. Anstey Narborians play on the recreation ground at Stadon Road, in the Leicestershire League.

Anstey has three recreation grounds - the main park ("The Reccy") off Stadon Road which has facilities including floodlit multi play/tennis court area, swings, slides, football pitch and a small area for younger children. From May 2009 it has a kicking wall and shelter to the side of the Jubilee Hall (APC office) built by Anstey Parish council. There is a less well equipped one near Link Road which is occasionally used by the Anstey RFC. Millfield Close also has a small area with play equipment on, which is rented from Charnwood Borough Council.

=== Ley lines ===
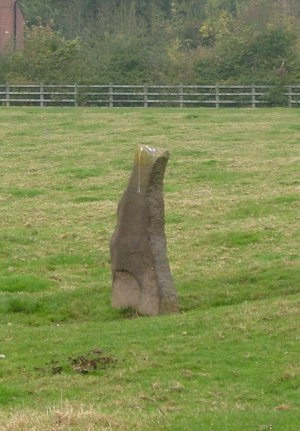
Standing stone, Anstey

Anstey and surrounding area have been mentioned in several texts about ley lines. Anstey has a standing stone and a place called The Leys, which marks the route of the Bradgate Ley, which runs between a notch in the hill near Old John in Bradgate Park, and Oadby.

=== Transport ===
Anstey is served by frequent buses operated by First Leicester service 74 with some infrequent buses running on Centrebus service 154 and Diamond East Midlands service 125.

The nearest network railway station is at Leicester.

== See also ==
- Leicester
- Glenfield, Leicestershire
- Newtown Linford
- Groby
- Cropston
- Beaumont Leys
