= Leicester Forest =

Former royal forest in England

Coordinates: 52.62°N 1.24°W

Leicester Forest was a royal forest that existed to the west of Leicester, England.

== Site and history ==
The forest occupied an area 14 miles (23 km) long and 4 miles (6.4 km) wide between the River Soar and Rothley Brook, and covered 5,000 acres (2,000 ha). It was described in Domesday Book as 'Hereswode'. Once owned by Hugh de Grandmesnil, ownership passed to successive Earls of Leicester. In the 13th century Leicester townsfolk had rights to acquire wood in part of the forest known as the Frith, an area now occupied by western districts of the city of Leicester and Glenfield. The wooded nature of the area declined, resulting in several areas being enclosed to preserve them and the establishment of hunting parks. In 1265 the ownership passed to Edmund Crouchback, and in the 14th century it became important as an area for hunting.

During the 15th and 16th centuries, the woodland declined due to over-exploitation, unlicensed felling and sheep grazing.

In John Leland's Itinerary, he identified four parks within the forest: 'The Parke of St. Mary Abbey' (Abbey Park), 'Bellemonte's Leye' (Beaumont Leys), 'Barne Park' (also known as Barrons Park, between Desford and Kirby Muxloe), and 'Tooley Park' (near Earl Shilton). Also within the forest area were Frith Park (the 'New Park', now partly occupied by the New Parks housing estate), Lubbesthorpe Park, Brokensale Park, West of Thurlaston, and Newhall Park at Normanton.

== Disafforestation and riot ==
In 1628, King Charles sanctioned the disafforestation of the area. During the 17th century the forest was sold in parts. The process of disafforestation caused riots among those affected by loss of rights to pasture and resources, as with other forests in the period, mainly in the west of England, where it was known as the Western Rising.

Sir Miles Fleetwood was commissioned to survey and disafforest Leicester in December 1626 and March 1627. Commoners were to receive compensation where they could show a valid claim; many would not be able to, if they had settled of their own accord. The Attorney General then ensured that the arrangements were confirmed by the court of Exchequer in February 1628. The King then let 1,598 acres (647 ha) to nearby landowners for 'fines' of £7,760 and small annual rents.

Riots occurred in response, destroying existing enclosures in spring 1627 and again in 1628 following the final division of the lands. Legal challenges were also made, against both the rioters and the enclosures. The enclosures were challenged by local inhabitants, the Corporation of Leicester and borough residents who submitted petitions to the King and Privy Council. The Privy Council found nothing unjust about the dealings of Fleetwood however, so challenges were made in the House of Lords in June 1628. the Lords however supported Fleetwood. An order was then made by the Lords praising Fleetwood for adding substantial income to the Crown but however to halt Star Chamber proceedings against the rioters. Buchanan Sharp concludes that "it may be surmised that a quid pro quo had been worked out: if the forest's inhabitants stopped rioting and petitioning, the government would drop all legal proceedings".

=== Compensation ===
The Crown made considerable compensation to local manorial lords and tenants as well as other residents. Five lords claimed around 2,755 acres (1,115 ha) were in use by their manors; of these 1,030 acres (420 ha) went to the King, and the rest to the manorial lords. The landowners had in turn to compensate their tenants for their losses. 554 acres (224 ha) acres went to tenants according to the size of their holdings, at around 4–6 acres (1.6–2.4 ha) to the yardland. Around 1.5-2 acres went to each cottage in addition. The Crown also compensated freeholders in other townships at a similar rate and gave 40 acres (16 ha) to the borough of Leicester for the maintenance of their poor. However, compensation would not have been made to the many families who had established homes on assart land (i.e., those who were occupying part of the forest without permission). The June 1628 petition to the House of Lords claimed that the families in 100 ancient cottages would not be compensated and neither would many more living in newly built cottages.

== After disafforestation ==
In the following centuries, much of the area was cleared to provide land for farming and housing. The forest's name persists in the name of two settlements: the village of Leicester Forest East and the hamlet Leicester Forest West.

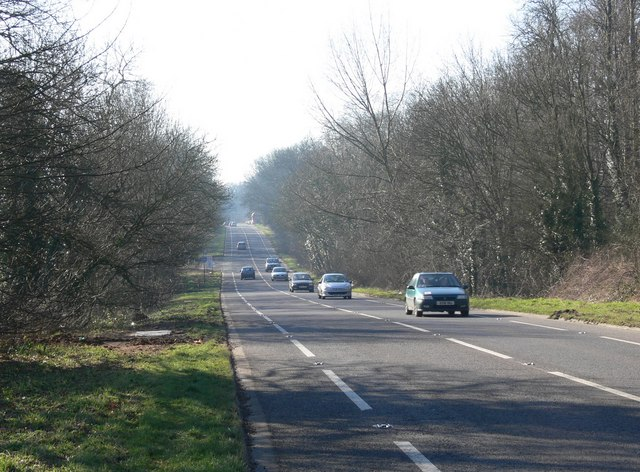
A47 road towards Earl Shilton in Leicester Forest.
