= The Martin High School, Anstey =

The Martin High School

Location
- Link Road; Anstey, Leicestershire, LE7 7EB; England; 52.678°N 1.191°W

Information
- Type: Academy
- Established: 1957
- Department for Education URN: 137828 Tables
- Ofsted: Reports
- Head teacher: Laura Sanchez
- Gender: Coeducational
- Age: 11 to 16
- Enrolment: 624
- Website: http://www.martinhigh.org

The Martin High School is a coeducational secondary school with academy status, located in the village of Anstey, Leicestershire, on the outskirts of Leicester. The school accepts students from nearby Beaumont Leys, Glenfield, Thurcaston and Cropston as well as some students from New Parks and Braunstone.

The school has won awards such as The Healthy Schools Award and in its most recent Ofsted inspection the school was graded "Good".

== History ==
The Martin High School was founded in 1957 and was named after Sir Robert Martin, Chairman of the Leicester County Council, in honour of his public service.

Originally a Secondary Modern school for pupils aged 11 to 16, then a middle school for ages 11 to 14 ages, in September 2013 The Martin High School became, again, a secondary school for pupils aged 11 to 16. The first GCSE results for the school were received in 2015.

== Notable former pupils ==
- Daniel Greaves
- Willie Thorne
