= List of castles in Leicestershire =

== List of castles ==
Castle	Image	Location	Type	Constructed	Scheduled	Notes
Ashby de la Zouch Castle		Ashby-de-la-Zouch; SK36061659	Fortified manor house	12th century	Yes	It was built on the site of an early Norman house which was incorporated into the new manor house which was constructed by Lord Hastings between 1464 and 1483. The castle was besieged during the English Civil War and was slighted once it fell to the Parliamentarians in 1646; after this it was abandoned as a home. As well as being protected as a Scheduled Ancient Monument, what remains of the castle is protected as a Grade I listed building.
Bagworth Castle		Bagworth				
Belvoir Castle		Vale of Belvoir (SK820337)	Romanticised Gothic Revival Stately Home	19th century	No	The site was originally the site of a Norman castle and was the site of a more traditional military castle until at least the English Civil War (1642–1651), at which time it was a stronghold of the King's supporters. The castle was rebuilt in a romanticised gothic style between 1799 and 1816 but was destroyed by fire in 1817. It was subsequently rebuilt in the same style. The Castle has been owned by the Manners family since the 16th Century; the family were created Duke of Rutland in 1703.
Donington Castle		Castle Donington				
Earl Shilton Castle		Earl Shilton				
Garthorpe Motte		Garthorpe, Leicestershire SK835209				
Gilmorton Motte		Gilmorton				
Groby Castle		Groby				
Gumley Castle		Gumley				
Hallaton Castle		Hallaton				
Hinckley Castle		Hinckley				
Ingarsby Monks Grave		Ingarsby SK68150489				
Kibworth Harcourt Castle		Kibworth Harcourt				
Kirby Muxloe Castle		Kirby Muxloe	Moated Fortified manor house	15th century	Yes	The castle was constructed on the site of an earlier manor house. Construction was started in 1480, but stopped following the execution of William Hastings, 1st Baron Hastings in 1483. The castle was then left incomplete. It was sold by the Hastings family in 1630, and used as a farm until 1911 when the Ministry of Works took over the site and undertook repairs. It is currently managed by English Heritage.
Leicester Castle		Leicester				
Mountsorrel Castle		Mountsorrel SK5818514891			Yes	
Ravenstone Castle		Ravenstone, Leicestershire				
Sapcote Castle		Sapcote SP486934				
Sauvey Castle		Withcote				
Shackerstone Castle		Shackerstone				
Shawell Castle		Shawell				
Whitwick Castle		Whitwick				
