= Leicester Forest West =

Hamlet and civil parish in Leicestershire, England

Coordinates: 52.610°N 1.266°W

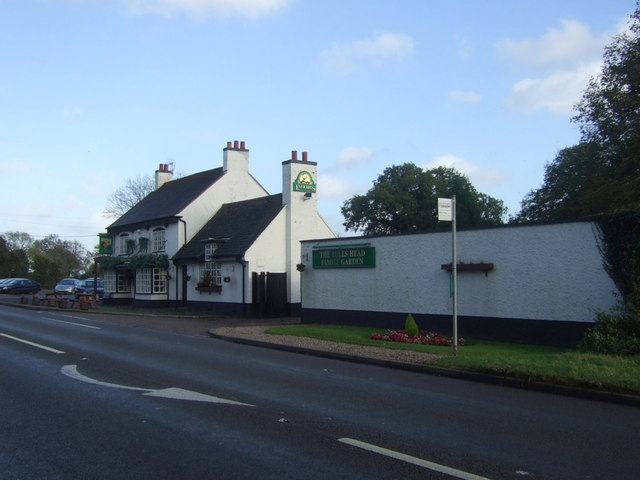
The Bull's Head

Leicester Forest West is a hamlet and civil parish in the Blaby district of Leicestershire, England. It has a population of c. 30, making it smaller than its neighbour Leicester Forest East. The village is named for the ancient Leicester Forest.
