= St Mary's Church, Anstey =

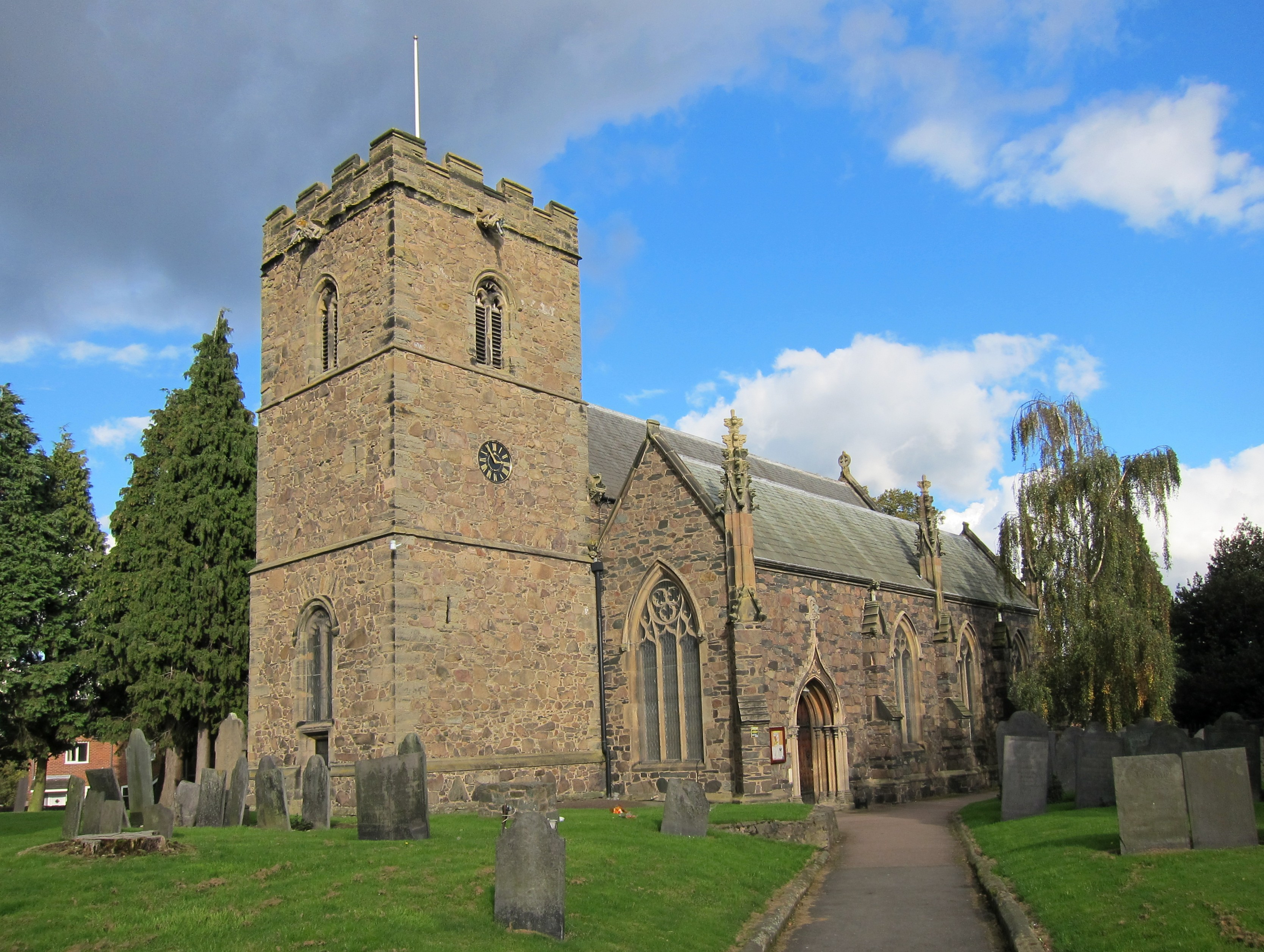
- The Church viewed from the South-west
- St Mary's Church, Anstey
- 52.6720°N 1.1888°W
- OS grid reference: SK 54948 08566
- Country: England
- Denomination: Church of England
- Website: www.ansteyparishchurch.org.uk

History
- Founded: 14th century

Specifications
- Materials: Mountsorrel granite & Swithland slate

Administration
- Diocese: Leicester
- Parish: Anstey, Leicestershire

St Mary's Church is the Church of England parish church in Anstey, Leicestershire, in the Diocese of Leicester.

== The church ==
The church is situated in the medieval heart of Anstey.

Built from Mountsorrel granite and Swithland slate, with a Westmorland slate roof, the church is of Norman origin from the 14th or 15th century, although much of the church was rebuilt at a cost of £4,000 by Broadbent & Hawley between 1845 and 1846 at the expense of the then Rector, Revd. Richard Waterfield, B.D. A Norman doorway remains on the North side of the church. Some of the gargoyles, which are placed on three sides, are Early English. The church is a grade II listed building. Records show that in 1220 a chapel in Anstey was annexed to the parish of Thurcaston; Anstey became a parish in 1867.

The windows include memorials to the Revd. Richard Waterfield (East chancel) and Elliot John Norman Galer (South aisle), and one commemorating those who lost their lives in World War I.

The tower contains eight bells, the tenor bearing the inscription "Recast in the year of the accession of King Edward VIII", believed to be the only one in Britain to bear such an inscription, due to Edward's short reign. The church organ was built by Taylors of Leicester in 1926. In the South wall of the tower is a clock made by W. Jolley of Leicester, which was given to the church in 1772 by Robert and Thomas Martin, who at the time were churchwardens.

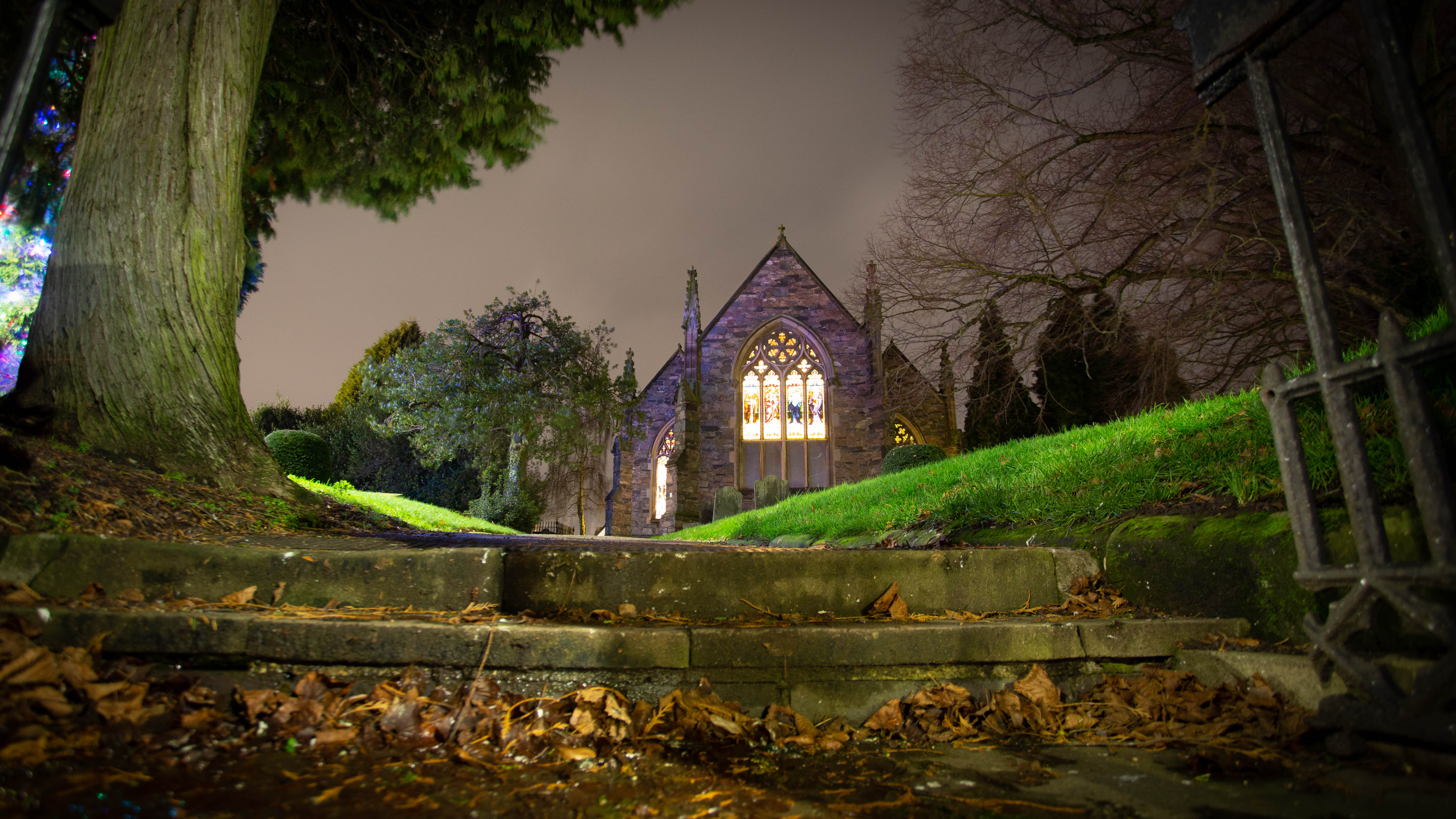

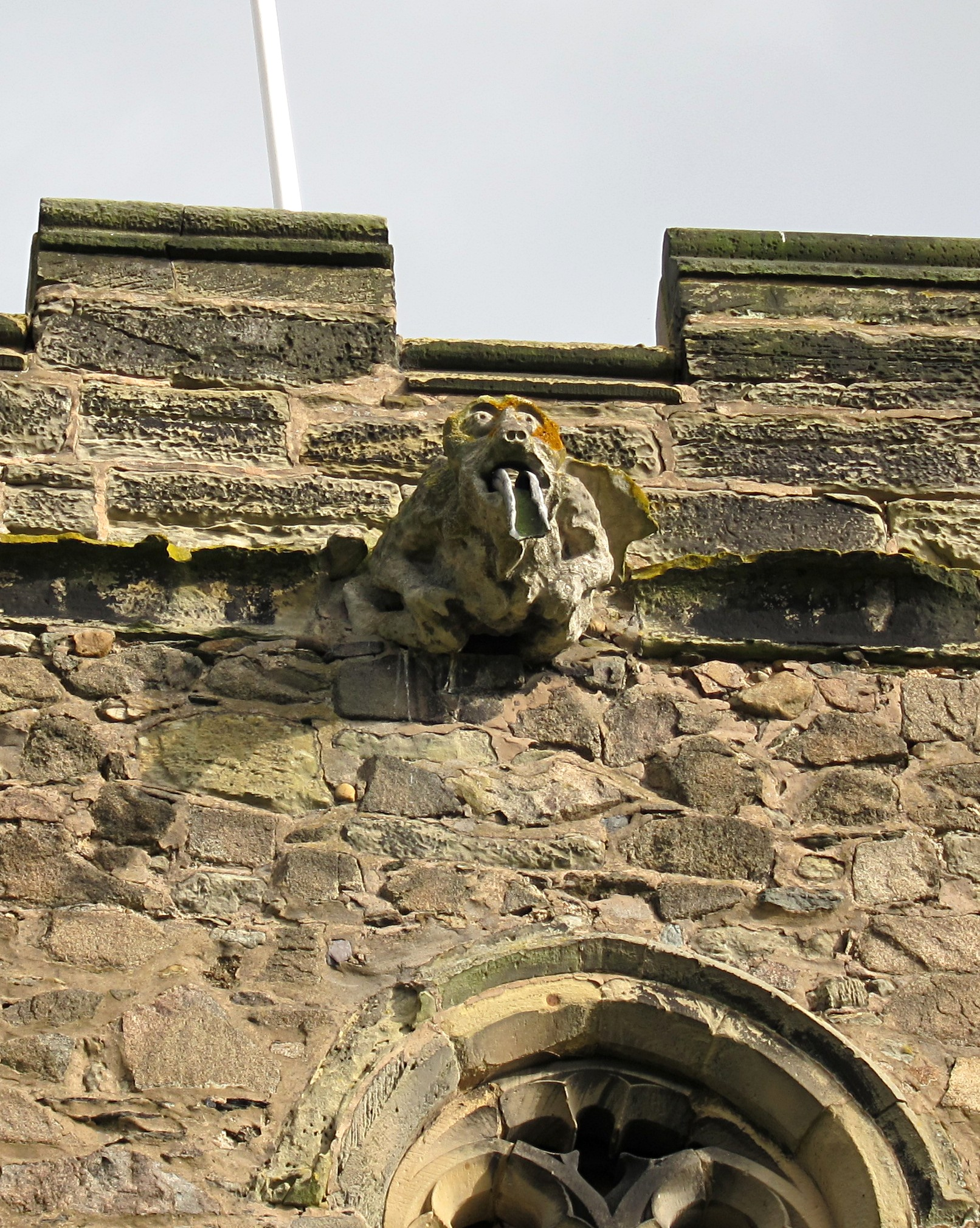
Gargoyle, North wall of tower

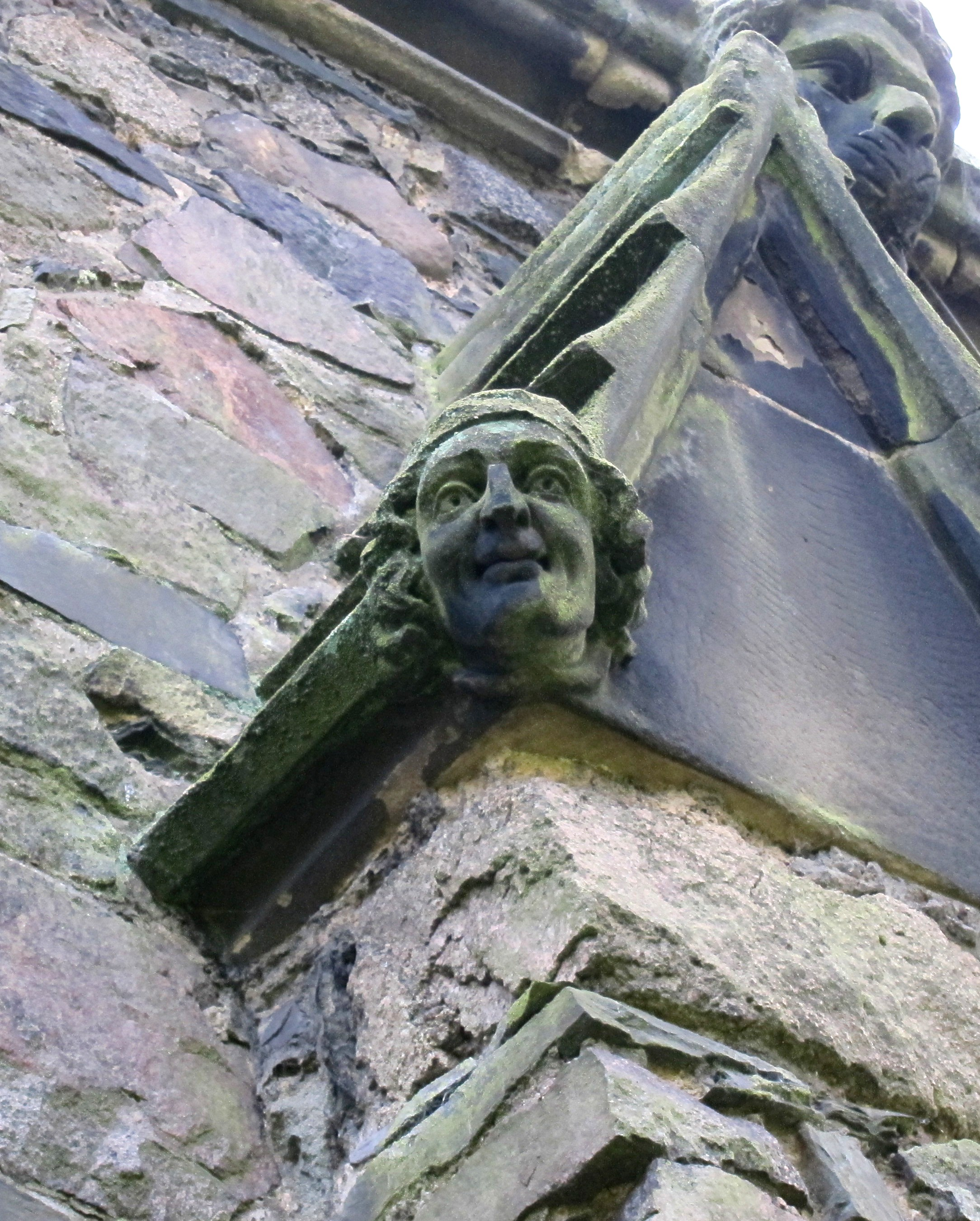
Head carving

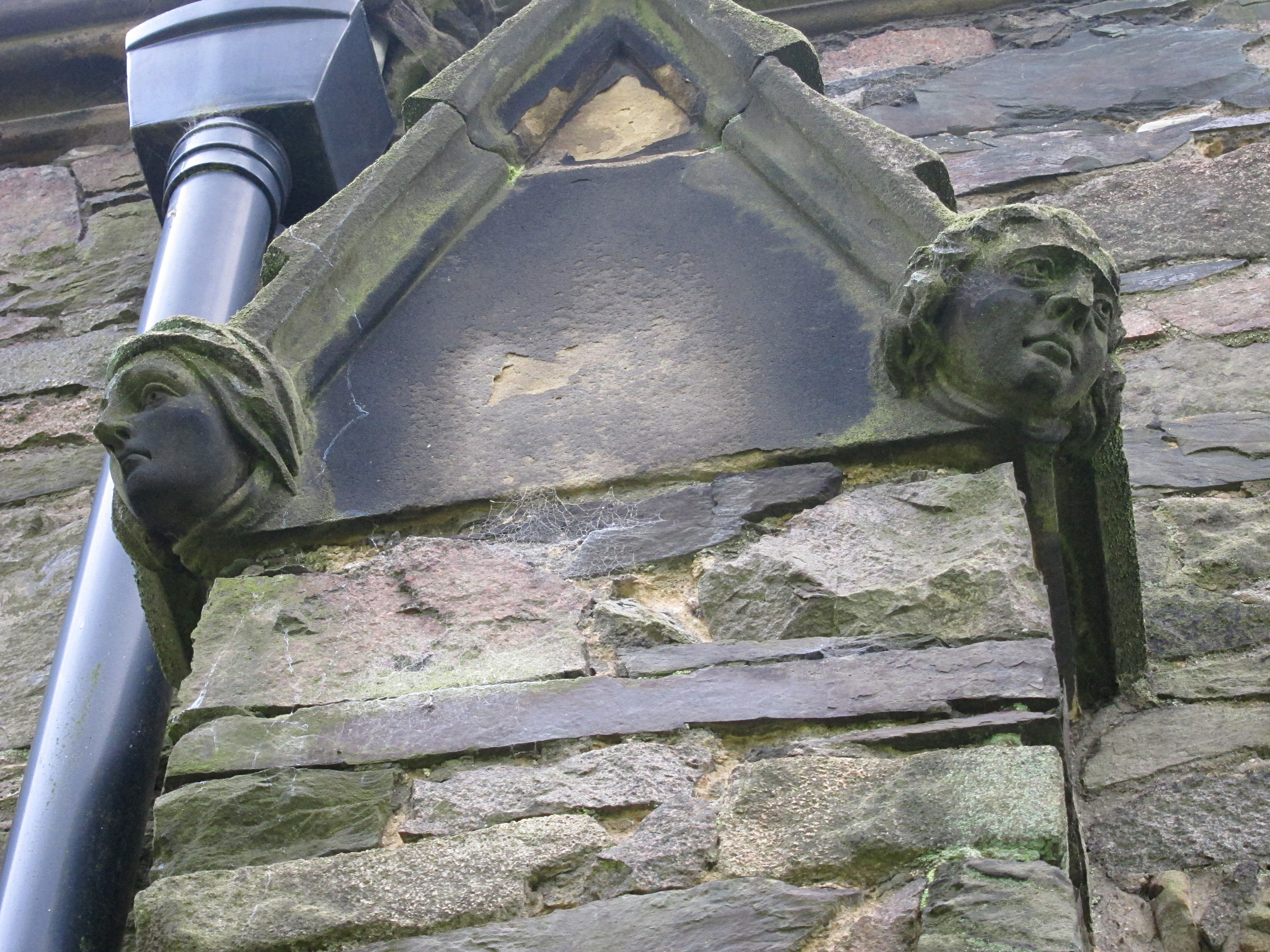
Head carvings

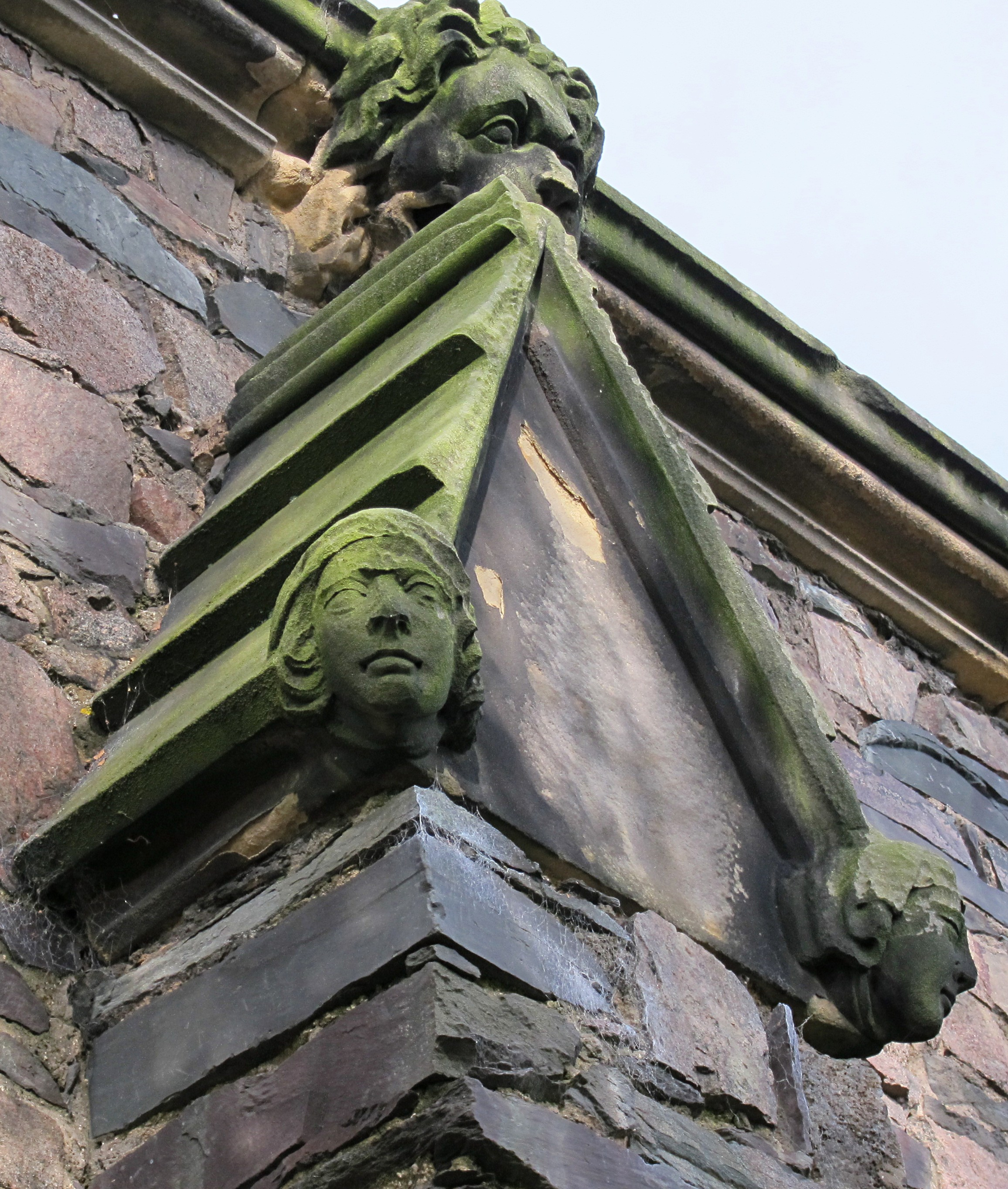
Head carvings & lion head gargoyle

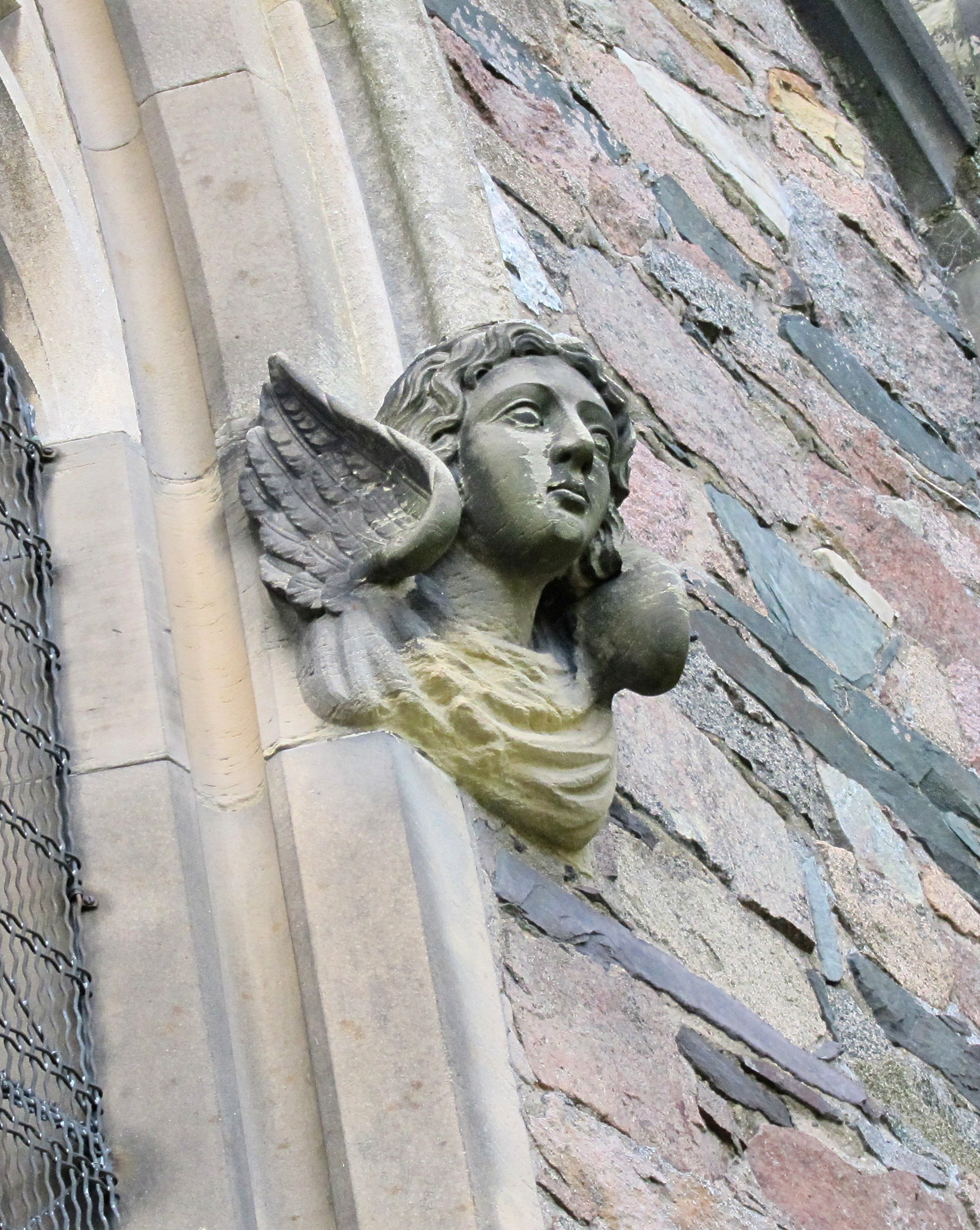
Angel carving

== Churchyard ==
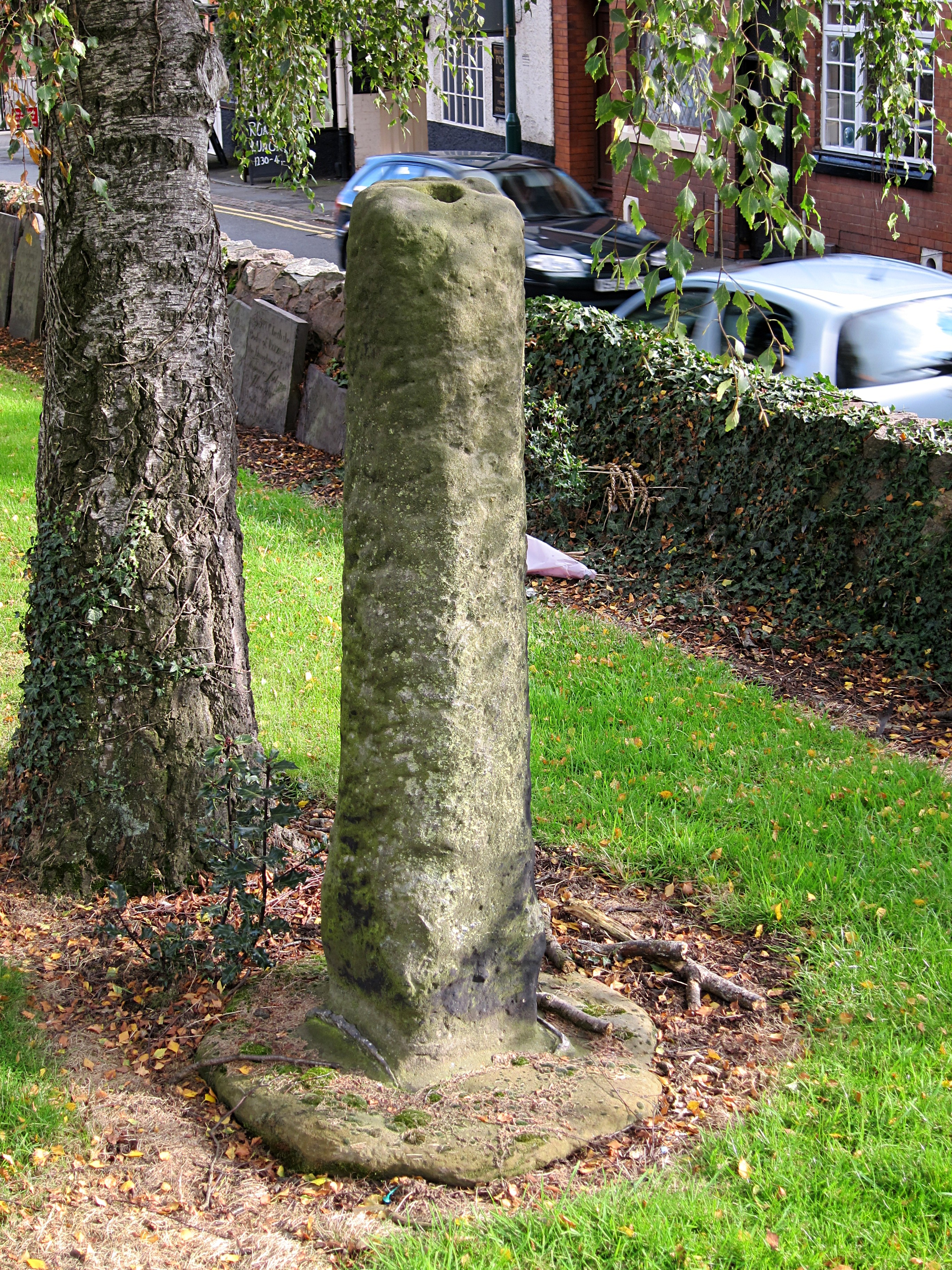
Shaft of 15th century cross

The churchyard contains the grade II listed Heard Family tombs, built in 1740 and 1803 with headstones from 1739 and 1743.

The church yard also contains the remains of a 15th-century cross, comprising a socket stone and part of the shaft. This is grade II listed and a scheduled monument.

The wall which surrounds the churchyard on three sides is also a grade II listed building.
