= Thurcaston and Cropston =

Civil parish in Leicestershire, England

Coordinates: 52.69°N 1.17°W

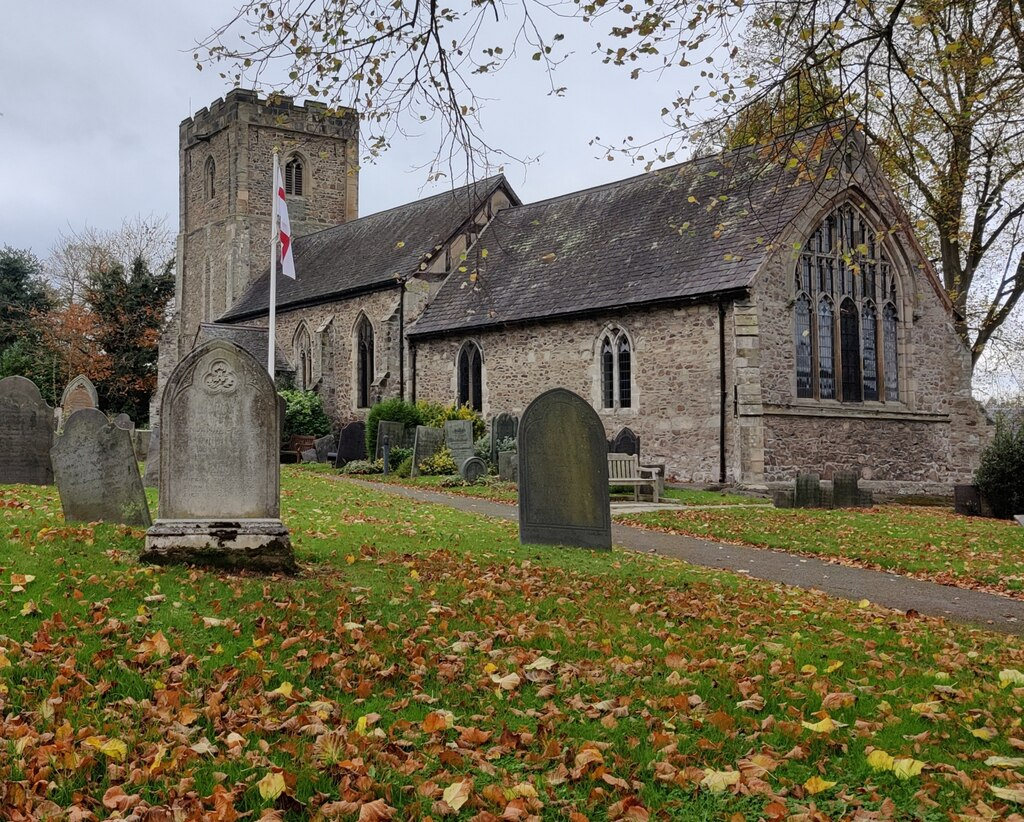
All Saints Church in Thurcaston.

Thurcaston and Cropston is a civil parish in Leicestershire, England. As its name suggests, it consists of the villages of Thurcaston and Cropston. The parish had a population at the 2001 Census of 2,076, with around 1,200 in Cropston and 800 in Thurcaston. The population of the civil parish was 2,074 at the 2011 census. The villages are separated by the Rothley Brook.

== History ==
Thurcaston is best known for being the home of Bishop Hugh Latimer.

== Governance & religion ==
Thurcaston and Cropston civil parish falls under the Charnwood Borough Council ward of Rothley and Thurcaston, the Leicestershire County Council division of Bradgate, and the parliamentary constituency of Charnwood, whose MP is Edward Argar of the Conservative Party.

In the Church of England, it falls under the province of Canterbury, the diocese of Leicester, the archdeaconry of Loughborough, and the deanery of Sparkenhoe East.
