= Brookvale Groby Learning Campus =

Location
- Ratby Road; Groby, Leicestershire, LE6 0FP; England
- Coordinates: 52.6584°N 1.2356°W

Information
- Type: Academy
- Motto: Valuing everyone, achieving excellence
- Department for Education URN: 138323 Tables
- Ofsted: Reports
- Headteacher: Will Teece
- Gender: Coeducational
- Age: 11 to 19
- Enrolment: 1510
- Website: brookvalegroby.com

Brookvale Groby Learning Campus is a coeducational secondary school and sixth form located in Groby in the English county of Leicestershire.

The school was created in September 2012 from Groby Community College and Brookvale High School. Previously they were both community schools administered by Leicestershire County Council. Both schools converted to academy status in partnership in July 2012. As the former schools were sited next to each other, the combined school teaches across an amalgamated campus.

Brookvale Groby Learning Campus offers GCSEs and BTECs as programmes of study for pupils, while students in the sixth form have the option to study from a range of A Levels and further BTECs. On 1 September 2025 Brookvale Groby Learning Campus joined the TMET trust.

== Notable former pupils ==
- Will Alves, footballer
- Louis Dodds, footballer
- Alison King, actress

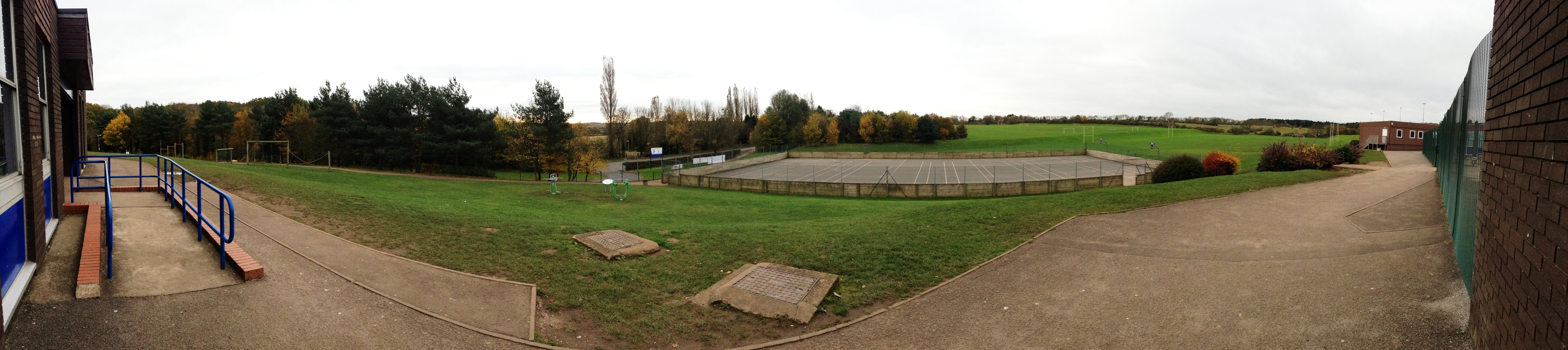
Brookvale Groby Learning campus
