= Graham Barnfield =

British academic

Graham Barnfield (born 5 November 1969 in Leicester) is a British academic and pundit associated with the hard left Revolutionary Communist Party (1981–1997).

In 1993 he began writing on cultural politics in the United States under President Franklin D. Roosevelt. Barnfield also comments on documentary representation, leading to some radio and television appearances discussing reality television and happy slapping. He teaches journalism at the University of East London.

He is the former editor of Culture Matters: Communications, Media & Communities (Sheffield Hallam University Press) and was a 2003 Fellow of the Wolfsonian-FIU.

He received a BA (Hons) in English with media studies, from the University of Sussex in 1992, and a PhD in cultural studies with the dissertation Co-opting Culture: State Intervention in and Party Patronage of Literary and Popular Culture, 1929–1941, from Sheffield Hallam University in 1996.

As a teenager, he was a vocalist in Leicester rock band the Marmite Sisters. He briefly developed a sideline as a bit-part actor, including a feature credit in Number One Longing, Number Two Regret and now writes for a wide range of publications.

== Partial filmography ==
=== Film ===
Year	Film	Role	Notes
2013	The Thinker in the Supermarket		voiceover
2005	Plato's Breaking Point		scenes re-shot
2004	Number One Longing, Number Two, Regret	Woods' guy	
2001	Mr In-Between	Dancing party guest	uncredited

=== Television ===
Year	TV show	Role	Notes
2007	The Real Outlaws	Himself – Interviewee	
1997	Police 2020		

== Marmite Sisters ==
The Marmite Sisters were an indie band formed in 1984 from Glenfield, Leicestershire, England. They were initially known as the Anonymouse, with Barnfield on vocals, Steve Hill on guitar, Christopher Murphy on bass and Stub Robinson on drums.

The band's name changed to the Marmite Sisters in May 1986, undergoing multiple changes of line-up and personnel. The band's first release was the Kick Donkey cassette in 1988. This was followed by the Songs of Love and Lawnmowers cassette in 1989. The final line-up split up in 1994.

The band subsequently released the EP Gricers on a German label in February 1995 and made compilation appearances on Grapefruit Sunrise along with connected bands The Minogues and Cavalier Approach.

=== Discography ===
Belper (FLX) on Tea Records

Tug EP (FLX) 1991 on Tea Records

Gricers (7" MEL 16) 1995 on Meller Welle Produckte

==== Featured on compilations ====
C92 (K7) 1993 on Rainbow recordings – My White Amp

A Taste of Tea 1993 on Tea Records – Cheapday Returns; Rain
