= Widdowson Group =

British logistics company

A.M. Widdowson & Son Ltd.
- Company type: Private Company
- Genre: Logistics
- Founded: 1902
- Founder: Mr A.M. Widdowson
- Defunct: circa 2017
- Headquarters: Glenfield, Leicestershire, England, United Kingdom
- Number of locations: 4
- Area served: Worldwide
- Key people: Peter Stevenson (MD); Harry Hawksworth (TD); John Hawksworth (CD); Arnaud Arhainx (FD)
- Services: Logistics; Transport; Warehouse; Freight; Garage Service; Rework; Contract Packing; LGV/HGV/FLT Training; Pallet Repair
- Revenue: £24,000,000 pa (2013)
- Owner: Widdowson Family
- Number of employees: 330 (2013)
- Website: widdowson-group.com

Widdowson Group's First Commercial Motorised Vehicle.

A Commercial Vehicle in 2008 outside main reception.

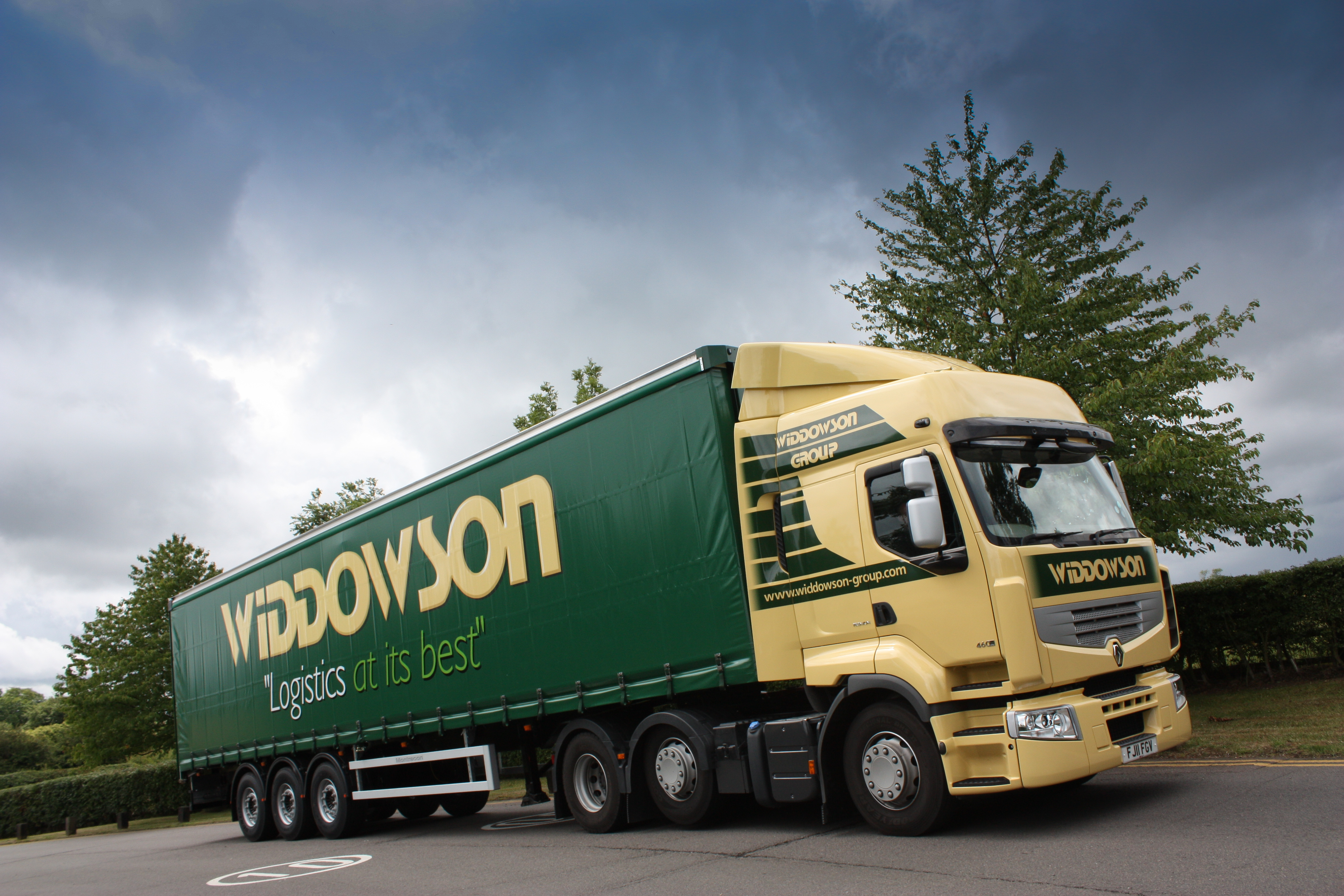
2011 Widdowson Group Vehicle and Trailer Livery.

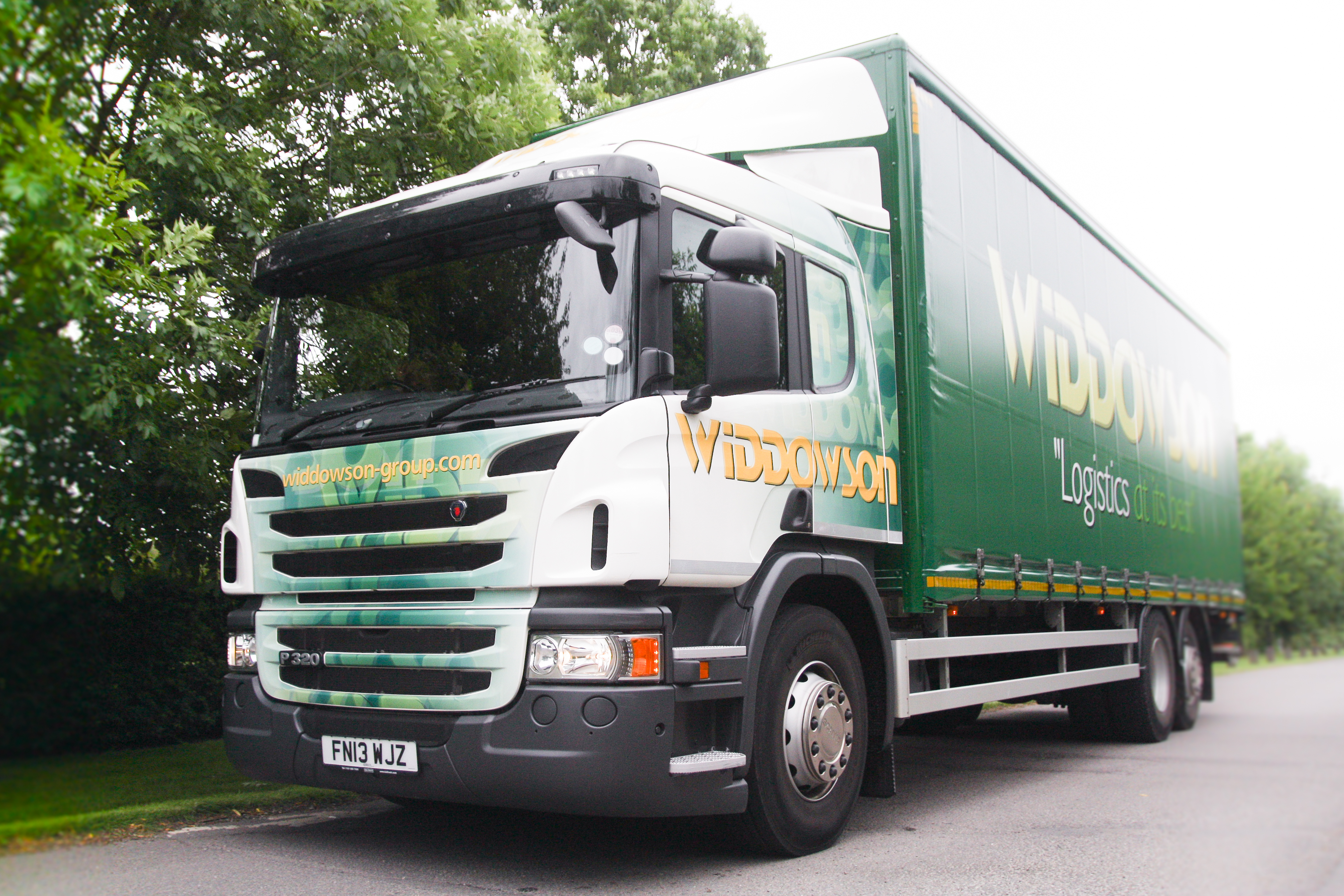
2013 Widdowson Group Liveried Scania P320 Lorry

Widdowson Group was a family owned and operated British logistics company. They offered various services based around the logistics industry and road transportation services.

The company entered administration in 2017.

== History ==
Established in the early 1900s as A.M. Widdowson and Son, the Widdowson Group haulage business worked locally, moving coal within the Leicester area. By the late 1980s, the company expanded into an organisation that was providing services throughout the whole of Great Britain. The Widdowson Group operated through six separate trading divisions: logistics warehousing, contract packing, transport, freight forwarding, pallet repair, garage services and a commercial training academy.

== Divisions ==
Traffic (Transport, Haulage, Groupage, deliveries)
Road transport was the biggest Division of The Widdowson Group with a fleet with over 130 vehicles, mostly local businesses. The fleet extended from panic vans to 44 tonne artics and includes over 200 trailers. The division operates as two functions Groupage and Full Loads. Full Loads is where an entire vehicle is loaded for a single purpose, usually a single delivery. Groupage works on the basis of multi-client and multi-drops per vehicle.

Warehouse (Warehousing, Storage)
The Warehouse Division was based over several sites and rivaled the Traffic Division for the biggest turnover. The Widdowson Group had three warehouse sites operating over 700,000 sq. ft. of warehousing offering dedicated or shared user storage facilities in racked or bulk configuration on a contractual or short-term basis. The warehouse systems utilised EDI solutions with integrated RF and barcode scanning in their WMS supplied by Road Tech. Widdowson Group often tailored warehousing solutions to the customers they were dealing with, for historical customer PepsiCo the Widdowson Group dedicated a whole warehouse for that client. Where as the warehousing service offered to United Biscuits was that they stored pallets of their products goods amongst other customer's pallets.

Freight (International Freight, Freight Forwarding, World Shipping, VAT Receipt)
The Freight Office offered a range of international services such as import, export and bonded warehousing.

Garage (Vehicle Maintenance)
Originally established to maintain and service Widdowson's own fleet of vehicles and trailers, the Garage Division was an established commercial vehicle center. The Widdowson Group also offered personal car repairs for friends and family of the Widdowson Group.

Contract Pack (Rework, Added Value, Contract Packing, Reverse Logistics, Hand assembly )
This was the fastest growing Division of the Widdowson Group concentrating on added value tasks such as the repackaging, barcoding, inspection and labeling of goods. An example of the Contract Packing operation was when the Widdowson Group package Christmas gift-packs for Boots UK, the Contract Packing department took the raw products (often toiletries) and packed them into a decorative gift box along with extra gift items like socks.

Training (Training School, Driver Training)
The Commercial Training Academy offered LGV C, C+E courses and FLT training to both paying public looking to start a new career, private companies looking to develop internal staff and internally to train and retrain staff. One of the main focuses of the internal aspect of the training department is to improve the lorry drivers' emissions.

Pallet Repair
The Widdowson Group generated a profit from a pallet repair operation, where teams of its staff repaired damaged pallets to be used again.

== Locations ==
- Glenfield, Leicestershire
- Braunstone, Leicester
- Bardon, Coalville

== Memberships and Affiliates ==
BSI, UKWA, RHA, BIFA, BCMPA, RMIF, DSA

Widdowson Group had been executive box holders at Leicester City F.C. since the 1990s and are one of the longest serving executive box holders at the club. Widdowson Group were part of the consortium of 55 parties led by Gary Lineker who invested money to rescue the club from Administration in 2003.
