= Kirby Muxloe Castle =

Fortified manor house in Kirby Muxloe, Leicestershire, England

- Kirby Muxloe, Leicestershire
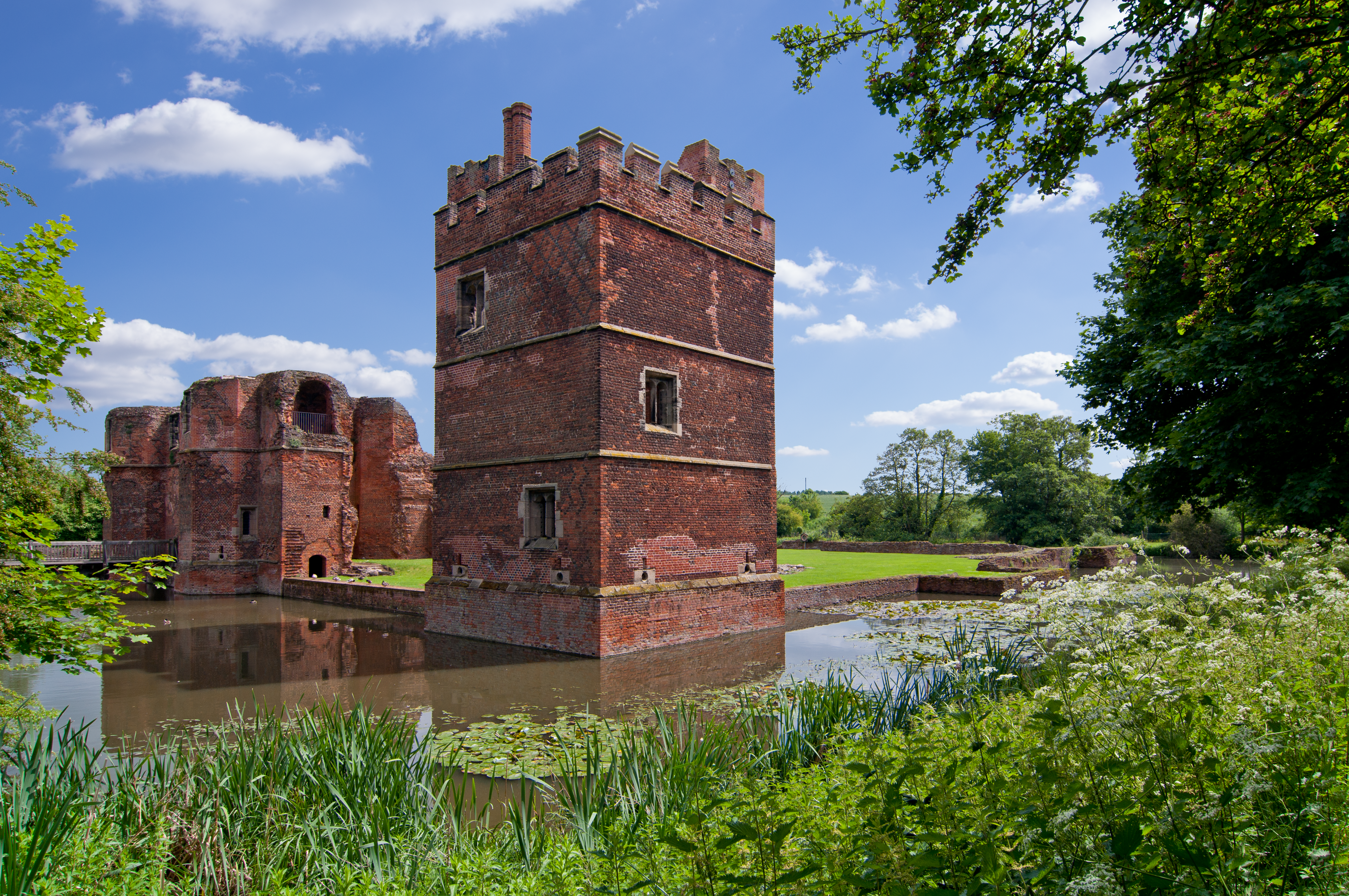
- The west tower and gatehouse (left)

Site information
- Type: Fortified manor house
- Owner: English Heritage
- Open to the public: Yes
- Condition: Ruined

Location
- Location within Leicestershire
- Coordinates: 52.6366°N 1.2272°W

Kirby Muxloe Castle, also known historically as Kirby Castle, is a ruined, fortified manor house in Kirby Muxloe, Leicestershire, England. William, Lord Hastings, began work on the castle in 1480, founding it on the site of a pre-existing manor house. William was a favourite of King Edward IV and had prospered considerably during the Wars of the Roses. Work continued quickly until 1483, when William was executed during Richard, Duke of Gloucester's, seizure of the throne. His widow briefly continued the project after his death but efforts then ceased, with the castle remaining largely incomplete. Parts of the castle were inhabited for a period, before falling into ruin during the course of the 17th century. In 1912, the Commissioners of Work took over management of the site, repairing the brickwork and carrying out an archaeological survey. In the 21st century, the castle is controlled by English Heritage and open to visitors.

The castle was rectangular in design, 245 by 175 feet (75 by 53 m) across, and would have comprised four corner towers, three side towers and a large gatehouse, all protected by a water-filled moat; the centre of the castle would have formed a courtyard. Of these buildings, only the gatehouse and the west tower survive today, partially intact. They are constructed with decorative brickwork and stone detailing, in a fashionable late 15th-century style, and have various symbols built into their walls using darker bricks. Twelve gunports for early gunpowder artillery were built into the walls of these two buildings, although historians are uncertain whether these defences were intended to be practical or symbolic. The government body Historic England considers the castle to be a "spectacular example of a late medieval quadrangular castle of the highest status".

== History ==
=== 15th–17th centuries ===
Kirby Muxloe Castle was built by William, Lord Hastings, the chamberlain of the royal household and a favourite of Edward IV. William had acquired extensive estates across the Midlands during the Wars of the Roses, much of it confiscated from his enemies. William's father, Sir Leonard, had maintained his seat at Kirby Muxloe, but William moved his own seat to the manor of Ashby de la Zouch in 1462. In 1474, Edward granted William the right to crenellate, or fortify, four of his manors and to build deer parks around them. Among these was Kirby Muxloe, which the King authorised to be turned into a castle and surrounded by a large park of 2,000 acres (810 ha).

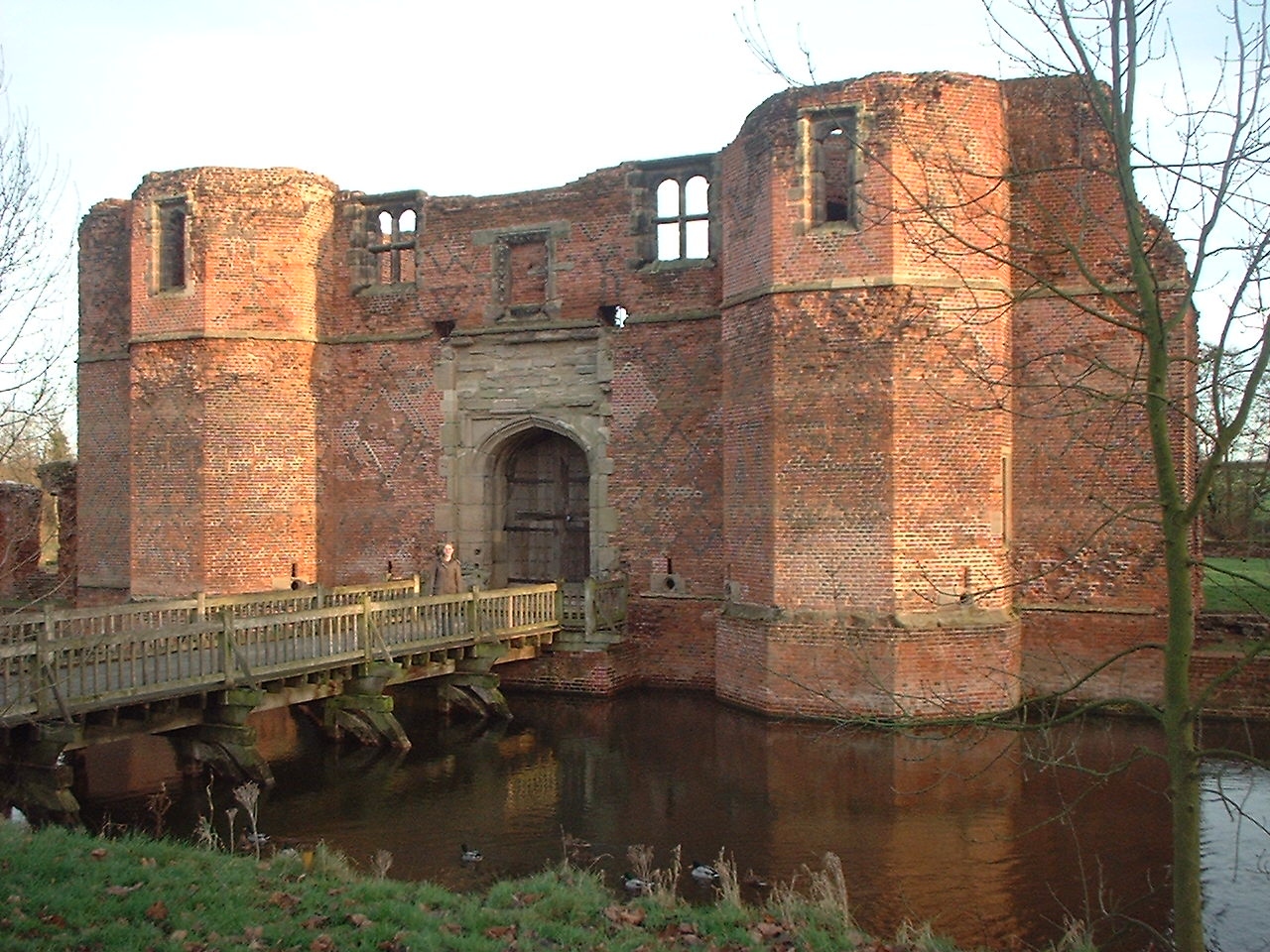
The exterior of the gatehouse

Work began on Kirby Muxloe Castle in October 1480, under the direction of Roger Bowlott, who was Lord Hasting's steward and became the clerk of works for the project. Most of the existing manor house was protected during the work, and probably continued in use while the new castle was built around it. A workshop able to make up to 100,000 bricks a week was constructed by Antony Yzebrond from Flanders. A brook was redirected to feed the new moat and a garden was established alongside the castle. Work intensified in early 1481, with the stonework being supervised by John Cowper, a master mason. The work progressed at speed and, at peak periods, over 40 men were working on the site. It is uncertain exactly how much of the castle was constructed, although at least one corner tower had been nearly completed by 1483 and the ground floor of the gatehouse laid down.

Edward IV died in 1483, leaving the kingdom to his young son, Edward V, but his uncle, Richard, Duke of Gloucester, had his own ambitions for the throne. Lord Hastings was unwilling to support the deposition of Edward V and, as a consequence, Richard summarily executed him that June, ahead of his own coronation. Kirby Muxloe and Lord Hasting's other estates were then restored to his widow, Katherine. After a short pause, Katherine continued some work on the site until the summer of 1484, focusing on making the corner tower and partially finished gatehouse habitable, before the project was finally halted. By this point around £1,000 had been spent on the works, including the laying of 1.3 million bricks. (Note: It is impossible to accurately compare 15th-century and modern prices or incomes. For comparison, the income of a typical baron in 1436 was less than £500 a year.)

At least initially, some parts of the castle were occupied, possibly including the remains of the original manor house. The castle continued to be owned by the Hastings family until around 1630, when it was purchased by Sir Robert Banaster, and then by William Wollaston. Over the course of the rest of the century, Kirby Muxloe Castle was abandoned; it was robbed for its building materials, and became used for agricultural purposes.

=== 18th–21st centuries ===
The ruins of the castle, depicted in 1826

The castle was purchased from the Wollaston family in 1788 by Clement Winstanley. In 1790, the remains of the north tower were still standing, albeit in very poor condition. Clement Winstanley reportedly wanted to pull the northern ruins down, intending to reuse the bricks to make a barn, but his son, also called Clement, intervened, and subsequently carried out repairs to the castle. By the 19th century the ruins were covered in ivy; by the early 20th century, trees were growing out of the tops of the walls, which were frequented by grazing goats and cattle. Much of the moat had silted up and the remains of the bridge had been buried by the accumulated debris.

By 1911, the owner Major Richard Winstanley was unable to pay for the upkeep of the castle and, concerned about its deteriorating condition, proposed placing the property into the guardianship of the Commissioners of Works. Following a survey by the architect Sir Frank Baines, which showed the ruins to need immediate repairs, the Commissioners took over the castle the following year. It was restored by Sir Charles Peers, the Inspector of Ancient Monuments, between 1912 and 1913. He stripped away any remains of the farm, cleared the vegetation from the walls and repaired the brickwork, re-cutting the moat and reconstructing a replica of the medieval bridge.

There had been hopes of finding additional remains during Peers' archaeological investigations but, although the foundations of the original manor house were uncovered, few other items were discovered. The complete financial records of the castle's construction, however, were found in the archives of the Hastings family by the historian Thomas Fosbrooke while he was investigating Ashby by de la Zouch castle, who passed them to Peers; they have since provided what the historian John Goodall describes as "a fascinating insight" into medieval building operations.

In the 21st century, Kirby Muxloe Castle is managed by English Heritage as a tourist attraction, receiving 2,461 visitors in 2015. Substantial restoration work was carried out in 2006, including extensive replacement of much of the brickwork. The castle is protected under UK law as a Grade I listed building, and Historic England considers it to be a "spectacular example of a late medieval quadrangular castle of the highest status". According to a 2013 report by English Heritage, almost the entire Kirby Muxloe Castle estate was at high risk of flooding.

== Architecture ==
=== Location ===
Kirby Muxloe Castle is positioned set back from the village of Kirby Muxloe on low-lying land; the castle's gardens and orchard probably stood to the north and west of the current site. John Goodall suggests that the earlier residence on the site was built around two courts, one of which survives within the later castle, with the other on the north-west side of the site. The historian Anthony Emery, however, argues that the earlier manor was similar in size and shape to the current castle: he suggests that it was fortified and was protected by a moat similar to that seen today. The foundations of the first residence discovered between 1912 and 1913 were left uncovered after the excavations and remain visible in the castle lawns.

=== Design ===
Plan of the castle. Key: A – east tower; B – south tower; C – site of earlier manor; D – north tower; E – gatehouse; F – west tower; black, dark and light grey – 1480s buildings, foundations and intended design; dark and light yellow – earlier manorial foundations and possible design

The 15th-century castle is rectangular in shape, 245 by 175 feet (75 by 53 m) across, similar in design to Farleigh Hungerford Castle in Somerset or Baconsthorpe Castle in Norfolk. Although incomplete, the surviving elements and the foundations show that it was designed with a square tower on each corner, with less substantial side towers on the north-east, south-east and south-west edges, and a large gatehouse on the north-western side. An inner range of buildings, 17 feet (5.2 m) deep, ran around the inside of the curtain wall, set back slightly from the wall itself and forming a central courtyard. The towers projected 6 feet (1.8 m) into the water-filled moat which surrounded the castle.

The moat was supplied with water from a small brook, which also fed a suite of stew ponds for the castle. Two dams were constructed to create the moat, the first to divert water from the main stream, and the second to control the water level in the moat. The current sluices are modern, but the originals were made from wood and leather. The moat, between 45 feet (14 m) and 75 feet (23 m) wide, was crossed by an oak bridge.

Only the gatehouse and the west tower still survive, partially intact. The gatehouse was originally protected by a drawbridge and a portcullis. The gatehouse was rectangular, built from brick with stone detailing, with four polygonal turrets. Had it been completed, it might have been 30 metres (98 ft) tall and have resembled the gatehouse at Layer Marney Tower. On the ground floor, two chambers, including the porter's lodge, flanked the gate passage. The first floor housed the portcullis mechanism and a garderobe. If the second floor was ever completed, it has since been lost. The west tower is 25 feet (7.6 m) across externally and 18 feet (5.5 m) internally, made of simple patterned brickwork, with three floors and two, slightly taller, turrets on the inside corners. Each floor had a single chamber, with a fireplace and an adjacent garderobe, which would have formed lodgings for senior members of the household.

The castle was primarily built from bricks, with stone used for the detailing, such as doorways. The brickwork was decorated with patterns of darker bricks, called diapering, which was used to show symbols associated with Lord Hastings, as well as objects such as a jug and a ship. This style of decorative brickwork and stonework was popular across England at this time, but particularly so at Eton College, where John Cowper, the master mason on the project, had been an apprentice. Although the castle was not extensively decorated, the brickwork at Kirby Muxloe was skillfully executed, with the bricklayers cutting and shaping the kiln-fired bricks to produce spiral and domed vaulting.

Gunports for early gunpowder artillery had begun to be installed in English castles during the 15th century. At Kirby Muxloe, six gunports were constructed in the ground floor walls of both the gatehouse and west tower; these were then temporarily filled with bricks, probably to prevent vermin and to limit the draughts. Several more gunports were built lower down in the gatehouse, presumably in error as they were ultimately below the waterline of the moat and permanently blocked up. The range of any guns at the castle would have been quite limited, as they were positioned relatively low to the ground. Historians are uncertain to what extent any guns at Kirby Muxloe would have been useful in a conflict. The gunports are of early design and may have been intended to be symbolic rather than practical; they were well positioned across the castle's defences, however, and might well have been intended to deter a serious attack.

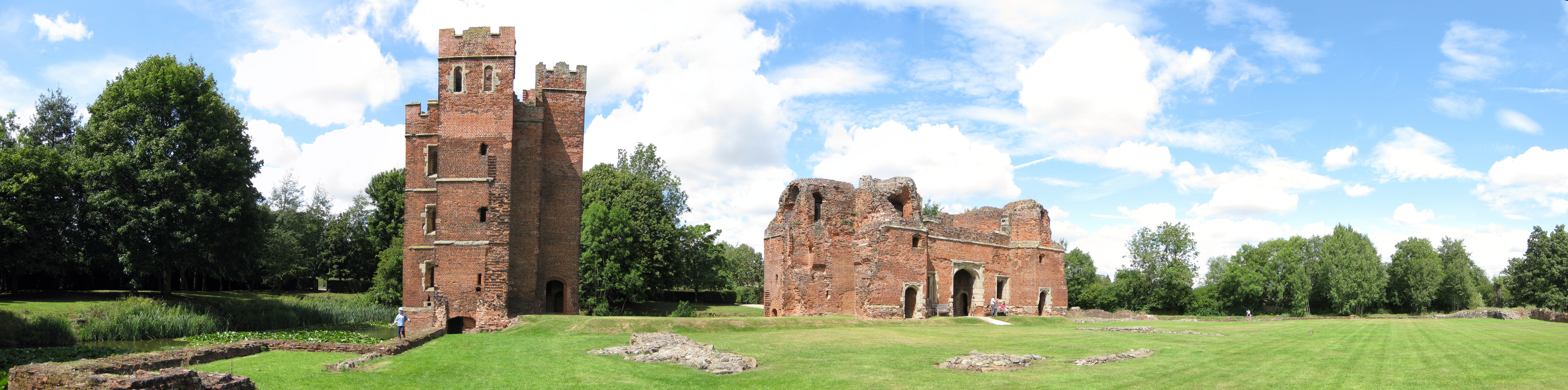
The interior of the castle, showing the west tower (left) and the gatehouse

== See also ==
- Castles in Great Britain and Ireland
- List of castles in Leicestershire

== Bibliography ==
- Anonymous (1855–1856). "Excursion September 11 1855, Meeting 29 October 1855". Transactions of the Leicestershire Archaeological and Historical Society. 1: 61–64.
- Bloxam, Andrew (1829). A Description of Bradgate Park, and the Adjacent Country. Leicester, UK: Thomas Combe and Son. OCLC 558625597 – via Google Books.
- Creighton, Oliver H. (2013) [2009]. Designs Upon the Land: Elite Landscapes of the Middle Ages. Cambridge, UK: Woodbridge Press. ISBN 978-1-84383-825-8.
- Emery, Anthony (2000). Greater Medieval Houses of England and Wales, 1300–1500, Volume 2: East Anglia, Central England and Wales. Cambridge, UK: Cambridge University Press. ISBN 978-0-521-58131-8.
- Fry, Sebastian (2014). A History of the National Heritage Collection: Volume Two: 1900–1913. London, UK: English Heritage. ISSN 2046-9799.
- Goodall, John (2011). Ashby de la Zouch Castle and Kirby Muxloe Castle (2nd ed.). London, UK: English Heritage. ISBN 978-1-84802-109-9.
- Hewitt, F.; Langham, J. (1913–1920). "Kirby Muxloe Castle". Transactions of the Leicestershire Archaeological and Historical Society. 11: 109–114. doi:10.5284/1107935.
- Liddiard, Robert (2005). Castles in Context: Power, Symbolism and Landscape, 1066 to 1500. Macclesfield, UK: Windgather Press. ISBN 0-9545575-2-2.
- Mackenzie, James D. (1896). The Castles of England: Their Story and Structure. New York, U.S.: Macmillan. OCLC 504892038.
- Pearson, Trevor (2013). English Heritage Inland Estate Flood Risk Assessment (Report). English Heritage.
- Peers, Charles Reed (1917). Kirby Muxloe Castle Near Leicester. London, UK: His Majesty's Stationery Office. OCLC 499788899.
- Pounds, Norman John Greville (1990). The Medieval Castle in England and Wales: A Social and Political History. Cambridge, UK: Cambridge University Press. ISBN 978-0-521-45828-3.
- Fosbrooke, Thomas H. (1913–1920). "A Short Description of the Original Building Accounts of Kirby Muxloe Castle". Transactions of the Leicestershire Archaeological and Historical Society. 11: 87–90. doi:10.5284/1107915.
