= Rothley Brook =

Stream in Leicestershire, England

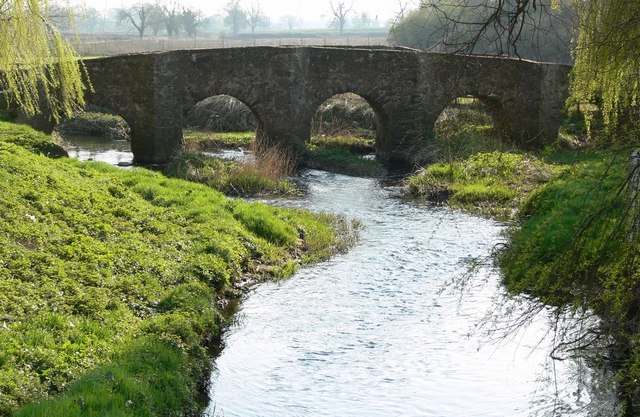
- Packhorse Bridge Anstey

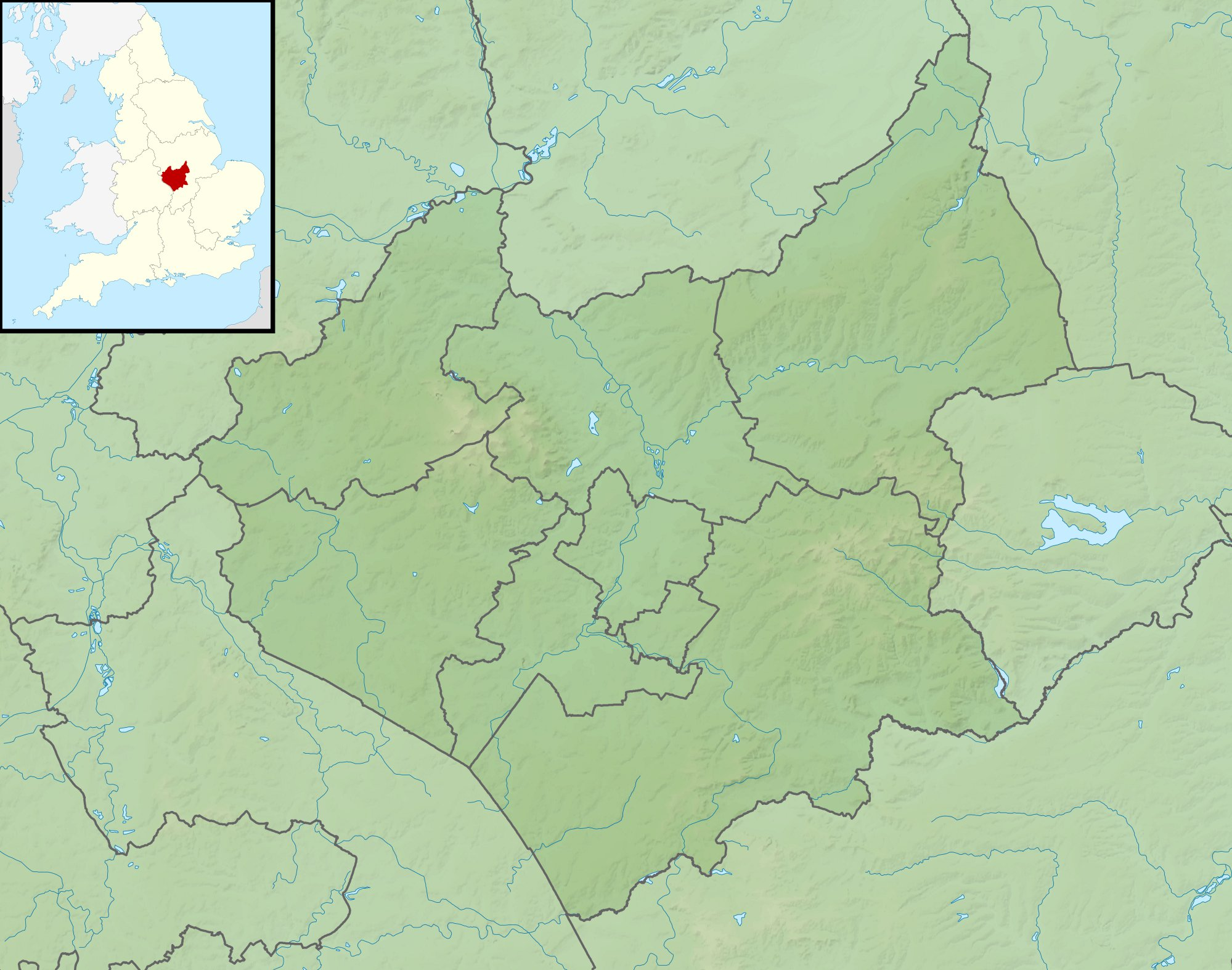
- Confluence with Soar shown in Leicestershire

Location
- Country: England
- Counties: Leicestershire

Physical characteristics
- Source: Stanton-under-Bardon
  - location: 52.688402°N 1.309083°W
  - elevation: 174 m (571 ft)
- Mouth: Rothley
  - coordinates: 52°42′5″N 1°7′26″W
- Length: 29 km (18 mi)
- Basin size: 96 km^{2} (37 sq mi)
- Discharge
  - location: Rothley
  - average: 0.73 m^{3}/s (26 cu ft/s)
- Progression : Rothley - Soar - Trent - Humber

The Rothley Brook is a left bank tributary of the River Soar in Leicestershire, England.

== Course ==
It first becomes noticeable after Thornton Reservoir, near the village of Thornton in the National Forest. It then flows through Desford and Ratby before being joined by a tributary from Kirby Muxloe just before Glenfield.

After Glenfield, it flows around Anstey, Cropston and Thurcaston before finally reaching Rothley where it joins the River Soar.

== History ==
It was previously known as "Heathe Brook".

== Castle Hill Park ==
The Rothley Brook is one of the defining features of the large Castle Hill Country Park in Anstey and runs parallel to Cropston Road and the A46 as well as passing underneath Anstey Lane, Thurcaston. The parts of the brook which flow through Castle Hill Park are a haven for wildlife, including kingfishers.
