= Brookvale High School =

Coordinates: 52.6573°N 1.2339°W

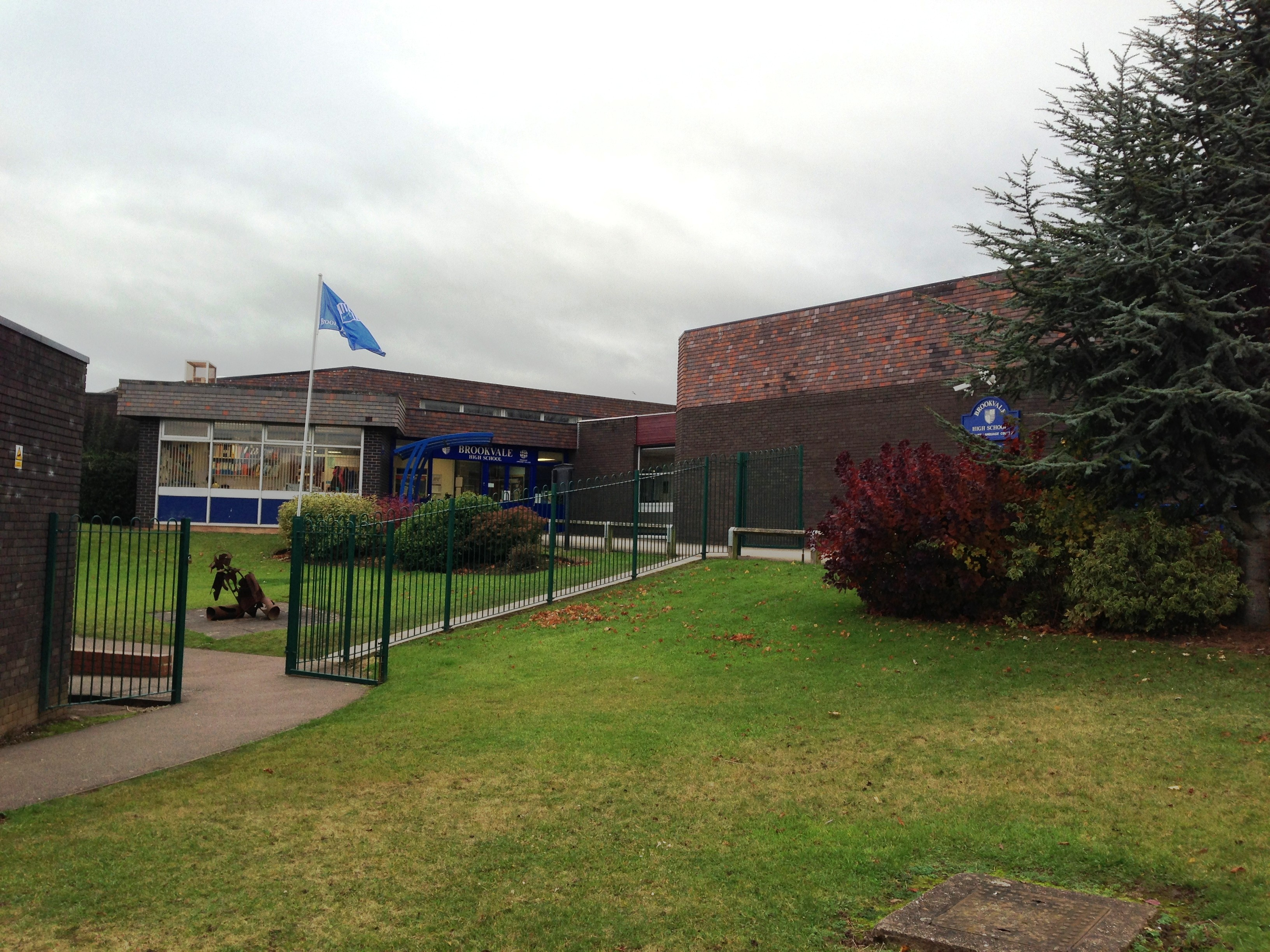

Location
- Ratby Road; Groby, Leicestershire, LE6 0FP; England

Information
- Type: Middle school
- Motto: Work hard, be kind
- Established: 1975
- Closed: 2012
- Department for Education URN: 138323 Tables
- Ofsted: Reports
- Religious head: Greg Godwin
- Gender: Coeducational
- Age: 11 to 14
- Website: http://www.brookvalehighschool.co.uk/

Brookvale High School, opened 1976, was a mixed middle school in the village of Groby in Leicestershire, England, providing education for students aged 11–14. It shared a large campus with Groby Community College which takes pupils from 14 to 19. Its main intake came from partner schools in Groby and the nearby villages of Ratby, Kirby Muxloe and Newtown Linford though it accepted other pupils subject to availability of places. Its name was derived from a small group of cottages, named Brooke Vale Cottages, that formerly occupied the site where the school was built. The school specialised in languages and taught French, Spanish and German to its pupils.

In July 2012 both Brookvale and Groby Community College jointly became an academy. In September of that year the combined school rebranded itself as Brookvale Groby Learning Campus and changed its age range to 11 to 19.

== OFSTED results ==
The school was judged outstanding by OFSTED in February 2014. The report described the school as having "a very positive environment for learning which successfully supports the excellent academic and personal development of the students". The school achieved 'outstanding' in all four areas assessed by OFSTED: achievement of pupils, quality of teaching, behaviour and safety of pupils and leadership and management.
In an article in the Leicester Mercury, head teacher Katie Rush said the whole school had shown commitment but she was particularly proud of the students.
