= Thurcaston =

Village in Leicestershire, England

Coordinates: 52.683°N 1.15°W

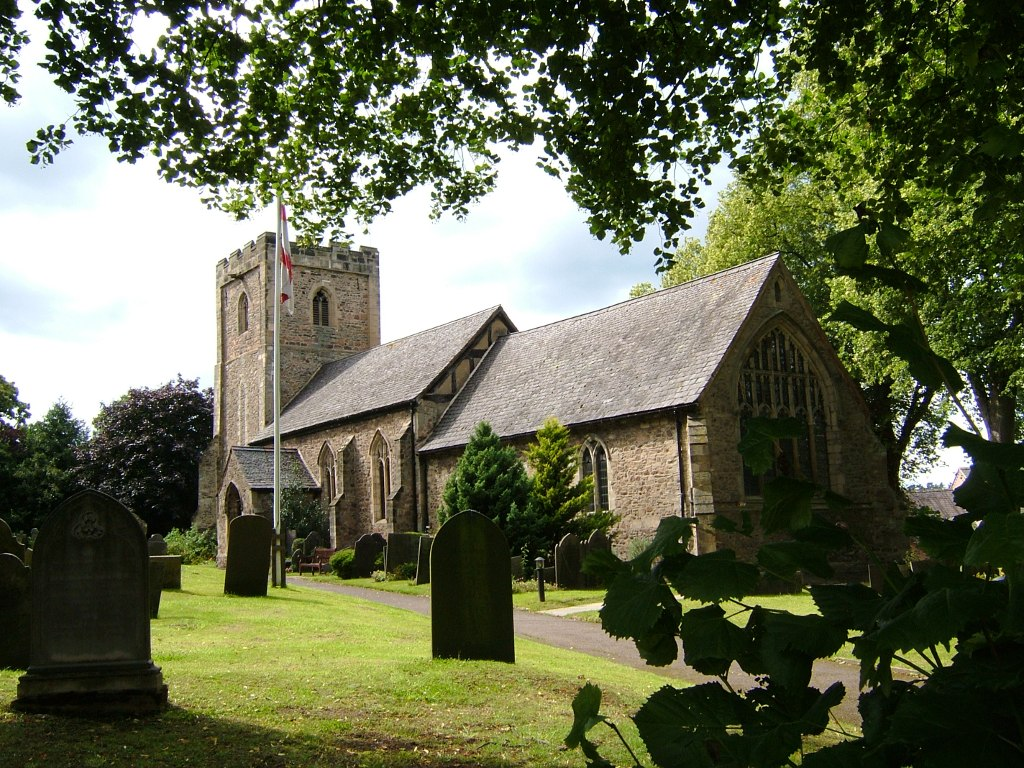
- All Saints' Church, Thurcaston

- Location within Leicestershire
- Population: 800 (estimated 2001)
- Civil parish: Thurcaston and Cropston
- District: Charnwood
- Shire county: Leicestershire
- Region: East Midlands
- Country: England
- Sovereign state: United Kingdom
- Post town: LEICESTER
- Postcode district: LE7
- Dialling code: 0116
- Police: Leicestershire
- Fire: Leicestershire
- Ambulance: East Midlands
- UK Parliament: Mid Leicestershire

Thurcaston is a village in the civil parish of Thurcaston and Cropston, in the Charnwood district, in Leicestershire, England. It was the home of Bishop Hugh Latimer.

It borders the villages of Anstey and Cropston, as well as the Leicester suburb of Beaumont Leys. The Rothley Brook flows through the village. The A46 Leicester Western Bypass runs close to the village, separating it from Leicester, Birstall, and Beaumont Leys.

The village of Thurcaston has existed since at least the 8th century AD, and includes a church and several old houses, along with a very small Methodist Chapel. In general, there are few commercial properties, but there exists a pub, The Wheatsheaf Inn, and an electrical showroom, Tebbatts Electronics. There is a single bus service, the 154 run by Centrebus at a maximum frequency of every hour. The previous service, the 55, was shut down in the late 2000s.

Large fields between the Great Central Railway line and the houses of the residents of Leicester Road form a popular place for walking dogs and horses.

A planned housing development is currently being discussed with Charnwood Borough council, upon which will see the erection of up to 50 dwellings, community centre and park, including sustainable drainage system with access off Mill Road, the large area of land is to the east off Mill Road.

== Civil parish ==
On 1 April 1935 the parish of Cropston was merged with Thurcaston, parts of Beaumont Leys was also merged, on 7 August 1989 the parish was renamed "Thurcaston & Cropston". In 1931 the parish of Thurcaston (prior to the merge) had a population of 336.

== Richard Hill Primary School ==
The village school is Richard Hill Primary School, which was founded in 1715 by Richard Hill, a resident of the village. Originally Richard Hill Primary School was located further up Anstey Lane but after expansion into the Memorial Hall in the early 1960s, it was moved further towards Leicester Road in 1968, after accepting more students from Cropston and All Saints/Hall Farm Road. It was further extended by the addition of two classrooms in 1970.

In recent years Richard Hill has had varied results in League Tables.

Thurcaston children go to The Martin High School in the neighbouring village of Anstey from the age of 11 to 16, and The Cedars Academy and Rawlins Academy for 11–18.
