= Leicester Forest East =

Village and civil parish in Leicestershire, United Kingdom

Coordinates: 52.62223°N 1.22498°W

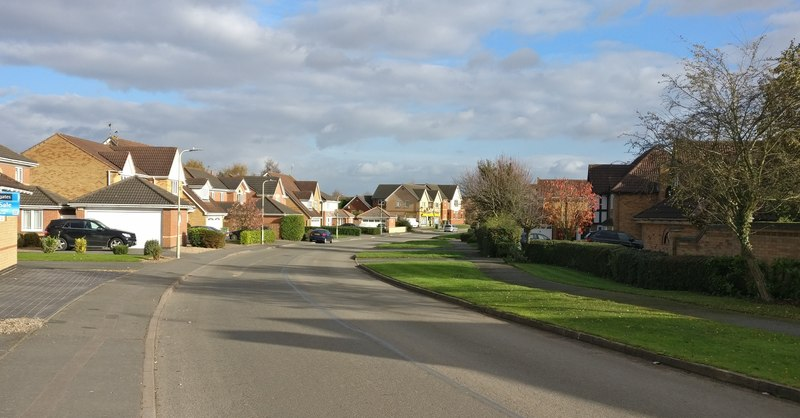
Forest House Lane

Leicester Forest East (LFE) is a large suburban village in Leicestershire, England, west of Leicester, straddling the M1 motorway. It is part of the Blaby district.

Leicester Forest East is a popular location among commuters and young families. It was developed primarily between 1920 and 1985, seeing major developments constructed along the Hinckley Road (A47) and to the south-east of the M1 throughout the 1930s. Large-scale housing developments took place in the 1960s, to the north-east and west of the M1 motorway. In the 1980s, a large housing project was constructed at the western edge of the settlement. The village takes its name from the ancient Leicester Forest. The streets through the housing developments to the north-east of the M1 take their names from Ann Packer and Robbie Brightwell, Olympic medalists in the 1964 Tokyo games.

== Amenities ==
There are local shopping facilities at the eastern end of the community, including a newsagent, a post office and a Co-op supermarket with a cash-dispenser. There are also numerous local shops along the Hinckley Road approaching the western end of the community, including a small Nisa (formerly Sainsbury’s), a chip shop, a vape shop, three hair salons and a Tesco Express Store, which is on the site of the old petrol garage at the Kirby Lane junction. The new community run Public Library is next to the Stafford Leys Primary School with the old library now being a dog-grooming saloon. There are two medical centres in Leicester Forest East, one at the eastern end housing a general practitioners, a pharmacy and a dentist, and another on the western end (Warren Lane) with similar facilities run by the same practice. There is a veterinary surgery along the Hinckley Road, next to Elliot Drive.

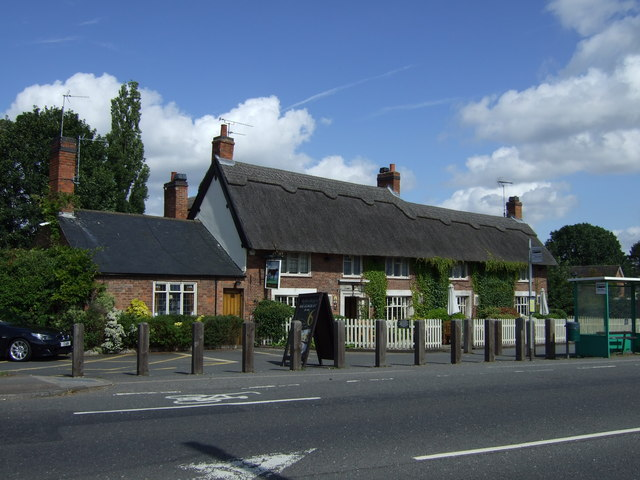
The Red Cow

There are two pubs with hotels in Leicester Forest East, both on the A47. The Forest Park Inn is a recently refurbished family motel with outdoor patio seating. The other is a much older establishment called The Red Cow (which strictly speaking is in Kirby Muxloe). Both serve food and offer accommodation.

The Parish Hall is situated on King's Drive, by the playing field/park. A new playpark was installed in early 2009. Recently the Parish Hall have played hosts to Clubszone, a local children's activity provider running in the school holidays. They also host a community cinema which is on the first Thursday evening at 7.30 of every month (except July/August).

There are three places of Christian worship – St Andrews, an ecumenical church with Anglican and Methodist congregations. Also behind the church there is a local Beavers, Cubs, Scouts Troop (92nd Leicester Forest East). There is a meeting house for Jehovahs witnesses in Hinckley Road. There is also the nearby Forest Chapel, where a playgroup and day care centre (Forest Chapel Day Care) operate.

== Transport ==
- There are bus services to Leicester, Hinckley, Nuneaton and other local destinations. Bus services are operated by Stagecoach Midlands and Arriva Midlands East. There is also a park and ride service from Meynells Gorse on the eastern edge of Leicester Forest East to the city centre. An additional service (route 51) runs from Braunstone Cross Roads into the city centre, provided by Arriva.
- Leicester Forest East does not have a railway station but provision has been made for one at Meynell's Gorse. The Leicester and Swannington Railway that runs through the area is now freight-only but it carried passengers until 1964 and could do so again if Phase two of the proposed Ivanhoe Line were to go ahead. This would connect Leicester Forest East to Ashby-de-la-Zouch, Coalville, Burton upon Trent and Leicester railway station.
- Road links are excellent, but heavily congested, with the A47 bisecting the community – running to Hinckley, Birmingham and Leicester. There is good access to the A46 road where it bypasses Leicester, and from there to the M1 and M69. Congestion on the A47 particularly in the mornings, for city bound traffic, is a major issue for commuters in Leicester Forest East, and for those using this road. Equally, there is congestion on Ratby Lane in the late afternoons for traffic leaving the A46 and M1 wishing to join the A47 from this direction.
- Facilities for cyclists are made with on-road cycle lanes having been put in along the greater part of Hinckley Road during 2009. The main routes to and from the city, and to major shopping areas are indirect and on busy roads. There are no secure cycle parking facilities at the local shops, the community centre or the churches.
- There is a reasonably well-maintained network of local footpaths giving pleasant walks towards Enderby, Thorpe Astley and Kirby Muxloe.

== Schools ==
Stafford Leys Primary School opened in 1966 under the headship of Gordon Hill (who was better known as a football league referee). The school takes pupils from reception up to year 6. The current headteacher is Mr A.Kitchen. In 2003, the Leicester Tigers star Freddie Tuilagi opened a new library building, one of the largest primary school libraries in the county. In 2006, the school achieved the National Healthy Schools Standard, for its work in educating pupils about healthy eating, exercise, emotional issues and bullying. The school has also attained the Basic Skills and Investors in People awards. In its May 2006 inspection, Ofsted assessed the school as Satisfactory, point 3 on a four-point scale, saying "This is a satisfactory school, which has improved well since the last inspection, when it was judged to have serious weaknesses.". The Ofsted inspection in June 2009 assessed the school as 'Good' and identified a number of aspects which were outstanding.

Secondary education will typically continue at South Charnwood High School in Markfield.

Holmfield Primary School, on the eastern boundary of Leicester Forest East, was closed permanently by Leicestershire County Council on 16 July 2010.

A new £4m school was built on the former site of Holmfield Primary School. Fossebrook Primary School opened for its first intake in September 2016, it provides primary years education to pupils living in Leicester Forest East and Braunstone Town. The school opened with 210 places, with the potential to expand as demand increases. The Discovery Schools Academy Trust has been selected to sponsor the school. The school has extensive parking for staff, parents, visitors and local residents.

== Motorway service area ==
Most people know Leicester Forest East for the Leicester Forest East motorway service station on the M1 motorway, which opened on 14 February 1966 just over a year after the motorway reached Markfield. It was based on an Italian design used on the autostrade which is very unusual in Britain. At the time of opening it was operated by the Ross Group and featured a Terence Conran designed restaurant with a waitress silver service restaurant. There is no legal access for public vehicles to the motorway from within Leicester Forest East (although some members of the public use the slip-road which is properly reserved for service station employees and emergency vehicles as a means of getting on and off the M1).

There are long term plans to widen the M1 motorway, which if given the go-ahead would have transformed the stretch of the M1 that bisects Leicester Forest East from the current eight lanes to ten lanes. Many local residents have campaigned against such schemes. Any developments would result in the closure of Leicester Forest East service station.
