= Cropston =

Village in Leicestershire, England

Coordinates: 52.69°N 1.18°W

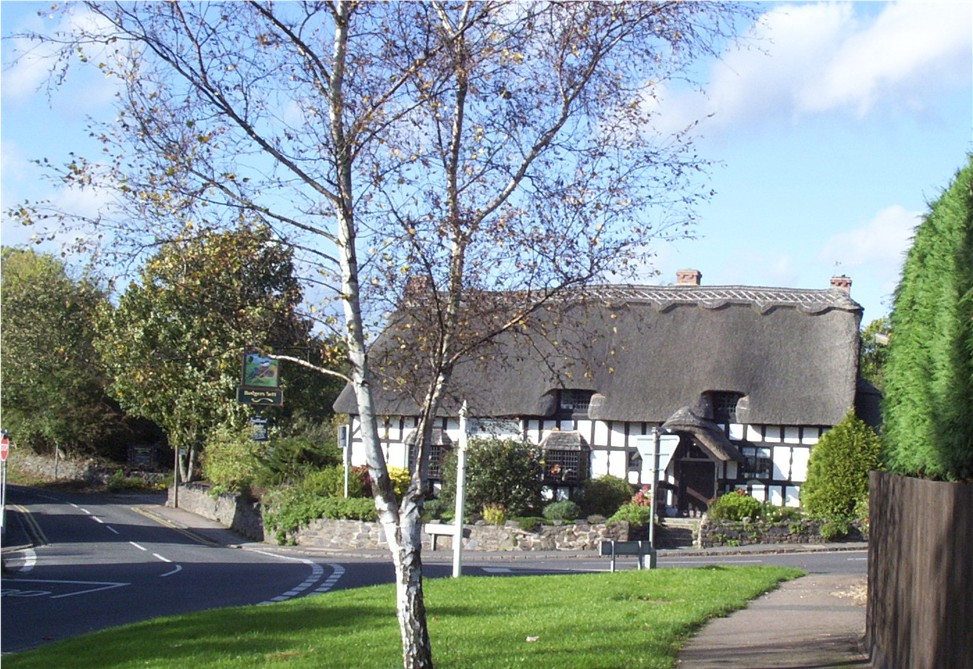
- Cropston

- Location within Leicestershire
- Civil parish: Thurcaston and Cropston
- District: Charnwood
- Shire county: Leicestershire
- Region: East Midlands
- Country: England
- Sovereign state: United Kingdom
- Post town: Leicester
- Postcode district: LE7
- Dialling code: 0116
- Police: Leicestershire
- Fire: Leicestershire
- Ambulance: East Midlands
- UK Parliament: Mid Leicestershire

Cropston is a village and former civil parish, now in the parish of Thurcaston and Cropston, part of the Borough of Charnwood in Leicestershire, England. It is on the edge of Charnwood Forest, and lies close to Bradgate Park. In 1931 the parish had a population of 404.

The village itself is small, with the older properties close to the crossroads of Reservoir and Station Roads. Near the crossroads there are two pubs, The Bradgate Arms and The Badger's Sett (formerly The Reservoir Inn), and a garage. There are a number of cottages dating back to the 16th century. Cropston Reservoir lies between the village and Bradgate Park. The Victorian pumping station next to the reservoir has now been replaced with a more modern facility.

Cropston Cricket Club hold regular fixtures at their Waterfield Road cricket field.

The Rothley Brook flows between Cropston and Thurcaston, and other nearby villages include Rothley, Anstey, Swithland and Newtown Linford.

== History ==
The village's name means 'farm/settlement of Kroppr/Croppa'.

Cropston was formerly a township in Thurcaston parish, from 1866 Cropston was a civil parish in its own right until it was abolished on 1 April 1935 and merged with Thurcaston.
