= Glenfield, Leicestershire =

Village in Leicestershire, England

Coordinates: 52.64907°N 1.20622°W

Glenfield
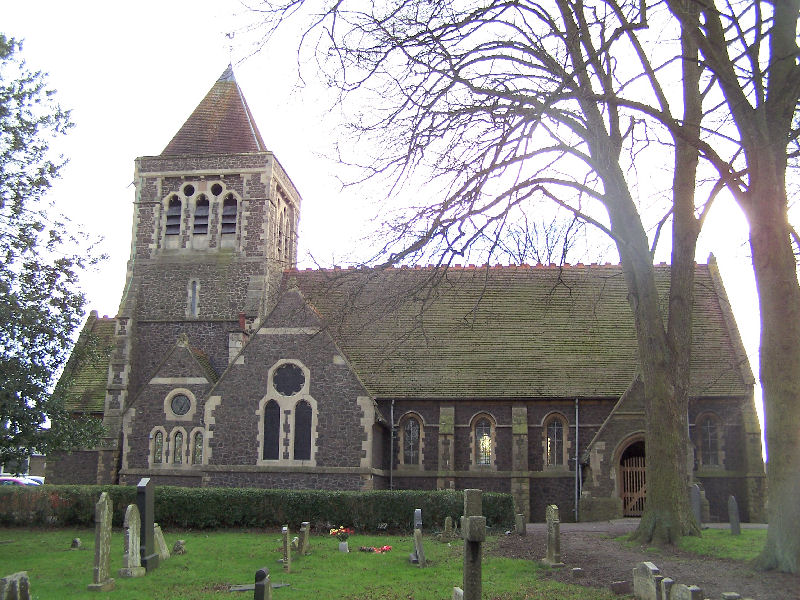
- St Peter's Church, Glenfield

- Location within Leicestershire
- Population: 9,643 (parish; 2011 Census)
- OS grid reference: SK538060
- Civil parish: Glenfields
- District: Blaby
- Shire county: Leicestershire
- Region: East Midlands
- Country: England
- Sovereign state: United Kingdom
- Post town: LEICESTER
- Postcode district: LE3
- Dialling code: 0116
- Police: Leicestershire
- Fire: Leicestershire
- Ambulance: East Midlands
- UK Parliament: Mid Leicestershire

Glenfield is a large village and former civil parish, now in the parish of Glenfields, in the Blaby district of Leicestershire, England. At the 2011 Census, Glenfields had a population of 9,643. The village lies 3 miles (5 km) directly to the west of Leicester and just off junction 21A of the M1. It is the site of the headquarters of Leicestershire County Council and of Leicestershire Fire and Rescue Service. It also gives its name to Glenfield Hospital, although it lies across the city border in Leicester.

== History ==
The name Glenfield means "clean field", possibly suggesting that it was clear of weeds.

Glenfield is mentioned in the Domesday Book of 1086, at which time it lay in Guthlaxton hundred and contained 12 households.

The village was greatly enlarged between the 1920s and the 1950s, when the Faire Estate was built. In the 1980s and 1990s, another large estate was built on former farmland behind Ellis Park.

Glenfield was the site of the first station from Leicester West Bridge on the Leicester and Swannington Railway, opened on 17 July 1832 as the world's third steam railway. Just before reaching the station, the line passed through Glenfield Tunnel, which was built by Robert Stephenson and was, at 1 mile 36 yards, the world's longest railway tunnel at the time. The Glenfield end of the tunnel can still be seen.

In 1931, the parish had a population of 1,590. On 1 April 1935, the parish was abolished to form "Glenfields".

== Amenities ==
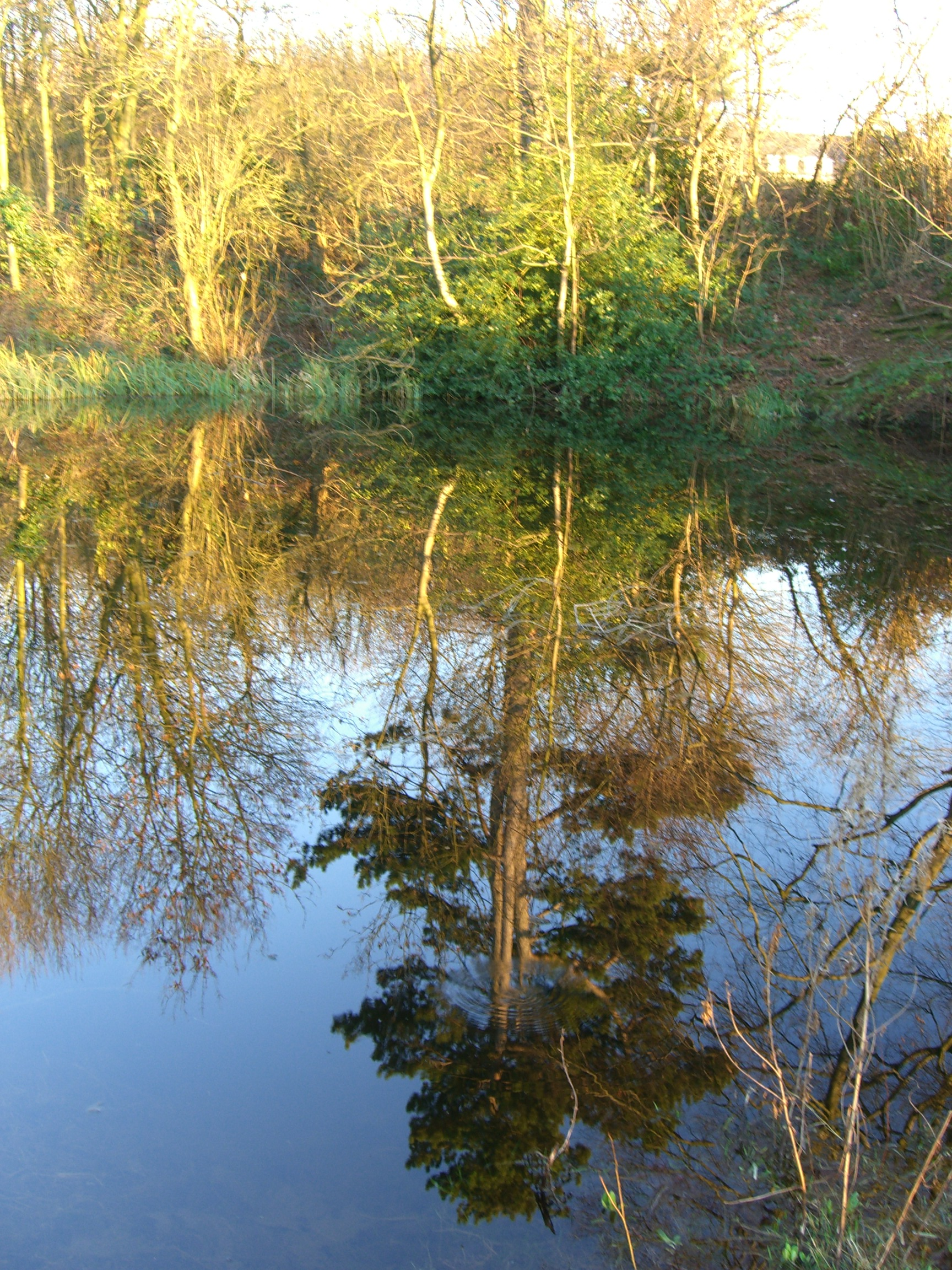
Pond at Gynsills Nature Reserve

The heart of the community is around the Square, with St Peter's Church (CofE), the church hall, the ruins of the former church, the Methodist Church and Hall and the public library just inside Station Road, and Park House (parish council), the Memorial Hall, Scout Hut, playground, Glenfield Primary School and the nursery school all located just inside Stamford Street. The Hall County Primary School is located on Glenfield Frith Drive. Situated close to the Hall school is Faire Road, commonly known for the row of shops situated there.

Glenfield has its own village newspaper, The Glenfield Gazette. The parish council owns several areas of recreational land, including Ellis Park, Station Park and the Playing Fields. Near to the A50 and the boundary with Groby is the "Millennium Green", which is managed by a local trust. The Gynsills Nature Area can be found at the junction of Gynsill Lane and Stelle Way. A small area of mature trees and a pond, once part of the Gynsills Estate parkland, is now an area promoting biodiversity and nature conservation.

The area known as "The Square" was once more of a road and contained many more shops, mostly owned by the Stockley family. These were demolished in the 1950s and 1960s to accommodate the roundabout and the maisonettes were built in place of the grocers, post office and butcher's shop.

== Economy ==
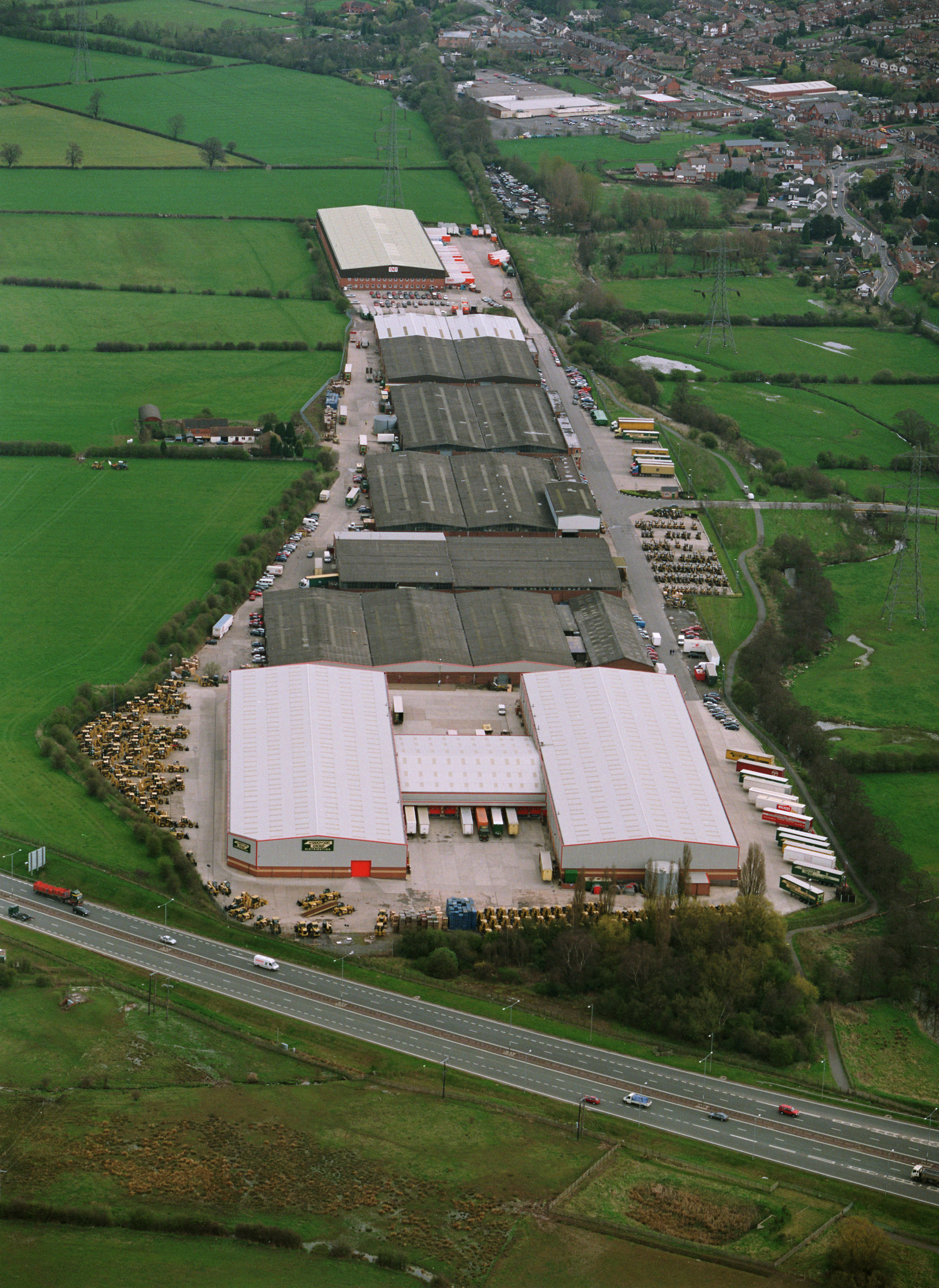
The Mill Lane Industrial Estate

Although Glenfield is mainly residential there are a few businesses located in the area, notably the Widdowson Group and others located on the Mill Lane Industrial Estate.

== Transport ==
Glenfield served the village between 1832 and 1928. The nearest railway station is now at Leicester; from here, East Midlands Railway operates services on the Midland Main Line to London St Pancras, Sheffield and Nottingham.

The M1 can be accessed easily at junction 21A to the south of the village (southbound only), which makes Fosse Shopping Park accessible. The M1 North can be reached in minutes along the A50 towards Markfield, Groby and Coalville.

The A46 leads around the north of Leicester, with access to Anstey and then the A6 to Loughborough.

Glenfield is served by bus routes operated by First Leicester and Arriva Midlands, which connect the village with Leicester, Ashby, Coalville, Ratby and Swadlincote.

== Notable residents ==
- The Australian pioneer and explorer Charles Throsby was born in Glenfield in 1777
- Stamford Street was the home of painter Bryan Organ
- Salcombe Drive was the home of the pundit Graham Barnfield
- Leicester Road was the home of Alderman Bertram Powell, Lord Mayor of Leicester 1959–60, from the late 1930s to his death in 1969
- During the late 1990s Leicester City players Robbie Savage and Pontus Kåmark lived in Glenfield
- Dramatist and playwright David Campton was a resident of Liberty Road, Glenfield up until his death in 2006
- Footballers David Nugent and Chris Wood lived in Glenfield when playing for Leicester in the mid-2010s.
