= Kirby Muxloe =

Village in Leicestershire, England

Coordinates: 52.6351°N 1.2341°W

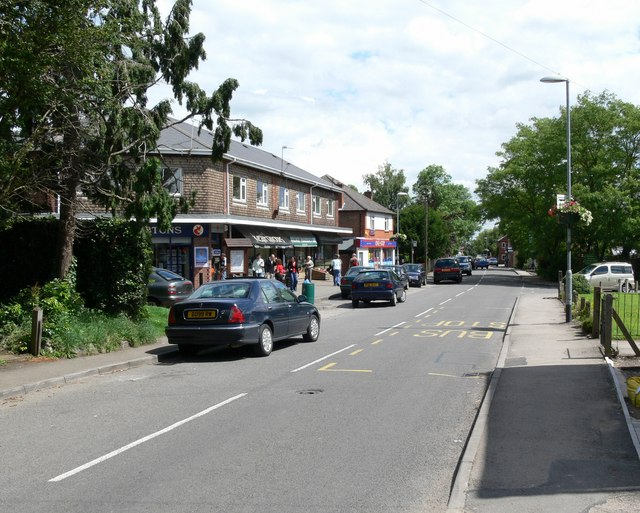
- Main Street, Kirby Muxloe

- Location within Leicestershire
- Population: 4,667 (2011)
- OS grid reference: SK519044
- District: Blaby
- Shire county: Leicestershire
- Region: East Midlands
- Country: England
- Sovereign state: United Kingdom
- Post town: LEICESTER
- Postcode district: LE9
- Dialling code: 0116
- UK Parliament: Mid Leicestershire
- Website: http://kirbymuxloe.net/

Kirby Muxloe is a large village and civil parish in the Blaby district of Leicestershire, England, west of Leicester. It is in the Leicester Urban Area. The Leicester Forest East parish border runs along the Hinckley Road (A47). At the 2011 census, it had a population of 4,667.

== History ==
The name "Kirby" comes from the Dane Caeri who established the community here in the late ninth or early tenth century. The settlement was known as Carbi, and then later Kirby. The village was recorded in the Domesday Book as 'Carbi'. (Caeri's settlement) with a working population of 8. At the time the land in Kirby Muxloe was owned by Hugh de Grandesmaynel and by William Peverel. In 1461, William Hastings, the 1st Baron Hastings of Hungerford, became the Steward of the Honor of Leicester and Ranger of Leicester Forest. His father, Sir Leonard Hastings, had owned a modest estate in Leicestershire and Gloucestershire, where the family had long been established. On 14 April 1474 Hastings acquired the manorial right to Kirby from the Pakeman family, although he had rented it for some years previous to this. In 1480 he began to build the moated Kirby Muxloe Castle during the period of the Wars of the Roses. However, work on the castle stopped soon after Lord Hastings was executed on 13 June 1483 on the orders of Richard, Duke of Gloucester (days later to become King Richard III) at the Tower of London for conspiracy. William was caught up in the rivalry for the throne after the death of Edward IV.

In 1582 the name of the village is recorded as Kirby Muckelby. About 50 years later in 1628 disafforestation of Leicester Forest occurred, effectively dividing the land near Kirby Muxloe into forest and pasture. The results are visible today. In 1636, the Hastings families sold the castle, and estates in Kirby and Braunstone, to the Winstanley family. The first official use of Kirby Muxloe was in 1703 in the Oxford Dictionary of Placenames, which states that 'Muxloe' is a family name. There was such a family but they lived three miles away, in the village of Desford.

An early Quaker, John Penford, was a substantial resident of Kirby Muxloe and member of the Leicester Quarterly Meeting. A business meeting of the Society held at his home to consult on works of charity in 1670 was interrupted by informers, with the result that Penford and others were heavily fined.

The railway came to Kirby Muxloe in 1848 when the Midland Railway built a line through Kirby, and on 1 July 1859 Kirby Muxloe railway station opened at Kirby fields. (The station closed on 7 September 1964 as part of the Beeching cuts). In 1882, the fields known as Far and Near Townsend Close were bought by Kirby Muxloe Land Society. Barwell Road, Castle Road, and Church Road were laid out for the village and building went on over the next 30 years.

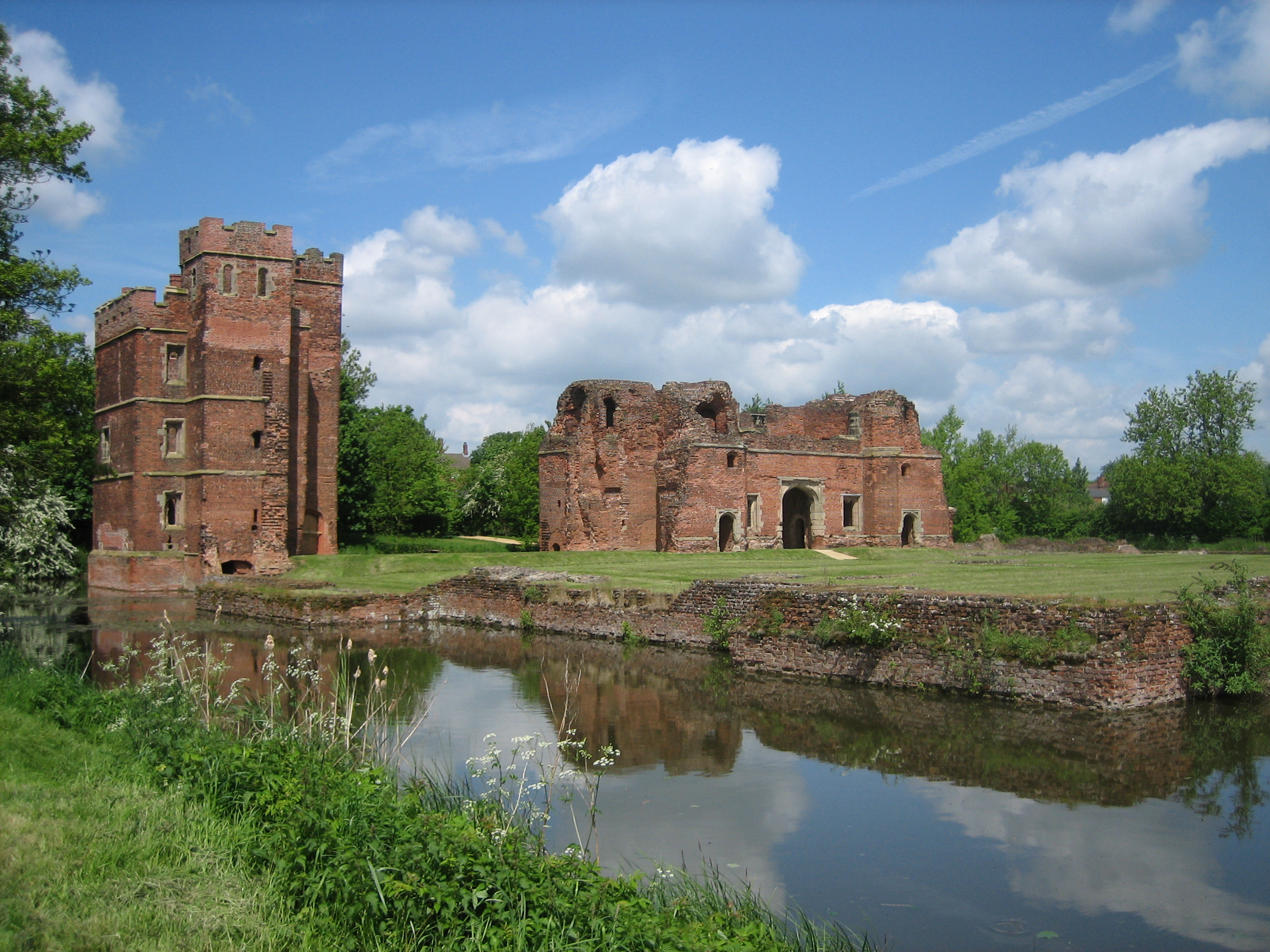
Kirby Muxloe Castle

In 1911, Kirby Muxloe Castle was handed over to the Office of Works. It is now in the care of English Heritage. In 1941, during World War II, the village was heavily bombed. A German bomber returning from an attack on Coventry emptied its load on two streets, destroying the Free Church and several houses. Gaps left in the houses can still be seen.

The village has a primary school which is rated as one of the top schools in the county. There is a chemist, bakery, supermarket, two pubs, a popular sports and social club and a golf club.

Many people who lived there during the late 20th century were born in either a small maternity home in Station Road, near Barwell Road or Roundhill Maternity Home (NHS) in Hastings Road, Kirby Fields. Both are now private residences, as they were before they became Maternity Homes. What was the nurses' home at the entrance to Roundhill is now also a private residence.

=== Second World War ===
On 19 November 1940, two parachute mines and 12 high explosive bombs were dropped, with 46 houses demolished, but no one was killed, although many people were injured.

== Places of interest ==
Sports clubs/leisure:

- Kirby Muxloe S.C.
- Kirby Muxloe Cricket Club
- Kirby Muxloe Bowls Club

== Notable former residents ==
- Alison King, actress
- Alfie Dibrowa, musician
- Actress Julie Hallam, née Smith, of 'Whiteoaks' on Forest Drive; she married actor Jeremy Irons on Sunday June 28 1970 at the parish church; she attended Market Bosworth Grammar School
