= Grade II* listed buildings in Charnwood (borough) =

There are over 20,000 Grade II* listed buildings in England. This page is a list of these buildings in Charnwood.

== Charnwood ==
Name	Location	Type	Completed (Note: The date given is the date used by Historic England as significant for the initial building or that of an important part in the structure's description.)	Date designated	Grid ref. (Note: Sometimes known as OSGB36, the grid reference is based on the British national grid reference system used by the Ordnance Survey.) Geo-coordinates	Entry number (Note: The "List Entry Number" is a unique number assigned to each listed building and scheduled monument by Historic England.)	Image
Pack Horse Bridge	The Leys, Anstey, Charnwood	Packhorse Bridge	C16/C17	1 June 1966	SK5518508448; 52°40′15″N 1°11′07″W	1177116	Pack Horse Bridge More images
Barkby Grange Farmhouse	Barkby, Charnwood	Farmhouse	1855	30 November 1977	SK6467909275; 52°40′38″N 1°02′41″W	1074495	Barkby Grange Farmhouse More images
Church of the Holy Trinity	Barrow upon Soar, Charnwood	Parish Church	Medieval	1 June 1966	SK5764617577; 52°45′10″N 1°08′50″W	1074589	Church of the Holy Trinity More images
Church of All Saints	Beeby, Charnwood	Parish Church	Late 13th century	1 June 1966	SK6640708321; 52°40′07″N 1°01′10″W	1177337	Church of All Saints More images
Church of All Saints	Cossington, Charnwood	Church	13th century	1 June 1966	SK6036413664; 52°43′02″N 1°06′28″W	1228032	Church of All Saints More images
The Old Rectory	Cossington, Charnwood	House	16th century	2 July 1951	SK6034413621; 52°43′01″N 1°06′29″W	1228038	Upload Photo
Church of St Peter and St Paul	Hathern, Charnwood	Church	14th century	15 March 1965	SK5027022428; 52°47′49″N 1°15′21″W	1320287	Church of St Peter and St Paul More images
The Village Cross	Hathern, Charnwood	Village Cross	Medieval	15 March 1965	SK5028822343; 52°47′47″N 1°15′20″W	1361141	The Village Cross More images
Church of St Peter	Mountsorrel, Charnwood	Church	14th century	1 June 1966	SK5811615106; 52°43′50″N 1°08′27″W	1228111	Church of St Peter More images
The Market Cross	Mountsorrel, Charnwood	Market Cross	1793	1 June 1966	SK5817915051; 52°43′48″N 1°08′24″W	1287313	The Market Cross More images
2, Loughborough Road	Mountsorrel, Charnwood	House	1788	12 October 1984	SK5813015131; 52°43′51″N 1°08′26″W	1228109	Upload Photo
Bradgate House and chapel	Bradgate Park, Newtown Linford, Charnwood	Country House	Begun c1490	1 June 1966	SK5342610174; 52°41′12″N 1°12′40″W	1074677	Bradgate House and chapel More images
Church of All Saints	Newtown Linford, Charnwood	Church	C14/15	1 June 1966	SK5220709782; 52°41′00″N 1°13′45″W	1074679	Church of All Saints More images
Garden Wall	Bradgate Park, Newtown Linford, Charnwood	Garden Wall	Early 16th century	1 June 1966	SK5349210161; 52°41′11″N 1°12′36″W	1361080	Upload Photo
Church of St Andrew	Prestwold Hall, Prestwold, Charnwood	Parish Church	Late 14th century	1 June 1966	SK5778221444; 52°47′15″N 1°08′41″W	1074561	Church of St Andrew More images
The Old Hall	Queniborough, Charnwood	House	1675-6	1 June 1966	SK6474612395; 52°42′19″N 1°02′36″W	1074513	Upload Photo
Church of St Botolph	Ratcliffe on the Wreake, Charnwood	Church	14th century	1 June 1966	SK6304614534; 52°43′29″N 1°04′05″W	1278781	Church of St Botolph More images
Church of St Michael and All Saints	Rearsby, Charnwood	Parish Church	Late 13th century to early 14th century	1 June 1966	SK6511114638; 52°43′32″N 1°02′14″W	1307375	Church of St Michael and All Saints More images
Old Hall	Rearsby, Charnwood	House	Late 19th century	1 June 1966	SK6500814299; 52°43′21″N 1°02′20″W	1361185	Old Hall More images
Church of St Mary the Virgin and St John the Baptist	Rothley, Charnwood	Church	13th century	1 June 1966	SK5859512654; 52°42′30″N 1°08′03″W	1230285	Church of St Mary the Virgin and St John the Baptist More images
Church of All Saints	Seagrave, Charnwood	Church	13th century	1 June 1966	SK6199217586; 52°45′08″N 1°04′59″W	1230528	Church of All Saints More images
Church of St Mary	Sileby, Charnwood	Church	13th century	1 June 1966	SK6005115174; 52°43′51″N 1°06′44″W	1230687	Church of St Mary More images
Church of St John the Baptist	South Croxton, Charnwood	Parish Church	14th century	1 June 1966	SK6917710328; 52°41′10″N 0°58′41″W	1361188	Church of St John the Baptist More images
Church of St Leonard	Swithland, Charnwood	Church	13th century and Later	1 June 1966	SK5549412826; 52°42′37″N 1°10′48″W	1177875	Church of St Leonard More images
Danvers Tomb at Church of St Leonard	Swithland, Charnwood	Table Tomb	1745	1 June 1966	SK5552312834; 52°42′37″N 1°10′47″W	1361113	Upload Photo
Church of Holy Trinity	Thrussington, Charnwood	Church	13th century	1 June 1966	SK6503615779; 52°44′09″N 1°02′18″W	1230701	Church of Holy Trinity More images
Church of All Saints	Thurcaston and Cropston, Charnwood	Church	12th century	1 June 1966	SK5653610680; 52°41′27″N 1°09′54″W	1074627	Church of All Saints More images
Latimer's House	Thurcaston and Cropston, Charnwood	House	C15/C16	9 July 1951	SK5666510851; 52°41′33″N 1°09′47″W	1074625	Latimer's House
Church of St Michael	Thurmaston, Charnwood	Parish Church	c. 1300	1 June 1966	SK6103109359; 52°40′43″N 1°05′55″W	1307276	Church of St Michael More images
Stoneywell Cottage	Ulverscroft, Charnwood	House	1899	1 June 1966	SK4978711788; 52°42′05″N 1°15′53″W	1361102	Stoneywell Cottage More images
Beaumanor Hall	Woodhouse, Charnwood	House	13th century	21 March 1972	SK5377915685; 52°44′10″N 1°12′18″W	1361103	Beaumanor Hall More images
Church of St Mary in the Elms	Woodhouse, Charnwood	Church	15th century	1 June 1966	SK5385015150; 52°43′53″N 1°12′14″W	1074611	Church of St Mary in the Elms More images
Church of St Paul	Woodhouse Eaves, Charnwood	Church	1837	15 March 1984	SK5316714080; 52°43′18″N 1°12′51″W	1074609	Church of St Paul More images
Stables, Clock Tower and Outhouses at Beaumanor Hall	Beaumanor Park, Woodhouse, Charnwood	Wall	1842-1854	15 March 1984	SK5378215798; 52°44′14″N 1°12′18″W	1074641	Stables, Clock Tower and Outhouses at Beaumanor Hall
Terrace Walls, Urns, Fountain and Seat at Beaumanor Hall	Beaumanor Park, Woodhouse, Charnwood	Garden Wall	Mid 19th century	15 March 1984	SK5377115583; 52°44′07″N 1°12′18″W	1180207	Upload Photo
Garendon Park, the Temple of Venus	Loughborough, Charnwood	Statue	1730s	15 March 1965	SK4979019057; 52°46′01″N 1°15′49″W	1116109	Garendon Park, the Temple of Venus More images
Taylor's Bell Foundry (that Part on East Side of Cobden Street)	Loughborough, Charnwood	Bell Foundry	c. 1874	24 December 1985	SK5414519810; 52°46′23″N 1°11′56″W	1236293	Taylor's Bell Foundry (that Part on East Side of Cobden Street) More images
Taylor's Bell Foundry (that Part on West Side of Cobden Street)	Loughborough, Charnwood	Carpenters Workshop	1859	24 December 1985	SK5414019825; 52°46′24″N 1°11′56″W	1264685	Taylor's Bell Foundry (that Part on West Side of Cobden Street) More images
The Old Rectory	Loughborough, Charnwood	Cross Passage House	16th century	15 March 1965	SK5375819984; 52°46′29″N 1°12′16″W	1320404	The Old Rectory More images
