= Sileby Primitive Methodist Church =

Primitive Methodist Church, Sileby
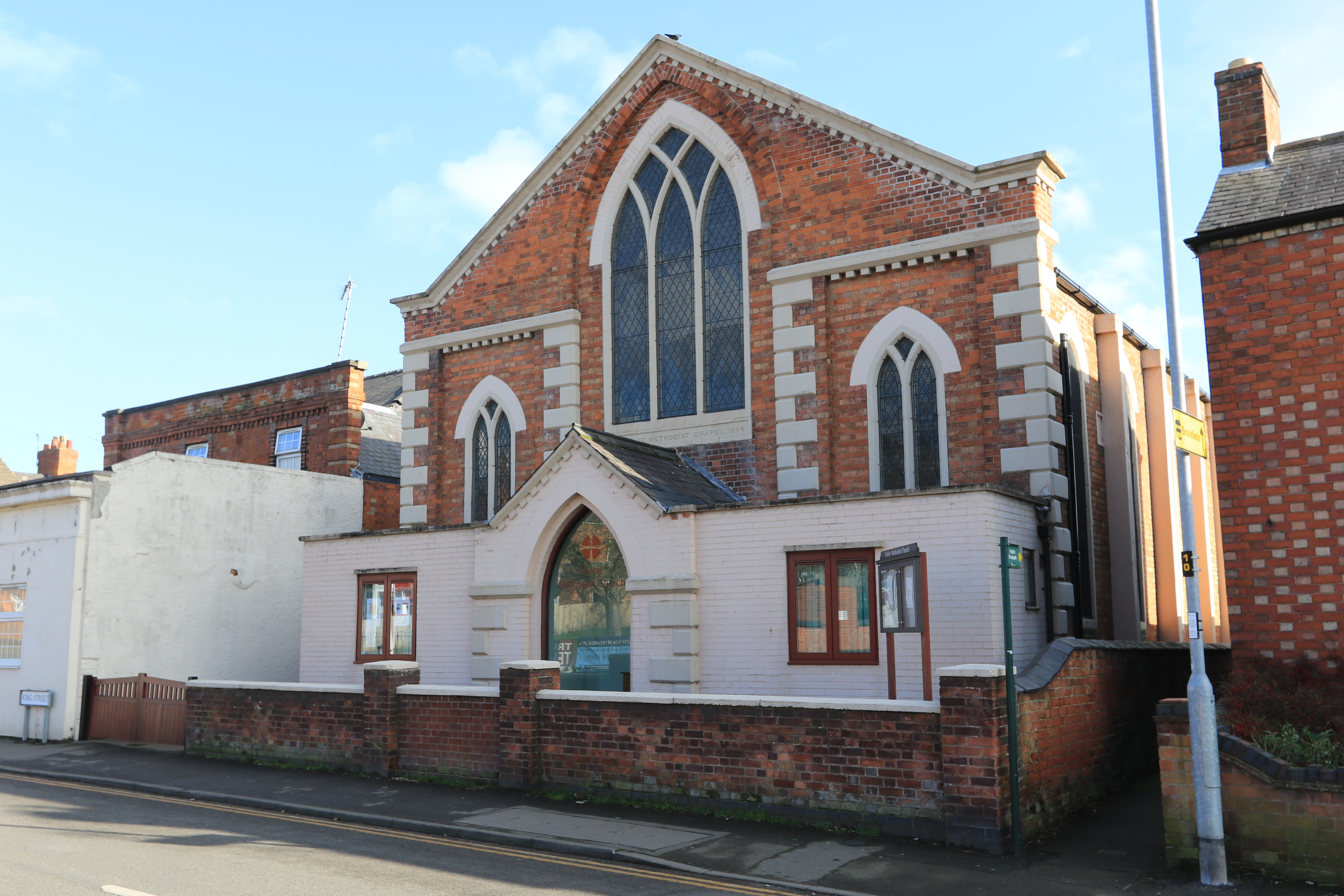
- Primitive Methodist Church, Sileby

- Location within Leicestershire
- 52°43′58.2″N 1°6′29.3″W
- OS grid reference: SK 60319 15392
- Location: Sileby
- Country: England
- Denomination: Primitive Methodist

Architecture
- Architect: James Kerridge
- Groundbreaking: 1866
- Completed: 12 May 1867

Sileby Primitive Methodist Church is a Methodist church in Sileby, Leicestershire.

== History ==
The first chapel built by the Primitive Methodists was opened by 1818. This was soon outgrown and a new church was opened on King Street in 1834.

The current church was designed by the architect James Kerridge. Construction started in 1866 and the building opened for worship on 12 May 1867

In 1931 the school room was built on Swan Street. In 1969, Sileby Wesleyan Methodist Church closed and the congregation joined the congregation at King Street.

The church underwent redevelopment in 2010.

== Organ ==
A pipe organ by Hardy and Son of Stockport was installed and opened on 22 February 1900 by James Dann, Assistant Organist at Peterborough Cathedral. The organ is no longer present
