= William Squires =

English cricketer

Personal information
- Full name: William Squires
- Born: 20 March 1796; Beeby, Leicestershire
- Died: Unknown

Domestic team information
- Years: Team
- 1823–1839: Leicester Cricket Club
- 1826: Sheffield and Leicester
- Source: CricketArchive, 23 June 2013

William Squires (born 20 March 1796) was an English cricketer who was recorded in one match in 1826 when he played for a combined Sheffield and Leicester team, scoring 0 runs in his only innings and holding no catches. Squires played for Leicester Cricket Club from 1823 to 1839.

== Bibliography ==
- Haygarth, Arthur (1996) [1862]. Scores & Biographies, Volume 1 (1744–1826). Kennington: Frederick Lillywhite. ISBN 978-19-00592-23-9.
- Haygarth, Arthur (1997) [1862]. Scores & Biographies, Volume 2 (1827–1840). Kennington: Frederick Lillywhite. ISBN 978-19-00592-23-9.
