= Barkby Thorpe =

Hamlet in Leicestershire, England

Coordinates: 52.676°N 1.062°W

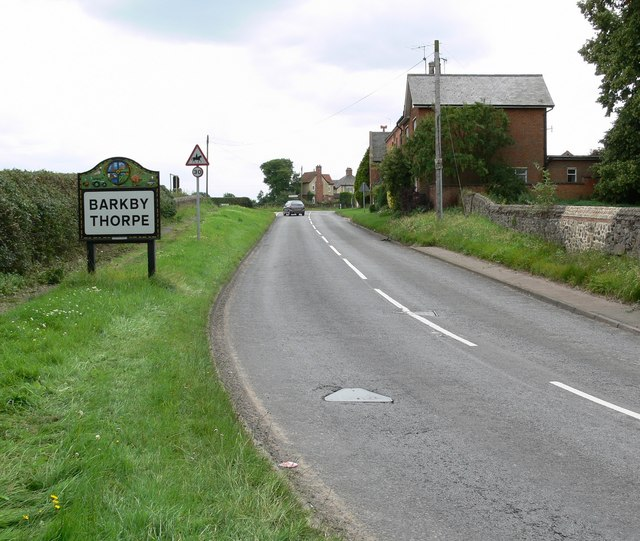

- Location within Leicestershire
- Population: 50
- Civil parish: Barkby Thorpe
- District: Charnwood
- Shire county: Leicestershire
- Region: East Midlands
- Country: England
- Sovereign state: United Kingdom
- Post town: Leicester
- Postcode district: LE7
- Police: Leicestershire
- Fire: Leicestershire
- Ambulance: East Midlands
- UK Parliament: Melton and Syston

Barkby Thorpe is a hamlet and civil parish in the Charnwood district of Leicestershire, England. The hamlet has a population of around 50, and is close to the Leicester urban sprawl in Thurmaston. Nearby villages are Barkby, Beeby, Hamilton, Hamilton Lea and the abandoned village of Hamilton.

The name Barkby has an Old Norse origin meaning "Barki's farm/settlement".
