= Sileby Wesleyan Methodist Church =

Wesleyan Methodist Church, Sileby
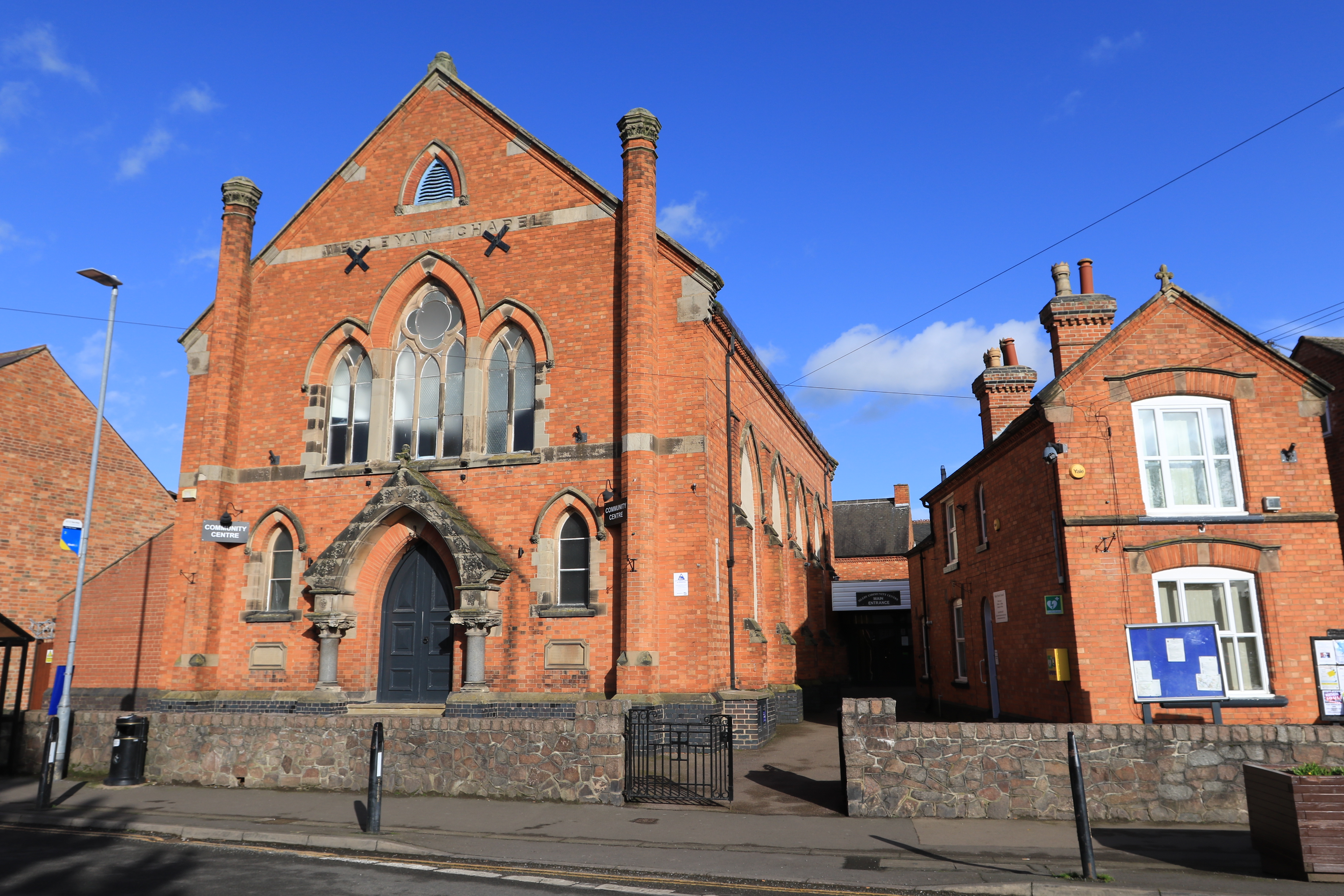
- Wesleyan Methodist Church, Sileby

- Location within Leicestershire
- 52°43′48.7″N 1°6′37.3″W
- OS grid reference: SK 60173 15097
- Location: Sileby
- Country: England
- Denomination: Wesleyan Methodist

Architecture
- Completed: 3 December 1884

Specifications
- Capacity: 350 persons

Sileby Wesleyan Methodist Church is a former Methodist church in Sileby, Leicestershire.

== History ==
Methodism in Sileby started around 1791 when a cottage was purchased for around £70 and converted into a chapel. In 1881 the congregation was in need of a new building. This was erected in High Street at a cost of £2,000 (equivalent to £173,000 in 2025) and presented to the Wesleyan Methodist Connexion at Sileby by Thomas Caloe of Mill Villa on 3 December 1884.

In 1969, the congregation decided to close the church and moved to join Sileby Primitive Methodist Church on King Street.

== Organ ==
A pipe organ by Taylor of Leicester was installed in 1885. On closure of the chapel, the organ was moved to All Saints’ Church, Cossington and then in 2012 exported to Italy.
