= Hamilton Lea =

Village in Leicestershire, England

- Location within Leicestershire
- Population: 1,168
- Civil parish: Hamilton Lea
- District: Charnwood
- Shire county: Leicestershire
- Region: East Midlands
- Country: England
- Sovereign state: United Kingdom
- Post town: Leicester
- Postcode district: LE7
- Police: Leicestershire
- Fire: Leicestershire
- Ambulance: East Midlands
- UK Parliament: Melton and Syston

Hamilton Lea is a village and civil parish on the edge of Leicester, Leicestershire, England.

== Geography ==
Hamilton Lea is a part of the more recent Hamilton development, which spilled over the Leicester city boundary into the Borough of Charnwood around Catteric Way and the northern stretches of Laverton Road and Hackness Road.

At 9.689 km² or 3.74 square miles, Hamilton Lea is the smallest inhabited civil parish in the United Kingdom by area, and the second smallest overall, after Chester Castle.

== Demographics ==
In the 2021 census, the Hamilton Lea had 1,168 inhabitants. The majority of residents, at 58%, were from a South Asian background, followed by 28% from a White background and the remainder were Black, Arab or mixed race. Hinduism was the most practiced religion in Hamilton Lea with 33% of the population identifying as Hindu. Christians and Muslims each made up 20% of the population followed by Sikhs at 8%, with the remaining 17% identifying as having no religion. In 2021, the parish has 248 dwellings. The population density was 120.5 people per km².

== Governance ==
Hamilton Lea is part Charnwood Borough Council's South Charnwood Villages ward and Leicestershire County Council's Thurmaston Ridgemere electoral division.

The Hamilton Lea civil parish was formed on 1 April 2019, from part of the Barkby Thorpe civil parish. As of 2024, Hamilton Lea has not established a parish council and holds an annual parish meeting, which all registered electors can attend.

== Gallery ==
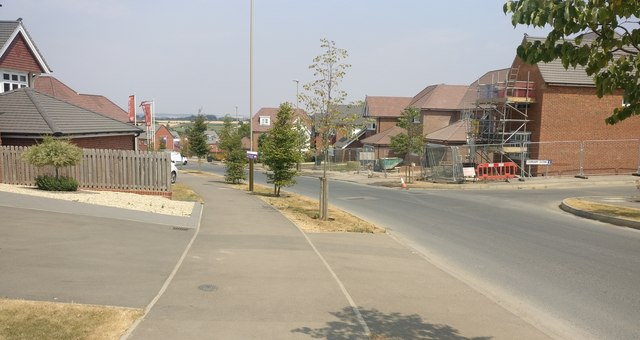
Laverton Road

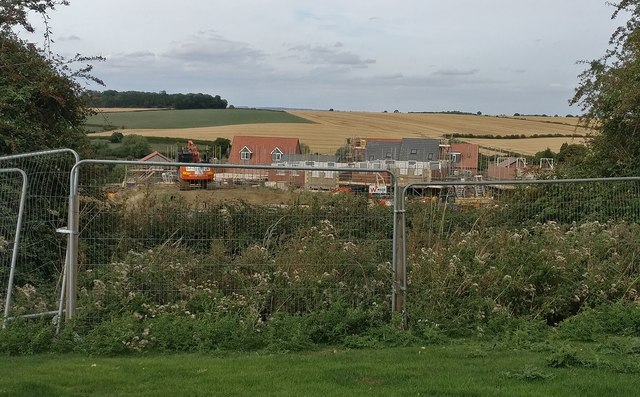
Hamilton Lea under construction

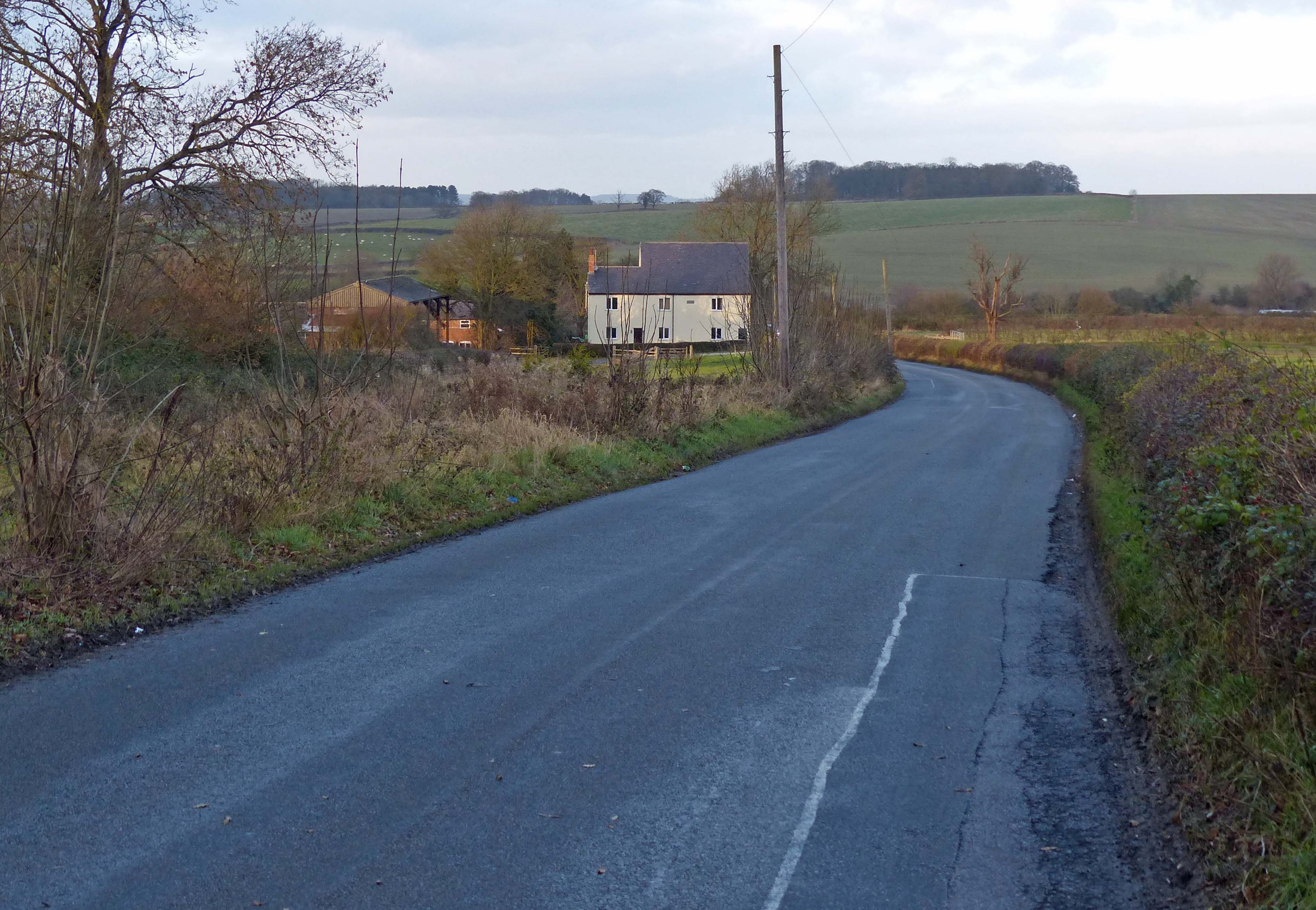
Hamilton Lane forms the eastern boundary of the parish

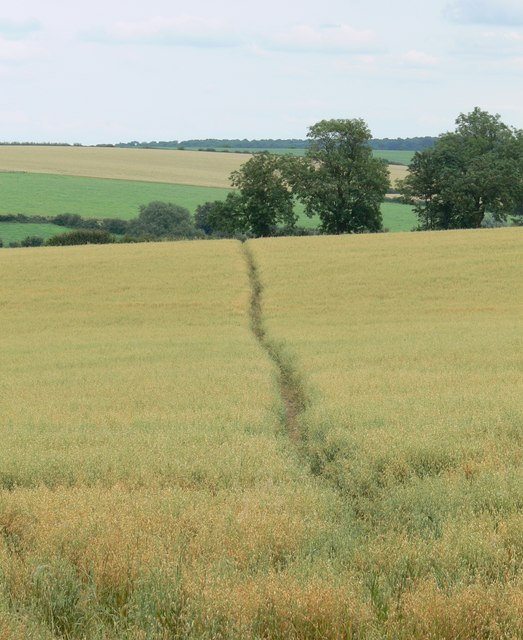
Public Footpath to the abandoned historic village of Hamilton
