= Violet Mary Doudney =

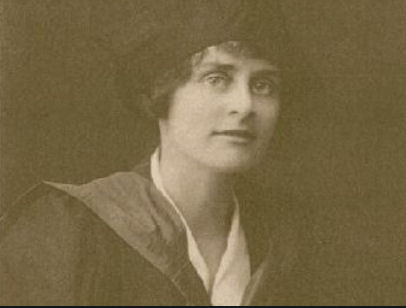
Violet Mary Doudney at St Hilda's College (c.1921)

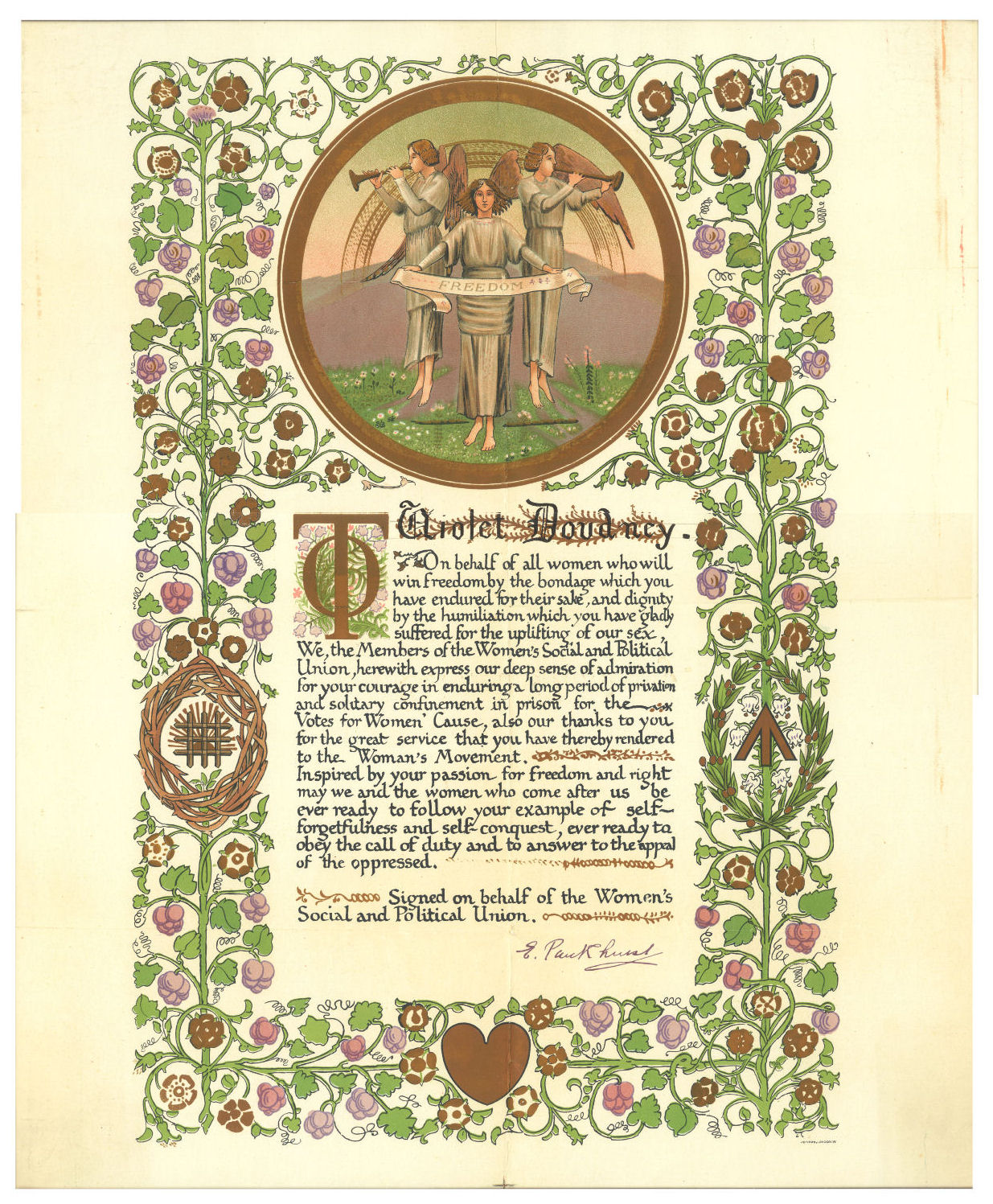
Certificate awarded to Violet Doudney for her support and dedication to the Suffragette Movement, after she had endured a hunger strike and solitary confinement at Holloway Prison in 1912. Designed by Sylvia Pankhurst and signed by Emmeline Pankhurst.

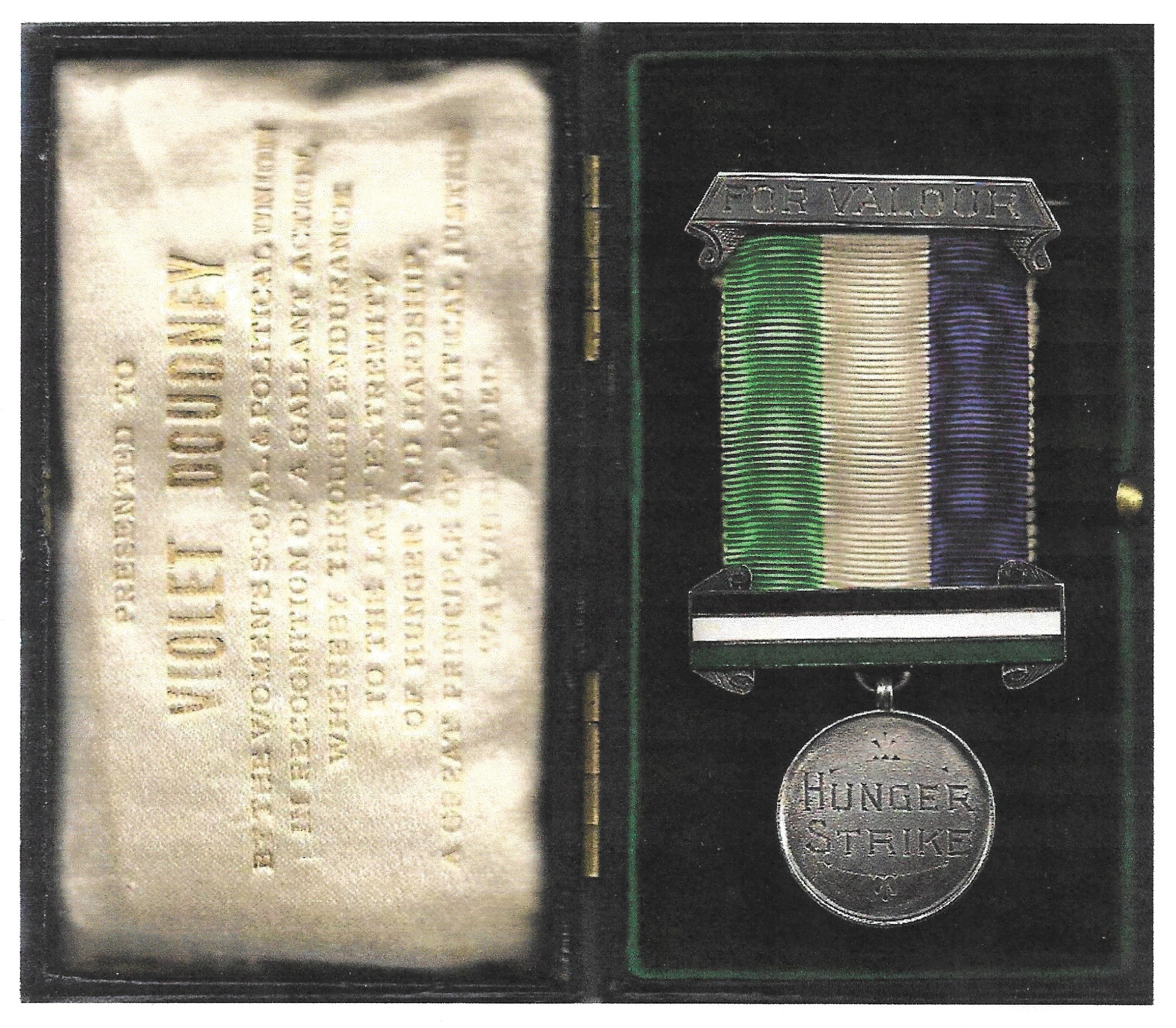
Hunger Strike Medal awarded to Violet Doudney by the leadership of the Women's Social and Political Union (WSPU) after her imprisonment at HM Prison Holloway in 1912

Violet Mary Doudney (5 March 1889 – 14 January 1952) was a teacher and militant suffragette who went on hunger strike in Holloway Prison where she was force-fed. She was awarded the Hunger Strike Medal by the Women's Social and Political Union (WSPU).

== Early life ==
Violet Doudney was born in 1889 in Barkby in Leicestershire, the daughter of Laura Annie née Rice (1858–1939) and George Richard Doudney (1859–1913), a corn merchant. She matriculated at St Hilda's College at the University of Oxford in 1908, from where she graduated in 1911 aged 21.

== Militancy ==
The following year in 1912 she moved to London with the intention of becoming a teacher. Here she joined the Women's Social and Political Union and took part in a window-smashing campaign of the homes of senior politicians to protest against the treatment of suffragette prisoners who were on hunger strike. On 28 June 1912 Doudney smashed the windows at the home of Home Secretary Reginald McKenna following which she was arrested and taken before magistrates the next morning. In court she was asked if she regretted her actions; she replied that she did not and had taken the action in protest against the Home Secretary's policies. Sentenced to two months hard labour in Holloway Prison she went on hunger strike and despite her frailty was force-fed. On her release from prison she was awarded a Hunger Strike Medal by Emmeline Pankhurst.

Doudney's influential Leicestershire businessman father and her mother wrote to the Home Secretary requesting her early release from prison due to her ill health, stating that if the request was granted they would ensure she would take no further part in suffragette campaigns. When she discovered why she had been released from prison after only three weeks the enraged Violet Doudney wrote at once to the Home Secretary pointing out that as a 23-year-old woman she was capable of making her own decisions, adding:

"I understand that you ordered my release from H.M Prison Holloway on account of an undertaking given by my parents that I would do no more militant work. I wish you to understand that no pledge of any kind whatsoever has been even offered to me and that I have give no undertaking whatsoever. Moveover I am of age and I do not consider myself in any way bound by any pledge given without my knowledge or consent and I certainly intend to take, "militant" or otherwise which may appear necessary to me to be necessary and justifiable in advancing a cause which I have at heart... If upon receipt of this letter you think you have released me on false pretences and wish me to return to Holloway I am willing to do so."

She did not receive a reply and undertook secretarial work for the suffragette cause for the next two years before becoming a teacher of English Literature and drama in 1914, a career she followed for 25 years.

== Later years ==
Violet married the architect Sidney Toy (1875–1967) on 11 July 1929 at Holy Trinity Church, Leicester. She had met him the year before in Constantinople, modern day Istanbul, on the same evening she had attended a ball where Mustafa Kemal Atatürk attempted to persuade her to stay and teach girls as part of his effort to modernise and secularise the new Republic of Turkey. Together Violet and Sidney had three sons, John Toy (1930–2022), Mark Toy (1932–2019), and Alaric Toy (1933–2004). In 2018, the eldest son John recalled: "My father was a typical Victorian man and wasn't in favour of women having the vote. He asked her not to talk about this episode and she didn’t tell us until the day the Second World War broke out. I’m very proud of what she did. She always taught us to be angry at any injustices." (Sidney Toy was the author of a number of books on fortifications including The Castles of Great Britain and The Strongholds of India. The 1939 edition of Castles: A Short History of Fortifications is dedicated "To my wife, in gratitude for consistent help and encouragement the book is affectionately dedicated")

In 1939 she retired from teaching at which time she and her husband were living in the City of London near the Temple Church where they were both ARP Wardens, with Violet Toy also undertaking first-aid duties.

Violet Mary Toy died in Epsom in Surrey in 1952.

== Legacy ==
=== Brent Women of Renown ===
Violet Doudney was celebrated, amongst Dame Stephanie Shirley and Amy Johnson, as one of the "Brent Women of Renown" in a project that shared her story to students in Brent schools throughout 2023. On 6 November 2023, a documentary about the "Brent Women of Renown" was premiered at the Kiln Cinema in Kilburn, where Doudney's granddaughter, Maggie Toy, was interviewed alongside other guests.

=== Epsom College, Doudney House (Lower School) ===
In 2025, Epsom College named one of its new Houses 'Doudney' in recognition of Violet's time spent teaching English and Drama at the college during the Second World War.
