= Sileby brewery =

Victorian tower brewery in Leicestershire, England

William Sharpe's and Sons Steam Brewery
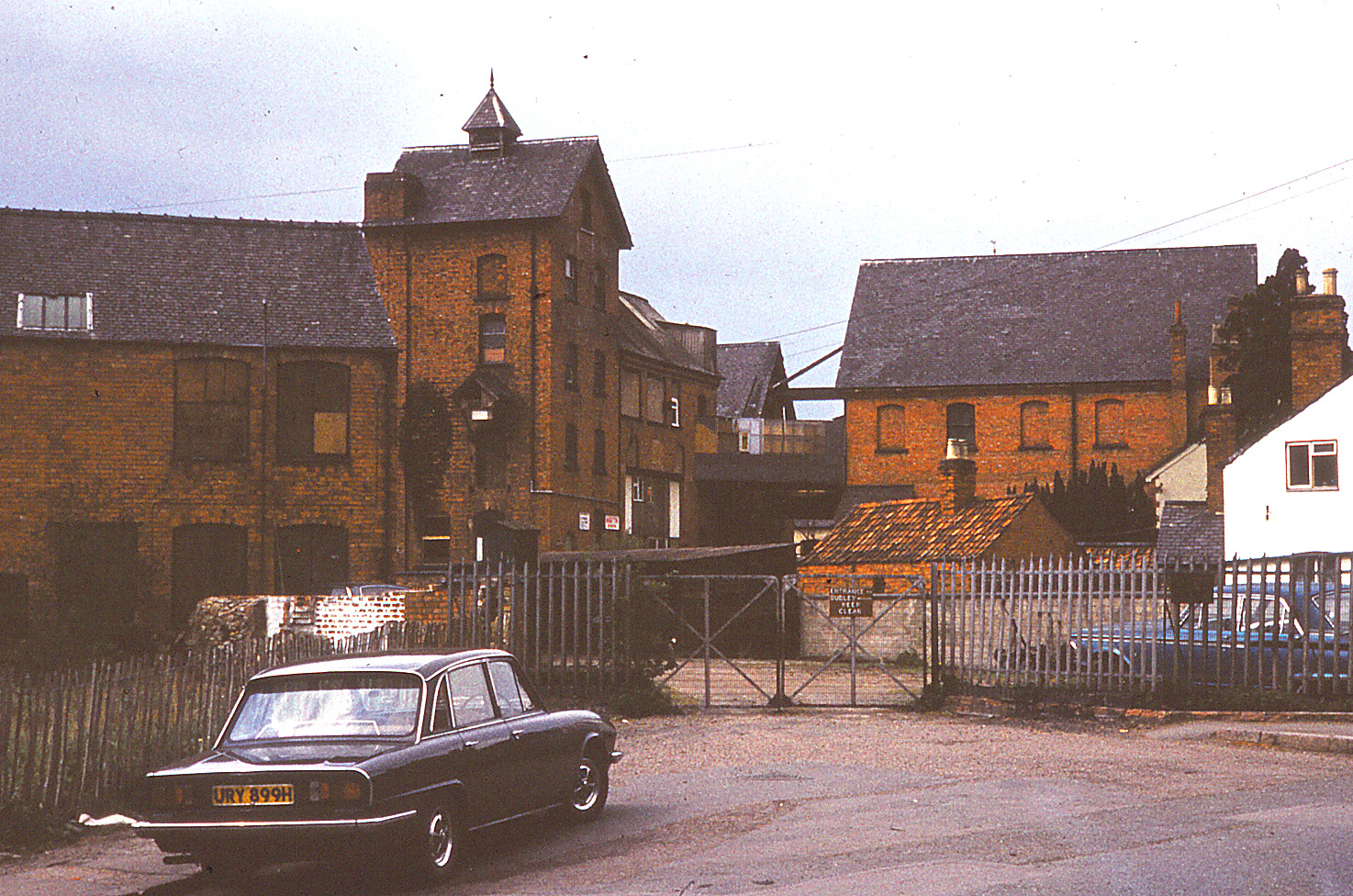
- Sileby Brewery, late 1970s
- Type: Brewery
- Industry: Brewing
- Founded: 1860s
- Founder: William Sharpe
- Defunct: 1920s
- Successor: Strettons of Derby
- Headquarters: Sileby, England
- Area served: Leicestershire
- Products: Beer

Sileby brewery was a Victorian tower brewery located in Sileby in Leicestershire, England.

== History ==
In the 1860s William Sharpe founded a brewery behind the Duke of York pub. In the 1870s it was being run by William's two sons, William and Frederick. William Sharpe senior died in 1877. The brewery was famed for its stout and by 1883 it was being supplied to the much larger All Saints Brewery in Leicester. The building was enlarged in 1884 and the early 20th century and is now listed by Historic England

In 1905 Elijah Betts was the Head Brewer after replacing a Mr Goss who fell down the stairs and died of pneumonia. In 1907 Horace Yates joined the brewery and stayed there until it closed.

The brewery was put up for sale by auction on 12 June 1906 by the Leicester auctioneering company of Warner Sheppard and Wade. It was described as a modern 15 quarter freehold brewery with two maltings and 41 licensed houses. The maltings were capable of 30 quarters. There was a cooper’s shop and a bottling plant packaging 12 hogsheads a week: 5 of stout and 7 of ale. There was a Burton union room with 6 sets. Barrelage per year was 11702 barrels. There were two wells for brewing liquor and Leicester Town for the steam boiler. There was stabling for 18 horses and the offices were next to the Duke of York.

The sale was at the request of William Henry Sharpe, Henry Tyler and Eliza Elizabeth Sharpe, widow of Frederic Sharpe. No buyers came forward.

The brewery closed after a take-over by Strettons of Derby in September 1920. Brewing probably ceased here in 1922 though Allsopps who bought out Strettons (in 1927) were malting here until the 1930s. Plunkett Brothers Ltd of Dublin (who supplied malt to Guinness) malted here until 1972.

Part of the site was later converted into housing.

== Public houses ==
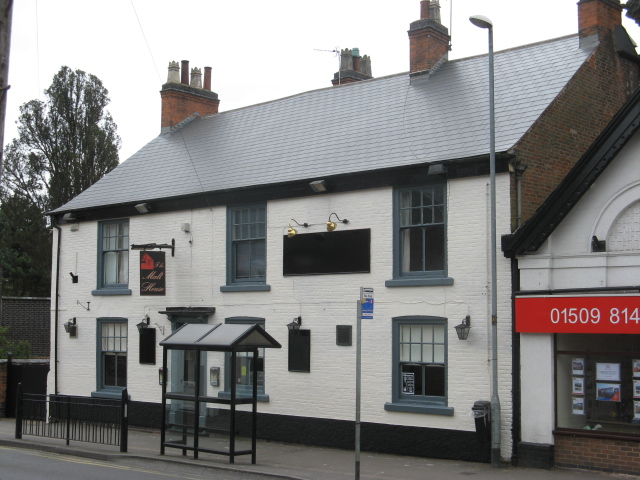
The brewery tap The Duke of York PH became the Malt House but is now closed

The brewery owned 15 licensed houses and 20 off-licenses at the time of sale in 1920:

- Leicester: The Cape of Good Hope and the Full Moon.
- Sileby: The Duke of York, the Horse and Trumpet and the White Swan.
- Other towns/villages: Mountsorrell (4), Barrow (2), Rothley (1), Wigston (1), Birstall (2), Syston (1), Thrussington (1) and Seagrave (2).

The Duke of York was sold separately.

== Beers ==
The main beers listed in late 1880s trade directories were:

- Celebrated Stout
- Double Stout
- Bitter Beer

== Gallery ==
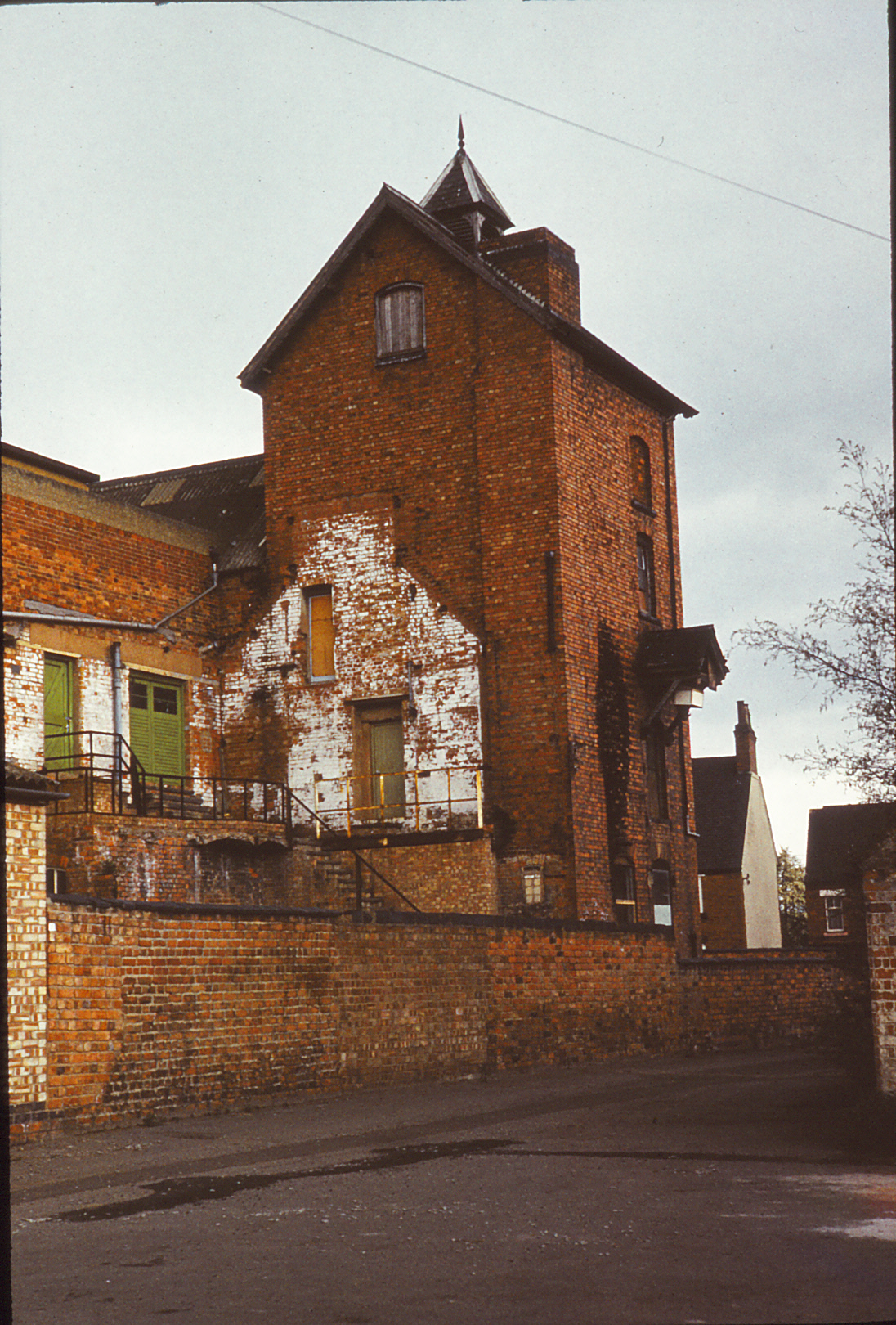
Maltings Tower late 1970s

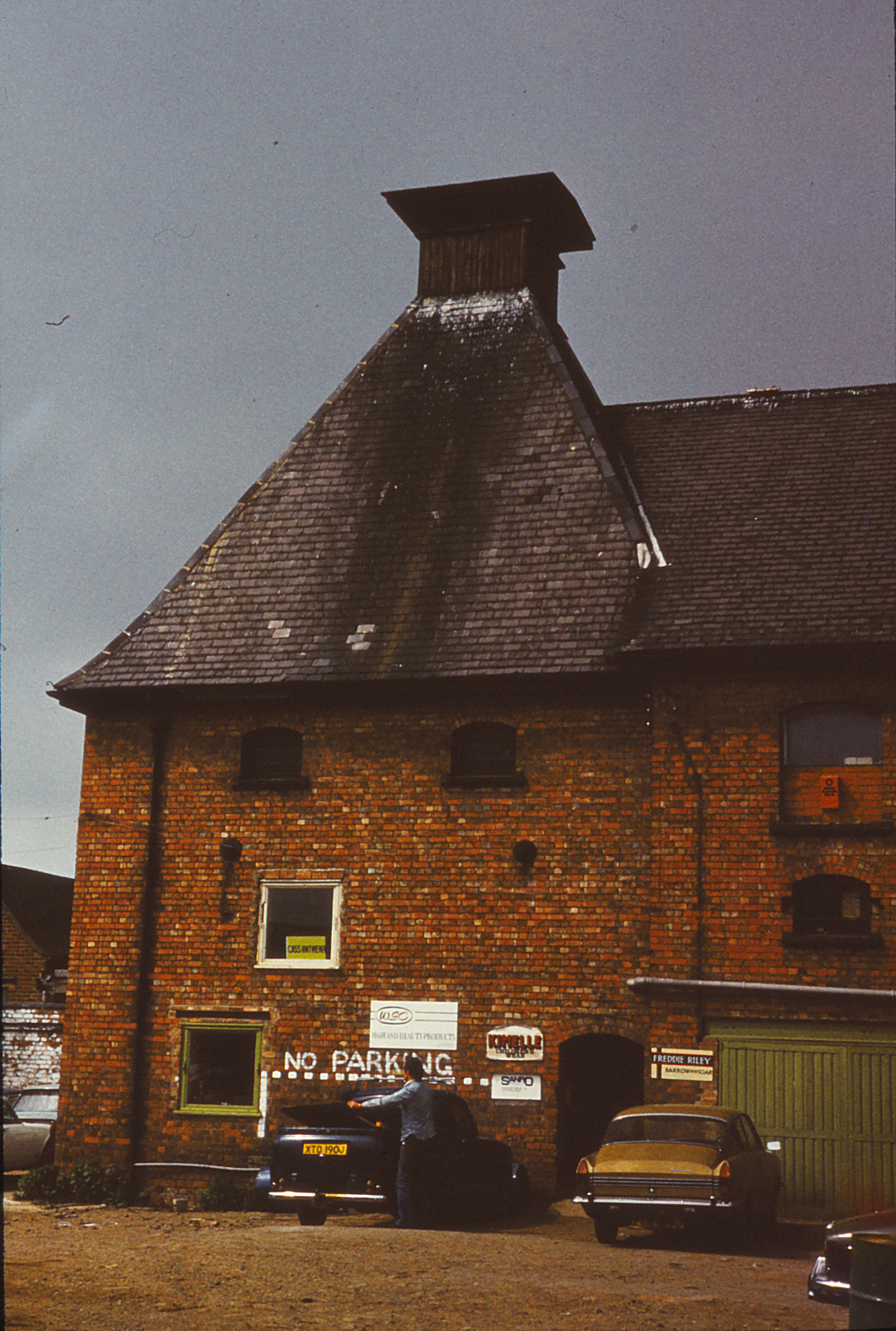
Maltings at brewery being used for car repairs late 1970s

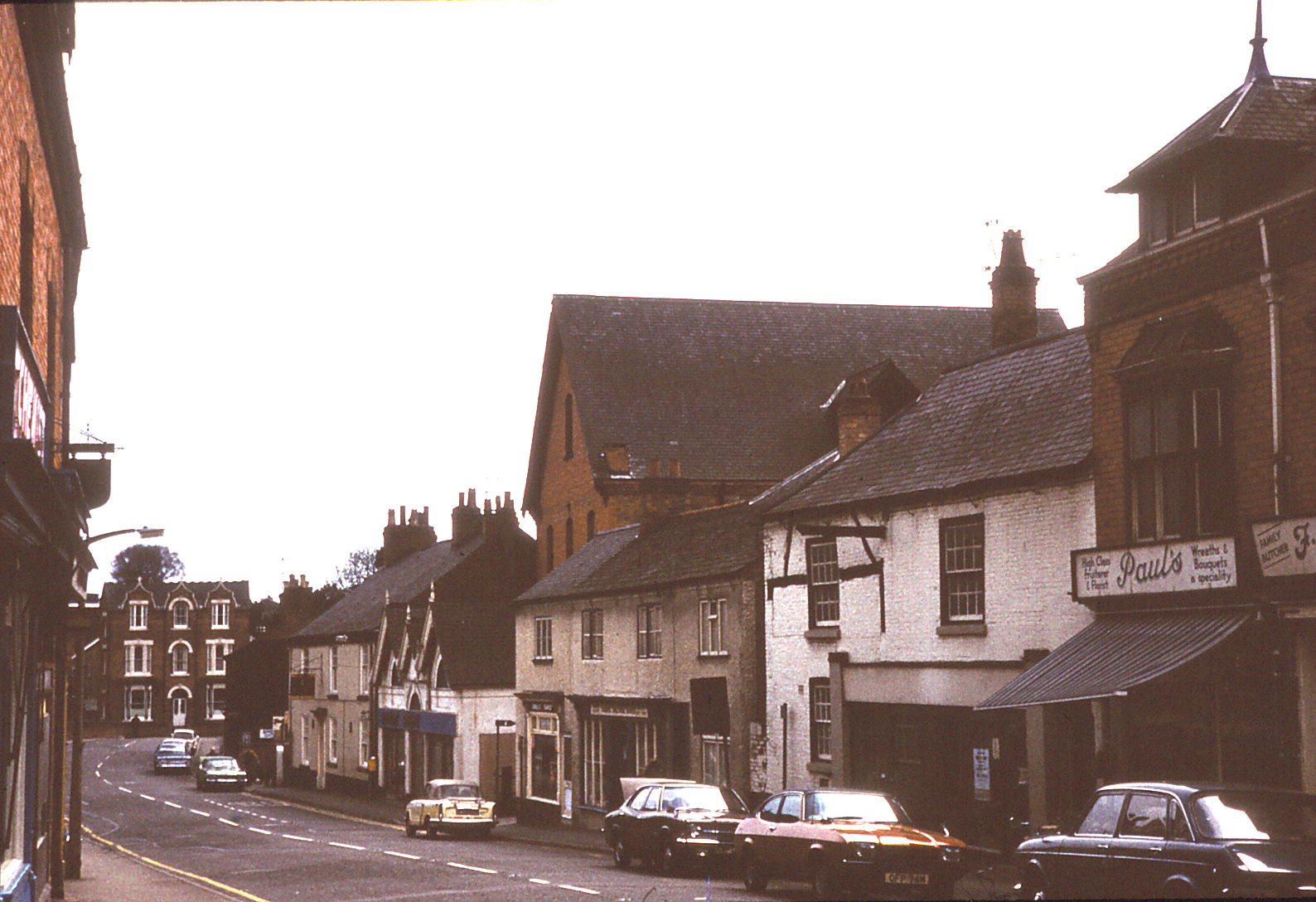
High St - The Duke of York PH is on the right - 1970s

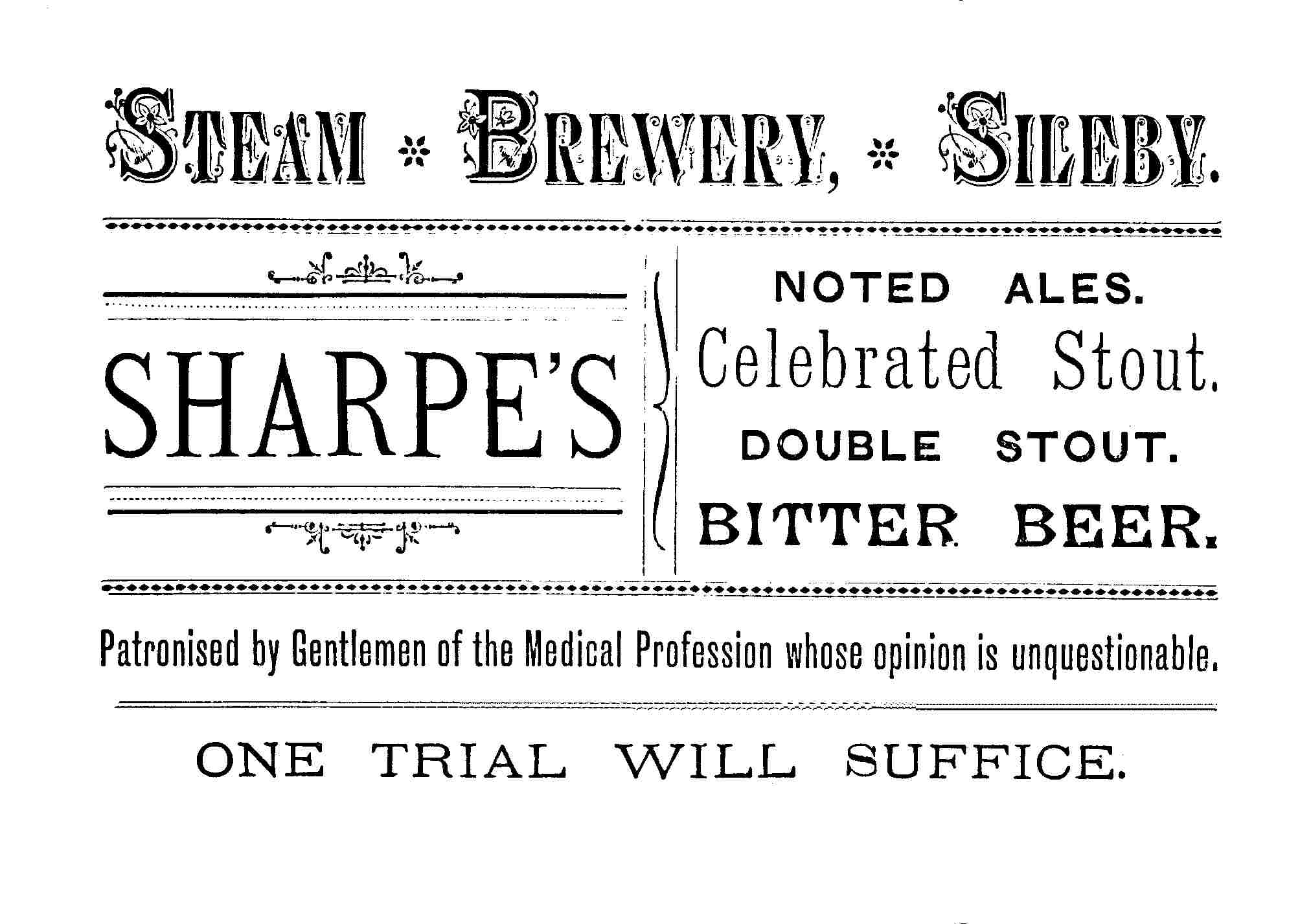
Victorian trade directory entry

== Sources ==
- Brown, Mike (1999). Tiger Tales and Ales, pp. 164/165, Brewery History Society.
- Thomas, Barry. "Leicestershire and Rutland Breweries"
