= South Croxton =

Village in Leicestershire, England

Coordinates: 52.6879°N 0.9857°W

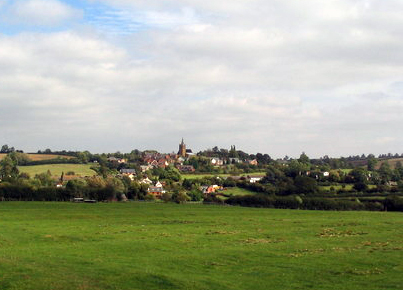
- A view towards South Croxton

- Location within Leicestershire
- Population: 261 (2011)
- OS grid reference: SK685105
- District: Charnwood
- Shire county: Leicestershire
- Region: East Midlands
- Country: England
- Sovereign state: United Kingdom
- Post town: Leicester
- Postcode district: LE7
- Police: Leicestershire
- Fire: Leicestershire
- Ambulance: East Midlands
- UK Parliament: Melton and Syston

South Croxton (traditionally pronounced "crow-sun" [ˈkroʊsən]) is a village and civil parish in the Charnwood district of Leicestershire, England. It had a population of 261 in the 2011 census. It is 7.5 miles (12 km) north-east of Leicester city centre. Nearby villages include Beeby, Barsby and Twyford.

== Governance and facilities ==
The Parish Council holds open meetings on the first Monday of each month in the Village Hall. The Village Hall Committee meets there on the second Thursday of the month. A programme of improvements to the hall begun in 2007 continues. The Golden Fleece relaunched in 2008 as a pub/restaurant but closed in August 2023. Villagers are currently working towards saving the pub as an "Asset of Community Value" and reopening it as a facility for all. The village also has riding stables in Three Turns Lane, a Women's Institute that meets monthly, and a Wednesday Luncheon Club meeting every other month.

The village is served on Monday to Saturday by the daytime bus service No. 100 between Syston and Melton Mowbray, (https://www.centrebus.info/bus-services/leicester-city-and-leicestershire/100/) both of which have railway stations. The local school closed in July 1972, and became the village hall. The nearest primary school today is at Gaddesby, 2 1/2 miles or 4 km away. There have been no shops since 1995, but there is a playing field with a slide and a single football goal.

The highest point is the church, at 120 m above mean sea level. The lowest altitude is 85 m by the Queniborough Brook.

== Heritage ==
The recorded population of South Croxton in the last two centuries varied between a high of 324 in 1851 and to a low of 153 in 1951. It was 234 at the time of the 2001 census and 261 ten years later. The moated area to the north of the church formed part of a medieval manor enclosure and has yielded Saxon remains. Signs of medieval ridge-and-furrow field patterns can be seen to the north of the moated area.

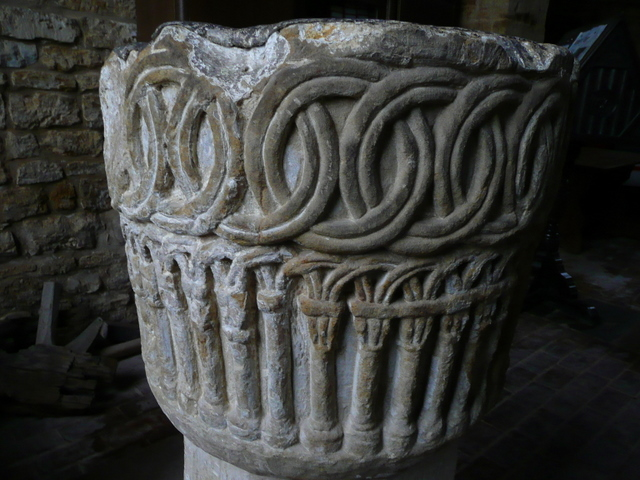
Carved stone font at St John's church

The Grade II* listed Church of St John's and four farmhouses in the parish (Bell Dip, Hill Top, North Manor, South Manor) are listed historic buildings. The village was designated as a Conservation Area in 1975 for its special architectural and historic interest. It has 90 houses, a 14th-century church, a pub (the Golden Fleece) and a village hall, formerly the local school. A considerable number of unlisted buildings are also of architectural interest, having "survived relatively unchanged over the last hundred years." Some are still roofed in slate quarried at nearby Swithland, some later ones in Welsh slate.

As a community South Croxton antedates Domesday (where it is referred to as Crochestone) and probably the coming of the Danes. It appears as "Sudcroxtun" in the Coroner’s Rolls (county records) of 1212. There were two manors known as Nether End and Upper End, divided by the Queniborough brook. These were enclosed in 1757 and 1794 respectively. A frame-knitting industry had become established in the village by the first quarter of the 18th century. The group of older houses down School Lane once formed a separate hamlet called West Thorpe. Since the 1960s, the character of South Croxton has largely changed from a farming community into a dormitory suburb for Leicester.

In 2000, a grant was obtained to clean up the Queniborough Brook at the bridge and to provide seating there and at the top of the hill. Halfway up the hill, a little obelisk made of tiles produced by local children was placed to mark the Golden Jubilee of Elizabeth II in 2002. There is a public footpath from Lowesby past the deserted medieval village of Baggrave to South Croxton. This passes the mid-18th century Baggrave Hall, which was badly damaged by developers in 1988–89 and then abandoned. There is also a public footpath following the brook to the village of Queniborough.

The Anglican church of St John the Baptist is the only place of worship in the village, although there was at one time a Methodist congregation. The Anglican parish is united with All Saints', Beeby. It forms part of the South West Framland Cluster of Parishes. The church is built in the late Decorated style, of local honey-coloured Waltham ironstone and dates mainly from the early 14th century, when it replaced an earlier stone building probably from the Saxon period. However, the Romanesque font of the earlier church remains. The south aisle and the roof were built a hundred years later. The bells, cast in 1636, remain in the tower, but unhung. Extensive repairs had to be made in 1925 due to subsidence. A 15th-century oak roof corbel from the church is displayed at the Charnwood Museum in Loughborough.

=== Notable people ===
- Ambrose Lisle March Phillipps De Lisle (1809–1878), founder of Mount St. Bernard Abbey, attended a private school here in 1818.
- Bob Gerard, the racing driver, died here in 1990.

=== Croxton of old ===
"CROXTON (South), a parish in Barrow-upon-Soar district, Leicester; on an affluent of the river Wreak, 4 miles SSE of Brooksby r. station, and 7 SW of Melton-Mowbray. It has a post office, of the name of Croxton, under Leicester. Acres, 1,760. Real property, £2,535. Pop., 311. Houses, 68. The property is subdivided. The living is a rectory in the diocese of Peterborough. Value, £130. Patron, the Duke of Rutland. The church is old but good; and comprises nave, aisles, chancel, and steeple. Charities, £32 and four cottages." [John Marius Wilson's "Imperial Gazetteer of England and Wales." 1870-72]

A book of descriptive and oral history, South Croxton: The Village on the Hill by Philip Snelders, was published in 2007 and reprinted in 2008.
