= Sidney Toy =

British architect (1875–1967)

Sidney Toy (1875–1967) was a British architect and architectural historian.

== Life ==
Toy was born on 15 February 1875 in Redruth in Cornwall. Toy became a Fellow of the Royal Institute of British Architects in 1924. While travelling in the Middle East, Toy met teacher and militant suffragette Violet Mary Doudney and they married in Leicester in 1929. Doudney had been imprisoned in 1912 for smashing the window of the Home Secretary. In 2018, the Toy's eldest son, John. recalled "My father was a typical Victorian man and wasn't in favour of women having the vote. He asked her not to talk about the incident [i.e., her imprisonment] and she didn't tell us until the day the Second World War broke out."

In 1939, Toy published Castles through Heinemann; it was one of the major works on castles in the 1920s and 1930s. He wrote the entry on castles for the Encyclopædia Britannica, published in 1959. As an architectural historian, Toy specialised in military architecture and his work continues to inform research into the 21st century.

== Selected publications ==
- Castles (1939)
- Castles of Great Britain (1953)
- A History of Fortification from 3000 BC to 1700 AD (1955)
- Strongholds of India (1958)
- Fortified Cities of India (1965)

== Bibliography ==
- Guy, Neil (2011–2012). "Sidney Toy - a biography" (PDF). The Castle Studies Group Journal. 25: 208–223.
- Kenyon, John (2017). "'Those proud ambitious heaps': whither castle studies?". Archaeologia Cambrensis. 166: 1–31. doi:10.5284/1081843.
