= Sileby =

Village in Leicestershire, England

Coordinates: 52.731°N 1.106°W

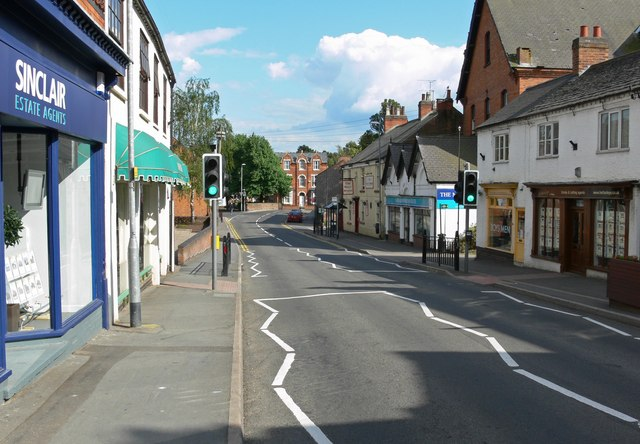
- Sileby High Street

- Location within Leicestershire
- Population: 8,959 (2021 Census)
- OS grid reference: SK604151
- District: Charnwood
- Shire county: Leicestershire
- Region: East Midlands
- Country: England
- Sovereign state: United Kingdom
- Post town: LOUGHBOROUGH
- Postcode district: LE12
- Dialling code: 01509
- Police: Leicestershire
- Fire: Leicestershire
- Ambulance: East Midlands
- UK Parliament: Melton and Syston

Sileby is a former industrial village and civil parish in the Soar Valley in the Charnwood borough of Leicestershire, England. It is located between Leicester and Loughborough. The village is close to Barrow upon Soar, Mountsorrel, Ratcliffe-on-the-Wreake, Seagrave and Cossington. The population of the civil parish at the 2011 census was 7,835, rising to 8,959 at the 2021 census.

The origins of the village date back to around 840 AD when the area was settled by the Danes - Leicestershire forming part of the Danelaw along with other counties in the vicinity. The name Sileby may in fact come from the Danish name "Sighulf".

The village lies at the bottom of an ancient valley created by the nearby River Soar, meaning that surrounding farmland is particularly prone to flooding during persistent or heavy rain.

== History ==
Traditionally, Sileby was split into two wards, separated by the brook that flows through the middle of the village. These are St Mary's to the north and St Gregory's to the south. However, due to Boundary Commission changes, a third ward of "Barrow West" was added, albeit as an arbitrary boundary essentially for electoral purposes.

One of Sileby's most notable landmarks is the Anglican church of St. Mary founded around 1152 and a Grade II* listed building, The Gothic tower now houses a ring of ten bells.

Sileby Primitive Methodist Church was built in 1866 to the designs of James Kerridge. Sileby Wesleyan Methodist Church on High Street was built in 1884.

Sileby industrialised heavily over the Victorian period, with several hosiery and shoe factories present in the village until as recently as the 1980s, as well as a wallpaper manufacturer and several engineering companies. Nearly all of these have now disappeared and most of the factory premises have long since been demolished and replaced by new housing estates - it is now a commuter town for people who work throughout the East Midlands and beyond.

== Transport ==
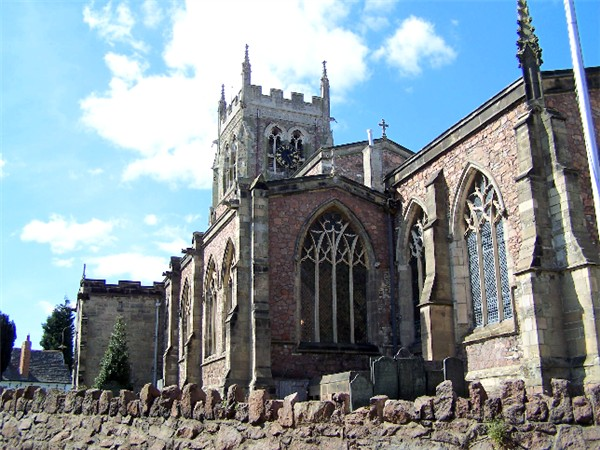
St. Mary's parish church, Sileby

The village has a railway station on the Ivanhoe Line, and trains run hourly to Leicester, Loughborough, Nottingham and Lincoln.

Centrebus service 27 and Kinchbus service 2 both link Sileby to Loughborough which also gives further connections to the Skylink Leicester-Derby buses which run to East Midlands Airport which is around 15 miles away. The Kinchbus service to Leicester was withdrawn on 4 September 2022, leaving the village with no bus service to the city, no evening service to Loughborough and no public transport whatsoever on Sundays.

Local road transport links via the nearby A6 and A46 link directly to the M1, which lies to the west. The A46 to the village's east follows the route of the Fosse Way to Lincoln in the north and provides a link to the east coast of England. The local area is prone to flooding from the River Soar and its tributaries, meaning that access and egress can be limited in persistently wet weather with some local roads becoming impassable for days or even weeks at a time during autumn/winter/spring.

The proximity to the River Soar also means that Sileby has an active marina.

== Facilities ==
Current facilities/amenities in the village include:

- Two doctors surgeries
- Two pharmacies
- One Opticians (accepts NHS and private patients)
- Two primary schools
- Several places of worship for the various Christian denominations
- Several pre-school/nursery establishments
- Two smaller-size supermarkets (Tesco and Costcutter)
- One dentist (accepts NHS and private patients)
- Numerous takeaway food establishments
- Various shops, "beauty salons" and cafes (mostly concentrated in the High Street and King Street area)
- Two vehicle maintenance garages offering MOT tests/servicing etc.
- Two private members-only gyms
- Kickboxing club through KickboxUK (Professional Kickboxing Association – Sileby)
- Several sports pitches/facilities and community park areas
- High Street Accountants

There are no Police/Fire/Ambulance stations or hospitals in or around Sileby. The nearest Police station is at Loughborough. The nearest Fire station is at Birstall. Ambulances and paramedic vehicles regularly patrol the local area but the nearest Accident & Emergency facilities are at Leicester Royal Infirmary. For less serious/urgent incidents treatment can be obtained at Loughborough Urgent Care Centre.

Other absent facilities include a petrol station (the nearest one is approx. 3 miles away), swimming pool (nearest one is at Mountsorrel's Soar Valley Leisure Centre) or refuse/recycling facility (again, the nearest one is at Mountsorrel).

== Sport ==
Sileby has a great number of sporting clubs, many of which have enjoyed success in recent years. There are well established clubs and facilities for cricket, football, Kickboxing, tennis, lawn bowls, rugby, baseball and shooting amongst others.

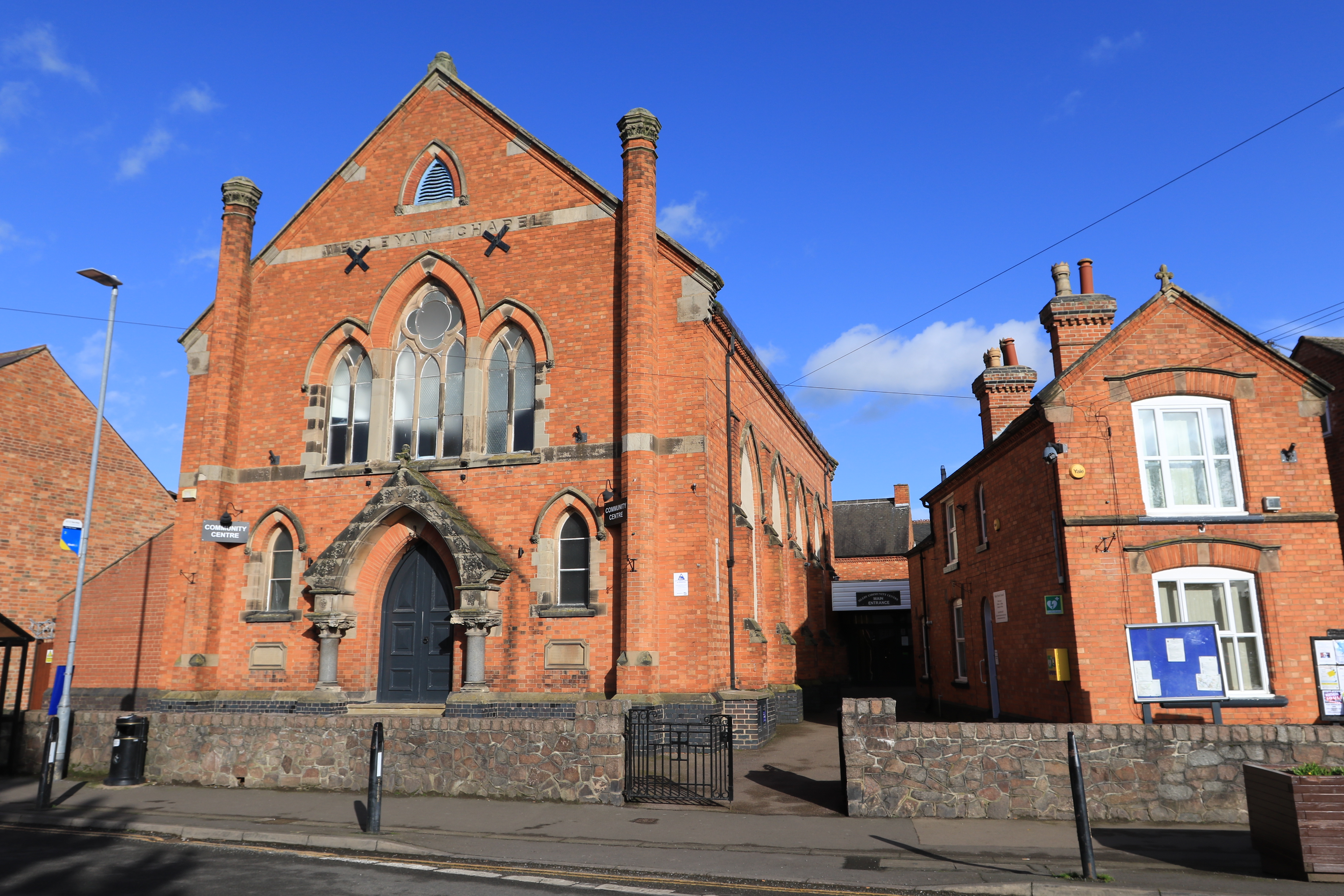
Sileby Community Centre, High Street

KickboxUK, a Professional Kickboxing Association club has two Kickboxing classes broken down into age groups that take place in Sileby Community Centre every week on Monday, there are 2 different classes which run, a Juniors Class and an Adults Class.

Sileby Town Rugby Football Club (also known as the Sileby Vikings) was established in 2006 and now plays in Midlands Division 4 East (South), as well as the local Leicestershire Leagues, using the facilities at Platts Lane Recreation Ground in the nearby village of Cossington. They currently run a First XV, Second XV and since August 2015 a Ladies XV has also been added. They also raise thousands of pounds for local and national charities in August each year by pulling a 10-tonne truck for 10 miles through the local villages using nothing but people power. This is a very popular event that draws crowds of villagers along the route and also to welcome them back and join in the celebrations.

Sileby Town Cricket Club competes in the Leicestershire & Rutland Cricket League, and the club's first team play in the league's Premier Division. In 2025, the first team will be captained by Josh Winterton.

== Community ==
Sileby has a community magazine, Talk@Sileby. The magazine is published by volunteers three times a year..

Sileby Community Centre is located on the High Street in what was formerly Sileby Wesleyan Methodist Church.

Sileby Library was handed over by L.C.C. to a group of trustees/volunteers in December 2015 and is now known as Sileby Community Library.

There is an active Scout group which meets at its HQ on Brook Street and includes Rainbows, Brownies, Guides, Beavers, Cubs and Scouts classes on weekday evenings.

Sileby has shifted from its industrial past producing clothing to being a commuter town, with few industrial buildings remaining. Notable survivors are the factories on Seagrave Road, currently occupied by the village's last remaining hosier.

== Development ==
The village has expanded greatly, with several hundred new houses having been built and the former "Maltings" buildings (part of an old brewery that used to be based in the village in the 1800s) redeveloped as houses and flats.

Sileby has seen increased housing developments due to the selling of local agricultural areas and farmlands, such as the estate off Ratcliffe Road, near to Ratcliffe on the Wreake, two more developments have also been completed near the village of Seagrave. There are plans for a new housing estate to be built between Sileby and Cossington.

== Notable residents ==
- David Howe, speedway rider
