= Barkby =

Village in Leicestershire, England

Coordinates: 52.682°N 1.062°W

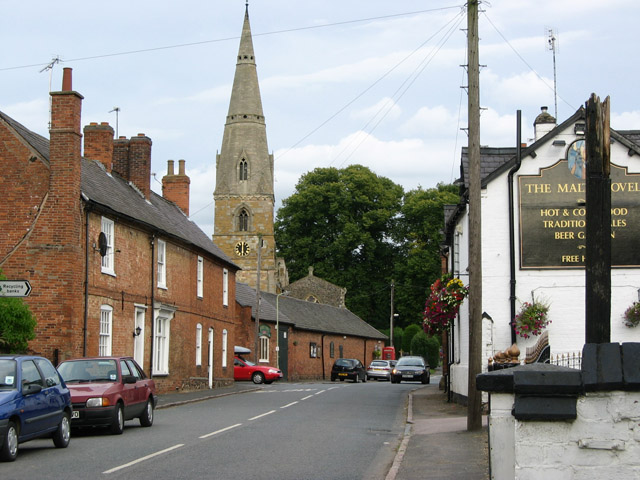
- Main Street

- Location within Leicestershire
- Population: 316 (2011 Census)
- OS grid reference: SK6340409818
  - London: 109 mi (175 km)
- Civil parish: Barkby
- Shire county: Leicestershire
- Region: East Midlands
- Country: England
- Sovereign state: United Kingdom
- Post town: Leicester
- Postcode district: LE7
- Dialling code: 0116
- Police: Leicestershire
- Fire: Leicestershire
- Ambulance: East Midlands
- UK Parliament: Melton and Syston

Barkby is a village and civil parish in the Charnwood district of Leicestershire, England. It is situated north-east of Leicester, and only a short way from Leicester's urban sprawl in Thurmaston and Syston. Nearby villages are Beeby and Barkby Thorpe. Barkby Brook is the main watercourse which flows through Barkby. The parish has a population of around 300.

In the 1870s John Marius Wilson stated that Barkby,

"lies on an affluent of the river Wreak, 1½ mile S by E of Syston r. station, and 4½ NE of Leicester; and it includes the hamlet of Hambleton."

== History ==
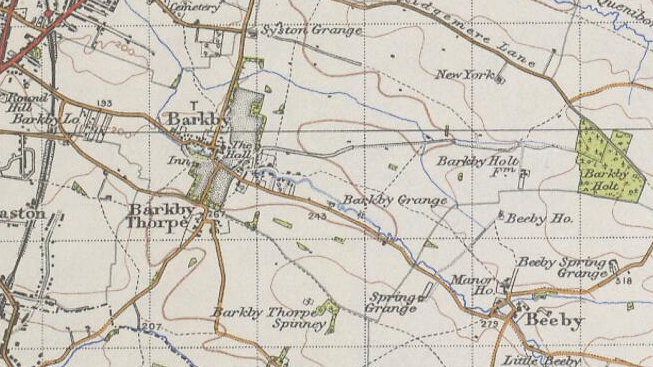
20th century map showing Barkby, Leicestershire

The 1086 Domesday Book records Barkby as "Barcheberie". The name Barkby itself has an Old Norse origin meaning "Barki's farm/settlement". Barkby Hall, home and seat of the Pochin family since 1604, is a grade II listed building situated next to St Mary's Church. The country house has three storeys and an eight-bay frontage, constructed in rendered brick c.1810.

=== St Mary's Church ===
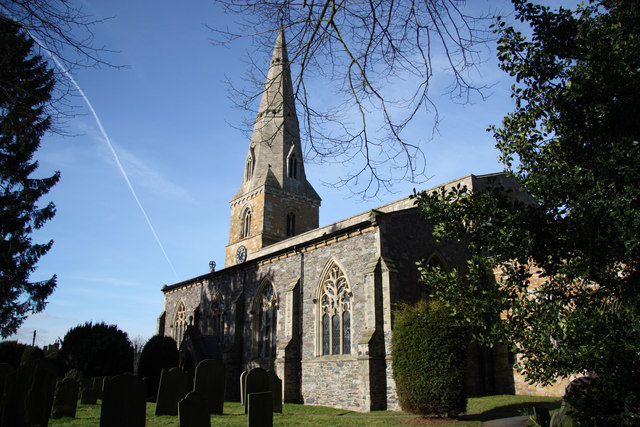
St Mary's Church, Barkby

St Mary's Church is the parish church, dedicated to St Mary. Earliest records state that the church was built in the late 13th century but its ground undertook extension in 1887. The grade I church was officially listed in June 1966. The church itself contains six bells and a two-aisle nave. The church also consists of a tower made up of four stages and a gothic organ case. Built primarily from ironstone, granite was infused into the buildings structure during restoration work in the 19th century. The presence of the Pochin family is also noticeable within St Mary's church as a number of memorials of past family members can also be found around the church.

=== Occupations ===
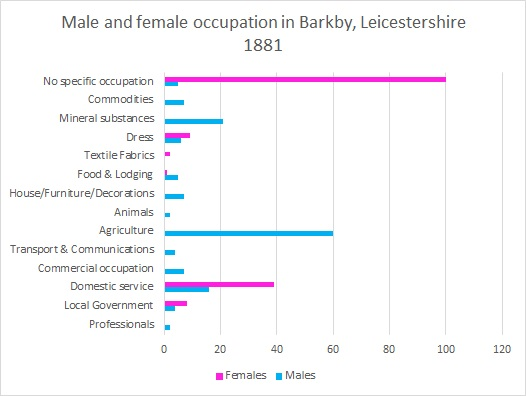
Male and female occupations in Barkby, Leicestershire in 1881

1881 gave birth to the most organised classification of occupation within a UK Census. The total population in Barby was revealed to be 579 in this year, 305 of which were of an age able to have a form of occupation. This can be compared to 2011 where 179 individuals were at employment age. Occupation sectors which were present in Barkby at this time included transport and communications, textile fabrics, and Local government.

However, a significant disparity in occupation between males and females was evident. In fact the 1881 Census showed that females were only present in five occupational sectors within Barkby; the majority being in domestic service or offices. The most male dominated industry at this time was the agricultural sector, where 60 males in Barbky were employed compared to 0 females. However the number of individuals working agriculture decreased significantly by 2011, with only seven Barkby residents now working in the sector. In 1881, the majority of females in Barkby (100) had no specific occupation compared to just 5 males with the same situation, however, this statistic does not necessarily indicate unemployment. In comparison, the disparities in occupation are not as noticeable in 2011, where the majority of both males (16) and females (20) can be found working in the wholesale and retail trade industry.

== Population ==
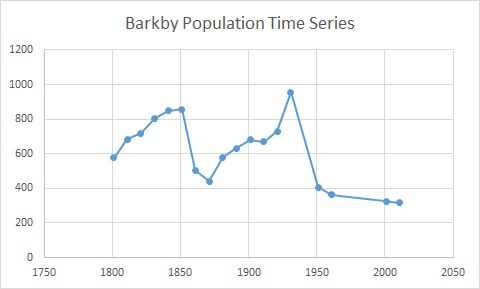
Total population of Barkby, Leicestershire, as reported by the Census of Population from 1801-2011

Barkby has a current population of 316 according to the United Kingdom Census 2011, however throughout its history, Barkby's population has fluctuated significantly. Between 1801 and 2011 the population peaked at 955 in 1931. Within this time period there has also been two major decreases in Barkby's population. These came in between 1851-1861 where population fell from 857 to 504 and also between 1931-1951 where population fell from 955 to 405. Since 1951 however, the population has continued to decrease.

== Geography ==
Barkby is situated approximately 5 miles from the centre of Leicester. The parish's landscape is dominated mostly by farmland from four farms. Nevertheless, the parish is not completely secluded as it is located adjacent to the villages of Syston and Thurmaston both of which have larger populations than Barkby. Barkby Brook is the main water source which runs through the parish. Classified as a "main river", Barkby Brook is currently managed by the Environment Agency.

== Education ==
Pochin school is the only school situated in Barkby. The primary school was initially founded by the Pochin family in the 1700s, who sought to provide education for the poorest children living in Barkby. The subjects taught in the school at this time were very different to what can be expected in the modern day education system. Needlework, singing and drilling were all subjects taught in the school's earliest days. During this time, the local church helped to fund and run the school, however, due to the Education Act 1944 responsibility for the school was handed over to the education authority.

As a primary school, Pochin school educates children aged between 4–11 years old. In 1869 the main building, which now contains 5 classrooms in total was built. A total of 142 children currently attend the school, from Barkby as well as surrounding villages such as Thurmaston and Queniborough due to its popularity. The school received an "Outstanding" rating on its latest Ofsted report in May 2014.

== North east of Leicester sustainable urban extension ==
The north east of Leicester sustainable urban extension (NEoLSUE) is a proposed development set in the area surrounding Barkby. Described as "locally distinctive, sustainable and thriving new community" the project will entail constructing up to 4500 new homes as well as health and school facilities. A number of green spaces are also proposed to be placed within the new community. The main purpose of this development is to facilitate the ever increasing urban sprawl of Leicester and its surrounding villages such as Thurmaston, reducing housing price pressures in the process. However, many in Barkby are very much against the development. One of their main arguments is the significant increase in traffic pressures on the roads in and around Barkby as a result of the development. All in all locals believe that such a development would threaten the rural idyll identity of the parish.

== Notable residents ==
- Violet Mary Doudney (1889–1952) - teacher and militant suffragette was born in the village
