= St Mary's Church, Sileby =

St Mary’s Church, Sileby
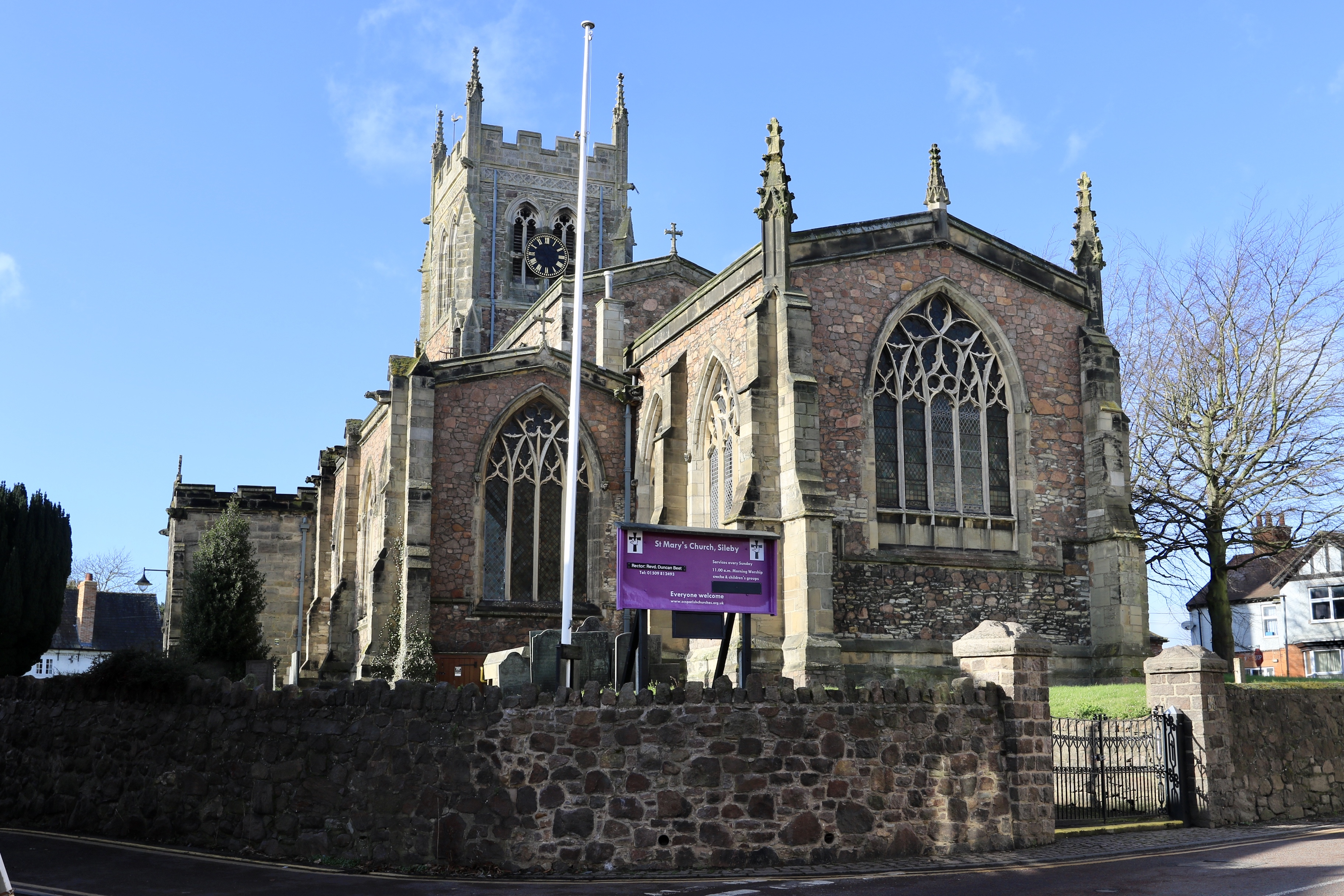
- St Mary’s Church, Sileby

- Location within Leicestershire
- 52°43′35.6″N 1°7′39.8″W
- OS grid reference: SK 60051 15174
- Location: Sileby
- Country: England
- Denomination: Church of England

History
- Dedication: Mary the Virgin

Architecture
- Heritage designation: Grade II* listed

Administration
- Diocese: Leicester
- Archdeaconry: Leicester
- Deanery: Goscote
- Parish: Sileby

St Mary's Church, Sileby is a parish church in the Church of England Diocese of Leicester in Sileby, Leicestershire.

== History ==
The church dates from the 13th to 15th centuries, but was heavily restored and underpinned between 1878 and 1880 at a cost of £5,300 (equivalent to £551,200 in 2025). Decayed foundations were replaced by a solid base of 2 ft of Portland cement and granite chips. Arches and windows which had previously been bricked up were opened out again. A new roof was installed, reusing as much of the medieval carved oak as possible. Mr. Goodwin of the Lugwardine Works, Hereford provided encaustic tiles to pave the chancel. Mr Powell of Whitefriars carved a new reredos for the high altar. The old high backed pews were removed ready for new seating. The three entrances were supplied with new oak doors, and a new floor was laid in the belfry. The work was carried out to the designs and supervision of the architect Arthur Blomfield.

== Organ ==
A pipe organ by George Holdich, improved by Abbott of Leeds was installed in 1882, the gift of J.R. Edmunds of Charnwood House, Sileby. The specification can be found on the National Pipe Organ Register.

== Bells ==
The tower contains a peal of 10 bells. The oldest date from 1622 by Hugh Watts, and the newest two were added in 1978 by John Taylor and Company of Loughborough.
