= Thurmaston =

Village in Leicestershire, England

Coordinates: 52.6752°N 1.0992°W

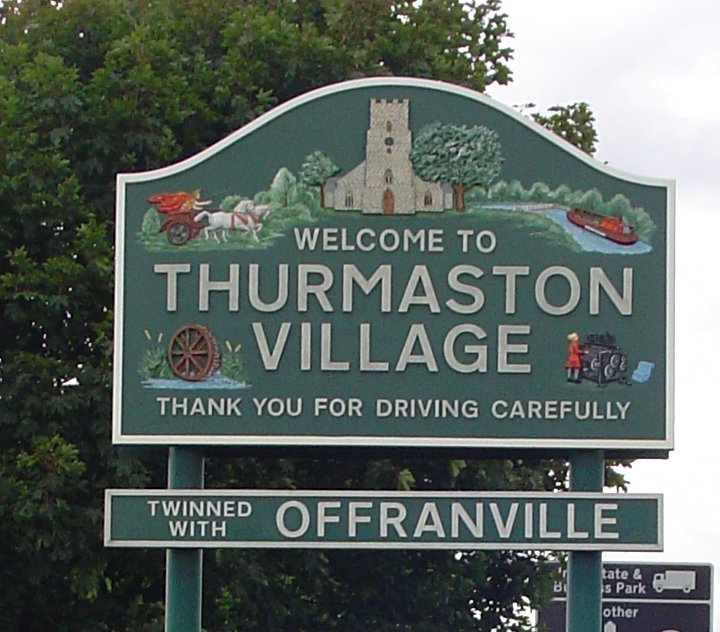

- Location within Leicestershire
- Population: 9,668
- OS grid reference: SK608090
- Civil parish: Thurmaston
- District: Charnwood
- Shire county: Leicestershire
- Region: East Midlands
- Country: England
- Sovereign state: United Kingdom
- Post town: LEICESTER
- Postcode district: LE4
- Dialling code: 0116
- Police: Leicestershire
- Fire: Leicestershire
- Ambulance: East Midlands
- UK Parliament: Melton and Syston

Thurmaston (/ˈθɜːməs.tən/; THUR-məs-tən) is a village and civil parish in Leicestershire, England, located within the Borough of Charnwood. At the 2011 census, it had a population of 9,668.

It is situated four miles north of the city centre of Leicester and lies just outside the A563, Leicester's outer ring road.

== History and geography ==
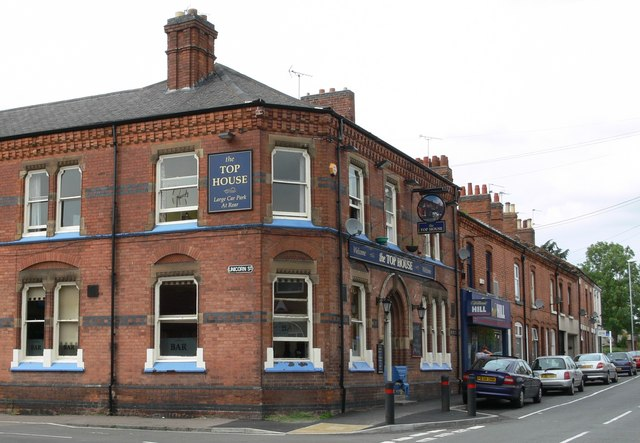
The Top House pub on Melton Road

Thurmaston is bounded to the west by Watermead Country Park (which faces onto Birstall), to the north by Syston and to the east by Barkby and Barkby Thorpe. South of Thurmaston is Rushey Mead and the boundaries of the Leicester urban area.

Rushey Mead was formerly part of the Thurmaston parish in the 19th century, before becoming a Thurmaston Urban District in 1894. In 1935, the district was annexed to the city of Leicester where it took its modern-day name of Rushey Mead.

Thurmaston is split in two by the A607 dual carriageway, which by-passes the main village. To the east of the road is the mostly residential, newer part of Thurmaston. To the west is the main village on Melton Road, which stands on the old Fosse Way, the historic road built by the Romans. Thurmaston lies on the eastern banks of the River Soar, and two marinas are located there, one of which is also a boat-yard, and numerous mooring sites. These lead to the Watermead Country Park which is a purpose-built nature reserve.

The Midland Main Line also runs through the eastern half of the village.

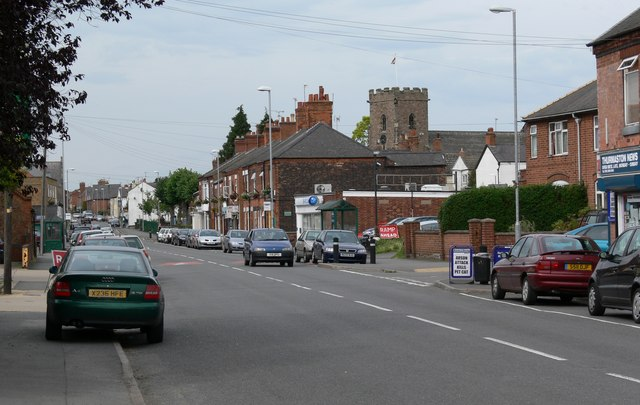
Melton Road, Thurmaston

Taylorcraft Aeroplanes Ltd., a subsidiary based in Thurmaston, developed the Taylorcraft Model 'D' and the Auster Mk. I through Mk. V, which became the backbone aircraft of the British A.O.P.

The local football team, the Thurmaston Magpies, once boasted former England international striker/defender Dion Dublin in its ranks.

The Thurmaston depot and headquarters of Arriva Midlands are located on Westmoreland Avenue within the village.

== Education ==
Thurmaston contains three Key Stages 1 and 2 primary schools:

- Bishop Ellis Catholic Primary School
- Eastfield Primary School
- Church Hill Infant School and Church Hill C of E Junior School

It also contains a Key Stage 3 secondary school, The Roundhill Academy, which takes in students from all the aforementioned schools in the village, as well as schools in the neighbouring town of Syston.

== Facilities ==
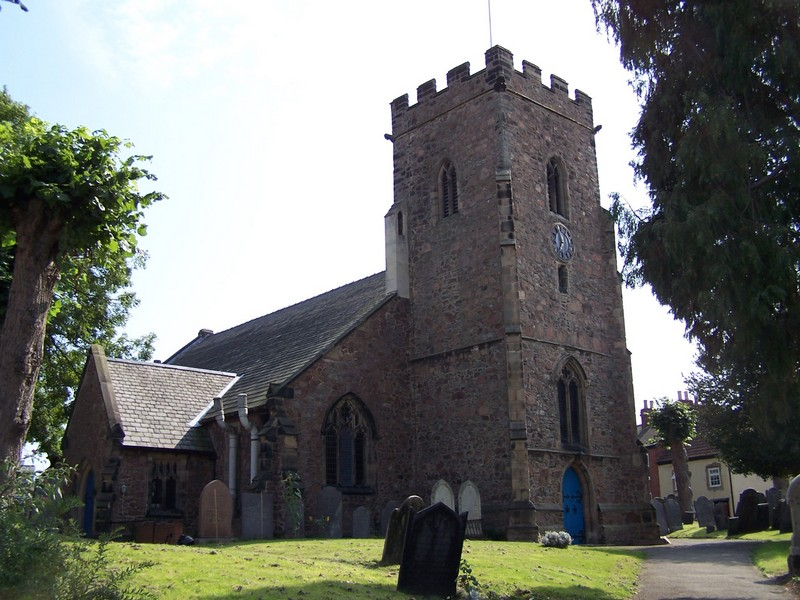
St Michael’s & All Angels’ Church

Thurmaston's prominent location on the edge of Leicester has seen much development in recent years. On 31 March 2003, a large Asda superstore opened on Barkby Thorpe Lane, pushing the nearby Midlands Co-op superstore out of business. The Thurmaston Shopping Centre, featuring a number of retail outlets and restaurants, was built on the site of the old Co-op superstore in 2005. Part of the shopping centre was devastated by fire in June 2026, following which Marks & Spencer confirmed it would not rebuild its foodstore and instead permanently close.

In 2012 following the redevelopment of the North Thurmaston Industrial Estate Costco opened a wholesale store in Thurmaston called Costco Leicester also on the site other smaller stores as well as a Wickes has been constructed on the site.

The main village stretch, along Melton Road, has several pubs, takeaway food outlets, convenience stores and various other small retail establishments. The head offices of Arriva Midlands are also located in the village, along with Arriva's Thurmaston depot where the majority of their buses and drivers that operate in Leicester are based.

As well as many other industrial sites along Melton Road, Thurmaston also contains the Earls Way Industrial Estate in the eastern half of the village.

The village has its own newspaper, The Thurmaston Times which is published bi-monthly. The village has a local history society, Thurmaston Heritage Group, whose members help promote an interest in different aspects of both past and present village life. One particular activity being pursued by a member of the group is the creation of an online virtual war memorial. The Thurmaston Military Indexes are being compiled to provide a listing of all those from the village who served their country in the Great War of 1914-1918 and the 1939-1945 War.

The village also has its own community centre, Elizabeth Park Sports and Community Centre, which has become a popular wedding venue and also offers a range of sports and facilities including badminton and a state of the art 3G football pitch. The facility was built in 1996, and is home to Thurmaston Parish Council Offices. Elizabeth Park is also host to many of the local communities sports teams, such as Thurmaston DPC FC, Thurmaston Magpies FC and Thurmaston Bowls club.

=== Landmarks ===
Thurmaston has numerous landmarks; these range from local oddities, the most famous of which is the Church Hill Road Bridge which is notorious for its flooding, to interesting historical titbits including a statue of William Lane, a British soldier tragically murdered in the village. A portion of the west wall from St John the Evangelist Church survived a partial demolition of the building in the late 1600s.

=== Public transport ===
Thurmaston is served by a number of bus companies including Arriva Midlands, First Leicester and Centrebus with multiple stops up and down the main village and on the duel carriageway. The nearest railway station is in Syston. Charnwood borough council's local transport plan from 2004 proposed new railway stations to be opened at Thurmaston and East Goscote. This has since been cancelled and removed from the local plan.

== Twin towns ==
- Offranville, Upper Normandy, France
