= Borough of Charnwood =

Coordinates: 52.769°N 1.204°W

Charnwood
- Borough and non-metropolitan district
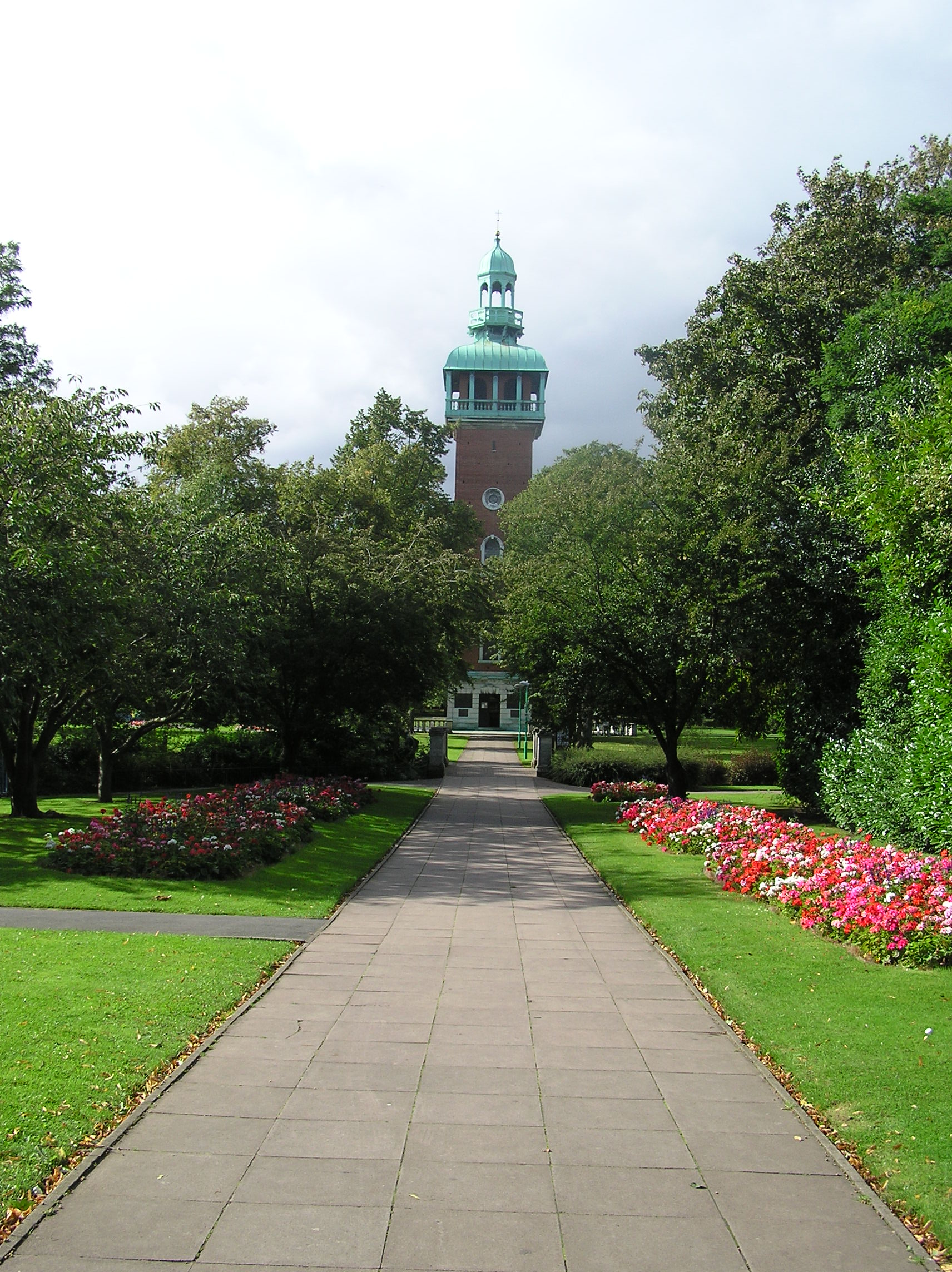
- Loughborough Carillon

- Shown within Leicestershire
- Sovereign state: United Kingdom
- Constituent country: England
- Region: East Midlands
- Administrative county: Leicestershire
- Admin. HQ: Loughborough

Government
  - Type: Charnwood Borough Council
  - MPs: Edward Argar (Con, Melton and Syston); Jeevun Sandher (Lab, Loughborough)

Area
  - Total: 108 sq mi (279 km^{2})
  - Rank: 127th

Population (2024)
  - Total: 188,385
  - Rank: Ranked 114th
  - Density: 1,750/sq mi (675/km^{2})

Ethnicity (2021)
  - Ethnic groups: List: 82.3% White; 12.4% Asian; 2.5% Mixed; 1.5% Black; 1.3% other

Religion (2021)
  - Religion: List: 44.1% Christianity; 43.3% no religion; 9.3% other; 3.3% Islam
- Time zone: UTC+0 (Greenwich Mean Time)
  - Summer (DST): UTC+1 (British Summer Time)
- ONS code: 31UC (ONS); E07000130 (GSS)

Charnwood is a local government district with borough status in the north of Leicestershire, England. It is named after Charnwood Forest, much of which lies within the borough. Towns in the borough include Loughborough (where the council is based), Shepshed and Syston. Villages in the borough include Barrow upon Soar, Birstall, Hathern, Mountsorrel, Quorn, Rothley, Sileby and Woodhouse Eaves, Wanlip and Broadnook.

The neighbouring districts are Melton, Harborough, Leicester, Blaby, Hinckley and Bosworth, North West Leicestershire and Rushcliffe.

== History ==
The district was created on 1 April 1974 under the Local Government Act 1972, covering the area of three former districts, which were all abolished at the same time:

- Barrow upon Soar Rural District
- Loughborough Municipal Borough
- Shepshed Urban District

Prior to the new district coming into being there was some debate as to what name it should take, with alternatives considered including "Loughborough and Soar Valley", "Greater Loughborough" and "Soar Valley". A committee of the three outgoing councils chose Soar Valley as its preferred option but was overruled by the government, which went instead for the committee's second choice of Charnwood, after the Charnwood Forest which covers the western part of the district. The new district was awarded borough status from its creation, allowing the chair of the council to take the title of mayor.

The symbol of Charnwood Borough Council is the fox, which is also the symbol used by Leicestershire County Council. Charnwood contains the village of Quorn, which gives its name to one of the country's oldest fox hunting packs, the Quorn Hunt, which was established in 1696 and moved to Quorn in 1753.

== Abolition ==
Under current local government reform plans, the district will be abolished in 2028 with its area being split between an enlarged Leicester unitary authority and a Leicestershire and Rutland unitary.

== Governance ==
Charnwood Borough Council provides district-level services. County-level services are provided by Leicestershire County Council. Much of the borough is also covered by civil parishes, which form a third tier of local government.

== Geography ==
To the south it borders the City of Leicester, about 20 km away from Loughborough. There is a moderately urbanised A6 corridor between the two population centres and close to the River Soar, including Quorn, Barrow-on-Soar, Mountsorrel, Birstall, Sileby, Thurmaston, Syston, Queniborough and East Goscote.

To the south of the borough, Birstall, Queniborough, Thurmaston and Syston form part of the Leicester Urban Area, while Quorn and Shepshed (the second-largest town in the district), amongst others, might be considered to be part of a Loughborough urban agglomeration.

The highest point is Beacon Hill (248m/814 ft) to the north of the Charnwood Forest 'area of natural beauty' extending WN-west into the National Forest.

== Demography ==
Charnwood is the largest borough by population in Leicestershire, and has the largest school population as well.

Population growth in Charnwood
Year	1951	1961	1971	1981	1991	2001	2011	2021	2031
Population	89,980	103,282	127,046	132,170	141,759	153,428	166,100	183,971	207,000
Census								Nomis	ONS Projections

== Media ==
The area is served by BBC East Midlands and ITV Central with television signals received from the Waltham transmitter.

Radio stations for the area are:

- BBC Radio Leicester
- Smooth East Midlands
- Capital Midlands
- Community based stations: Fosse FM and Carillon Radio,

== Parishes ==
Most of the borough is covered by civil parishes. Most of the pre-1974 borough of Loughborough is an unparished area. The parish councils for Shepshed and Syston have declared their parishes to be towns, allowing them to take the style "town council". The parishes of Barkby and Barkby Thorpe share a grouped parish council, as do Burton on the Wolds, Cotes and Prestwold. The small parishes of Beeby, Hamilton Lea, Stonebow Village, Swithland, Ulverscroft and Wanlip have a parish meeting rather than a parish council.

- Anstey
- Barkby
- Barkby Thorpe
- Barrow upon Soar
- Beeby
- Birstall
- Burton on the Wolds
- Cossington
- Cotes
- East Goscote
- Hamilton Lea
- Hathern
- Hoton
- Mountsorrel
- Newtown Linford
- Prestwold
- Queniborough
- Quorn
- Ratcliffe on the Wreake
- Rearsby
- Rothley
- Seagrave
- Shepshed
- Sileby
- South Croxton
- Stonebow Village
- Swithland
- Syston
- Thrussington
- Thurcaston and Cropston
- Thurmaston
- Ulverscroft
- Walton on the Wolds
- Wanlip
- Woodhouse
- Wymeswold

== Freedom of the Borough ==
The following people, military units, and organisations and groups have received the Freedom of the Borough of Charnwood.

=== Individuals ===
- Paula Radcliffe: 28 June 2004.
- Michael Jones: 29 September 2008.
- Lez Cope-Newman: 24 June 2019.

=== Military Units ===
- 2nd Battalion The Royal Anglian Regiment: 4 September 2006.
- 203 (Loughborough) Squadron The 158 (Royal Anglian) Transport Regiment: 15 April 2010.
- The Royal Logistic Corps: April 2010.

=== Organisations and Groups ===
- Leicester City Football Club: 14 September 2021.
