= All Saints Church, Beeby =

Coordinates: 52.6686°N 1.0194°W

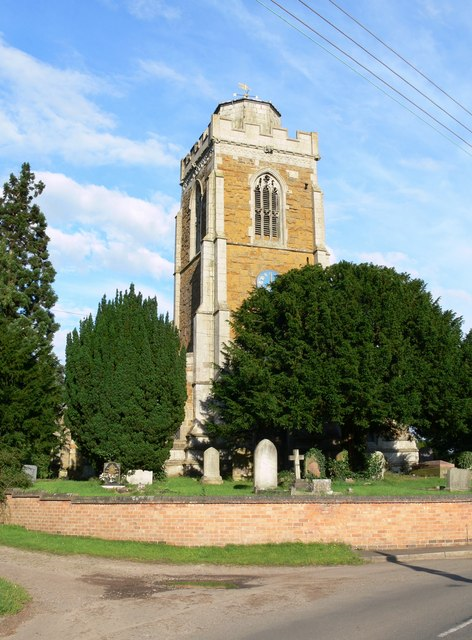
- Tower of All Saints Church, Beeby

- Location in Leicestershire
- OS grid reference: SK 664 083
- Location: Beeby, Leicestershire
- Country: England
- Denomination: Anglican
- Website: Churches Conservation Trust

History
- Dedication: All Saints

Architecture
- Functional status: Redundant
- Heritage designation: Grade II*
- Designated: 1 June 1966
- Architectural type: Church
- Style: Gothic
- Groundbreaking: Early 14th century
- Completed: 19th century

Specifications
- Materials: Orange ironstone nave and tower with white ashlar dressings Brick chancel with red sandstone dressings Granite and timber porch

All Saints Church is a redundant Anglican church in the village of Beeby, Leicestershire, England. It is recorded in the National Heritage List for England as a designated Grade II* listed building, and is under the care of the Churches Conservation Trust.

== History ==
Most of the church dates from the early 14th century. In the 15th century the tower was added. The chancel was rebuilt in 1819, and the south porch was added in the 19th century.

== Architecture ==
=== Exterior ===
The body of the church and the tower are constructed in orange ironstone with white ashlar dressings, the chancel is in brick with red sandstone dressings, and the south porch is in granite and timber. Its plan consists of a nave with a clerestory and north and south aisles, a chancel, and a west tower. The tower is in three stages with angle buttresses. In the lowest stage is a west door over which is a two-light window. The middle stage has a clock face on the west side. On each side of the top stage is a three-light bell opening. At the top of the tower is a frieze decorated with quatrefoils, and an embattled parapet with gargoyles. On the summit of the tower is a truncated spire. On the south side of the church is the porch and two windows. Along the clerestory on both sides are windows in pairs. On the east gable of the chancel is a stone with the date 1819. The north wall contains a doorway and two three-light windows with Decorated tracery. Both outside and inside the church are large corbels carved with a variety of images, including a serpent, a skull, the Crucifixion, and saints.

=== Interior ===
The arcade is in three bays carried on octagonal piers. Three steps lead up from the nave to the chancel. To the north of the chancel arch is a door that formerly led to the rood loft. The chancel screen dates mainly from the medieval period, and there is also some medieval material in the south aisle screen. The pulpit is in stone and marble and dates from about 1860. Over the tower arch are Royal arms, and in the south aisle is a Commandments board. The font dates probably from the 13th century. It consists of a small basin carried on four round shafts. The basin is in the form of a slightly curved square, and contains a floral carving in each panel. Also in the church are late 18th-century box pews. The single-manual organ was built in about 1925 by J. Porritt. There is a ring of three bells. One of these was cast in about 1400 by Johannes de Stafford, the other two are undated and the founders are not known.

== See also ==
- List of churches preserved by the Churches Conservation Trust in the English Midlands
