= James Kerridge =

Architect

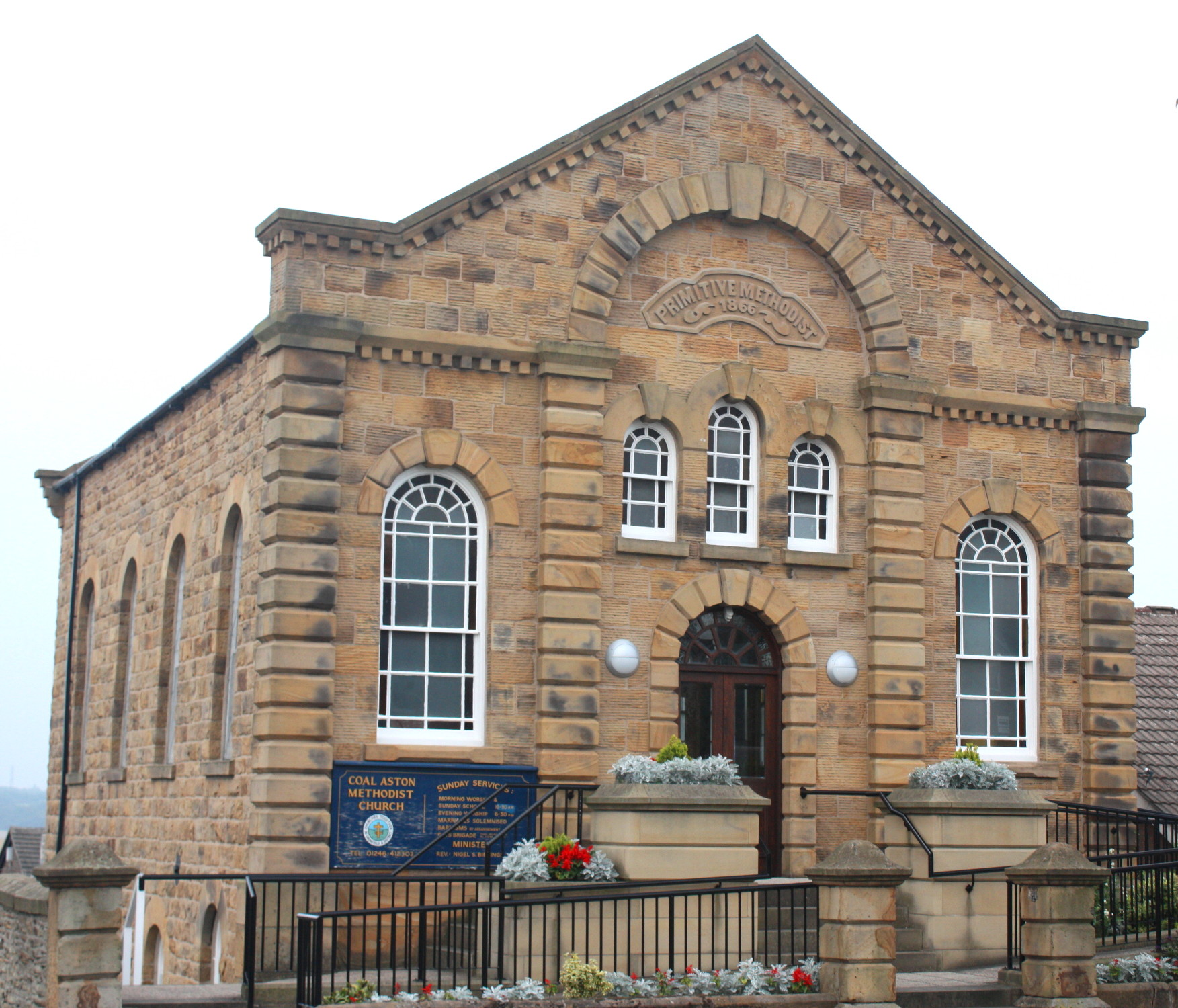
Coal Aston Primitive Methodist Church 1866

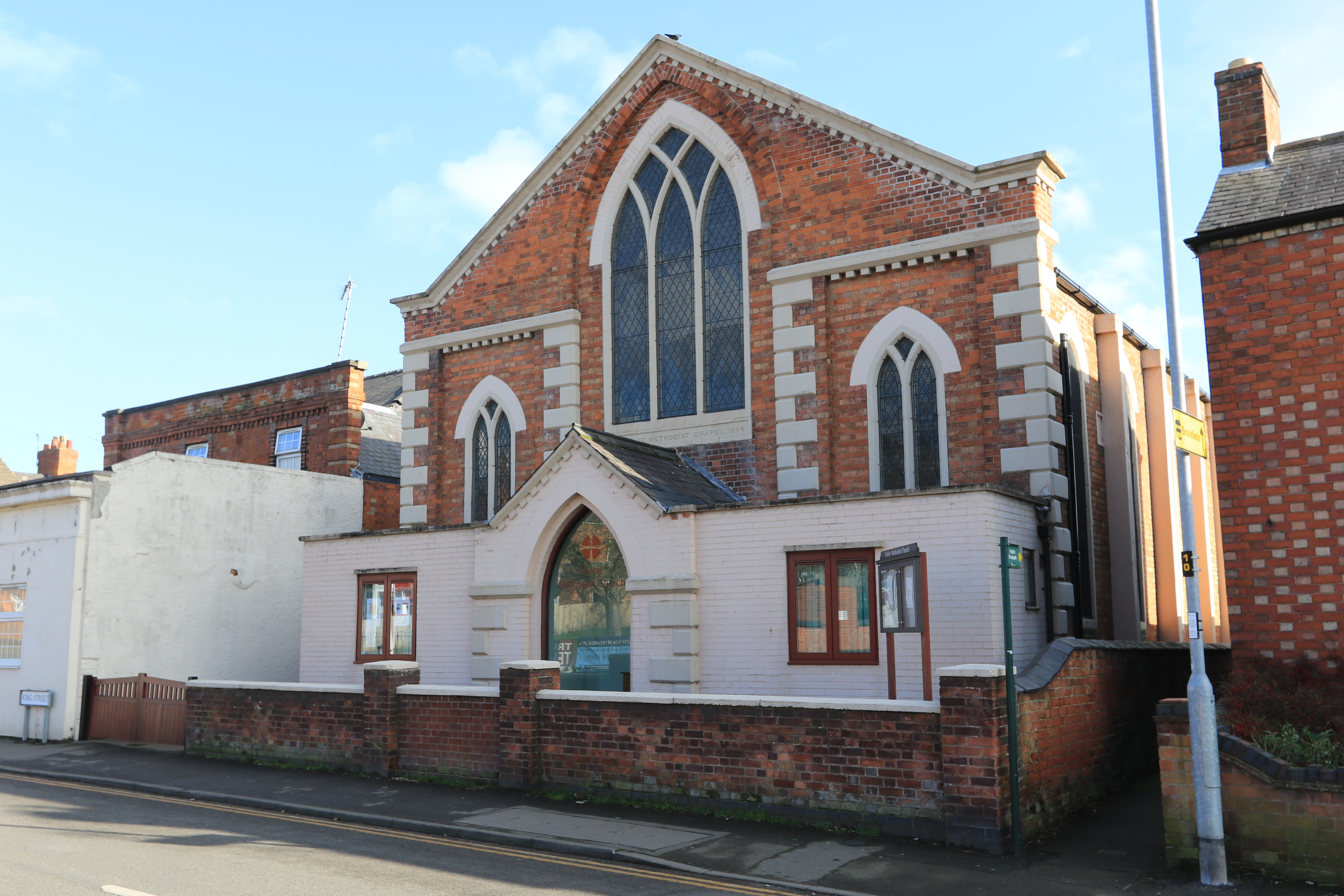
Sileby Primitive Methodist Church 1866

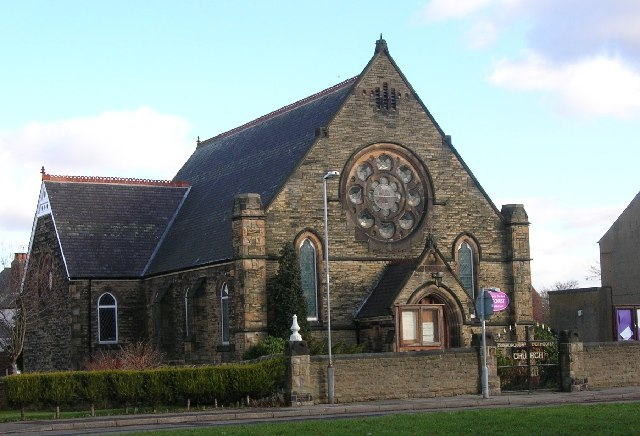
Mosborough Primitive Methodist Church 1869

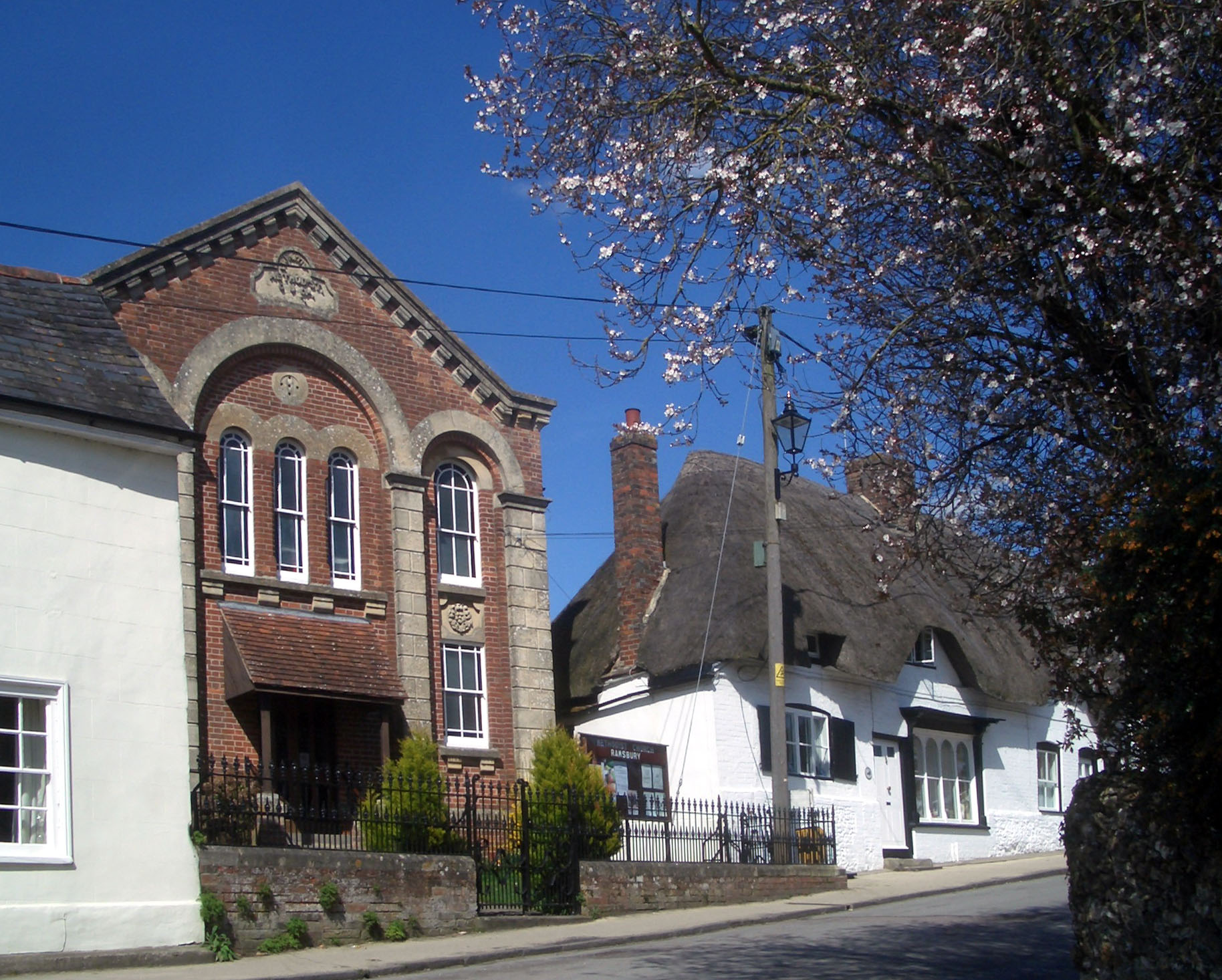
Ramsbury Primitive Methodist Church 1876-77

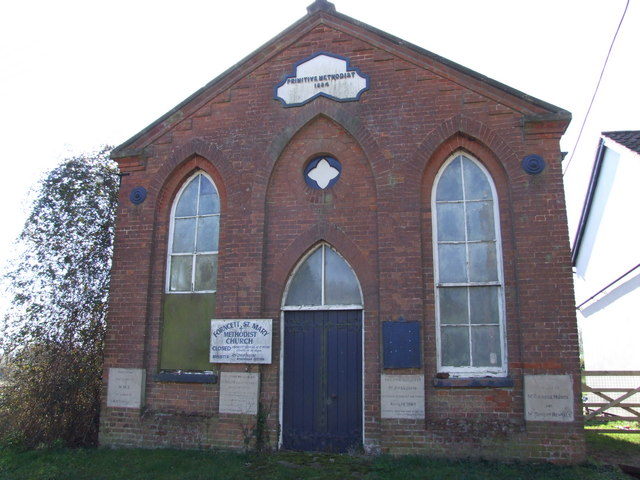
Forncett St Mary Primitive Methodist Church 1883-84

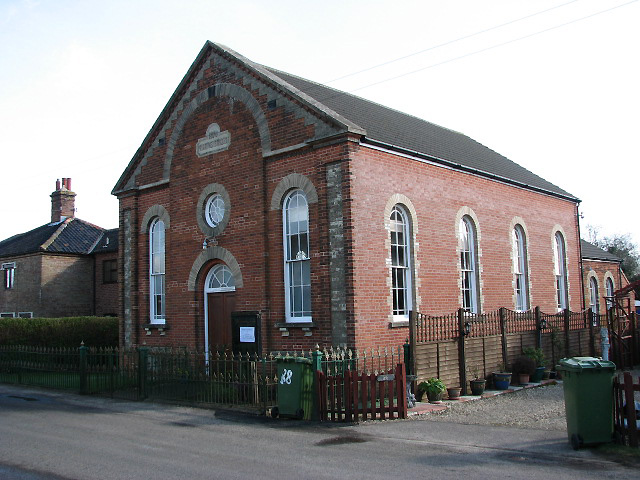
Ashill Primitive Methodist Church 1893

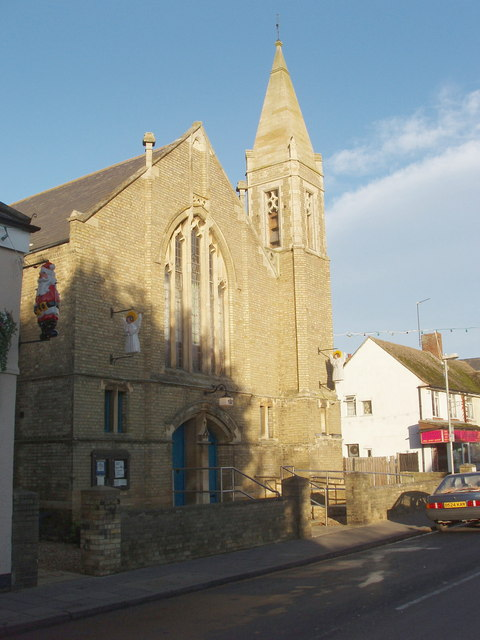
Ramsey Primitive Methodist Church 1898

James Kerridge (4 August 1830 – 28 March 1911) was a British architect based in Wisbech, Cambridgeshire.

== Personal life ==
James Kerridge was born on 4 August 1830 in Bungay, Suffolk, the son of William Kerridge (b. 1806), a farmer, and Hannah Webster (b. 1808), and was baptised aged four on 28 July 1835 in Bungay.

He trained as an architect under C. Weekes of Carmarthen.

He married first Mary Ann Frances Watford (1836–1857) on 23 July 1854 in St Clement Danes. They had two children:

- Revd. William Kerridge (1855–1928)
- Catherine Eliza Kerridge (b. 1857)

Mary Ann Frances died in Wisbech and was buried on 20 February 1857. He married secondly Mary Hill (1839–1914) on 14 December 1858 in Wisbech. They had the following children:

- James Kerridge (1860 – 12 April 1877)
- Mary Ann Frances Kerridge (1862–1938)
- John H Kerridge (1864–1865)
- Richard Cobden Kerridge (1866 – 6 April 1877)
- Hannah Elizabeth Kerridge (b. 1868)
- John Mason Kerridge (1870 – 1878)
- Francis Kerridge (b. 1871)
- Ellen Maria Kerridge (b. 1873)
- Catherine Eliza Kerridge (b. 1875)
- Florence Kane Kerridge (b. 1876)
- Thomas Mallitt Kerridge (b. 1879)
- Lucy Priscilli Kerridge (b. 1880)
- Gertrude Mabel Kerridge (b. 1882)

He died on 28 March 1911 and was buried in Wisbech General Cemetery.

== Works ==
- Primitive Methodist Church, Somerby, Leicestershire, 1863
- Primitive Methodist Church, Sileby, Leicestershire, 1866
- Primitive Methodist Chapel, Coal Aston, Derbyshire, 1866
- Primitive Methodist Chapel, Mosborough, South Yorkshire, 1869
- Primitive Methodist Chapel, John Street, Highfield, Sheffield, 1869
- Free Methodist Chapel, Wisbech, 1870 (enlargement)
- Primitive Methodist Chapel, Haverhill, Suffolk, 1874
- Primitive Methodist Church, Stroud Green, 1874
- Primitive Methodist Church, New Street, Halsted, Essex, 1875
- Primitive Methodist Church, Parkgate, Sheffield, 1875
- Primitive Methodist Chapel, Gillingham, Dorset, 1875–76
- Primitive Methodist Chapel, Ramsbury, Wiltshire, 1876–77
- Primitive Methodist Chapel, Charley Way, Shepshed, 1877–78
- Primitive Methodist Church, Alcombe Road, Northampton, 1879
- Primitive Methodist Chapel, Mansfield Road, Hasland, Chesterfield, Derbyshire, 1880–81
- Primitive Methodist Chapel, Chapel Street, Rawmarsh, 1881
- Primitive Methodist Chapel, Forncett St Mary, Norfolk, 1883–84
- Littleport Public Hall, 1888-89
- Primitive Methodist Chapel, Ashill, Norfolk, 1893
- Primitive Methodist Chapel, London Road, Mount Tabor, Luton, Bedfordshire, 1898
- Primitive Methodist Chapel, Ramsey, Cambridgeshire 1898
- Primitive Methodist Chapel, Hinckley Road, Leicester, Leicestershire, 1899
- Primitive Methodist Chapel, Mattishall, Norfolk, 1900
