= Beeby =

Village and civil parish in the Charnwood district of Leicestershire, England

Coordinates: 52.669°N 1.020°W

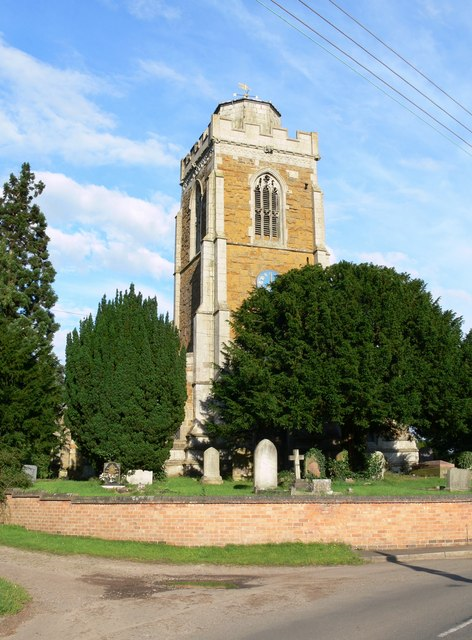
- All Saints Church, Beeby

- Location within Leicestershire
- Population: 115
- OS grid reference: SK6626408298
- District: Charnwood
- Shire county: Leicestershire
- Region: East Midlands
- Country: England
- Sovereign state: United Kingdom
- Post town: Leicester
- Postcode district: LE7
- Dialling code: 0116
- Police: Leicestershire
- Fire: Leicestershire
- Ambulance: East Midlands
- UK Parliament: Melton and Syston

Beeby is a village and civil parish in the Charnwood district of Leicestershire, England, with a population of 115 according to the 2011 census. It is situated north-east of Leicester, nearer to the villages of Keyham and Hungarton in the neighbouring district of Harborough and lies along the Barkby Brook. This small rural hamlet can be succinctly described as "a series of scattered houses that remain of the shrunken medieval village". The parish also includes the hamlet of Little Beeby, which consists of several houses within the settlement and is located 200m south east of the All Saints Church.

== History ==
The villages name is of Anglo-Saxon origin. In the Domesday Book of 1086, the place name was recorded as "Bebi" and derives from the Old English pre-7th Century "beo", meaning bee, plus the Old Norse "byr", a settlement or village; hence, "bee settlement".

In the 1870s John Marius Wilson described Beeby in the Imperial Gazetteer of England and Wales as:

"a parish in Barrow-upon-Soar district, Leicester; on an affluent of the river Wreak, 4 miles SE of Syston r. station, and 5½ NE of Leicester. Post Town, Hungarton, under Leicester. Acres, 1,020. Real property, £2,620. Pop., 119. Houses, 26. The property is divided among a few. Beeby House is a chief residence. The living is a rectory in the diocese of Peterborough. Value, £282.* Patron, Earl Shaftesbury. The church is good."

The Parish registers of Beeby commence in 1540, one of the oldest in the county. There was no mention, however, of the name Beeby in the register, as at this time you would only adopt the name 'Beeby' if you were a property or land owner.

Many of the buildings in the village date back to the eighteenth and nineteenth century, mostly designed with Georgian and Victorian periods of architecture indicated by its structure materials. There is no known ancient architectural potential in Beeby, however, within the fields surrounding the conservation area there is underlying archaeological interest where there is evidence of a larger medieval settlement. According to a census report in 1801 there were 25 houses in Beeby, which has risen by only 3 in the following 200 years. At present, many of the 28 buildings in Beeby are grade listed and sell between the prices of £150,000 for small cottages up to £700,000 for the Georgian and Victorian country houses. The village of Beeby is referenced in Adrian Mole and the Weapons of Mass Destruction as the home of the Flowers family.

== Demographics ==
=== Population ===
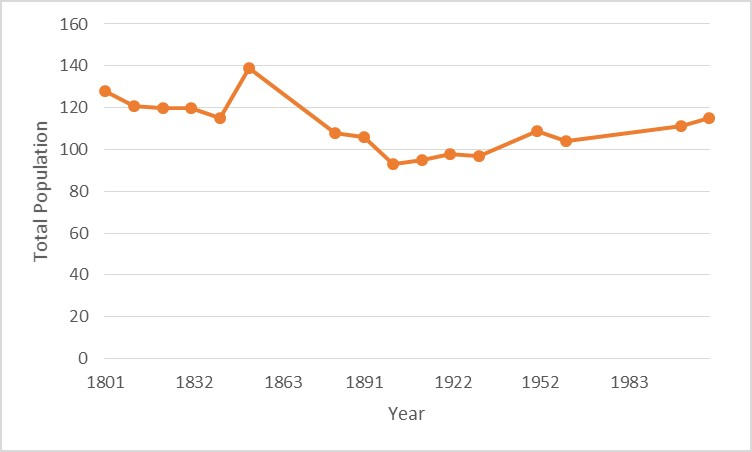
Total Population of Beeby Civil Parish, Leicestershire, as reported by the Census of Population from 1881 to 2011

The population of Beeby has always been very small and has changed very little since the Domesday survey in 1098. According to a population census in 1801 it was home to 124 people which rose to 139 in 1851 (the highest recorded since the first population census). This number then fell to 95 in 1991 (the lowest recorded). Population records date back to the 14th century to show there were 96 inhabitants at the time of the Poll Tax in 1377 and a population of 86 at the time of the Ecclesiastical census in 1676. At present Beeby has a population of 115 (60 males and 55 females) 16 of which are children.

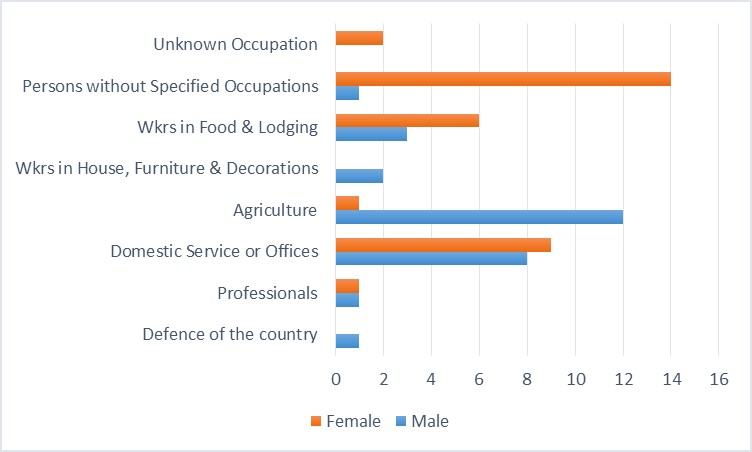
Occupational employment for Beeby, Leicestershire, as reported by the 1881 census report

=== Occupational statistics ===
The Domesday book census taken in 1086 indicates that there were 21 villains ('peasants', bound to the Lord of the Manor), 5 Sokemen (freemen enjoying extensive rights over land) and 2 servants. The first census in 1801 simply divided people into those involved in agriculture and those in trade and manufacturing. It was only in the 1841 census that first gathered occupational data. According to occupation data reports published in 1881, of Beeby's 108 inhabitants, the majority of males worked in agriculture and females in domestic service. The children of this parish would have attended school in Barkby's Public Elementary School, about 2 miles to the west of Beeby and still do in the present day. Many of Beeby's residents at present work in agriculture and retail, commuting to Leicester for work. The nearest train stations to Beeby are Syston (3.19 miles away) or Leicester (5.09 miles away).

== Geography ==
=== Topography ===
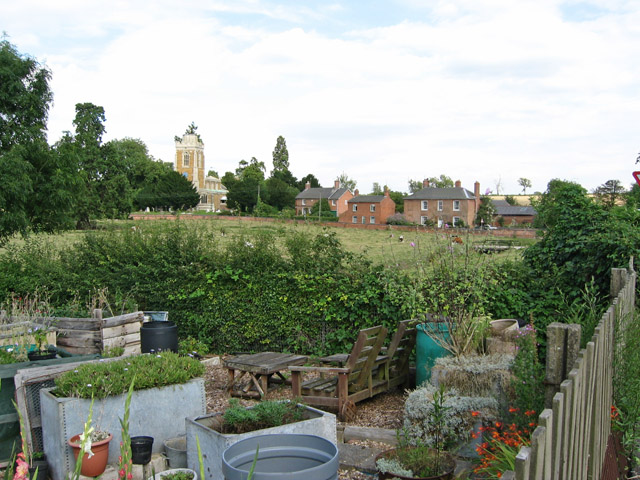
Beeby, Leicestershire

The physical and historical development of the hamlet has been strongly influenced by the local topography and its relative isolation. Beeby is situated within an established agricultural landscape largely in pastoral use. Until 1904 the east-west route was the only route through the hamlet, which was referred to as the Main Road or Barkby Road, connecting the village to Barkby (neighbouring village) and South Croxton. The other roads that now run through Beeby are Hungarton Road, situated to the east and Scraptoft Road, to the south giving the village a more direct link to the outskirts of Leicester. This isolation has mitigated the villages growth over time. This as well as several clusters of cottages and Brewery cottages mixed with informal and open grouping of farmhouses and their associating buildings are features which give this isolated village its character and appeal.

=== Conservation Area ===
The Conservation Area was designated in September 1975 and it covers an area of around 6.4 ha (15.8 acres) of gradually sloping land either side of a small tributary stream to the Barkby Brook. This extends along the Main Street and to Barkby Road and essentially relates to the physical extent of the settlement as it was at the end of the nineteenth century. The conservation area is protected by the Regional Spatial Strategy for the East Midlands (RSS) which advises local authorities to develop strategies that avoid damage to the region's cultural assets.

== Historic sites and landmarks ==
All Saints Church: The Anglican parish church is dedicated to All Saints and seats 100 people. It stands alone looking over parkland within the village. It was built with orange ironstone in the fourteenth century with the interior featuring a thirteenth century font and decorated with carvings that date throughout the churches history. The tower was added to the building in the fifteenth century. The church has a truncated steeple (often referred to as the 'Beeby Tub'), unfinished due to the legend of two stonemasons quarrelling and falling to their death. The churches slightly raised setting ensures that it is the focal point for views from all directions across the valley.

The Manor House, Beeby: A grade II listed building dating back to the late 18th century, located on the west side of the main street.
