= Swithland Reservoir =

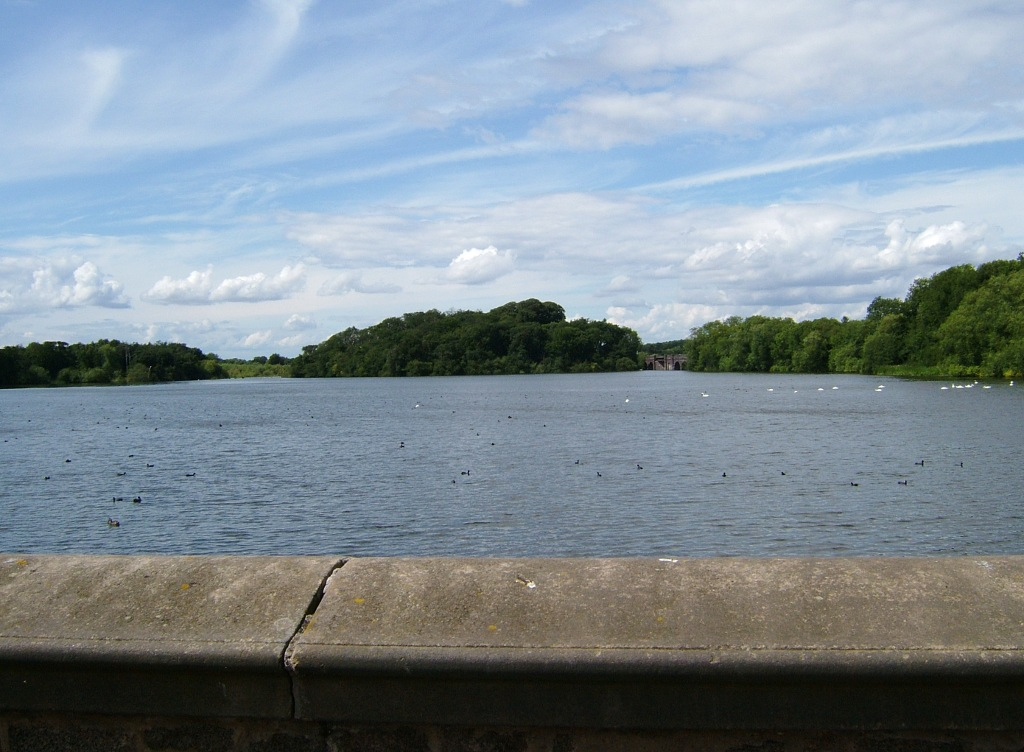
- View from the causeway at the southern end, with Brazil Island in the centre and the railway viaduct to the right.

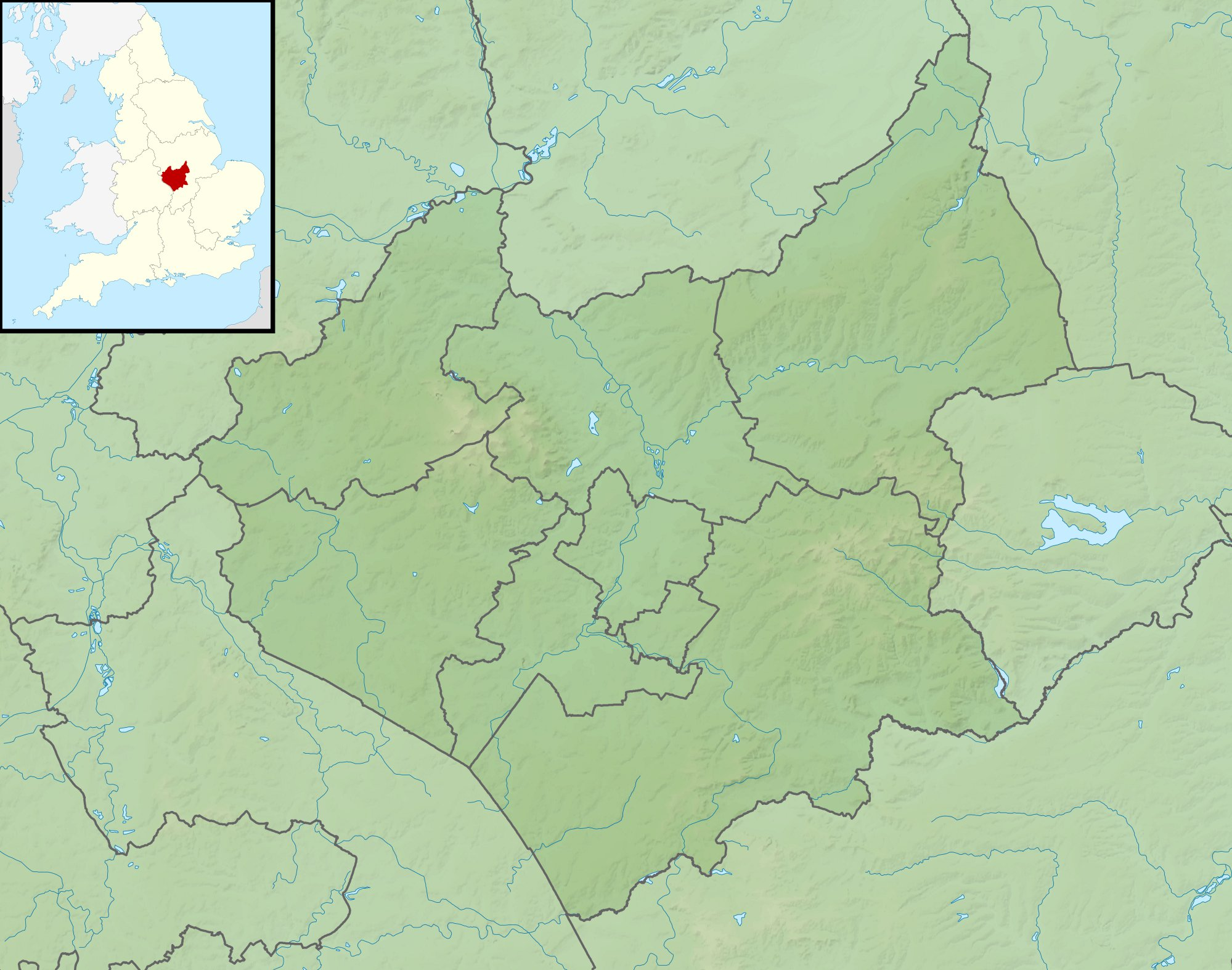
- Location within Leicestershire
- Location: Leicestershire
- Coordinates: 52°43′20″N 1°10′25″W
- Type: Reservoir
- Primary inflows: Lingdale Brook, Swithland Brook, Hallgates Brook, Bradgate Brook
- Primary outflows: Buddon Brook
- Basin countries: United Kingdom
- Water volume: 600 million imperial gallons (2,200 acre⋅ft)
- Settlements: Swithland

Swithland Reservoir is a reservoir in the English county of Leicestershire. It is north-east of the village of Swithland from which it takes its name, north-west of Rothley and approximately 133 metres (145 yd) south-west of Mountsorrel Quarry. It is part of the 187.1-hectare (462-acre) Buddon Wood and Swithland Reservoir Site of Special Scientific Interest (SSSI).

== History ==
Leicester's rapidly growing population in the latter half of the 19th century required the construction of a series of reservoirs. In 1854 Thornton Reservoir was opened, serving a population of 61,000. By 1861 the population had increased, with the Leicester Waterworks Company now directly supplying 24,000 people, and five years later the company was supplying between 60 and 70,000 people and work began on Bradgate Reservoir (now known as Cropston Reservoir). By 1878 the "water population" had increased to 110,000 and by 1893 to 203,000, requiring further reservoirs to be constructed.

In 1890 Leicester City Council sought parliamentary authority to acquire the land required to construct Swithland reservoir, which would be supplied from Lingdale Brook, Swithland Brook, Hallgates Brook, and Bradgate Brook, and construction commenced in 1894, with completion in 1896; The works including the holding reservoir and new pumping engines together with the engine and boiler houses at the Cropston station, were designed by John Breedon Everard of Pick Everard. The reservoir opened on 10 September in that year. The reservoir was constructed by Messrs. John Aird & Sons of London, who submitted a successful £133,511 tender and had a temporary railway extension built from Mountsorrel to assist with transportation of construction materials; This was extended to Hallgates in Cropston, where an additional storage reservoir was constructed, making the length nine miles in total. The Swithland Reservoir was also a former water works used to treat water.

== Site and location ==
The site of the reservoir was a wooded valley between six villages. Four of them have parts of their parish covered by it, namely Swithland, Rothley, Woodhouse and Quorn, the other two being Mountsorrel and Woodhouse Eaves. The stream through the valley, which feeds the reservoir, is called Bradgate Brook at the point where it now meets the reservoir. At its outflow it is known as Buddon Brook, and flows north and then west for 2 km (1.4 mi) before joining the River Soar. At its upper reaches, in the hills of Ulverscroft it flows south-east and is called Ulverscroft Brook. At Newtown Linford, where it is known as the River Lin, it turns to the north-east and flows through Bradgate Park and into Cropston Reservoir, after which, as Bradgate Brook it reaches the southern end of Swithland Reservoir. A second stream, known as Swithland Brook, joins the west side of the reservoir having risen beyond Swithland Wood, through which it flows, and continues eastward through Swithland village.

The road from Swithland was diverted due to the reservoir's construction and a bridge constructed at the South end. Construction of the reservoir necessitated the removal of 5,800 trees and nine miles of hedgerow. The dam is at the north end and is crossed by Kinchley Lane. An island known as Brazil Island (the part of Brazil Wood left above water level after flooding) is located south of the centre of the reservoir, with a weir on either side. Brazil Island was the site of a game preserve until it was destroyed by fire in 1938.

=== Pre-reservoir landscape ===
In the Domesday Book of 1086 the whole of the Charnwood area was recorded as uninhabited and uncultivated 'waste', extending in the east almost to the River Soar. Neither Quorn nor Swithland receive an entry, and the Buddon brook valley, along with much of eastern Charnwood, fell within the Manor of Barrow. In the centuries that followed the arrival of Norman lords, some eleven deer parks were established around Charnwood Forest, by the various manorial lords. Barrow Park is first documented in 1135. An almost circular park with Buddon Brook running north-south through its middle. Substantial banks and ditches enclosed an area intended to preserve deer for hunting, and would also have provided timber and other resources of a medieval manor. The northern half of the reservoir lies within Barrow Park, as does the whole of Buddon Wood, and the bank and ditch remain well preserved both around the south-eastern edge of the wood and within the silt of the reservoir floor, as was seen when it was drained in 1976. Also visible in the silt is a moated medieval park-keeper's house site, with several fishponds alongside. Unusually for a medieval manor, its history hinged on four sisters, who each inherited a part of Barrow Manor when their father Roger de Sumery died in 1273. Amongst the parcels of land each daughter inherited was a part of Barrow Park, or as it was becoming known, Quorndon Park, as the newer settlement grew up along the park's northern boundary.

With each of the daughters married to landowners elsewhere, the park and other lands in Barrow were sold and exchanged in small parcels, but by the fourteenth century were mainly split between two big landowners, the Despenser and Erdington Families. With the disgrace and execution of Hugh Despenser in 1326, his estates, now part of the manor of Beaumanor, passed to the Beaumonts. The Erdington line died out in 1467, and having reverted to the crown was added to William Hastings' vast Leicestershire land holdings until his execution in 1483. The manor of Barrow remained with the Hastings family until 1840, but much of the individual land holdings were sold off piecemeal, and it was only in the 18th century that Buddon Wood returned to a single owner when Joseph Danvers was able to consolidate the various parts.

Although the park had not been managed as a single unit, its boundaries continued to influence land use and local administration. Substantial sections of the park pale still form the Rothley-Quorn parish boundary and similarly set the Woodhouse-Quorn border until recent rationalisations moved it to the railway line. Likewise, the Rushey Fields-Kinchley Lane road, where it ran under the reservoir, tracked the park pale for some 500m.

== Swithland Viaduct ==
Swithland Viaduct
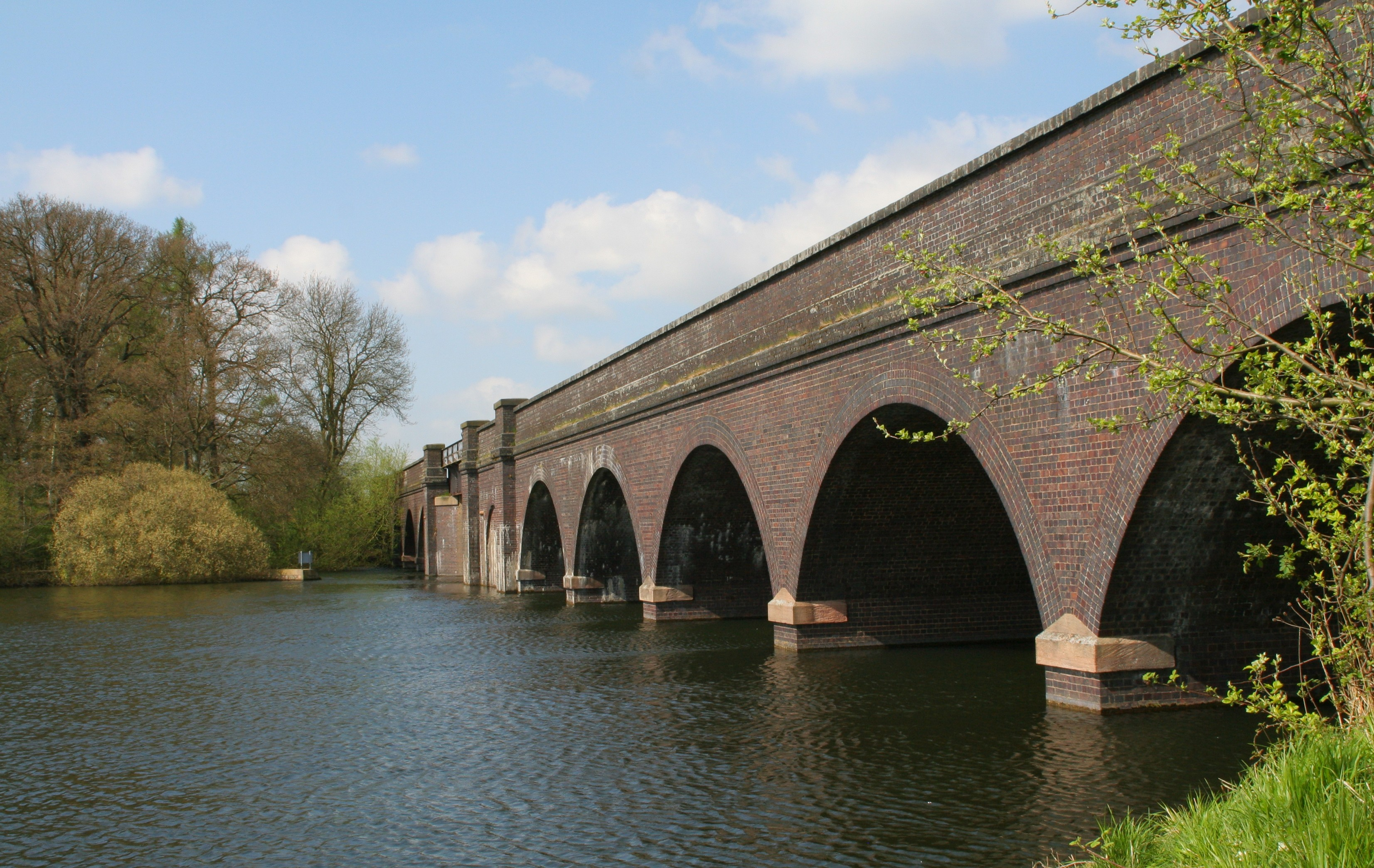
- The South Viaduct of the Swithland Viaduct
- Coordinates: 52°43′20″N 1°10′25″W
- Carries: Great Central Railway
- Crosses: Swithland Reservoir

Characteristics
- Material: Brick

History
- Designer: Mr. Alexander Ross, M. Inst. C.E.
- Constructed by: John Aird & Sons
- Construction end: c.1897

Location
- Interactive map of Swithland Viaduct

Between 1895 and 1897, two viaducts were constructed over the reservoir as part of the Manchester, Sheffield and Lincolnshire Railway's London Extension, crossing via Brazil Island. They are referred to collectively as Swithland Viaduct and were built by John Aird & Sons, as a sub-contract to Henry Lovatt & Co. of Wolverhampton. The reservoir had to be completely drained so that the viaduct could be built. The south viaduct has a skew girder section approximately halfway along its length, this having been provided to bridge the weir which separates the reservoir into two unequal portions.

Today this forms part of the route of the preserved Great Central Railway and sits between Quorn and Woodhouse to the north and Swithland Sidings to the south. The viaduct is locally listed by Charnwood Borough Council. Extensive maintenance work was carried out on the girder span in 2015, in order to replace wasted plates within the girders.

== Water provision ==
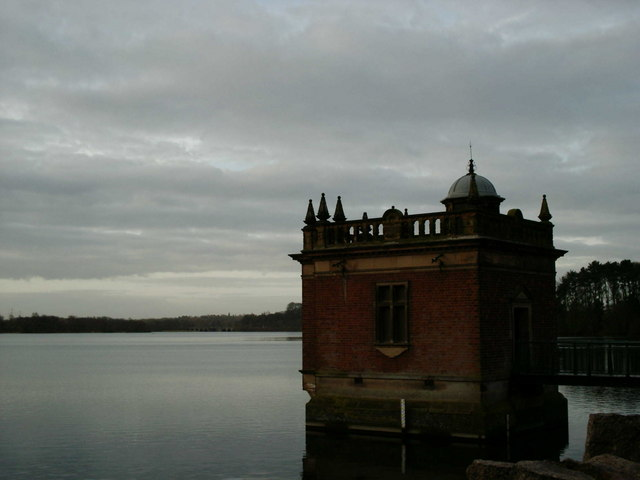
The draw-off tower, alongside the dam

The dam is 404 yards long and is 26 feet wide at the top and 48 feet wide at the base; It was constructed of concrete and water-clay. A draw-off tower, alongside the dam wall originally abstracted water for the six gravity filter beds behind the dam wall, which have a total area of 75,000 square feet, surrounding a clear water tank. Water was pumped from the storage tank to the 2 million gallon capacity Hallgates reservoir, and from there it traveled through a water main to the lower reservoir at Oadby via gravitation. Today raw water from Swithland Reservoir is pumped into nearby Cropston Water Treatment Works before being put into Hallgates Service Reservoir. Several of the buildings at Swithland Reservoir are listed, with much of the pumping station site Grade II listed.

The capacity was initially stated at 600 million gallons (100 million gallons more than was originally envisaged), and was thought sufficient to serve a population of 300,000. Early operation of the reservoir was not without difficulties; While it had been envisaged that it would be sufficient to serve Leicester for 20 years, by 1898 further supply capacity from Derbyshire was needed, and the reservoir was considered by some to have been a failure. In 1909 supply to Leicester was temporarily halted due to "vegetable growth" caused by warm weather.

== Site of Special Scientific Interest (SSSI) ==
The reservoir is part of the Buddon Wood and Swithland Reservoir biological SSSI, and Buddon Hill quarry, which is also designated on geological grounds, is a Geological Conservation Review site. The Mountsorrel granite of Buddon Wood has been such a valuable commodity commercially that it has taken precedence over the wildlife interest of the wood. It is also enigmatic, geologically, both as to its age and the way it formed. As the SSSI citation puts it, if its mysteries could be solved, it 'would provide a key to unravelling the deep crustal structure of Southern Britain about which so little is known at the moment'. The quarry is owned and operated by Tarmac, and a major part of the output is crushed stone for use either as coated stone (eg in roads) or within concrete. Quarrying began in the 1970s and by 2016 the excavated area covered 167 acres (68 ha) which, at its deepest was 120 metres (390 ft) below sea level, and some 210 metres (690 ft) below the rim.

Biologically, the whole site was unequivocal. It is (or at least was, before quarrying began) the richest site in Leicestershire for species diversity. Over 200 species of vascular plants, a third of all recorded British spiders, 20 different butterfly species and 200 moth species have all been recorded within the SSSI area. The ancient woodland of Buddon Wood and the pre-reservoir habitats had developed over thousands of years. But with the arrival of the reservoir, numerous new habitats were introduced which have been exploited by wetland plants and above all by birds. 218 different species of wild birds were recorded on and around the reservoir between 1940 and 2000, of which 92 were known to breed there. The open water is a particularly important roosting and feeding area for large number of waterbirds in winter, and as a stopping off point for migrant species passing through.

== Notable tragedies ==
Local woman May Cook drowned in the reservoir in 1924 after apparently fainting while bathing her head. The body of 19-year-old Ethel Oxford was recovered from the reservoir in April 1925. In 1926 the reservoir was the scene of the suicide of local man Albert Edwin Pepper, who drowned himself by entering the water with a stone weighing 40-60 lbs tied to his waist.
