= Bradgate =

Bradgate may relate to:

- Bradgate, Iowa, United States
- Bradgate, Rotherham, United Kingdom
- Bradgate Park, a country park in Leicestershire, England
- Bradgate Electoral Division, an electoral division in Leicestershire, England

== See also ==
- Broadgate (disambiguation)
