= Bradgate Electoral Division =

Coordinates: 52.70°N 1.21°W

Bradgate Electoral Division is a County Council electoral division in Leicestershire, England, taking its name from Bradgate Park which is at the centre of the division. It includes the villages of Anstey, Cropston, Thurcaston, Newtown Linford, Ulverscroft, Swithland, Woodhouse and Woodhouse Eaves, and is currently represented by Deborah Taylor, who won the election in 2025 with 1898 votes (48.7%).
