= Beacon Brook =

Watercourse in Leicestershire, England

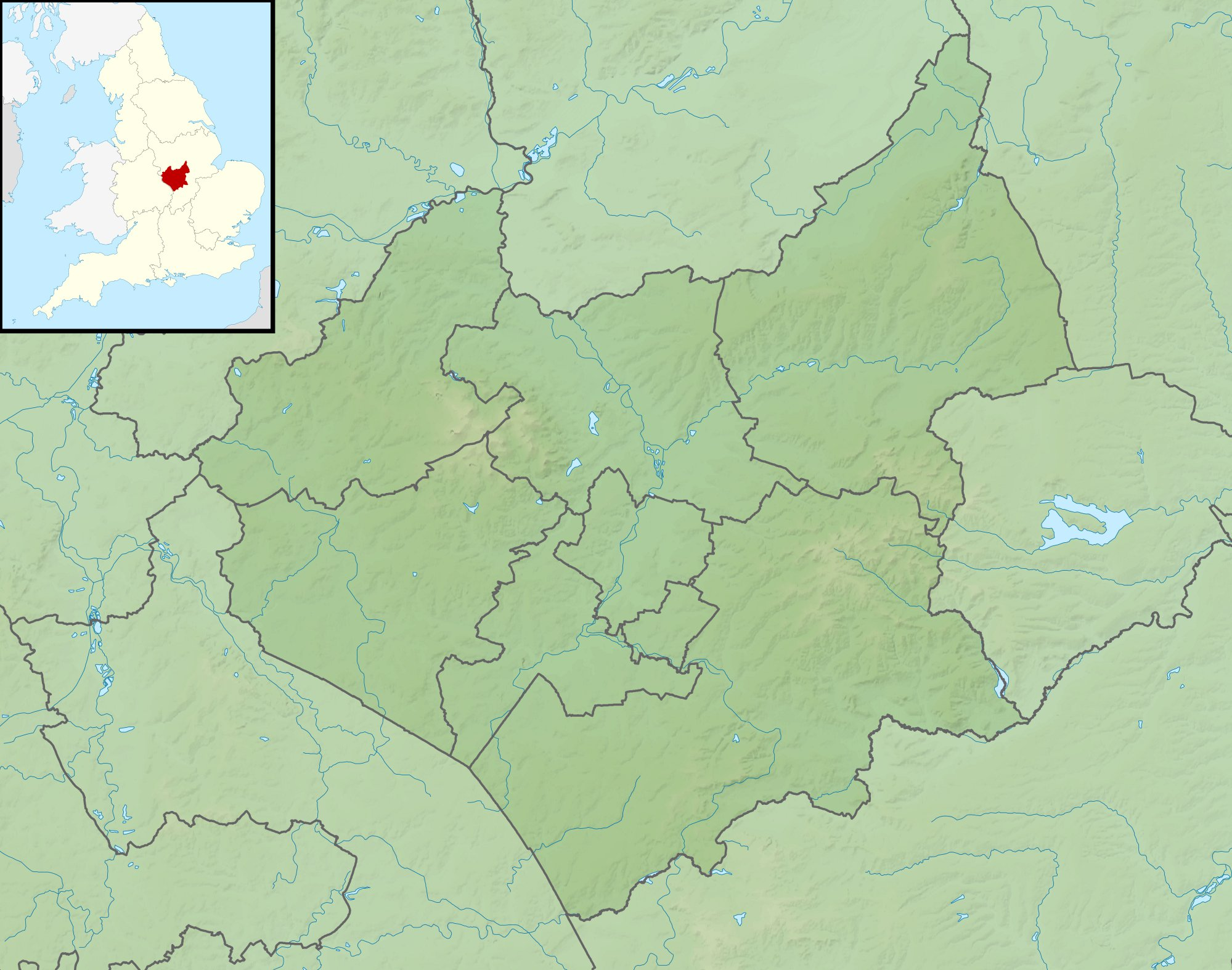
- Location within Leicestershire

Location
- District: Charnwood
- County: Leicestershire
- Country: England
- Sovereign States: United Kingdom

Physical characteristics
- Source: Beacon Hill SSSI
- 2nd source: Broomsbriggs Hill
- Mouth: River Lin
  - location: Quorn, Leicestershire
  - coordinates: 52.74318°N 1.16381°W
- Length: 6.3 km (3.9 mi)
- Width
  - average: 2 m (6.6 ft)
- Depth
  - average: 0.4 m (1.3 ft)

Beacon Brook is a brook which runs through North Leicestershire. The source of the rivulet is in Beacon, near Woodhouse Eaves. The water way runs through Beaumanor Hall before there is a convergence with the River Lin in Quorn. The river runs for around 6 kilometres between its source and confluence with the River Lin.

== Course ==
The source of the brook is at the base of Beacon Hill, where a number of small streams converge. Freshwater from the brook was diverted to Beaumanor Hall Fish Pond. Water from the brook primarily provides an Irrigation system for the fields that bank onto the banks of the brook. At the west and source of the brook is a conifers nursery and open land used mainly for farming cattle. The brook then passes through Beaumanor Hall Estate. At the centre of the brook is primarily agricultural crops, such as wheat and barley. At the east and mouth of the brook passes through Quorn, behind the War memorial and gardens, then continues on to the River Lin.

== Wildlife ==
The waterway itself is a habitat for a number of species, including white-clawed crayfish and species of fish. The river also supports a number of other habitats, providing a source of water for communities of animals including the cattle and deer in the ancient park at Beaumanor Hall.

== Harpocrates Island ==
Harpocrates island offers a wide range of interesting habitats and ecosystems. Since the medieval ages, the island is said to have been protected by three ghostly young men sent by Harpocrates. These young men allegedly protected greater riches than any could know, but these have never been found.

== See also ==
- River Soar
