= Swithland Wood and The Brand =

Woodland in Leicestershire, England

Coordinates: 52.706°N 1.203°W

- Site of Special Scientific Interest
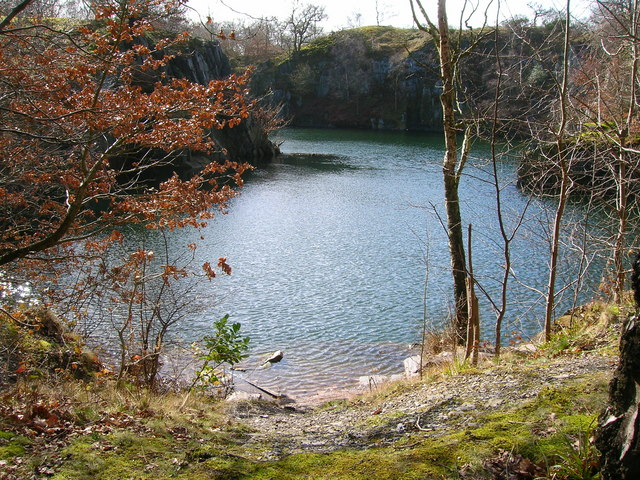
- Disused slate quarry in Swithland Wood
- Location of Swithland Wood and The Brand.
- Area of search: Leicestershire
- Grid reference: SK 538 125
- Interest: Biological
- Area: 87.9 hectares (217 acres)
- Notification date: 1983
- Location map: Magic Map

Swithland Wood and The Brand is an 87.9 hectares (217 acres) biological Site of Special Scientific Interest south of Woodhouse Eaves in Leicestershire. Swithland Wood is a Nature Conservation Review site, Grade II. The Brand is designated a Precambrian site in the Geological Conservation Review, but the dating has been changed due to the discovery of trace fossils from the succeeding Cambrian period.

Location of Swithland Wood, Leicestershire

Swithland Wood is a public woodland in Charnwood Forest, in Leicestershire. Although close to the village of Swithland, it is almost entirely within the parish of Newtown Linford, just north of Bradgate Park and also near Woodhouse Eaves and Cropston. The wood is Leicestershire's most important ancient woodland for nature conservation. Quarries within the wood were a source of the distinctive Swithland Slate roofs found on many local buildings as well as the slate gravestones common in Leicestershire churchyards. Swithland Wood has been a public woodland since 1925, upon its acquisition by the Leicester Rotary Club, having previously been part of the estate of the manor of Groby. Since 1931 it has been managed by the Bradgate Park and Swithland Wood Trust.

== Ancient woodland ==
Swithland Wood is classed as ancient semi-natural woodland. Medieval ridge and furrow shows that most of the area was once cleared of trees, and used for growing crops. Documentary evidence of its use as woodland dates back to 1512 by which time at least part of the site was established woodland. It was probably not 'planted', but simply recolonised the soon-abandoned farmland. However, it has been woodland continuously since then, primarily managed through coppicing. It was subdivided into compartments known by various names: Great Lynds, Little Lynds, Dunham Lynns, Hollgates Wood, Slate Pit Hey and Slate Pit Hill. The woodland was part of the Grey family's Bradgate Estate throughout their time as earls of Stamford. In 1880 they had 26 woodlands on the Bradgate Estate and these were an integrated part of the Grey estates throughout the 17th to 19th centuries. The earliest known use of the name 'Swithland Wood' is in a schedule of 1772. The name now covers all of the Grey estate woodlands on this site. Adjoining the woods on the east are two areas of woodland in Swithland Parish, historically known as Stocking Wood and Whites Wood. These were part of the estates of the Danvers family, and then the earls of Lanesborough. These two woods remain private, and are not part of the Swithland Wood public woodland, although they are part of the designated SSSI.

== Slate quarrying ==
Swithland Slate has been a traditional local roofing material since Roman times. Swithland gives its name to a line of 'slate' outcrops found along the east side of Charnwood, from Hallgates and Little John, through Swithland Wood and The Brand, up to Woodhouse Eaves. All these locations have old slate quarry pits, as does a corresponding outcrop on the other side of the Charnwood anticline at Groby. Swithland Wood had been quarried for many centuries for small-scale slate production. Many of the 24 small pits in Swithland Wood may relate to early slate quarrying. Unlike the management of the woodland, the quarries were leased to local quarrymen. Two industrial scale quarries developed within the woods, one in the 'Great Pit' in the centre of the woods, and the other near the road at the northern end. Similar scales of activity also developed on the other side of Swithland Road, in The Brand, where four more water-filled pits remain.

By the mid-19th century under the management of John Ellis of Leicester, among other things Chairman of the Midland Railway, slate in the Great Pit was being extracted from a depth of more than 180 ft (55 m). Swithland Slate began to be used on vernacular roofs from around 1750 and is still very common on older buildings throughout Charnwood and beyond. Unlike the thinner, lighter Welsh slates, which are used with fixed sized slates, Swithland Slate roofs are graded from small slates along the ridge to largest sizes at the base. Notable buildings on which the slates were used included the Midland Railway's London terminus at St Pancras railway station and the Leicester houses designed by Ernest Gimson. Headstones for graves have been made from Swithland Slate since the 17th century and are found in graveyards throughout Leicestershire and in neighbouring counties, especially Nottinghamshire. They could be engraved with detailed letterings and patterns, which prove to be much more durable than on many other types of stone. Other uses included kerbstones, windowsills and sinks. Once the canals and railways could transport Welsh slate in large quantities at low prices, the demand for local slates diminished. Quarrying in the northern pit ended in 1838, and then in 1887 the Great Pit ceased production. Both pits now have deep water and are fenced off for safety reasons, but paths around the quarries afford good views of the pools and rock faces. The Great Pit is used occasionally for scuba diving.

== Public woodland ==
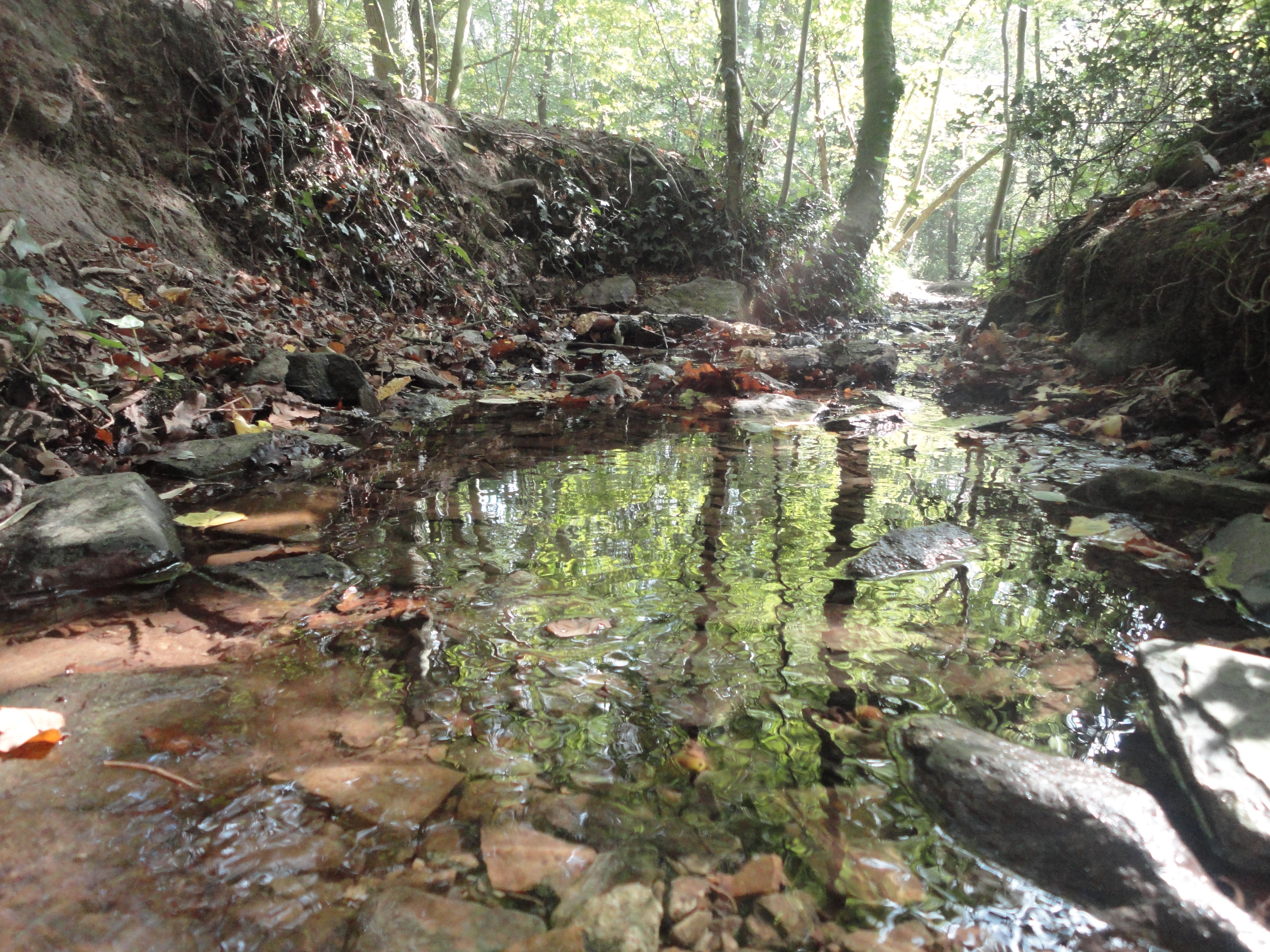
Stream running through Swithland Wood

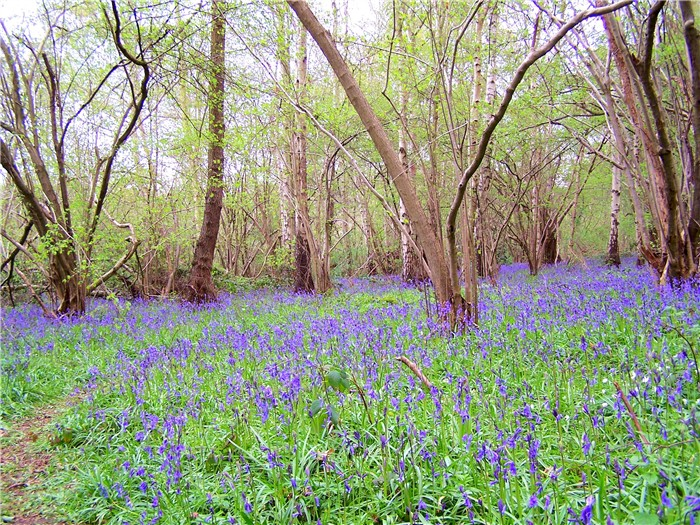
Bluebells in Swithland Wood

After the closing of the quarries the area continued to be an important woodland resource, with active timber management and planting by the Grey Estate. However in 1921, as part of a wholesale disposal of the Bradgate Estate lands, the woods, along with two local farms, were bought by William Gimson. Two adjacent areas of woodland totalling 137 acres (554,000 m²) were offered to the Rotary Club of Leicester in order to preserve these important ancient woodlands and provide public access for the benefit of the people of Leicester and Leicestershire in perpetuity. A charitable trust was established and a fund-raising appeal raised £6,000 (more than half of it from members of the Rotary Club itself) which covered not only the £3,000 purchase price but also renewed fencing, woodland management works and public access facilities. The Rotary Club employed rangers and managed the country park directly for seven years. On the rock face of the Great Pit is an inscription recording the Rotary Club's donation which reads "The Leicester Rotary Club Secured Swithland Wood For A National Heritage".

The area is notable in spring for its bluebells and other spring flowering bulbs which cover large areas of the woodland floor. In 1927 the Rotary Club, in partnership with Swithland Parish Church, initiated an annual Bluebell Service by the Great Pit, and this tradition continues, with the Bluebell Service being held on the afternoon of the third or fourth Sunday of April.

In 1928 a leading Leicester businessman, Charles Bennion, similarly bought the adjacent and larger Bradgate Park for preservation and the public benefit, vested in a charitable trust supported by the Leicester City and Leicestershire County councils and the National Trust. In 1931, with the Bradgate Park Trust fully established, the Rotary Club offered to merge Swithland Wood with Bradgate Park. This was readily agreed by all parties and the two Trusts were combined as the Bradgate Park and Swithland Wood Trust. Since then Swithland Woods has been managed by the Trust rather than the Rotary Club, open to the public, and greatly appreciated for its conservation and leisure value.

== Site of Special Scientific Interest ==
According to Natural England: "The site includes some of the best remaining examples of oak-lime and alder woodland in Leicestershire and is representative of ancient woodland on somewhat acid, loamy soils in the English Midlands." Swithland Wood has received a blend of continuity and disruption in its management that has stimulated its diversity of plant life, whilst allowing complex ecosystems to survive and develop. The disruptions include the quarries, substantial periods of felling in the 19th century, construction of a water main across the site, clearing back of rides and paths, and the arrival of countless tramping feet. Each of these has impacted on some of the trees and plants, but created additional habitats, allowing other species to become established. But as a whole, Swithland Wood has had great continuity, at least since the medieval ploughing ceased. The woods themselves are mixed, principally mature oak, ash, lime and holly. These have been the predominant species for many hundred years, and on the rockiest places have probably always been there. This provides the continuity that has enabled such richness to develop. The result is a woodland with a flora score = 147, the highest score of any of the Leicestershire and Rutland woodlands., ahead of Owston Woods (132) and Burley Wood (125).

== Geology ==
The ancient rocks that characterise Charnwood Forest are an eroded anticline - the layers of sediment built up on a sea floor were uplifted some 420 million years ago, at the end of the Silurian Period. This created a dome, the top of which was eroded to expose successively more ancient rocks. The oldest rocks are found at the northern core, at Blackbrook Reservoir, while Swithland Wood lies on the south-eastern edge of the anticline. The Swithland Slates and other rocks of the 'Brand Group' are the most recent of the Charnian rocks. For most of the 20th century they had been classified as Precambrian rocks along with the more central Charnwood outcrops. This would have dated them to before 539 million years ago. However, recent discoveries of trace fossils, evidence of animals burrowing in the soft mud that became the Swithland Slate, have reclassed all of the Brand Group rocks as Cambrian, formed around 530 million years ago. Although the Charnwood Precambrian rocks have the internationally significant fossils of the frond-like lifeforms of Charnia species, clear evidence of trace fossils of burrowing animal life places the Swithland Formation firmly in the Cambrian Period. Some of these trace fossils can be seen on Swithland Slate headstones, such as those in Ratby churchyard.

The mud that became Swithland Slate was deposited in great quantity on the sea bed, after the more dramatic Precambrian volcanic activity had subsided. It was very fine sediment resulting in fine-grained evenly bedded material. Subsequent deposits above it, combined with the uplifting of the anticline, produced the heat and pressure which turned the mud into hard rock (lithification). The tensions created during uplift are what created the cleavage planes in the slates, and it is along these cleavage joints (rather than the bedding planes) that the slates are split to create roof slates. With the Charnwood area uplifted into a high mountain range, the processes of erosion began.

By the Triassic Period, (240 million years ago) the mountains were eroded down to something like their current height. There then began a new deposition, this time of desert sand and fine dust, that produced a new layer of soft red marl, creating the gentler rolling appearance of the land, with just the tips of the older rocks reaching the surface. Over most of Swithland Wood the marl is the surface rock type (although the slate beds occur underneath that).

Finally, during the ice age, glacial erosion stripped back the Triassic material (plus whatever had accumulated above that), to re-expose the eroded peaks of the older rocks. At the end of the ice age, patches of boulder clay were deposited over much of the local area, including parts of Swithland Wood.

== Access ==
Swithland Wood is open to the public during daylight hours. There are pay and display car parks on Roecliffe Road at SK537117 and on Swithland Road at SK537129. There is also access via a footpath from near the Hallgates entrance to Bradgate Park SK542114. There are several bridleways within the wood for horse-riding, and a network of marked cycle routes.

== See also ==
- List of Sites of Special Scientific Interest in Leicestershire
- List of ancient woods in England
- Slate industry

== Bibliography ==
- Ambrose, Keith; Carney, John; Lott, Graham; Weightman, Gill; McGrath, Annette (2007). Exploring the landscape of Charnwood Forest and Mountsorrel : A walkers' guide to the rocks and landscape of Charnwood Forest and Mountsorrel. Keyworth, Nottingham: British Geological Survey. ISBN 978-0-85272-570-2.
- McGrath, A. (2004). A Geological walk around Bradgate Park and Swithland Wood.'. Keyworth, Nottingham: British Geological Survey. ISBN 0-85272-486-1.
- "National Forest website information page for Swithland Wood" (PDF).
- Squires, Anthony; Jeeves, Michael (1994). Leicestershire and Rutland Woodlands Past and Present. Kairos Press. ISBN 1-871344-03-4.
- Woodward, Stephen F. (1992). Swithland Wood: A Study of its History and Vegetation. LMARS Publications. ISBN 0-85022-303-2.
