= Bradgate Park and Cropston Reservoir =

Protected area in Leicestershire, England

Coordinates: 52.689°N 1.217°W

- Site of Special Scientific Interest
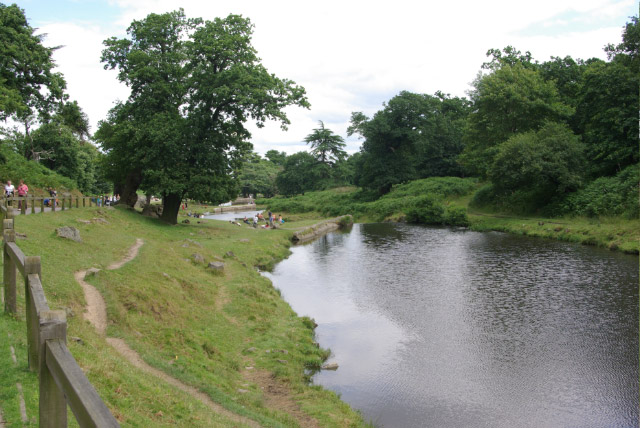
- The River Lin in Bradgate Park
- Location of Bradgate Park and Cropston Reservoir.
- Area of search: Leicestershire
- Grid reference: SK 533 106
- Interest: Biological; Geological
- Area: 399.7 hectares
- Notification date: 1988
- Location map: Magic Map

Bradgate Park and Cropston Reservoir is a 399.7-hectare (988-acre) geological Site of Special Scientific Interest north–west of Leicester. It is also a Nature Conservation Review site, and Bradgate Park contains Geological Conservation Review sites and a Scheduled Monument.

Bradgate Park has one of the best examples of ancient parkland in the county, and Cropston Reservoir has unusual plants on its shores. The park has Charnian rocks dating to the Ediacaran period around 600 million years ago, and it has provided the type section for four different members of the stratigraphic sequence. It is described by Natural England as "a site of great importance to the study of Precambrian palaeontology".

There are footpaths through the park and around the reservoir.
