= Felicity's Wood =

Woodland in Leicestershire, England

- Location within Leicestershire

Geography
- Location: Leicestershire, England
- OS grid: SK504155
- Coordinates: 52.735°N 1.254°W
- Area: 8.77 hectares (21.67 acres)

Administration
- Authority: Woodland Trust

Felicity's Wood is a woodland in Leicestershire, England, near the village of Woodhouse Eaves. It covers a total area of 8.77 hectares (21.67 acres). It is owned and managed by the Woodland Trust.
