= Broadgate (disambiguation) =

Broadgate is an area in the northeast of the City of London:

Broadgate may also refer to:

- Broadgate, East Riding of Yorkshire, England
- Broadgate, Hampshire, England
- Broadgate, the area in the centre of Coventry (England)
- Broadgate, a street in the centre of Lincoln, Lincolnshire, England (part of the A15)
- Broadgate, Lancashire, an area of Preston, Lancashire, England
- Broadgate, a street in Exeter, England
- Broadgate, a road in Beeston, Nottinghamshire
  - Broadgate Park, on the Beeston/Nottingham border

== See also ==
- Bradgate (disambiguation)
