= Cropston Reservoir =

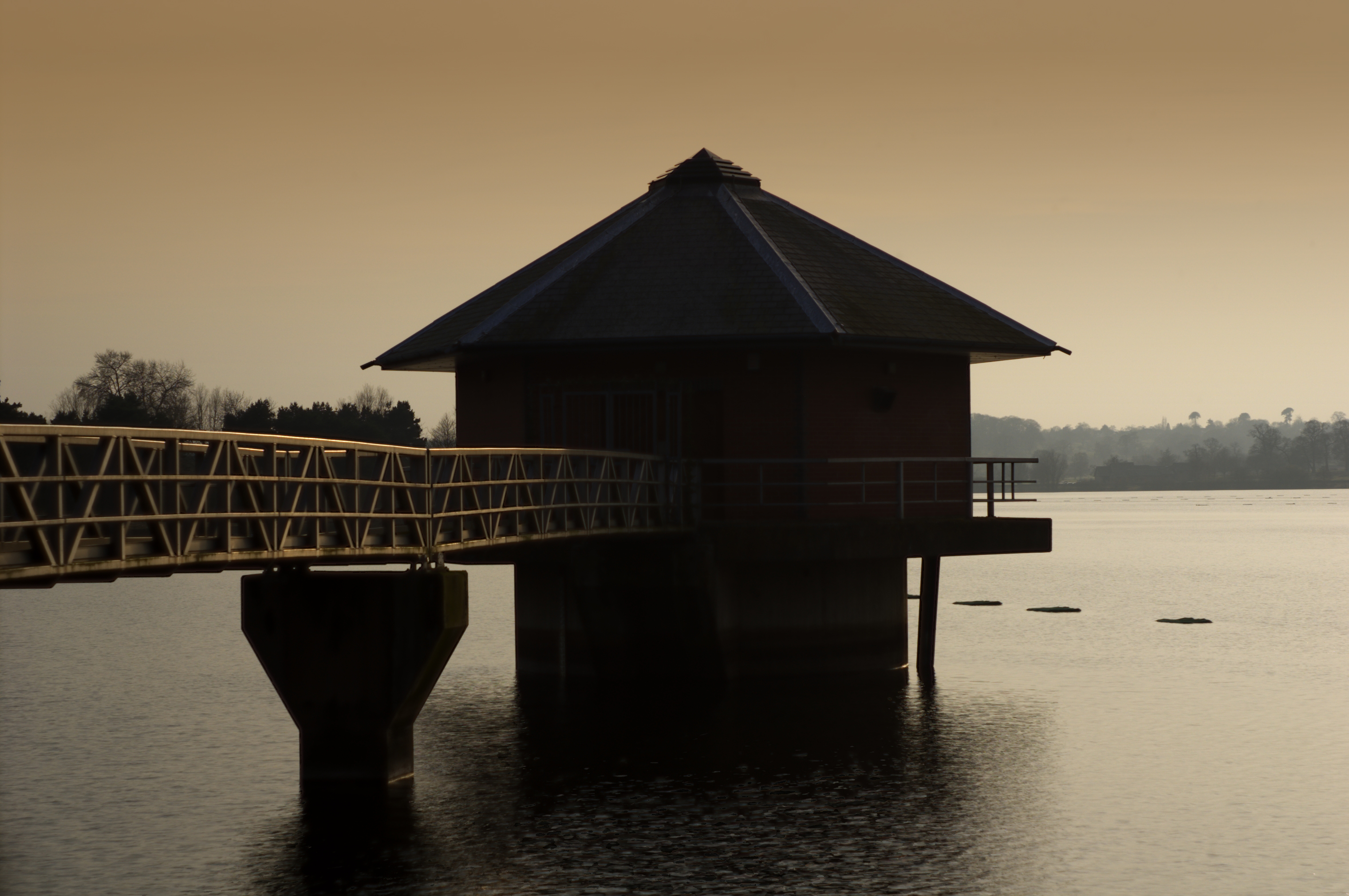

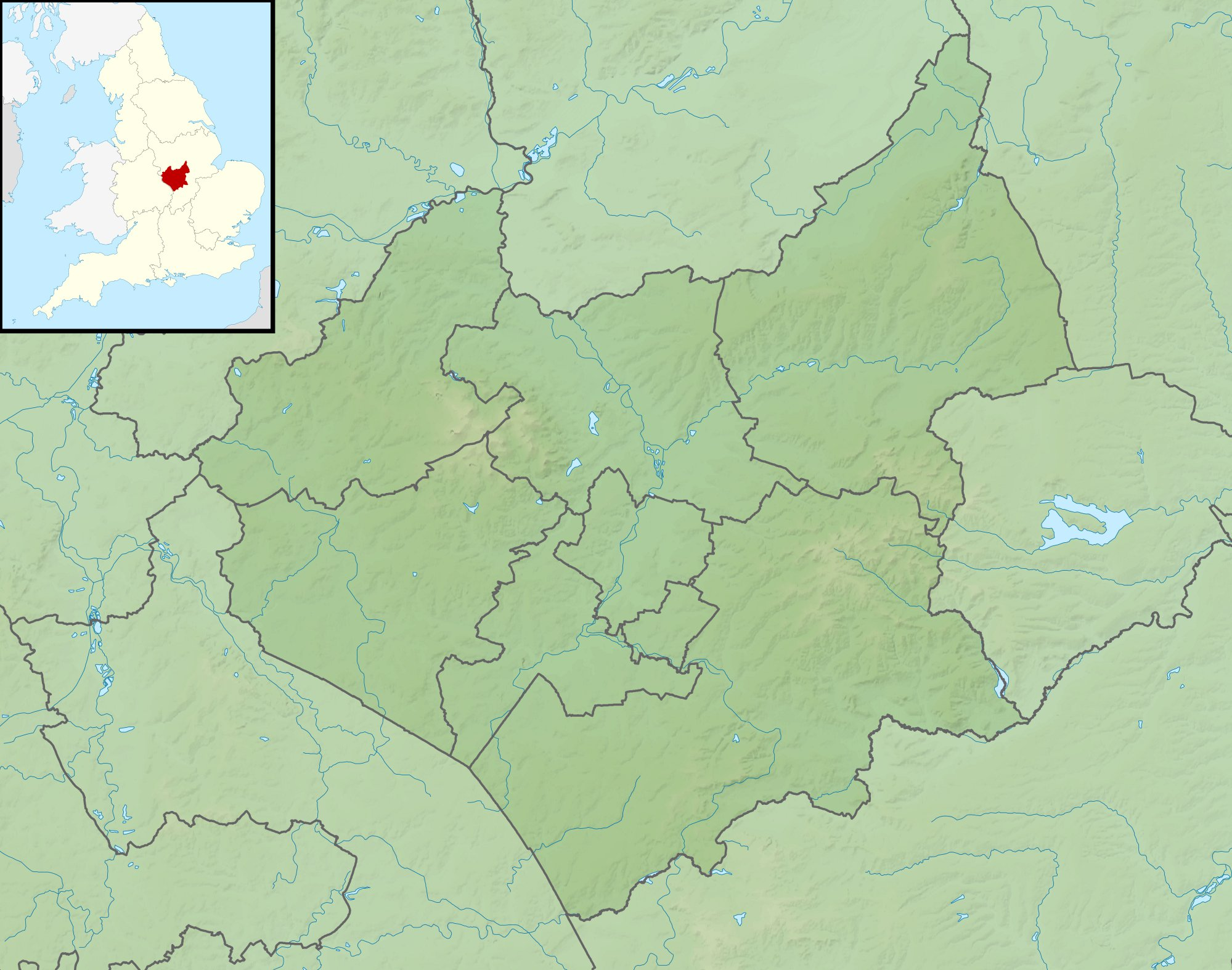
- Location within Leicestershire
- Location: Leicestershire
- Coordinates: 52°41′37.07″N 1°11′38.68″W
- Lake type: reservoir
- Primary inflows: River Lin
- Primary outflows: River Lin
- Basin countries: United Kingdom
- Water volume: 500 million imperial gallons (2.3 GL; 1,800 acre⋅ft)
- Settlements: Cropston

Cropston Reservoir, next to Bradgate Park, Leicestershire ->

Cropston Reservoir (originally known as Bradgate Reservoir) lies in Charnwood Forest in Leicestershire, England. The dam and associated water works are in Cropston, while the bulk of the reservoir is in the neighbouring Newtown Linford parish. It was opened in May 1871 in a corner of Bradgate Park, a large expanse of open land northwest of Leicester. It is part of the 987-acre (399.3 ha) Bradgate Park and Cropston Reservoir Site of Special Scientific Interest.

London-based consulting engineer Thomas Hawksley was appointed by the Leicester Waterworks Company in 1865 to carry out the surveying work. In September 1867, 180 acres (73 ha) of land adjacent to the deer park at Bradgate Park was purchased from the Earl of Stamford for a cost of £24,000. A stone wall was built by George Rudkin around the boundary to separate the deer park from the reservoir, at a cost of 8s 10d per yard. The dam is 760 yards (690 m) long and rises to a height of 51 feet (16 m) at its highest point, which gives a depth of water of 38 feet (12 m). The cost of the dam was £41,356 and the reservoir £8,500 with the contract being awarded to Benton & Woodiwiss of Derby. The reservoir was completed in 1870. The dam was originally constructed from a mixture of siliceous sand and clay, but as water was found to be leaking through it, it was rebuilt and now extends 40 feet (12 m) below the surface. Water from the reservoir was piped to four large filter beds. It was then pumped to an elevation matching the supply from Thornton Reservoir so that the supplies from the two reservoirs could be merged.

The reservoir is formed by the River Lin and is owned and managed by Severn Trent. The growing population of Leicester and surrounding areas meant that by the late 19th century the reservoirs in Leicestershire were no longer adequate to meet demand, and water is now piped from Ladybower Reservoir to Cropston by the Derwent aqueduct.

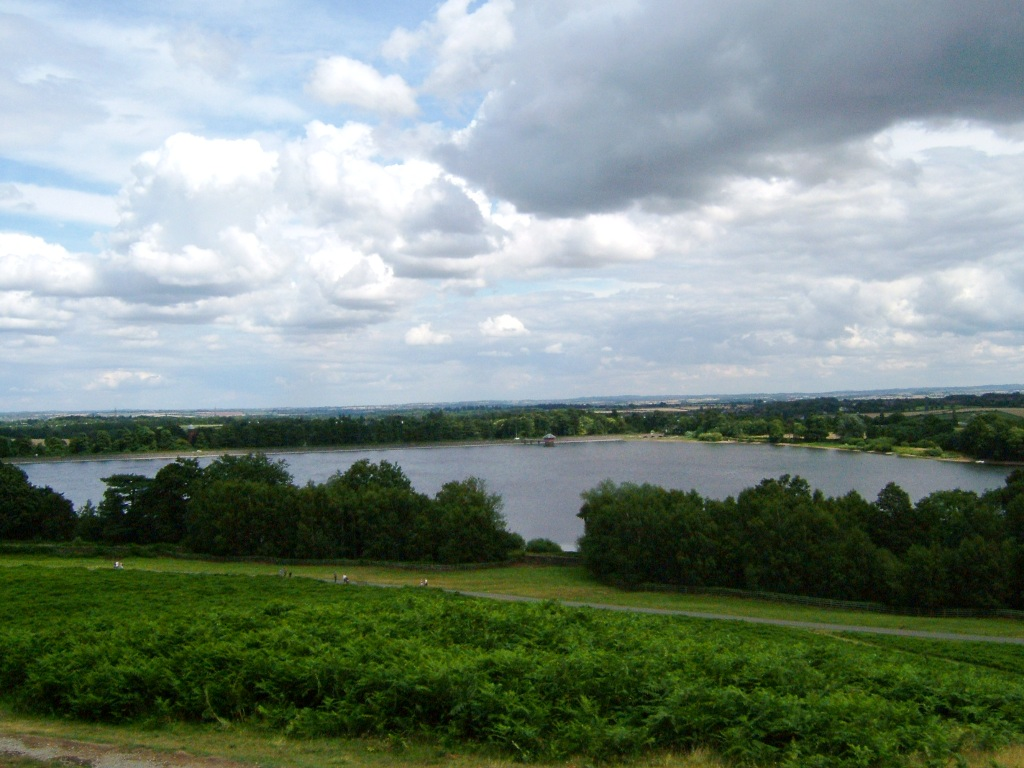
Cropston Reservoir viewed from Bradgate Park
