= Old John =

Highest hill in Bradgate Park

Coordinates: 52°41′46.76″N 1°13′26.07″W

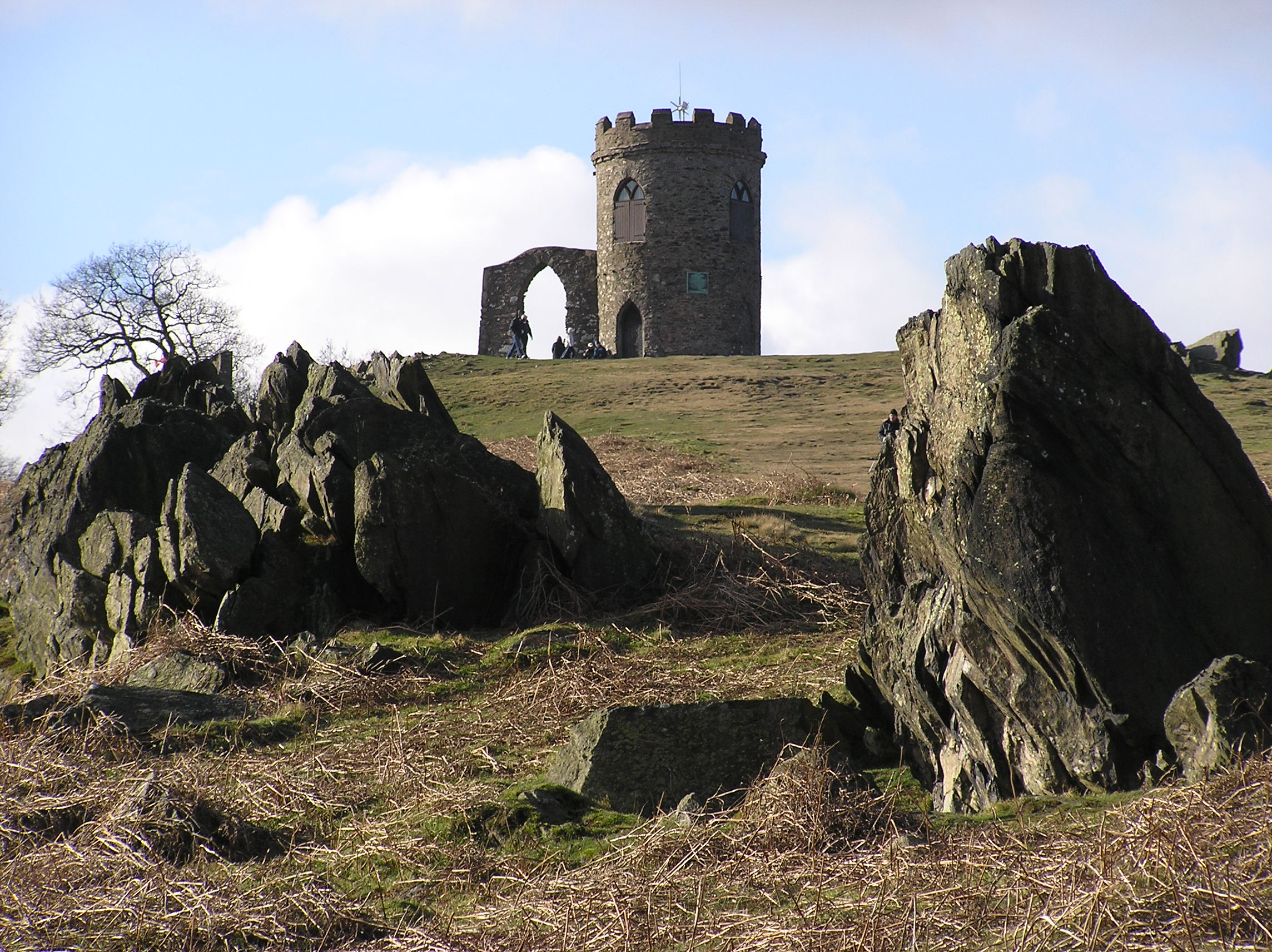
Old John

Old John Tower in Bradgate Park, Leicestershire

Old John is the highest hill in Bradgate Park, Leicestershire, England, on the southern edge of Charnwood Forest. It gives its name to the folly that stands at its top. The hill stands at 212 metres (696 ft) high, and is a prominent landmark across Leicester and Leicestershire.

== Old John Tower ==
The earliest recorded use of the name is on a map of 1754, which records a windmill on the site, some 30 years before the tower was built. The tower itself began life as a ruined folly, built in 1784, during the time of George Grey, 5th Earl of Stamford. He got Thomas Sketchley of Anstey to build him the mock ruin, which had strong similarities to Mow Cop, Staffordshire. It was adapted in the mid-19th century by the seventh Earl to serve as an observation tower for the practice circuit he laid out for his horses, along with the building of a stable block lower down the hill. It is well known for its "mug-shape" — there was a longer section of wall adjoining the tower after the 19th century extension but this reduced in size over the years leaving the present 'handle' shape. The mug shape has given rise to false accounts of the tower's origins supposedly relating to a beer-loving miller who was killed after being hit by a pole during a bonfire.

In the past it has also been used as a meeting place for hunters with their fox hounds, and a luncheon house for shooting parties in the park, prior to the park being donated for public use in 1928. Internally, the tower retains a number of 19th century fittings, including timber floors, slate fireplaces, shuttered windows and a castellated roof. The tower is a grade II listed building. A narrow spiral staircase gives access to the upper floor, and is open to visitors on the park's guided walk programmes.

In 2001, Bradgate Park Trust registered the design of the building as a trademark, and in 2018 told a local artist that she would have to pay them if she continued to sell her paintings of it.

== Toposcope ==
Adjacent to the tower is a toposcope erected in 1953. This was given by the people of Newtown Linford from money raised at the 1953 'Pageant of Lady Jane Grey', performed to celebrate 400 years since she was proclaimed Queen of England.

== War memorial ==
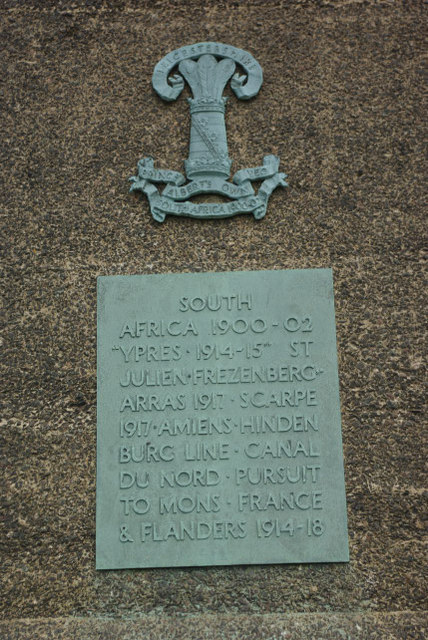
Leicestershire Yeomanry Memorial, Bradgate Park

Old John Tower occupies the north-eastern end of a ridge. Straddling the centre of the ridge is Old John Spinney, and at the south-western end, also at 212 metres (696 ft) is the Leicestershire Yeomanry War Memorial. This was built around 1920 to commemorate the fallen of the Leicestershire Yeomanry from their 1900-1902 Boer War campaign and World War I. A further memorial plaque was added after the World War II. An annual wreath-laying ceremony is held at the War Memorial around the anniversary of the Battle of Frezenberg, (which was fought near Ypres in France on 13 May 1915).

== Visibility and access ==
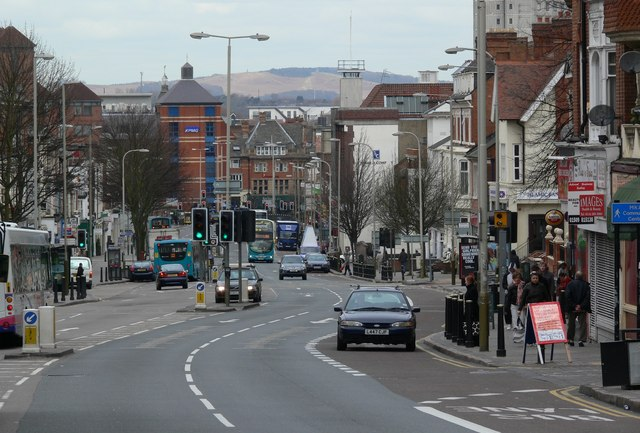
View of Old John from London Road, Leicester

Bradgate Park is open to the public during all daylight hours. Of the three Bradgate pay and display car parks, the most northerly gives the nearest access to Old John. Formally known as the Hunts Hill Car Park, it is generally called the 'Old John Car Park' by its users.

The distinctive outline of the Old John hilltop with its two landmark structures, visible from many parts of Leicester and the surrounding county, has given it a particular local significance to the people of Leicestershire.
