= Charles Bennion =

British businessman, manufacturer and philanthropist (1857-1929)

- Charles Bennion
- Born: 1857; Adderley, Shropshire
- Died: 21 March 1929 (aged 71–72)
- Occupations: Businessman, manufacturer and philanthropist

Charles Bennion (1857 – 21 March 1929) was a businessman, manufacturer and philanthropist who purchased Bradgate Park for the people of Leicestershire.

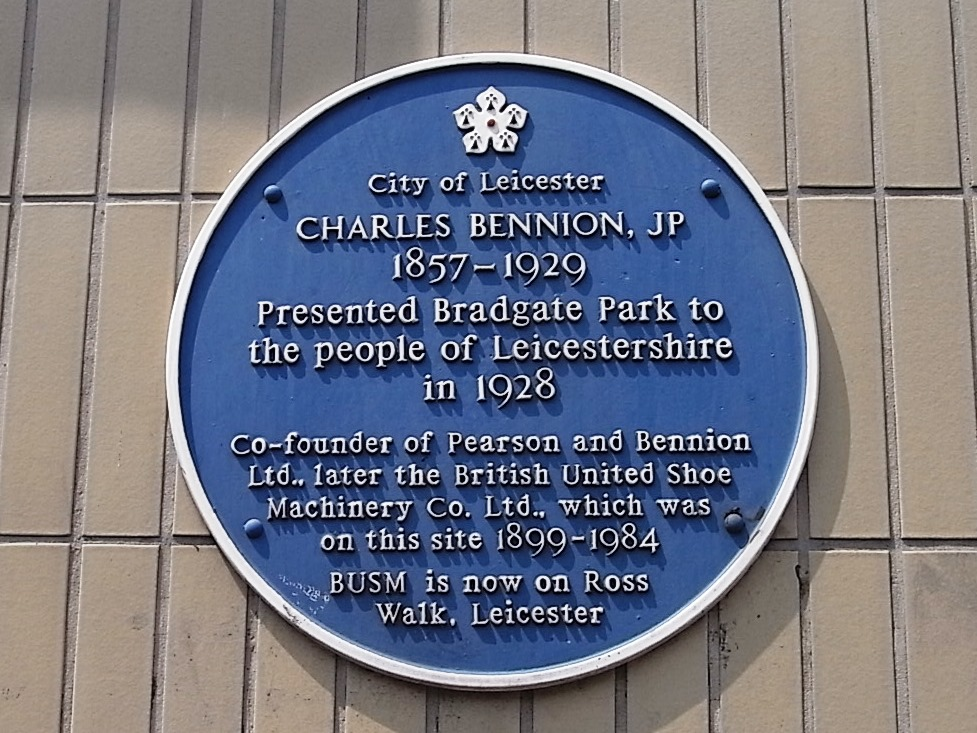
Charles Bennion Blue Plaque at the former site of the British United Shoe Machinery Company in Belgrave Road, Leicester

Born in Adderley, Shropshire, the son of a farmer, Bennion was attracted by the new technologies of his age -steam power and mechanisation- that were revolutionising agriculture, transport and manufacturing.

He began his career with an apprenticeship at Crewe railway works in Crewe, Cheshire, and then, having learned a trade which had widespread applications, broadened his horizons by travelling the world as a ship's engineer. On his return to England he became involved in shoe machinery manufacture and in the 1880s he settled in Leicester which, along with Northampton, was a leading centre of Britain's boot and shoe industry.

In 1899 he established Pearson and Bennion Ltd in partnership with a Leeds man, Marshall Pearson.

Pearson and Bennion Ltd later merged with the United Shoe Machinery Company of America to form the British United Shoe Machinery Co. Ltd. Charles Bennion was managing director of the new company from 1899 until his death in 1929.

Bennion's affection for his adopted county and the people of Leicestershire is shown by his purchase of Bradgate Park on their behalf. The park, 850 acres (3.4 km^{2}) of outstanding historic beauty, was put up for sale by its owners, the Grey Family (Baron Grey of Groby was also Earl of Stamford), in 1925. It had been offered to Leicester for public use, but the money needed to buy the land could not be raised. Charles Bennion came to the rescue. The park was purchased and placed into a trust and was formally presented to the people of Leicestershire on 29 December 1928, with the wish that it should be retained in perpetuity in its natural condition. Since then it has become Leicestershire's most visited attraction, popular with local people and tourists alike.

A plaque set in local granite and commemorating Charles Bennion's generosity can be found in Bradgate Park. It reads;

`In grateful remembrance of Charles Bennion of Thurnby of this county who in 1928 with the helpful concurrence of the heirs of the Greys of Groby purchased from them this park of Bradgate and presented it in trust for the city and county of Leicester that for all time it might be preserved in its natural state for the quiet enjoyment of the people of Leicestershire. His true memorial lies around'

There is also a Blue Plaque at the former site of the British United Shoe Machinery Co. Ltd in Belgrave Road, Leicester.

Bennion was also a prominent Freemason and was a Past Master of St John's Lodge No.279, Albert Edward Lodge No.1560, and Lodge Semper Eadem No.3091, a Founder member of East Goscote Lodge No.2865 and Provincial Grand Treasurer of Leicestershire and Rutland.

Bennion died on 21 March 1929, aged 71. He left estate valued at £275,051. His widow, Marianne Louisa Ann died on 7 February 1939. The Bennions' home, Thurnby Grange, along with two of the 34 acres of grounds, was subsequently sold at auction to Billesdon Rural Council for £3,000.
