= Thornton Reservoir =

Lake in Leicestershire, England

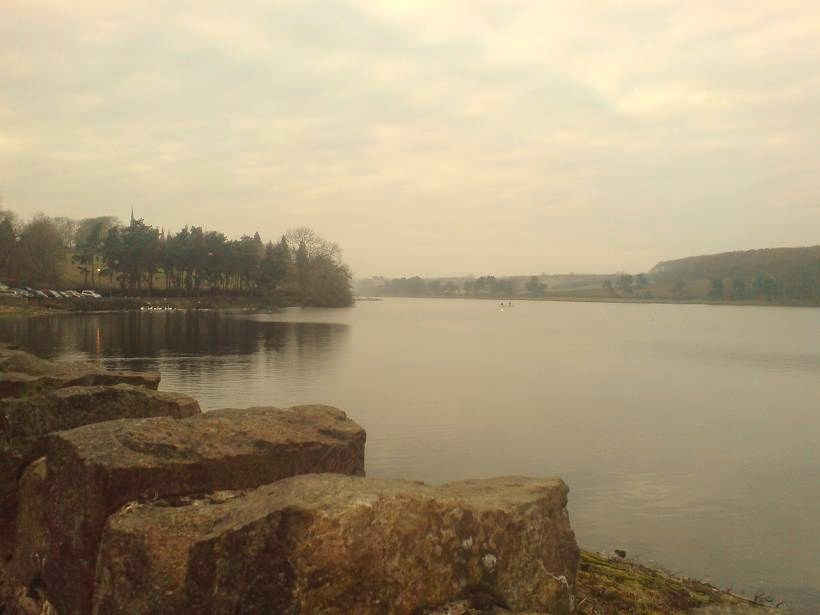
- The reservoir from the dam

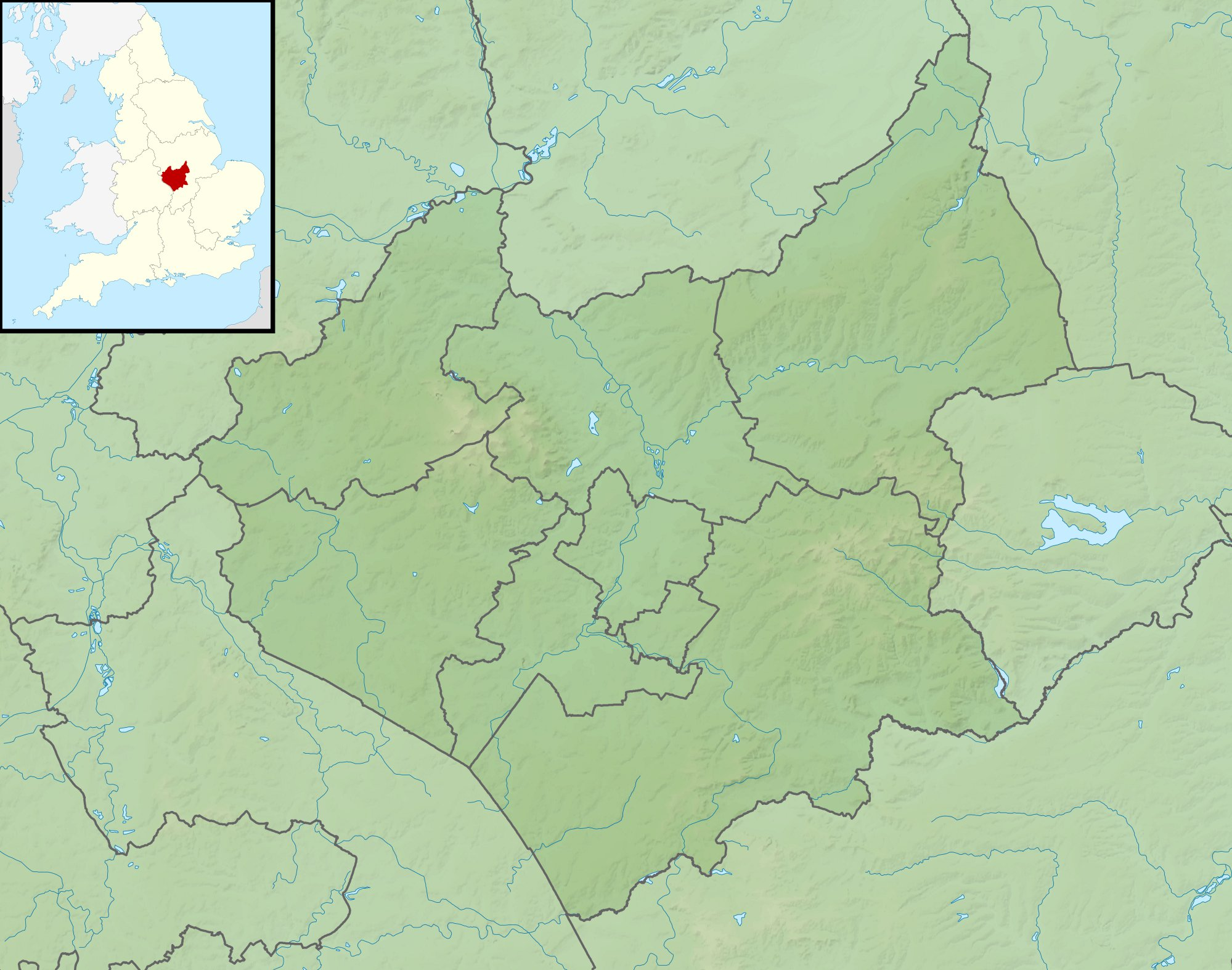
- Location within Leicestershire
- Location: Leicestershire
- Coordinates: 52°39′50″N 1°18′8″W
- Type: reservoir
- Primary inflows: Carr Brook, Thornton Brook
- Primary outflows: Rothley Brook
- Basin countries: United Kingdom
- Surface area: 75 acres (30 ha)
- Water volume: 229×10^{6} imp gal (1,040 ML; 840 acre⋅ft)
- Shore length^{1}: 2.45 mi (3.94 km)
- ^{1} Shore length is not a well-defined measure.

For the quarry in Chicago, see Thornton Quarry

Thornton Reservoir is a small reservoir situated in the National Forest near the village of Thornton in Leicestershire. It has a surface area of 75 acres (300,000 m^{2}) and a perimeter of 2.45 miles (3.94 km). It was originally built in 1854 when it had its own treatment works which were situated to the south of the current dam. It is now owned by Severn Trent and the water is treated a few miles away at Cropston Reservoir to which it runs via Rothley Brook. The reservoir is fed by two small streams which enter from the north via two weirs. Rothley Brook takes water away from the south.

Since 1997 the reservoir and the surrounding land has been open to the public. Facilities include a small visitor centre, a sculpture trail, a woodland walk and a (now closed) trout fishery. The National Cycle Network runs around the reservoir.

Planning for the reservoir began in 1847. The design included a dam where Locky Bridge had previously stood, the reservoir fed by Carr Brook and Thornton Brook. Behind the dam were two filtration tanks, and from there the water was carried via gravitation to a storage reservoir in Oadby. Supply from the reservoir began in 1853, with Thomas Cook's Temperance Hall the first building to receive water from it. The reservoir was thought sufficient to serve Leicester's population of 58,000 at the time, delivering 1.6 million gallons per day, and was the main source of water for the city until the opening of Bradgate Reservoir in 1871. The surface area was originally calculated at 55 acres with the capacity 229 million gallons. The estimated cost of building the reservoir was £80,000.

The reservoir was taken out of use in 1982, but was opened up to the public in 1997, with paths around the edge and the closed trout fishery on the west bank.
