= Newtown Linford =

Village in Leicestershire, England

Coordinates: 52.686°N 1.237°W

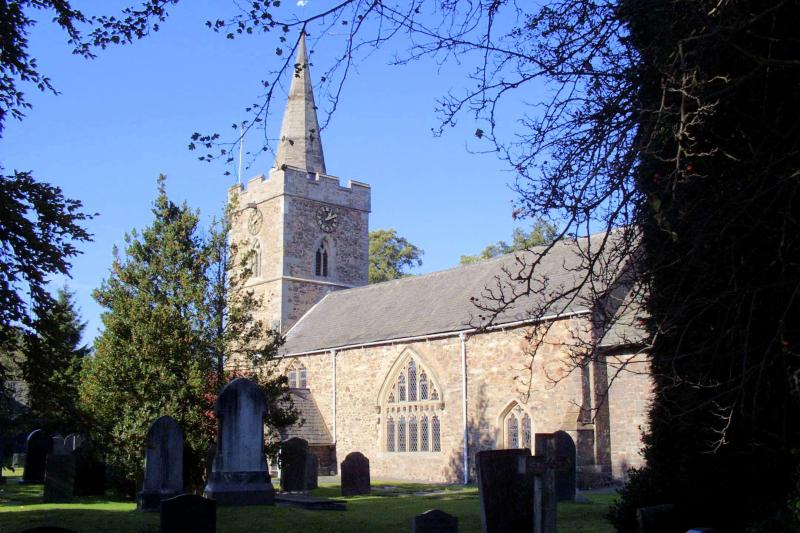
- All Saints’ Church, Newtown Linford

- Location within Leicestershire
- Population: 1,136 (2021)
- OS grid reference: SK517101
- District: Charnwood
- Shire county: Leicestershire
- Region: East Midlands
- Country: England
- Sovereign state: United Kingdom
- Post town: LEICESTER
- Postcode district: LE6
- Dialling code: 01530
- Police: Leicestershire
- Fire: Leicestershire
- Ambulance: East Midlands
- UK Parliament: Mid Leicestershire

Newtown Linford is a linear village in Leicestershire, England. The population of the civil parish was 1,000 at the 2001 census, including Ulverscroft, increasing to 1,103 at the 2011 census, and 1,136 at the 2021 census.

The village lies in a valley in the Charnwood Forest area, and has four access roads. The first is from Anstey, then there are roads which lead to the A50 at Groby and at Markfield (the former passing Groby Pool). Another road that leads north towards Ulverscroft, or Loughborough, Woodhouse, Woodhouse Eaves, Swithland etc.

== History ==
The village's name originates from the relocation of people when the Ferrers family of Groby turned Bradgate into a deer park. The people who lived within the estate were moved to the "New Town" - or hamlet as it would have been then, at the ford of the river Lin (once located at the junction of Markfield Lane and Main Street). The village was first documented in 1293 and was previously known as "Lyndynford". The villagers were all tenants of the Ferrers family, and later the Grey family.

The village is famous for Bradgate Park, a large country park which was home to Lady Jane Grey, Queen for nine days. Bradgate Park is a popular destination for days out in Leicestershire, home to several herds of deer, and children are often seen paddling in the shallow river Lin, which runs through it. There are a few shops (mainly aimed at the day-trippers who come to Bradgate Park) but the garden centre which used to dominate the centre of the village closed in 2004 and has been built on for housing. All of the properties in the village belonged to the Grey Estate until 1925 when it was sold off. Much of the village was designated a conservation area in 1972, and there are 32 listed buildings in the village which include the old style red telephone box.

== Local area ==
There is one pub in the village - The Bradgate and one Club The Linford. There is a primary school which celebrated its centenary in 2007, and various restaurants. The Johnscliffe Hotel was demolished a few years ago to make way for housing.

Bradgate Park attracts walkers and cyclists, and in the summer the village is often full of day-trippers from all around Leicestershire.

The River Lin runs through the village, before flowing through Bradgate Park and joining the reservoir at Cropston.

Newtown Linford boasts a large number of old cottages with a lot of character - especially between Groby Lane and Markfield Lane. At the end of Groby Lane is the village cricket pitch. All Saints Church (built c.1400) is next to the cricket pitch, but the village cemetery lies at the top of the hill on Groby Lane. The churchyard includes a gravestone inscribed with the letters of the alphabet and numerals, said to have been a practice stone purchased by a miserly man to save on the cost of getting a stone inscribed.

The village's cricket club plays in the Premier Division of the Leicestershire & Rutland Cricket League, the Second Team plays in Division Two and the Third XI in Division Seven West. They are ECB Clubmark accredited.

They also operate a Sunday team, a Thursday League evening side and Under 10s, 13s, 15s & 17s. Players of all abilities are welcome.

In 2015 the Club were the winners of the Yorkshire Tea Cricket Tea Challenge and as part of their prize hosted a PCA Masters XI in front of almost 1,000 spectators at their Main Street ground.

Newtown Linford is also home to one of Britain's surviving police boxes. This box is a listed building and is still used by the local Police beat team today.

== Governance ==
Newtown Linford is located within the Mid Leicestershire parliamentary constituency, currently represented by Peter Bedford. It is within the Bradgate County Electoral Division and is represented on Leicestershire County Council by Councillor Deborah Taylor. It is within the Forest Bradgate ward of Charnwood Borough Council, on which is represented by Councillor David Snartt. Newtown Linford is twinned with Plateau Est de Rouen in France.
