= River Lin =

River in Leicestershire, England

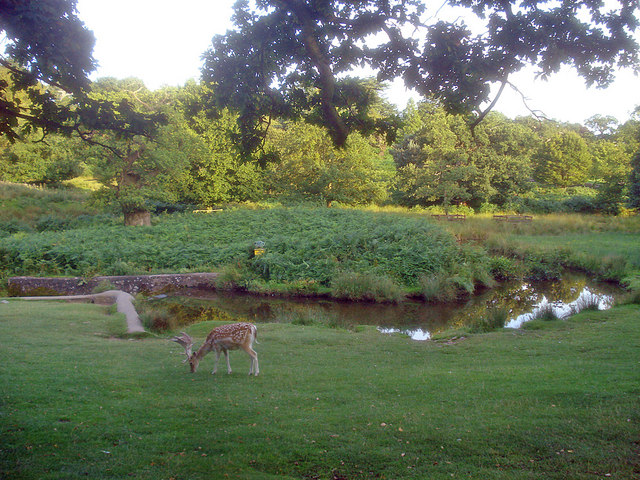
- The River Lin running through Bradgate Park

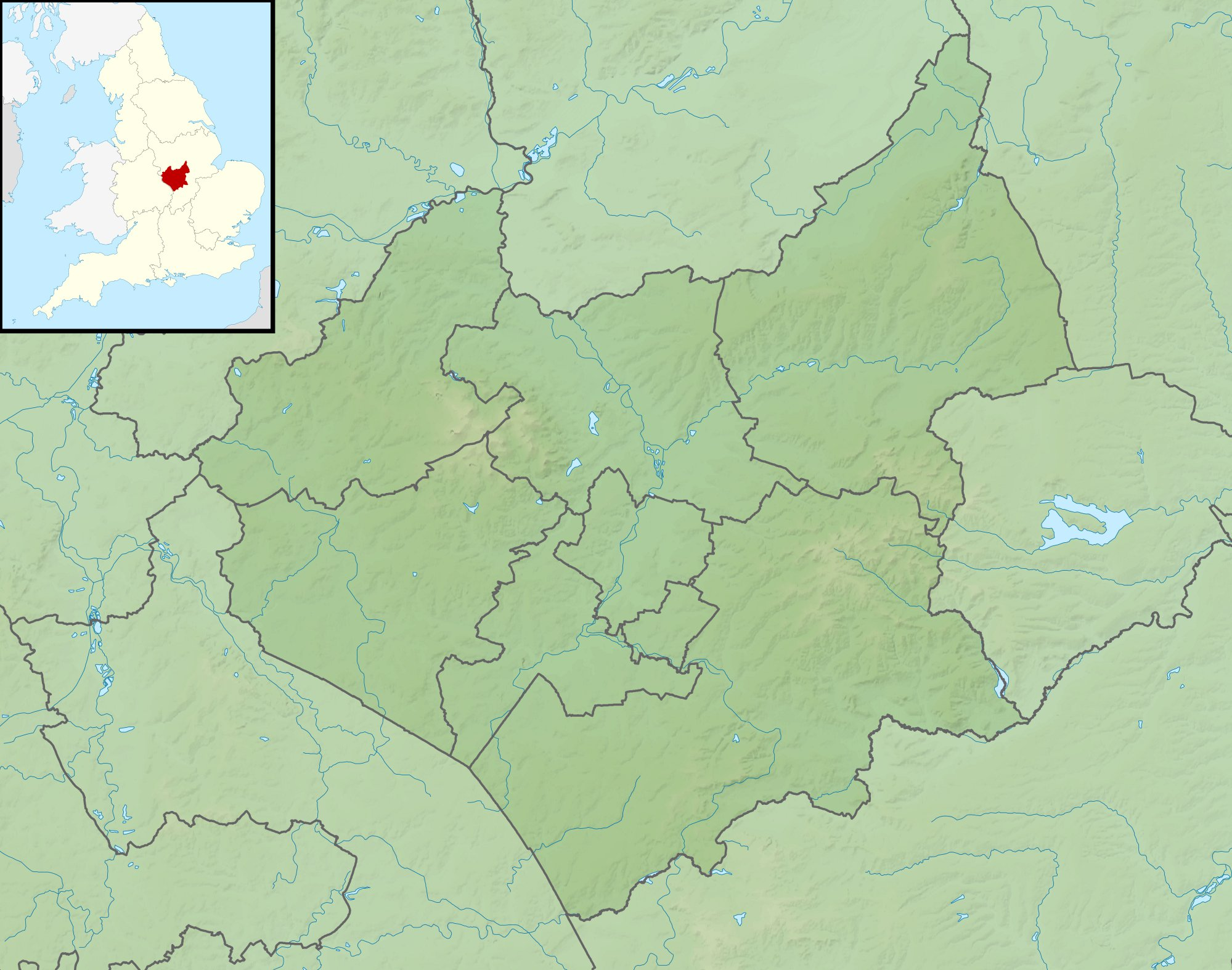
- Location within Leicestershire

Location
- Country: England
- County: Leicestershire

Physical characteristics
- Source: Ulverscroft
- Mouth: River Soar
  - location: Quorn
  - coordinates: 52.74318°N 1.16381°W
- Length: 17 km (11 mi)

The River Lin is a river which runs through North Leicestershire. The source of the river is in Ulverscroft, near Charnwood Forest. The river runs through Bradgate Park before the river runs into the River Soar in Quorn. The river also feeds Cropston Reservoir and Swithland Reservoir. The river runs for around 17 kilometres between its source and confluence with the River Soar. The river is described as one of Leicestershire's shortest rivers.

== Course ==
The source of the river is at the head of the Ulverscroft Valley, where a number of small streams converge. At this point, the river is named locally as the Ulverscroft Brook. The source of the river is 163m above sea level. Freshwater from the brook was diverted to feed Lord Stamford's Pond. The Stamford family were major landowners in the area, owning the land which later became Bradgate Park. The river passed close by Ulverscroft Mill. Water from the river would also serve Ulverscroft Priory. Water from the river feeds into Cropston Reservoir. The river passes through the village of Newtown Linford and through the lower area of Bradgate Park. The river gives its name to Newtown Linford, with the village being named due to its location as a ford over the river Lin. The river continues downstream through Bradgate Park towards Swithland Woods. Beyond Swithland Woods, the river continues towards the River Soar, with the confluence with the River Soar towards the town of Quorn.

== Wildlife ==
The river supports a number of habitats, and is described as a high quality watercourse. The river itself is a habitat for a number of species, including white-clawed crayfish and species of fish. The river also supports a number of other habitats, providing a source of water for communities of animals including the deer in the ancient deer park at Bradgate Park. The river is protected within a conservation area of the Leicestershire Wildlife Trust.

== See also ==
- List of rivers of England
