= Bradgate Park =

Public park in Leicestershire, England

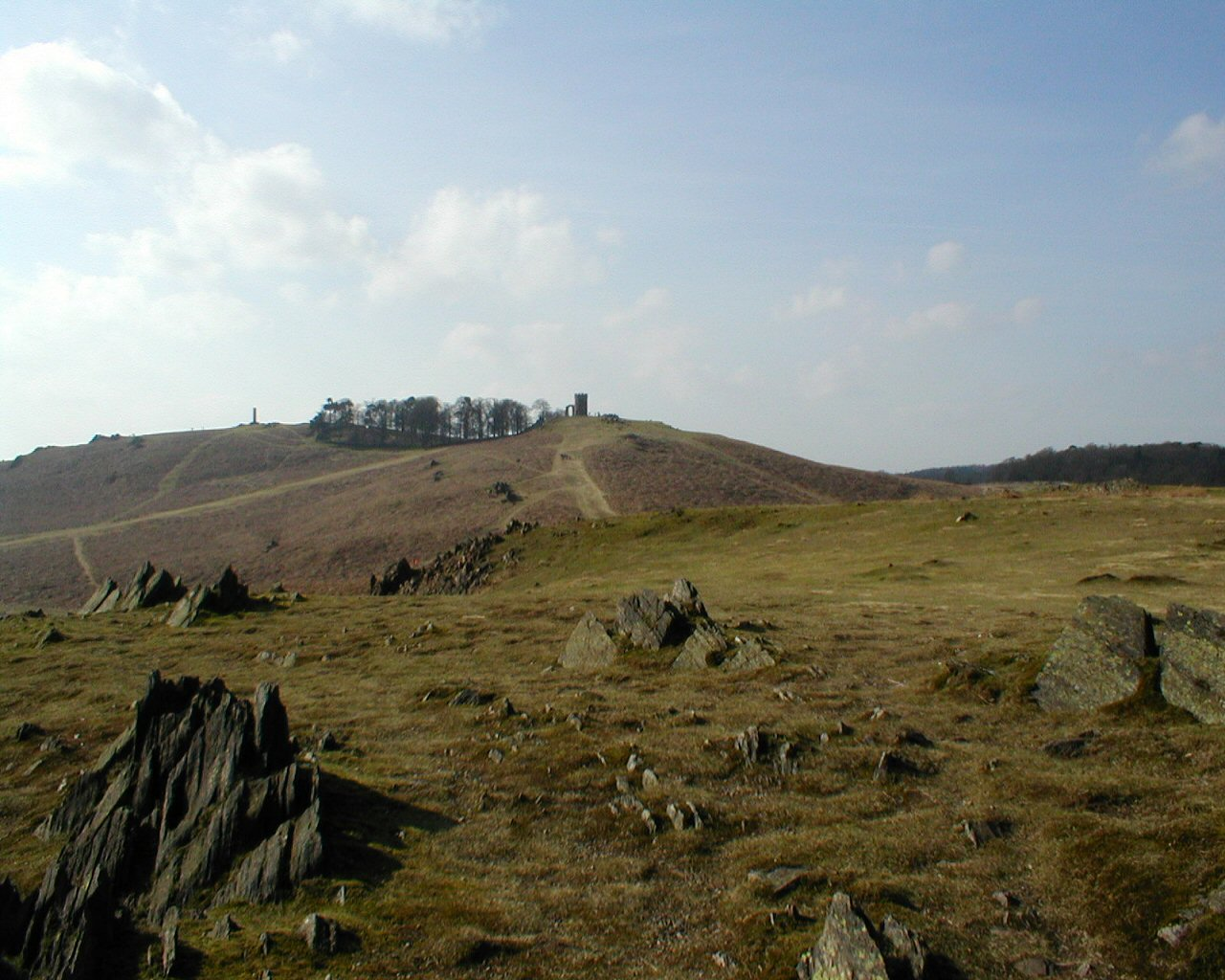
- Rocks, Old John and the War Memorial

- Location within Leicestershire
- Type: Medieval Deer Park
- Location: Leicestershire, UK
- Nearest city: Leicester
- OS grid: SK529107
- Coordinates: 52.6917°N 1.2214°W
- Area: 850 acres (340 ha)
- Elevation: 75-80m to 212m (c.250 - 700ft)
- Created: 1500 (Public Park from 1928)
- Operator: Bradgate Park and Swithland Wood Charity (Registered Charity no. 521476, (popularly known as the Bradgate Park Trust)
- Visitors: 900,000
- Open: all year, 7.45 am to dusk
- Website: www.bradgatepark.org

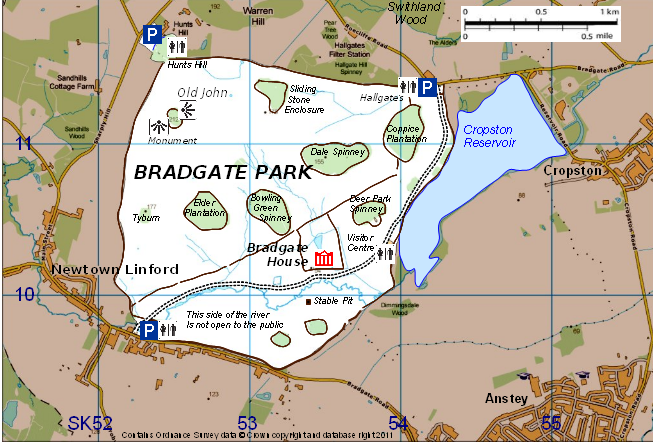
Bradgate Park and surrounding villages

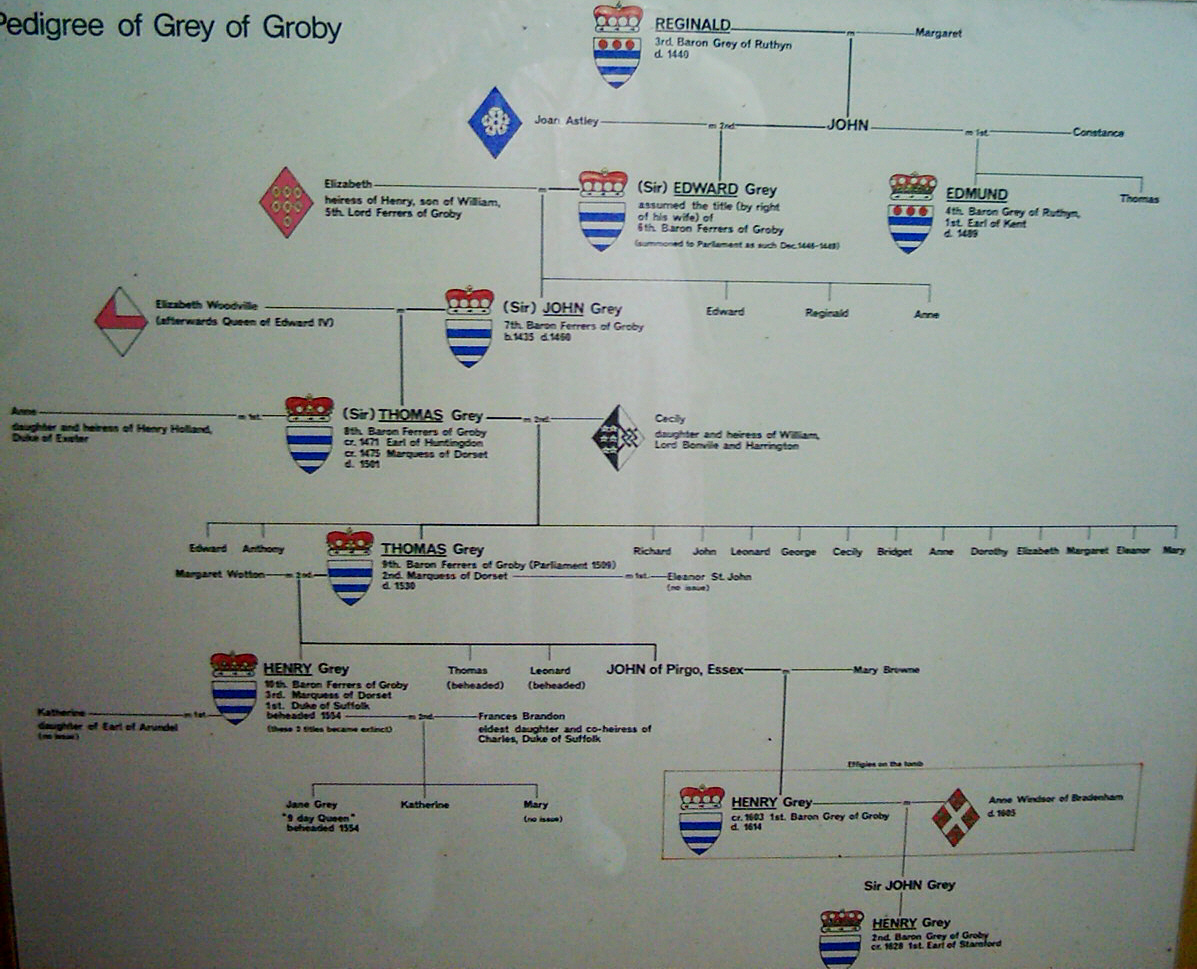
Reginald Grey Pedigree of Grey of Groby displayed within Bradgate Hall ruins.

Bradgate Park (/ˌbrædɡət/) is a public park in Charnwood Forest, in Leicestershire, England, northwest of Leicester. It covers 850 acres (340 hectares). The park lies between the villages of Newtown Linford, Anstey, Cropston, Woodhouse Eaves and Swithland. The River Lin runs through the lower park, flowing into Cropston Reservoir which was constructed on part of the park, by the Victorians. The River Lin is protected as a Site of Special Scientific Interest and it is also the shortest river in the Leicestershire. A part of the park has also been named as ‘Little Matlock’. The walk through the park has an extensive ‘Victorian-designed landscape’. It was named this as it’s similar to the landscape of the Peak District.To the north-east lies Swithland Wood. The park's two well known landmarks, Old John and the war memorial, both lie just above the 210 m (690 ft) contour. The park is part of the 399.3 hectare Bradgate Park and Cropston Reservoir Site of Special Scientific Interest, which has been designated under both biological and geological criteria. In 2024 Bradgate Park and Swithland Wood were designated a National Nature Reserve.

== History ==
The area now enclosed as Bradgate Park was one of a number of parks surrounding Charnwood Forest. It has been enclosed as a deer park for around 800 years. Since medieval times it has been part of the Manor of Groby. In the reign of Edward the Confessor, the area was owned by a landowner named Ulf. The manor, along with some 100 others in and around Leicestershire, was awarded to Hugh de Grandmesnil in the eleventh century as reward for his assistance in battle to William I. The name Bradgate is thought to derive from Norse or Anglo-Saxon, meaning "broad road" or "broad gate" respectively. The first mention of Bradgate Park is from 1241, by which time it was laid out as a hunting park, although rather smaller than the current boundary. It was subsequently acquired by the Beaumont family, passing to the de Quincy family and on to William de Ferrers of Groby. It remained in the de Ferrers family until 1445, when it passed to the Grey family after William's only surviving daughter married Edward Grey. The Grey family built Bradgate House and gardens in the 16th century, probably being completed in around 1520. The inquisition into the estates of de Ferrers, made after his death, mentions the park, with "herbage, pannage and underwood, worth 40 shillings yearly". The Grey family retained it for the next 500 years, and in the 19th century was opened to the public several days a week. In 1928 it was bought by Charles Bennion and given, as a plaque in the park describes, 'to be preserved in its a natural state for the quiet enjoyment of the people of Leicestershire'. Charles Bennion set up the charity The Bradgate Park Trust, who still own and manage the park today.

=== Medieval deer park ===
The first written reference to Bradgate Park being a deer park was from 1241. The park was originally enclosed using a bank and ditch topped by vertical pales of oak. These first ditchworks cross the River Lin east of the Little Matlock Gorge. A parker, living in a moated house, was the only occupant, maintaining stocks of deer for the lord of Groby Manor to hunt.The park was greatly extended by the first marquis in the late 15th century, to occupy land previously farmed by both Newtown Linford and the now lost village of Bradgate. Lichen dating of the dry-stone walls suggest that the north and west boundary walls were built in the 17th and early 18th centuries, when Bradgate was still occupied by the earls of Stamford. The walled spinneys are a later feature, built and planted in the early 19th century as coverts for shooting. The park still has herds of red and fallow deer, which probably have an unbroken occupancy since medieval times.

=== Bradgate House ===
Edward Grey's son Sir John Grey of Groby married Elizabeth Woodville, who after John's death married King Edward IV. Their son Thomas Grey, 1st Marquess of Dorset, prepared for building Bradgate House in the late fifteenth century but died before he was able to begin. It was his son Thomas Grey, 2nd Marquess of Dorset, who built Bradgate House, the likely completion date being 1520. It was one of the earliest brick built English country houses and is one of the earliest post-roman use of bricks. The building of house and gardens has been linked with the relocation of the village of BradgateThere is now some confusion over this completion date however, as an older house has been discovered under the visible walls and findings have suggested that Lady Jane Grey, who was not born until 12 October 1537, lived in the older house.

Sir Thomas Grey died in 1530 and was succeeded by his son Henry, the 3rd Marquess of Dorset, who was married to Frances, the daughter of the Duke of Suffolk and Mary Tudor, King Henry VIII's younger sister.

Their daughter Lady Jane Grey was born at Bradgate House probably in October 1537. Notably in July 1553, at the age of fifteen, the Duke of Northumberland (her husband's father) proclaimed her Queen of England and Ireland, in opposition to Mary Tudor. However Mary had more support, and when the Lord Mayor of London proclaimed Mary queen on 19 July, the Duke of Northumberland lost all support, and he, his son, and Lady Jane Grey, the Nine Days Queen, were beheaded for treason.

There is a longstanding tradition that the oak trees of Bradgate were pollarded at the time of Lady Jane's death, in a symbolic "beheading". But pollarding of the trees was a practice that was undertaken then, as before and since as it kept the new growth high up, away from browsing deer and has enabled the ancient trees to reach their great age. It is not known if the estate workers of 1554 attached any particular significance to the practice.

During the 17th century, the house, outbuildings and gardens were updated and extended in preparation for a visit from King William III. It again received modifications in the 20th century, although there is uncertainty around the specific timings of these modifications.

Bradgate house was abandoned in 1739 and was declared ruinous by 1800. After the house was abandoned the park was used as a sporting estate. In fact, there are remnants of a horse racing track still found throughout the park, particularly around Old John tower.

Bradgate House is protected by Historic England as a Scheduled Ancient Monument.

Bradgate House Ruins are open to the public and free to look around on Wednesdays, Saturdays, and Sundays from 11am until 3pm, from April through to October. No booking is required to explore.

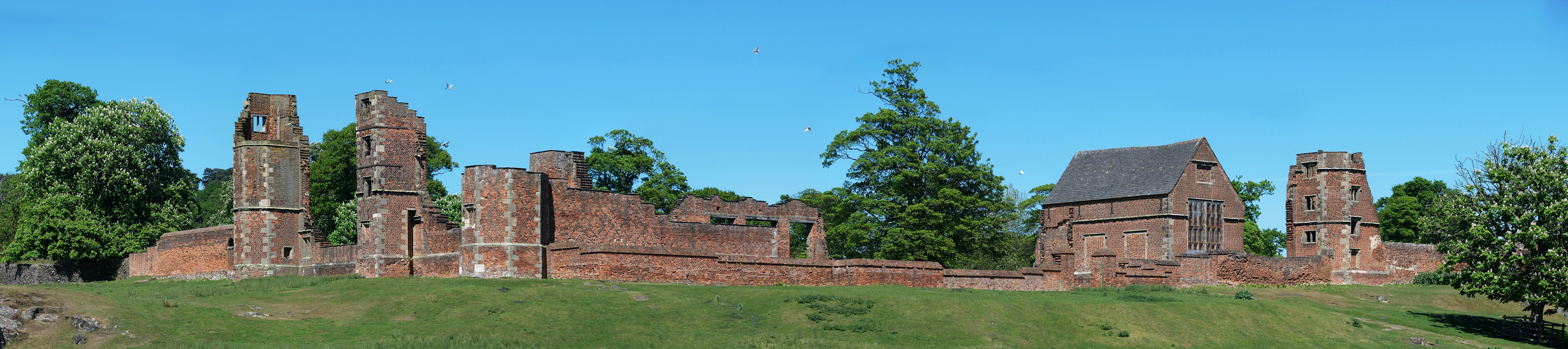
The ruins of Bradgate House, completed around 1520

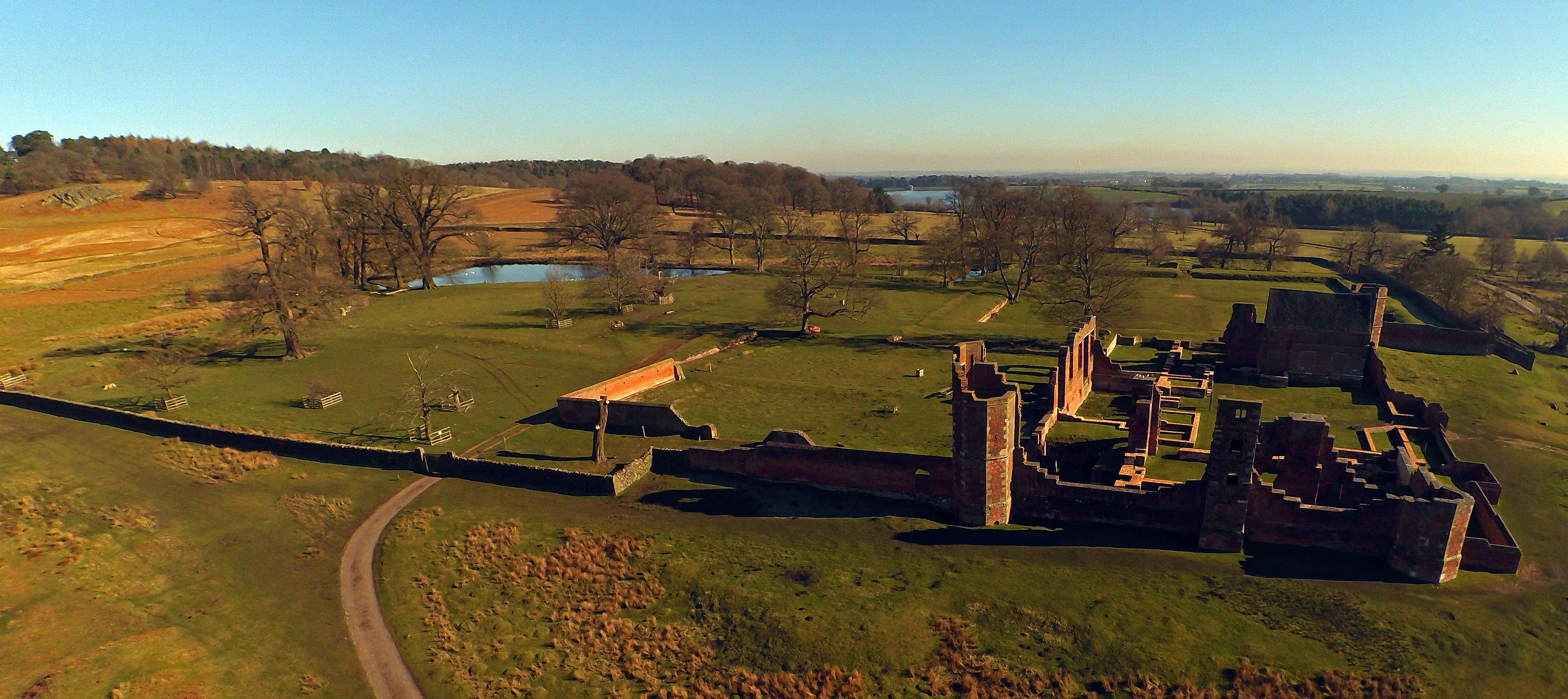
The Bradgate ruins

=== Old John ===
A prominent landmark is the folly known as 'Old John' on the top of the highest hill in the park. Many believe it to be the ‘Icon of Leicestershire’. Built by the Greys in 1784, and designed by Thomas Sketchley of Anstey, the folly is, by local legend, a memorial to John, an estate worker killed in a bonfire accident during celebrations of the 21st birthday of George Grey, the future sixth Earl of Stamford. It was built from local granite to replace an old windmill that once stood on the same hill. The folly also honours his wife and the race track they built on the park.It is reputed that the stonework at the side of the tower was altered to look like a handle, perhaps knowing John's liking of ale. However he was not 21 until 1786, and a map of 1745 names the hill as 'Old John'. The tower was used during the 19th century as a viewing point for the horse-racing practice circuit laid out by the seventh earl.

In 2001, Bradgate Park Trust registered the design of the building as a trademark, and in 2018 told a local artist that she would have to pay them if she continued to sell her paintings of it.

Old John Tower is open to the public every Thursday between 11am-3pm. The easiest way to access the folly is by parking at the Hunts Hill car park and walking a short distance to the top of the hill.

=== The Leicestershire Yeomanry War Memorial ===
The Yeomanry War Memorial sits proudly on the top of the hill adjacent to the Old John Tower. It was erected, in 1924, to commemorate the men of the Leicestershire Yeomanry who died in the Boer War, World War I and World War II. The memorial is a Grade II-listed cenotaph, sitting on the highest point of Bradgate Park. It features a relief cross, wreaths and the regimental crest.

=== Cropston Reservoir ===
Cropston Reservoir was constructed in the south-east corner of the park in 1871, submerging the Head Keeper's house and a substantial area of former parkland. It was Leicester's second reservoir (after Thornton), built in response to the 1831 and 1841 cholera epidemics. The Victorians created shallow waterfalls so that the River Lin can feed into Crospton Reservoir. The water level was raised 2 feet (60 centimetres) in 1887, to increase capacity and the original steam powered beam engines ran until 1956. A number of pools were also constructed along the course of the River Lin through the park, to allow silt to settle before reaching the reservoir. The River Lin is protected due to it being a Site of Scientific Interest.A second, covered reservoir was added on the northern side of the park in the early 1960s.

=== Public park ===
In 1905 the estate was bequeathed on the death of the 7th Earl of Stamford's widow to the earl's niece, Mrs Arthur Duncombe. Limited public access had been allowed while the park was in the hands of the Greys. In 1928, the ancient Deer Park with the ruins of Bradgate House was included in the sale of the whole Grey estate and the Park was bought by local businessman and British United Shoe Machinery founder Charles Bennion who gave it in perpetuity to the people of Leicestershire. Plaques on Old John and the main path through the park commemorate the gift. Bennion's son subsequently added the gift of an adjacent piece of land, and in 1936 the City Council purchased an additional 46.5 acres of land abutting the park.

The nearby Swithland Wood had previously been sold in 1921 to the Leicester timber merchant William Gimson, who began to extract the timber commercially, with the aim of dividing up the land for building plots as it was gradually cleared. Following public concern about the threatened loss of this ancient woodland of importance for its geological, natural history and industrial history features, in 1925 the Rotary Club of Leicester, with the cooperation of William Gimson, bought the whole site of approximately 137 acres (55 ha) for preservation and to provide access to the public for recreation "as a national heritage". The Rotary Club established the Swithland Wood Trust, repaired and renewed the fencing of the area, provided car parking and restored the paths, spending around £6,000 on the original purchase, fencing and landscaping. The Club opened Swithland Wood to the public on August Bank Holiday, 2 August 1925, employing its own staff to manage the Wood and visitor services. In 1928 the Club initiated the annual Bluebell Service in the Wood, in partnership with Swithland Parish Church. On 29 December 1929 the Bradgate Park Charity with trustees nominated by the County Council and the National Trust was established to manage Charles Bennion's purchase and gift of Bradgate Park, with the appropriate senior officers of the Council providing the necessary professional and administrative services, including land management, legal, secretariat and financial support. Although there does not seem to have been a formal opening of Bradgate Park, public access to the Park became available soon afterwards in 1929. In 1931, once the Bradgate Park Trust was fully operational and established, the Rotary Club approached the County Council and trustees about the possibility of merging the two properties and charities under the Bradgate Park trustees and this was completed in 1931. The park is now administered by the Bradgate Park and Swithland Wood Charitable Trust, with trustees nominated by Leicestershire County Council, Leicester City Council and the National Trust. With the consent of the Charity Commission, the charity has adopted the shorter working title of Bradgate Park Trust.

=== Civil parish ===
It was formerly an extra-parochial tract, in 1858 Bradgate Park became a separate civil parish, on 25 March 1884 the parish was abolished and merged with Newtown Linford, Anstey and Ulverscroft. In 1881 the parish had a population of 6.

== Geology ==
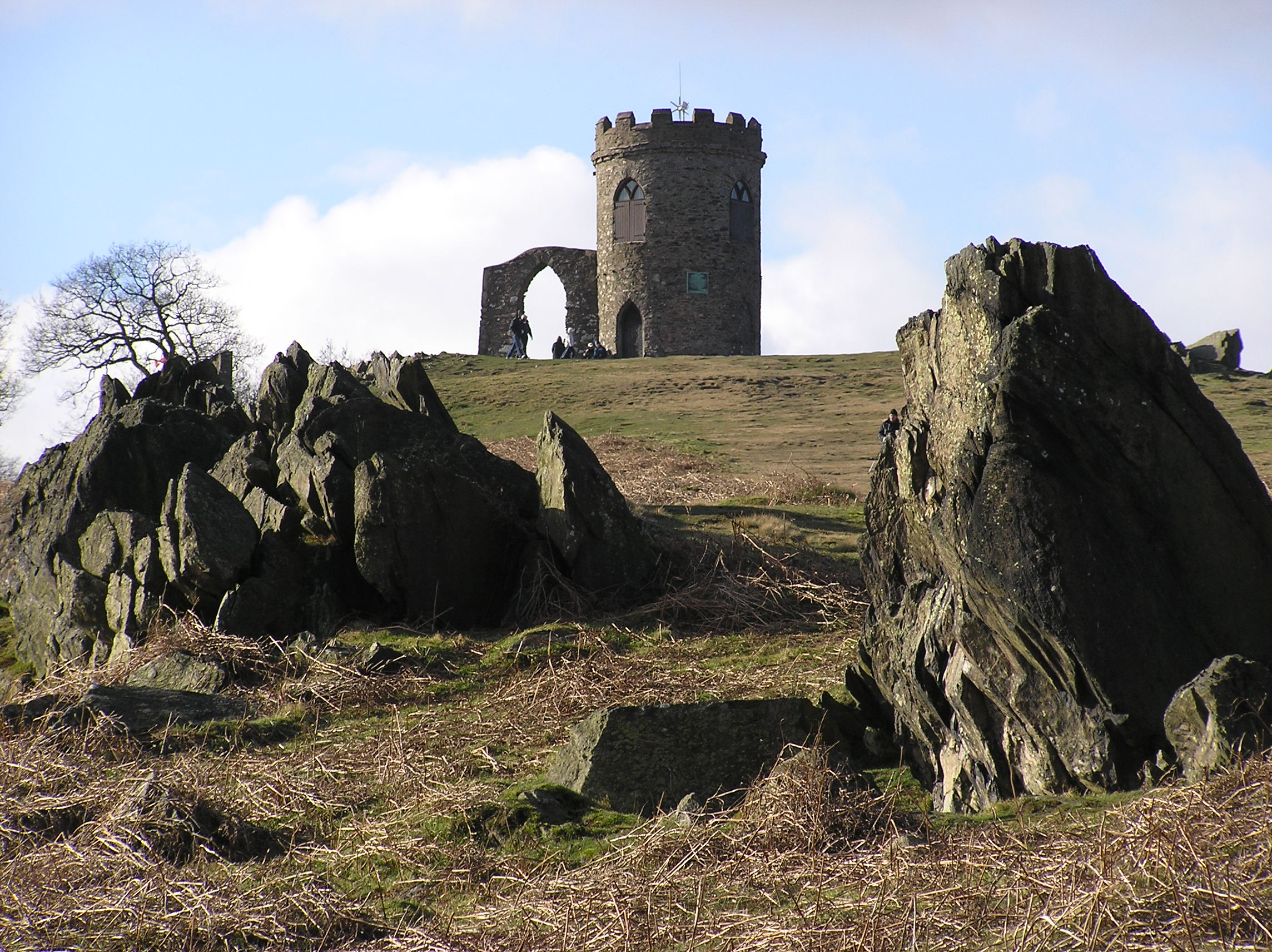
Old John

The geology of Bradgate Park fits within the wider geology of Charnwood Forest where there are many geosites of interest. The visible geology in Bradgate Park ranges from some of the oldest (Precambrian) fossil bearing rocks in England to the youngest (Quaternary). The rock outcrops were created in conditions varying from volcanos rising out of the ocean, to magma flowing deep underground and from tropical deserts to Ice sheets. Within the park the outcrops are widely distributed as hillside crags and outcrops, both along the valley sides of the River Lin and on the hilltop of Old John. They include rocks with some of the oldest known developed forms of fossil animal life in Western Europe.

=== Precambrian rocks ===
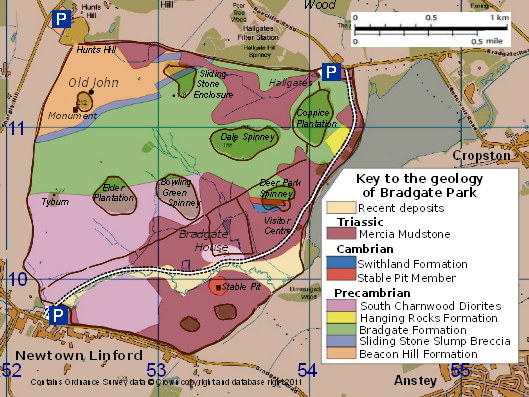
Map of the geology of Bradgate Park

The Precambrian outcrops include four 'type-members' of the Charnian Supergroup, formed some 560 million years ago, when much of England was still under water. Bradgate is one of the few areas of Britain where these ancient basement rocks can be seen at the surface. The oldest of the Charnian rocks within Bradgate Park are the rocks nearest the Old John and memorial summits. This is the Beacon Hill Formation. It appears to have formed in deep water, out of sediments of volcanic ash and other pyroclastic material, which were then subject to slumping and submarine flows, to create rocks with various degrees of stratification. The volcano itself was in the north-west of Charnwood Forest, and the whole area was in the southern tropic, off the coast of the continent of Gondwana. (A modern parallel might be the sea surrounding Montserrat.) The tectonism from Gondwana created the rocks at Bradgate Park today. Many rocks around the park contain volcanic material. Some of the layers show great variation, showing how an initial volcanic eruption would result in larger sediments rapidly settling to create course-grained tuff, followed by settling of much finer material to form much smoother dust-tuffs – smooth light-grey to creamy coloured rocks seen to the north of Old John. The various layers were subsequently deeply buried, subject to vast periods of mountain-building (orogeny), heat, pressure and erosion of overlying material, to expose the hard, jagged outcrops seen in the photograph.

Overlying the Beacon Hill Formation, but found a little further down the hillside to the south, are the Bradgate Formation beds, the most notable of which is the Sliding Stone Slump Breccia rocks. Forming a line of crags below Old John, these are laminated mudstones, with layers of sandstone, mainly of volcanic origin. The newer layers of the Precambrian rocks are from 247 million years ago and contain red and silty mudstone. These are called the Mercia Mudstone Group. In fact, the bricks of Bradgate House are said to be made from the Mercia Mudstone Group rocks. The beds are substantially warped, contorted and folded. Many of the more intricate folds and 'sag' patterns are thought to have occurred while the sediments were unconsolidated and water saturated. Suggested causes for these include slumping, earth tremors and fault-movements, trapped water or gases and volcanic bomb impacts. Outcrops of other rocks of the Bradgate Formation are found further down the slope. These are younger than and stratigraphically above the breccia, but the uplift from ancient mountain-building, the dip of the beds and erosion of overlying rocks mean that the younger rocks are encountered at progressively lower altitudes.

The youngest of the Precambrian rocks are the South Charnwood Diorites. These are known locally as granite, (geologically they were formerly described as markfieldite) and are quarried commercially at Groby and Markfield. These are igneous intrusions of magma which formed within the existing Beacon Hill and Bradgate Formations. They cooled slowly and at great depth to create their large crystalline structure, and were subsequently exposed by erosion of the uplifted rocks above. The Diorites are the cliffs and blocks seen along the Lin valley, through the so-called Little Matlock Gorge and near Bradgate House. They are massive blocky outcrops made up of crystals of feldspar, quartz and mafic minerals.

=== Cambrian rocks ===
An area of rock overlooking Cropston Reservoir is of Hanging Rocks Formation, the only other example being at Hangingstone Hills, near the Outwoods, 4 km to the north. It is unclear if this is late Precambrian or early Cambrian. It is distinguished by conglomerates with well-rounded volcanic pebbles mostly 5–15 mm but some up to 100 mm in diameter, which may have been smoothed on a volcanic shoreline before being washed, along with much finer material, into deeper water. These are younger than the Bradgate Formation, but again at a lower altitude. A possibly explanation is that it formed in a channel cut into the existing sea floor, but a preferred conclusion is that movement along fault-lines has relocated it relative to its surrounding rocks. The relationship between the different outcrops in Bradgate are made more obscure by the overlying peat and Boulder clay, which mean the contacts between adjacent stratigraphic sequences are nowhere exposed.

Previously classed as precambrian, but now accepted as early Cambrian are the Brand Group of rocks which include Swithland Slate, locally important as a source of roof slates and gravestones. The nearby Swithland Wood has extensive outcrops and was one of the principal quarry areas until the mid 19th century. Rocks close in age to the slate can be seen in the 'stable pit', a medieval quarry near Bradgate House. This outcrop is part of the Brand Group and is known as the Stable Pit Member, a Quartz arenite rock with a smooth glassy appearance. A metre-wide dyke of diorite also runs through the exposed rocks of the quarry, possibly of late Ordovician age, which places it at a similar age to the Mountsorrel granite formations.

=== Triassic rocks ===
During the Triassic period, some 350 million years after those ancient rocks were formed, they were exposed due to the erosion of the rocks above. By this point they were part of the Pangea supercontinent and desert conditions resulted in an accumulation of windblown Loess, which now forms the Mercia Mudstone Group. With the subsequent sinking of the East Midlands crust, these deposits became waterlogged and formed into red clay. It is this clay that was used to make the bricks for Bradgate House. The mudstone is only visible where it was extracted, across the stream from Bradgate House. However, it covers much of the valley floor around and beneath Cropston Reservoir, – demonstrating that the present Lin valley was also there 220 million years ago.

=== Quaternary deposits ===
The most recent deposits are from the last ice age. Bradgate Park and its surrounding areas were heavily overlain in the (geologically) recent past by glacial deposits of Boulder Clay. The Quaternary period includes the last ice age. As the ice melted, some 10,000 years ago, the solid material within the ice settled over the 'natural' rocks below. This material includes unsorted clay and sand particles, small and large pebbles and large stones and boulders. It travelled great distances within the ice sheets and glaciers, so individual rocks, whether on the ground, or within the great lengths of stone walls of the Park, may be local stone, or may be a specimen from northern Britain or even from northern Europe.

=== Precambrian fossils ===
Bradgate Park is known for having some of the oldest fossils on earth. The fossils at Bradgate and in other nearby Charnian rocks are the only known Precambrian fossils in Western Europe. Until 1957 it had been thought that complex life forms and perhaps life itself began with the Cambrian Period and that all rocks older than this developed in a world without plants or animals. The 1957 discoveries, by Roger Mason, in rocks near Woodhouse Eaves, subsequently named in his honour as Charnia masoni, required a re-evaluation of when life began. They were the first macrofossil to be found in the world known to be Precambrian. It also resulted in the re-classification of other rocks in Southern Australia and Newfoundland, which have similar fossil marks. At Bradgate Park there are some 50 known examples. They mainly take the form of two-dimensional impressions of fronds and disks and have at various times been described as seaweed, jelly fish, corals or sea anemones. Typically, the impressions are 1mm deep or less, so they are often hard to spot. These fossils can only be seen when the sun is low during the autumn months They are now described as belonging to the Ediacara biota, with no consensus on which kingdom, current or extinct, they should be placed. The Bradgate examples include Bradgatia linfordensis and Charniodiscus concentricus as well as Charnia masoni. Because of the risk of vandalism and damage, specific locations of these fossils are not disclosed and those wishing to investigate them should first of all seek the permission of the Bradgate Park Trust. None of the rocks in Bradgate Park should be chipped, hammered, or otherwise sampled, replicated or removed.

The presence of precambrian fossil species, alongside the assemblage of ancient oak trees and rich flora and fauna, was one of the reasons for the 2024 designation of Bradgate Park and Swithland Wood as a National Nature Reserve, as one of the King's Series of newly designated NNRs to mark the coronation of King Charles III.

== Flora and fauna ==
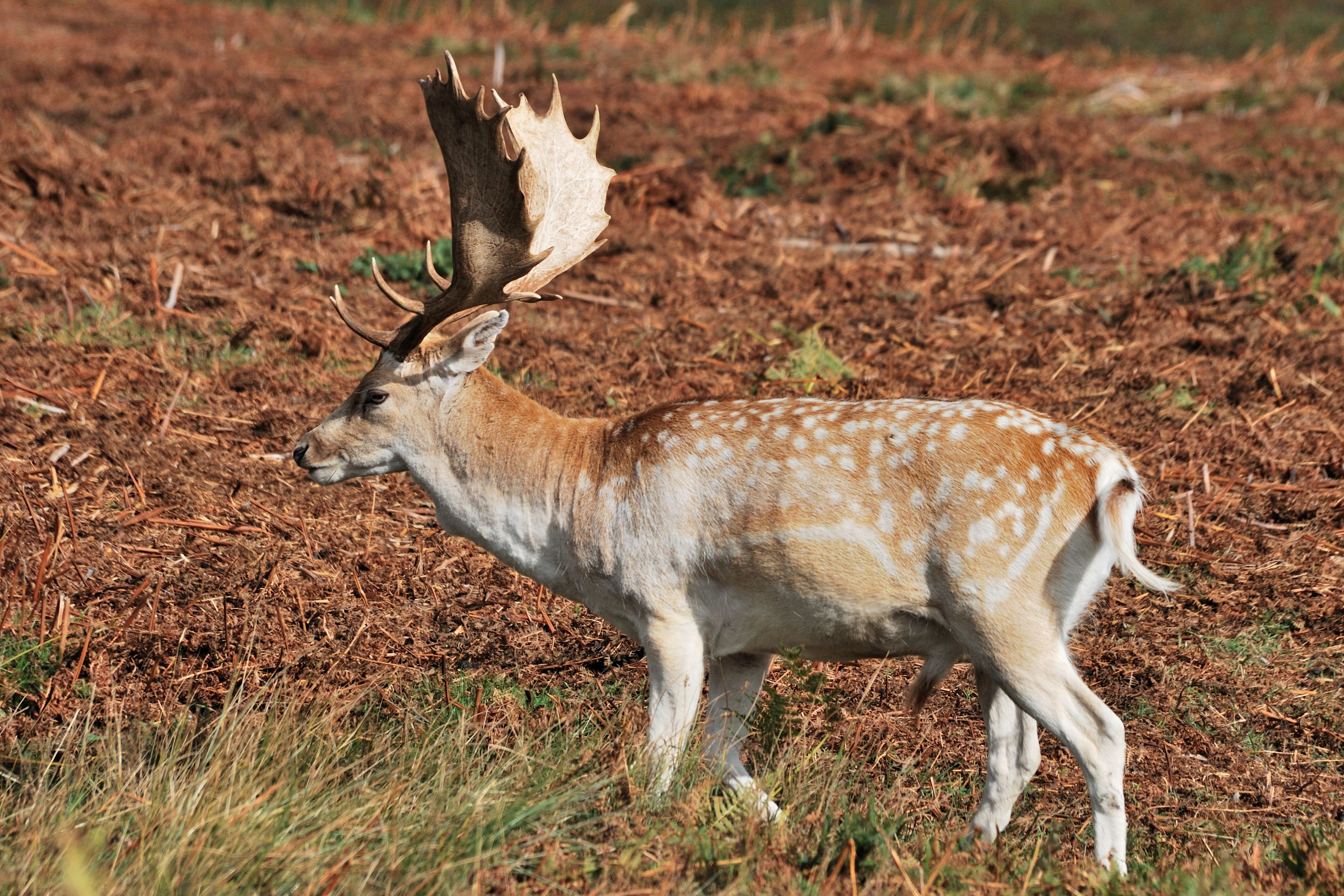
Male fallow deer in Bradgate Park

The landscape is rocky moorland with a covering of coarse grass and bracken. Several spinneys of woodland (pine and mixed deciduous) are enclosed by stone walls and are not accessible to the public. There are a number of magnificent specimens of ancient oaks several hundreds of years old. The Bradgate Park Trust has worked on conserving some of their historic trees by fencing off 12 of them, in 2026, in order to prevent soil compaction beneath the trees. In 2025, the park’s oldest Oak tree (which is still standing at 825 years old) was shortlisted for the top 10 for the Woodland Trust’s Tree of the Year award in 2025. The English Oak tree would have already been an impressive size when Lady Jane Grey was born in 1537. This history played a large part in it’s shortlist. The park is home to herds of red deer and fallow deer. It has a total herd size of around 550 deer, with the vast majority of them being fallow deer. The deers roam freely throughout the park and mix with visitors, however, visitors are told to keep their distance and to not feed them. Birdlife is profuse – the reservoir attracts many species of wildfowl, as does the river and the spinneys provide secluded nesting areas for many other species, including large colonies of rooks. Species such as yellowhammer, reed bunting, skylark and meadow pipit are a common sight in the open areas of the park. Deadly nightshade is allowed to grow within the ruins of Bradgate House, having been originally established there during World War II by Leicester Polytechnic's School of Pharmacy for medicinal purposes.

Following a fire in April 2017, the owners Bradgate Trust advised that all visitors are expected to be alert to the risk of causing fire, though another fire in June destroyed one of the ancient oaks.

=== Dogs ===
As of 2015 deer numbers were around 450 but concerns have been raised about dogs chasing deer. Trust notices displayed at the entrances now advise that dogs must be on a lead in specified areas near the main footpath. Dogs are allowed off lead in around 75% of the area of the park, so long as they are kept under effective control and do not worry the deer. However, dogs must be kept on the lead in the lower areas of the park as that is where a lot of the deer are. The Daily Telegraph highlighted Bradgate in an article referencing the busybodies charter though it failed to mention the deer.

== Café and information centres ==
In July 2016 a visitor centre opened in the Deer Barn buildings off the main path east of Bradgate House in addition to the existing cafe. The geology section features details of the park's formation during its stages of volcanism, glacial erosion and inhabitation by Ediacara biota. It also shows the tracks of a later land based lizard. The archaeology section features work by Leicester University beginning in 2014 and includes evidence of Creswellian sites from 14,500 years ago. The visitor centre has free entry and it tells the story of the Bradgate Estate and all of the park’s history.

The Deer Barns café in the centre of the park is open 7 days a week (Monday-Friday 9:30-4:30 and Saturday and Sunday 10am-5pm) and offers sandwiches, toasties, jacket potatoes and other cold snacks and hot and cold drinks.

There is also a café at the Newtown Linford car park which is operated externally as of 2021.

== Access ==
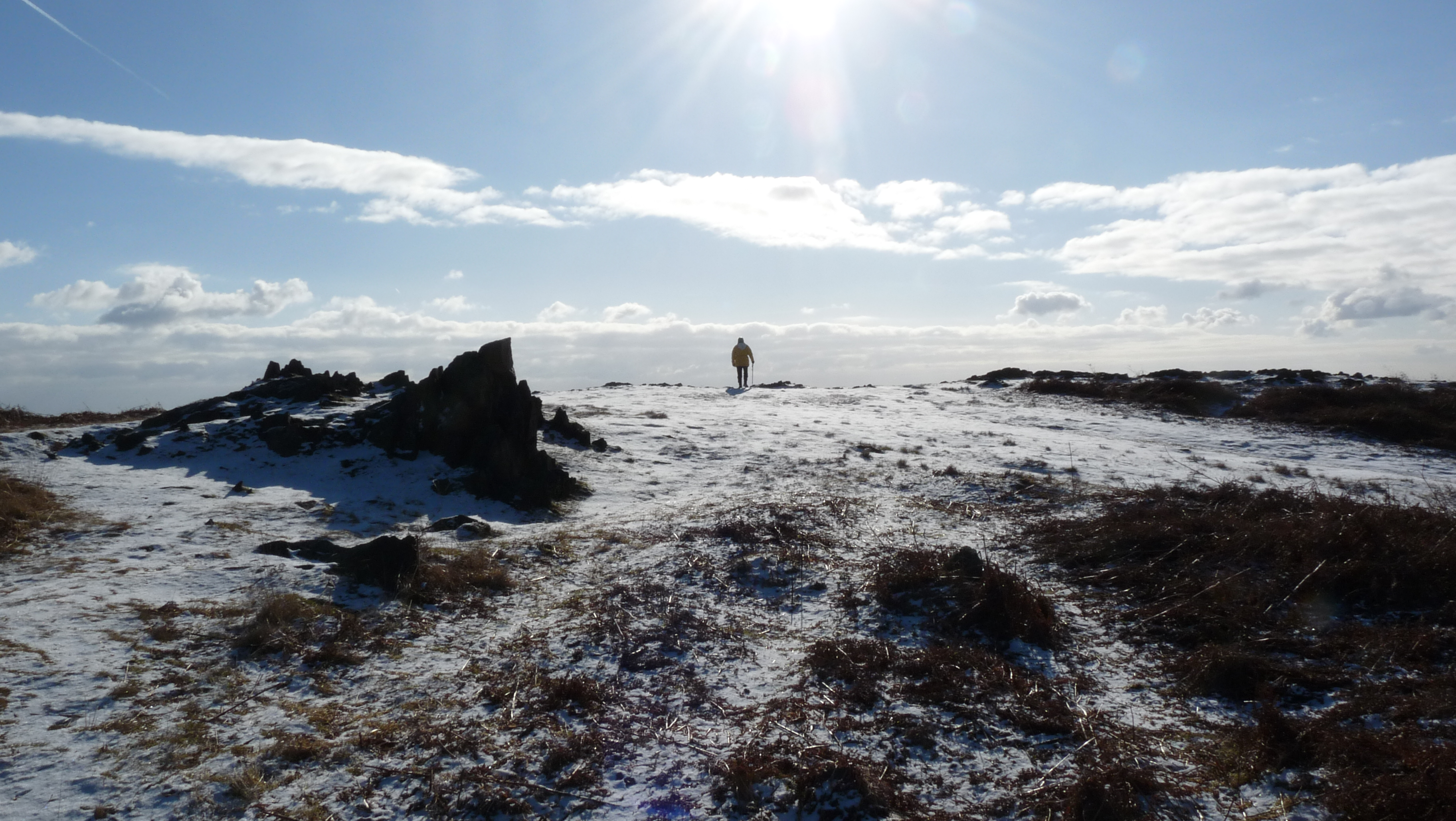
Sunshine across a winter scene.

=== Car ===
Pay&Display car parks are operated at the Hallgates entrance and Hunts Hill (at the top of the park near Old John). At Newtown Linford an automatic number plate recognition (ANPR) system is in operation and visitors pay on exit. The park is open from dawn until dusk all year round, though the public footpaths which run through the area mean that in practice the park is always accessible.

=== Bus ===
A limited service LC15 operates by the Newtown Linford entrance Monday to Saturday and Arriva 29B operates an infrequent Sunday service both serve Leicester City Centre and Coalville. The 154 Centrebus route can be used to access Bradgate Park Monday-Friday from the Hallgates entrance as it stops in Cropston.

=== Walking ===
One path is directly opposite the bus stop on Link Road, between Cropston Road and Hazelhead Road. The path is signposted from Link Road and crosses several fields before entering the park proper. Another route, which joins the main path, is accessible from the edge of the village, adjacent to the last houses on Bradgate Road.

=== Cycling ===
The park is within easy cycling distance from the city centre of Leicester and bikes are allowed to be ridden through the park on the main tarmac carriageway.
