= Woodhouse, Leicestershire =

Village in Leicestershire, England

Coordinates: 52°44′1.00″N 1°12′6.00″W

Woodhouse
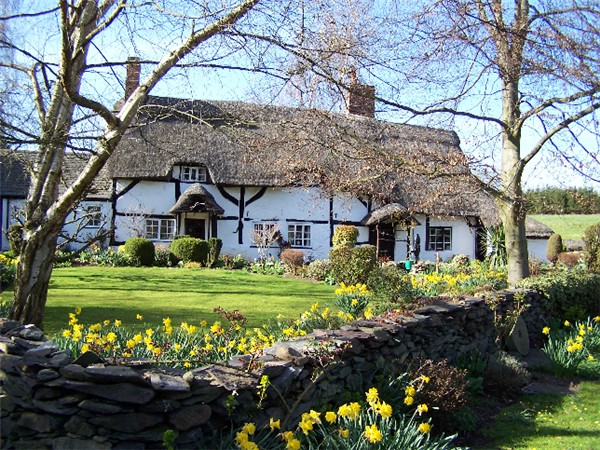
- 'Pest Cottage' in Woodhouse, former home of Thomas Rawlins who fled London during the plague of 1665 and settled in the village.

- Location within Leicestershire
- Population: 2,319
- District: Charnwood
- Shire county: Leicestershire
- Region: East Midlands
- Country: England
- Sovereign state: United Kingdom
- Post town: LOUGHBOROUGH
- Postcode district: LE12
- Police: Leicestershire
- Fire: Leicestershire
- Ambulance: East Midlands
- UK Parliament: Mid Leicestershire

Woodhouse, often known to locals as Old Woodhouse, is a small village and civil parish in the heart of Charnwood, England. The population of the civil parish at the 2011 census was 2,319, including around 300 term-time boarders at the Defence College. The parish includes the larger village of Woodhouse Eaves. The parish of Woodhouse was formed in 1844. The village is located between the larger Woodhouse Eaves and Quorn villages, the village contains a mixture of small cottages and large modern houses. It is a commuter village for both Leicester and Loughborough, as well as further afield.

Beaumanor Hall, ancestral home of the Herrick family, was used as a listening station during the war, and intercepted signals intelligence for Bletchley Park. The Hall is now owned by Leicestershire County Council and is used as an educational base with outdoor activities.

In 2005 Welbeck College moved to the village, on the edge of the grounds of Beaumanor Hall.

The village has 130 homes and around 400 people living in it.

The oldest part of the village is the church, St Mary-in-the-Elms, which dates back to the 15th century with 17th- and 19th-century renovations. On the side of the church near to where the Herrick family are buried are a number of old indentations showing where arrows were sharpened for hunting. The village was originally linear; however, the army barracks created a more nucleated village with more modern housing than the typical Georgian architecture seen throughout.

The village has no services and relies on surrounding villages and towns for shops etc. The village is low on the settlement hierarchy.

== The Martin family ==
The most famous past residents of Woodhouse include the Martin family, formerly of Anstey, Leicestershire, who gave their name to the Anstey Martin High School and were once an extremely powerful family in Leicester. They left Anstey and moved into the Brand. Col Sir Robert Andrew Martin, who lived at The Brand, was Lord Lieutenant of Leicestershire from 1965 to 1989 and a distinguished soldier.
