= Woodhouse Eaves =

Village in Leicestershire, England

Coordinates: 52.72231°N 1.218796°W

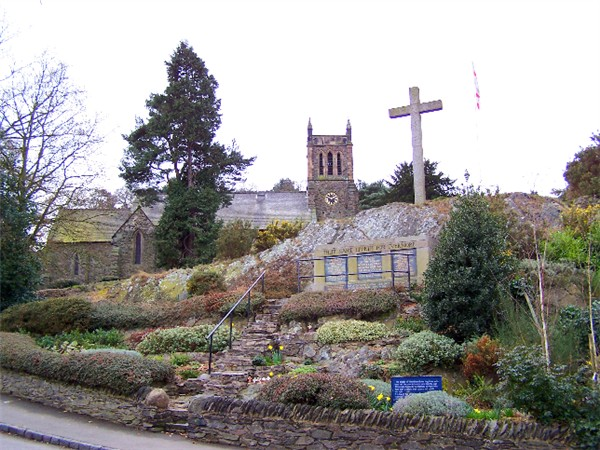
- Woodhouse Eaves church and war monument

- Location within Leicestershire
- Population: 1,693 (2018 census)
- OS grid reference: SK529140
- District: Charnwood
- Shire county: Leicestershire
- Region: East Midlands
- Country: England
- Sovereign state: United Kingdom
- Post town: Loughborough
- Postcode district: LE12
- Dialling code: 01509
- Police: Leicestershire
- Fire: Leicestershire
- Ambulance: East Midlands
- UK Parliament: Mid Leicestershire

Woodhouse Eaves is a village in the Borough of Charnwood, Leicestershire, England.

Nearby are the villages of Quorn, Swithland, and Newtown Linford. Breakback Road leads from the village to Nanpantan and Loughborough.

The church of St Paul is a granite building with a slate roof, constructed to the designs of William Railton in 1837 and extended by Ewan Christian in 1880.

== Notable people ==
- Former Nottingham Forest, Leicester City, Southampton and England goalkeeper Peter Shilton lived in Woodhouse Eaves.
- Tennis player Katie Boulter was born in Woodhouse Eaves.
