= Outwoods, Leicestershire =

Park in Leicestershire, England

Coordinates: 52.742°N 1.240°W

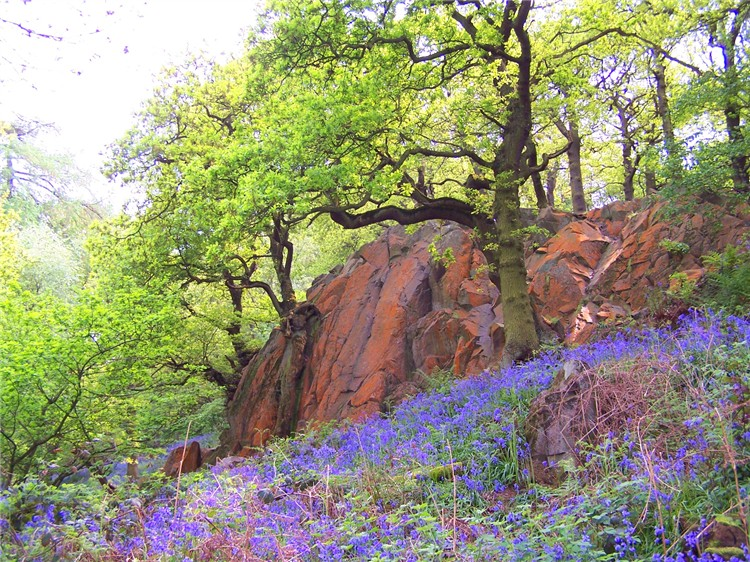
The Outwoods in spring

The Outwoods is a 40 hectares (99 acres) ancient wood and visitor attraction overlooking Loughborough and the Soar Valley in Leicestershire, England. It has rare rock outcrops, many species of woodland plants and substantial wildlife, and it is part of Beacon Hill, Hangingstone and Outwoods Site of Special Scientific Interest. Situated within Charnwood Forest the Outwoods stands on some of the oldest exposed rocks in Britain, being formed in the Precambrian era.

The Outwoods is open all year round and the car park and toilets are open from approximately 7 am until dusk. Adjacent to the Outwoods is the smaller Jubilee Wood and close by is Beacon Hill.
