= Beacon Hill, Leicestershire =

Highest hill in Leicestershire

Coordinates: 52.72846°N 1.24772°W

Beacon Hill
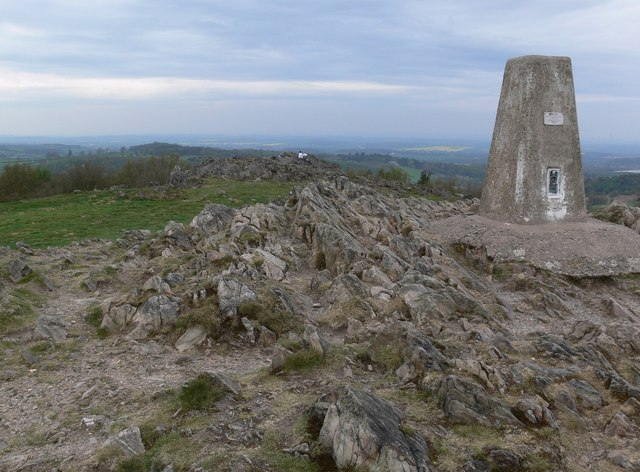

Highest point
- Elevation: 248 m (814 ft)
- Prominence: c. 57 metres (187 ft)

Geography
- Location: Charnwood Forest, England
- OS grid: SK509148
- Topo map: OS Landranger 129

Map of Beacon Hill Country Park

Beacon Hill, near Loughborough, in Leicestershire, England, is a popular country park. It is one of several beacon hills in the United Kingdom. It is part of Beacon Hill, Hangingstone and Outwoods Site of Special Scientific Interest.

== Description ==
The park consists of over 135 hectares (330 acres) of grassland and woodland and offers recreational walking, and some short climbs. With a maximum height of 248 metres (814 ft), it is the second highest point in Leicestershire after Bardon Hill, although the OS map shows Birch Hill, which is near Copt Oak to be 254m.

An extinct volcano, in Whitwick, 4 miles (6 km) to the west, was responsible for the fine-grained igneous rocks that the hill consists of. Beacon Hill was the site of a Bronze Age hill fort. Today a toposcope indicates landmarks which can be seen from the summit. These include Lincoln Cathedral and the hills of the Peak District.

Ratcliffe-on-Soar Power Station is aligned so that, seen from the summit, only two of its eight cooling towers are visible.

On a clear day Belvoir Castle can be seen as well as the hills in the Peak District. Derby, Nottingham, and the tower of Lincoln Cathedral can be seen with a pair of binoculars. Loughborough is seen below the hill as is Beaumanor Hall. You can also hear and see steam trains on the Great Central Railway which has stations at Loughborough, Quorn and Woodhouse.

It was featured on the 2005 TV programme Seven Natural Wonders as one of the wonders of the Midlands. There are some very interesting rocks on the summit.

Nearby are two small woods both accessible to the public. Jubilee Wood is 2 miles (3 km) north-west of the lower Beacon hill car park on the Woodhouse Eaves to Nanpantan road and the Outwoods which is adjacent to Jubilee Wood.

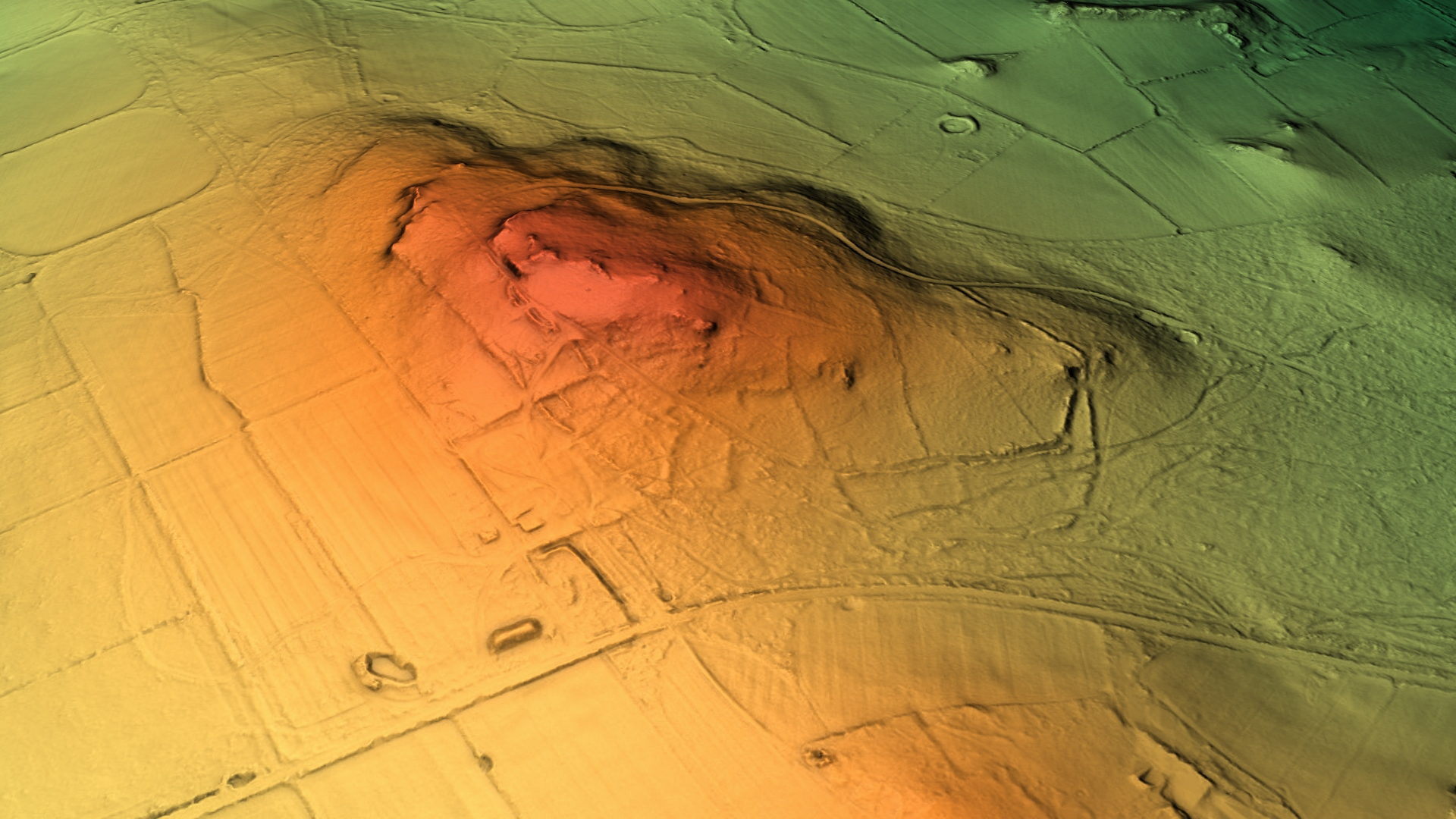
3D view of the digital terrain model

The park has been awarded the Green Flag Award.

== Native tree collection ==
The park contains a collection of native trees, first planted in 1996. Many of the trees are labelled, and there are several boxes that provide audio commentary on the biology and historical interest of selected tree species at the push of a button.

== Access ==
There are car parks top and bottom, accessible from Beacon Road or Breakback Road, with a pay on exit barrier system, accepting cash and card. For access by public transport, buses between Leicester and Loughborough via Anstey serve Woodhouse Eaves. Service 154 operated by Centrebus runs Monday to Friday and Kinchbus service 123 on Saturdays.

== Features and activities ==
Beacon Hill Country Park has picnic and play areas, a cafe at the lower car park, walking routes, a multi-use track suitable for pedestrians / horses / bicycles, permanent orienteering markers. Each August the park opens for a country fair.

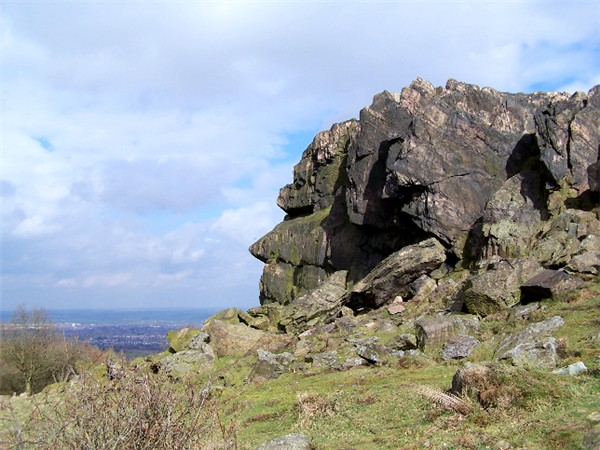
Old man of the Beacon

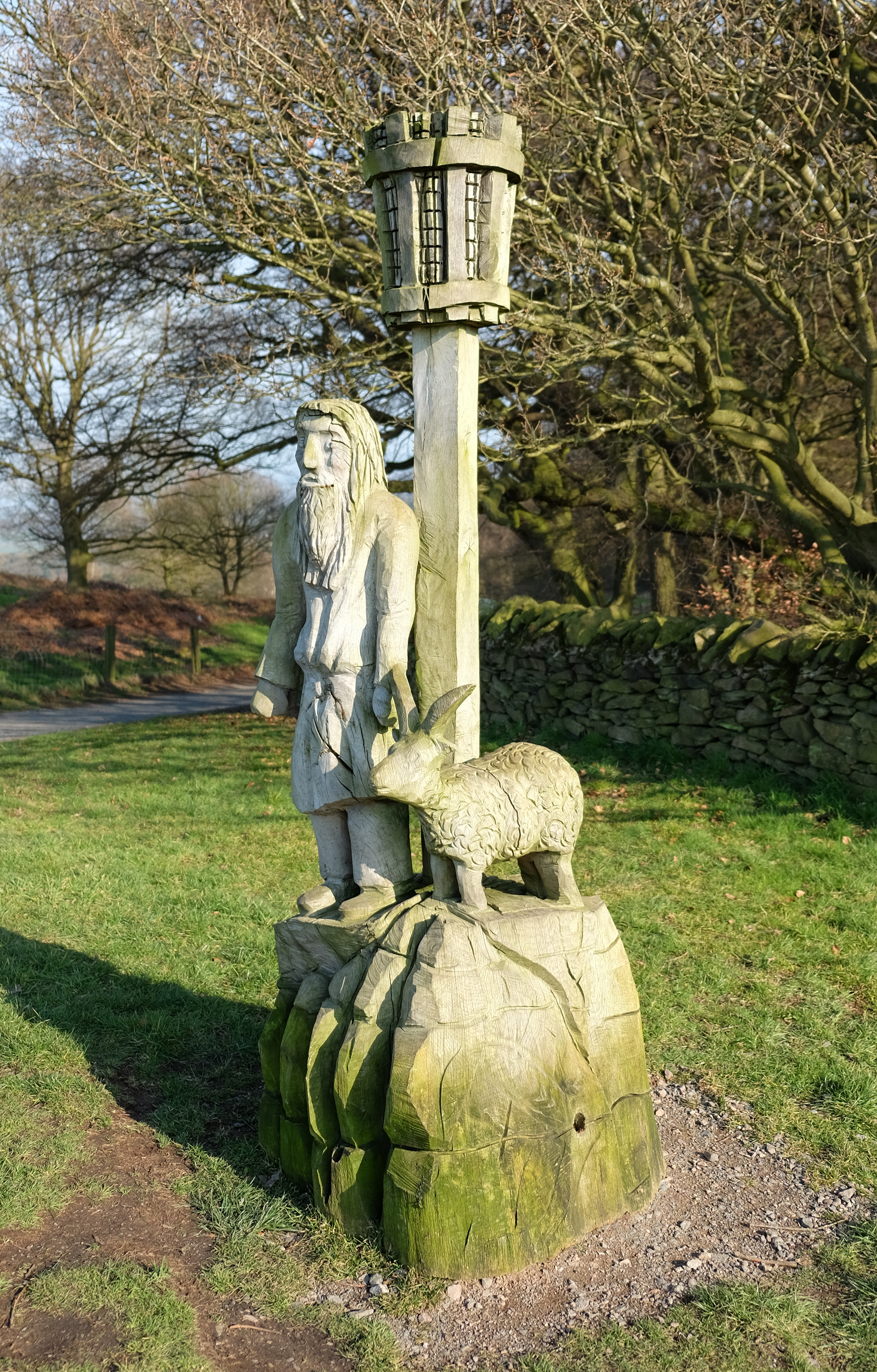
The Shepherd and the Ram chainsaw sculpture by Peter Leadbeater on Beacon Hill

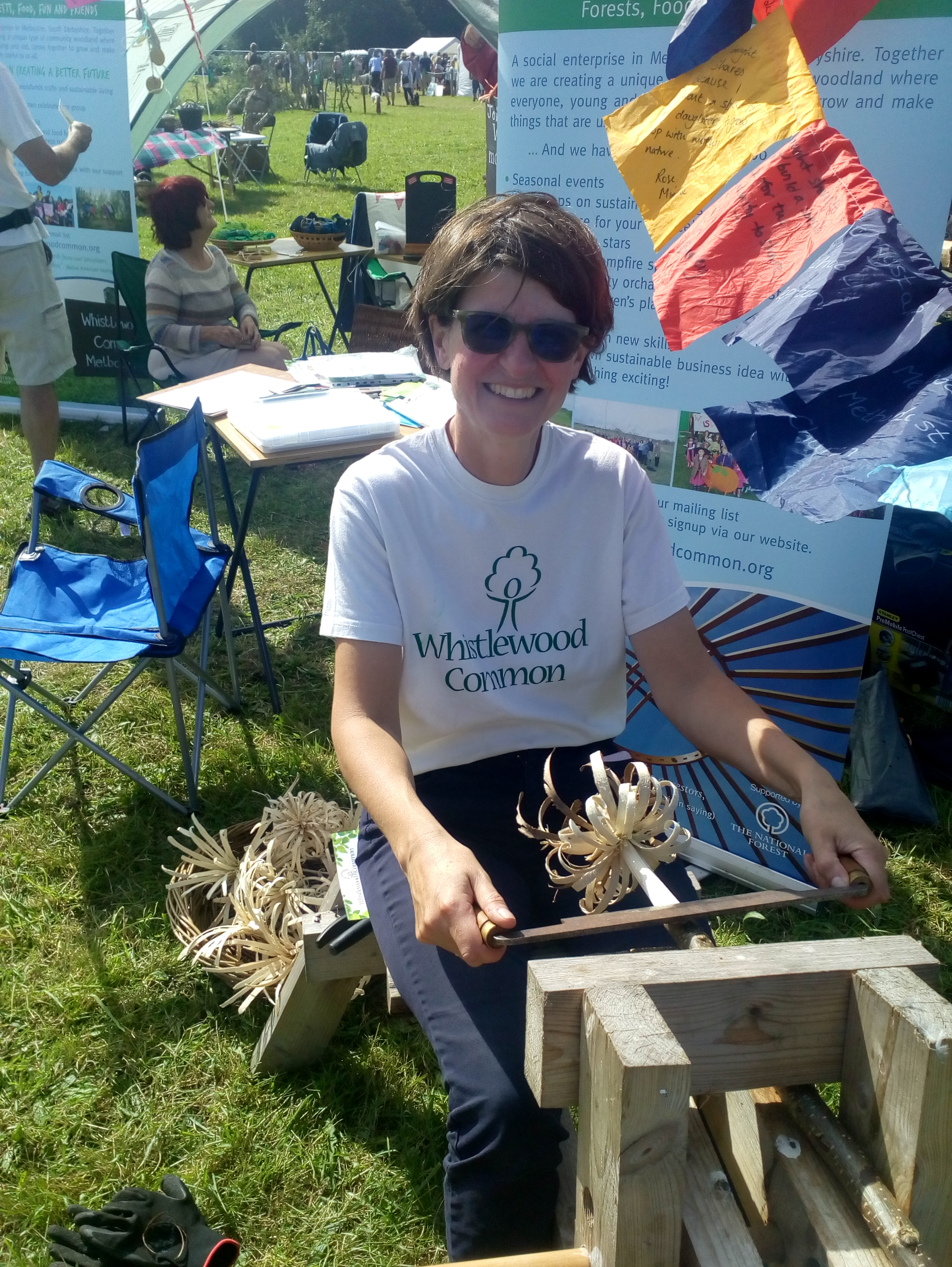
Wood craft demonstration at the Country Fair

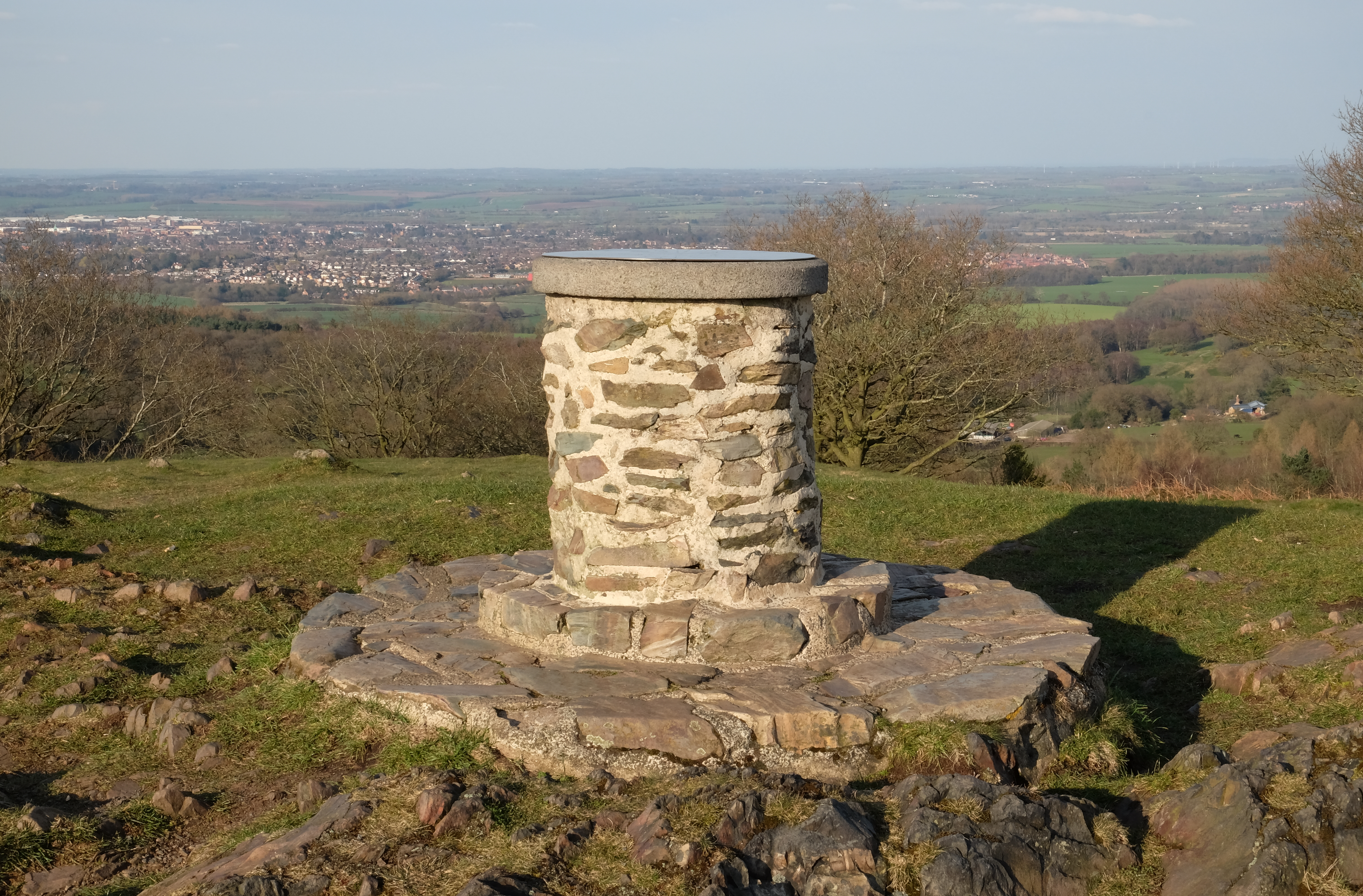
The toposcope on the top

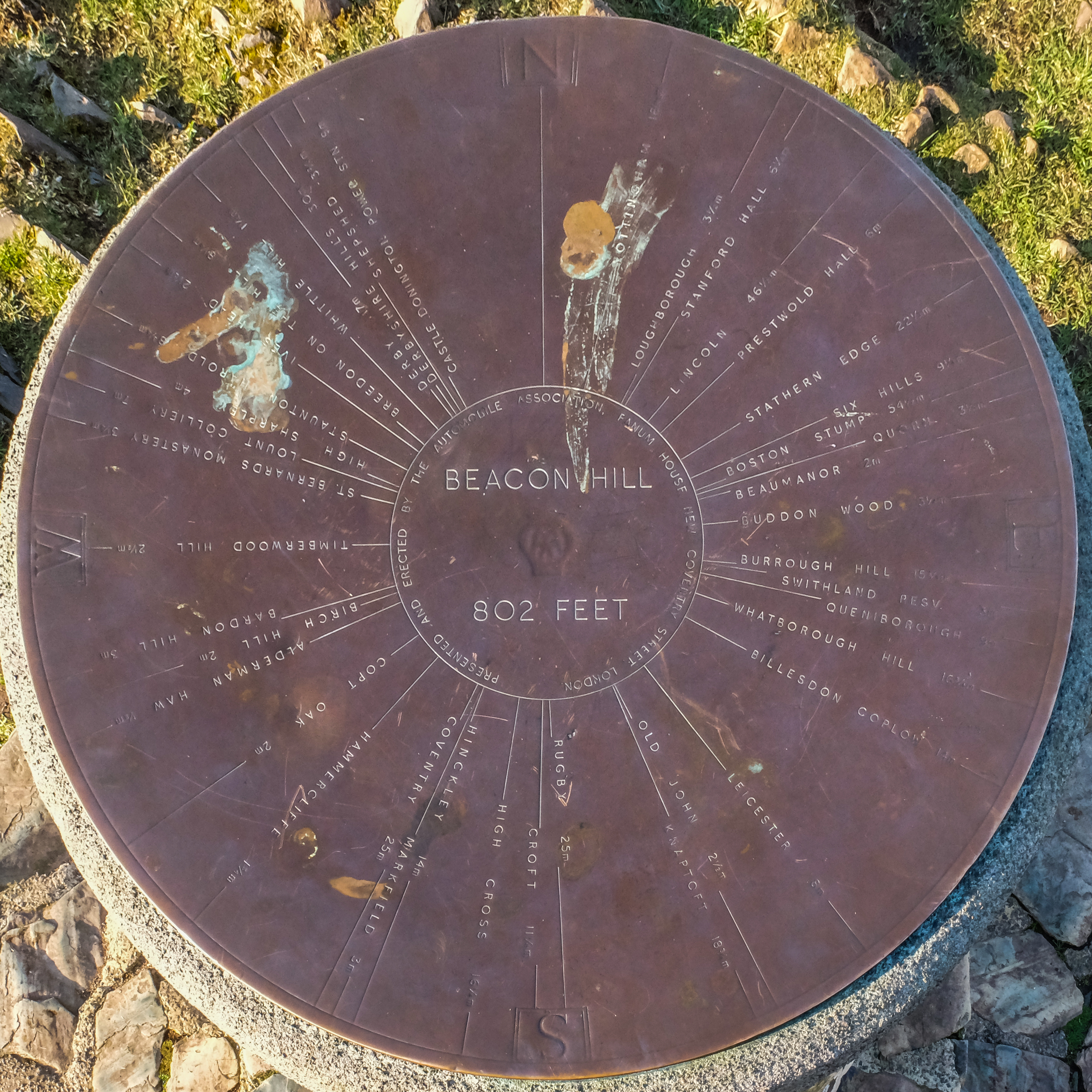
The plate on the toposcope

== See also ==
- Beacon Hill (disambiguation)
