= Leicester Museum & Art Gallery =

Museum in Leicester, England

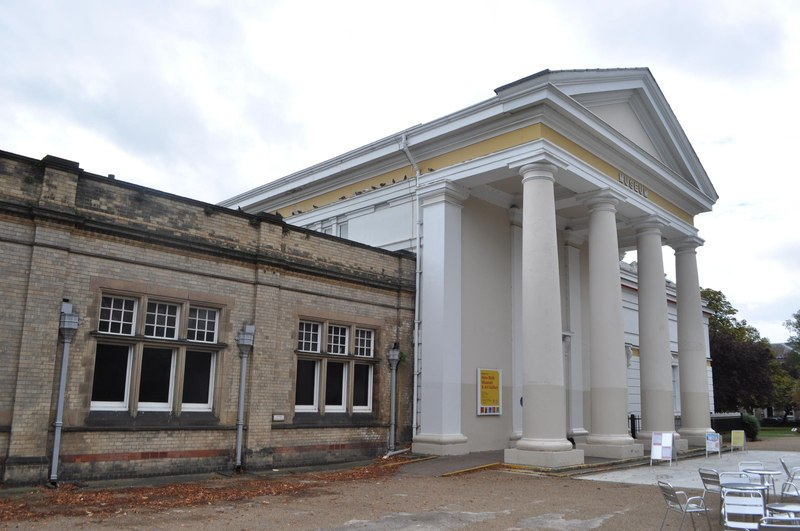
- Former name: New Walk Museum
- Established: 1849; 177 years ago
- Location: New Walk, Leicester, England
- Coordinates: 52.628954°N 1.127765°W
- Curator: Mark A. Simmons
- Architect: Joseph Hansom
- Owner: Leicester City Council
- Parking: On site (no charge)
- Website: Leicester Museum & Art Gallery

The Leicester Museum & Art Gallery (until 2020, New Walk Museum and Art Gallery) is a museum on New Walk in Leicester, England, not far from the city centre. It opened in 1849 as one of the first public museums in the United Kingdom. Leicester Museum & Art Gallery contains displays of science, history and art, both international and local. The original building was designed by Joseph Hansom, designer of the hansom cab. It has been expanded several times, most recently in 2011.

== Major exhibits ==
Permanent exhibits include dinosaurs, an Egyptian area, minerals of Leicestershire, the first Charnia fossil identified nearby, and a wildspace area featuring stuffed animals from around the world.

=== Dinosaurs and fossils ===
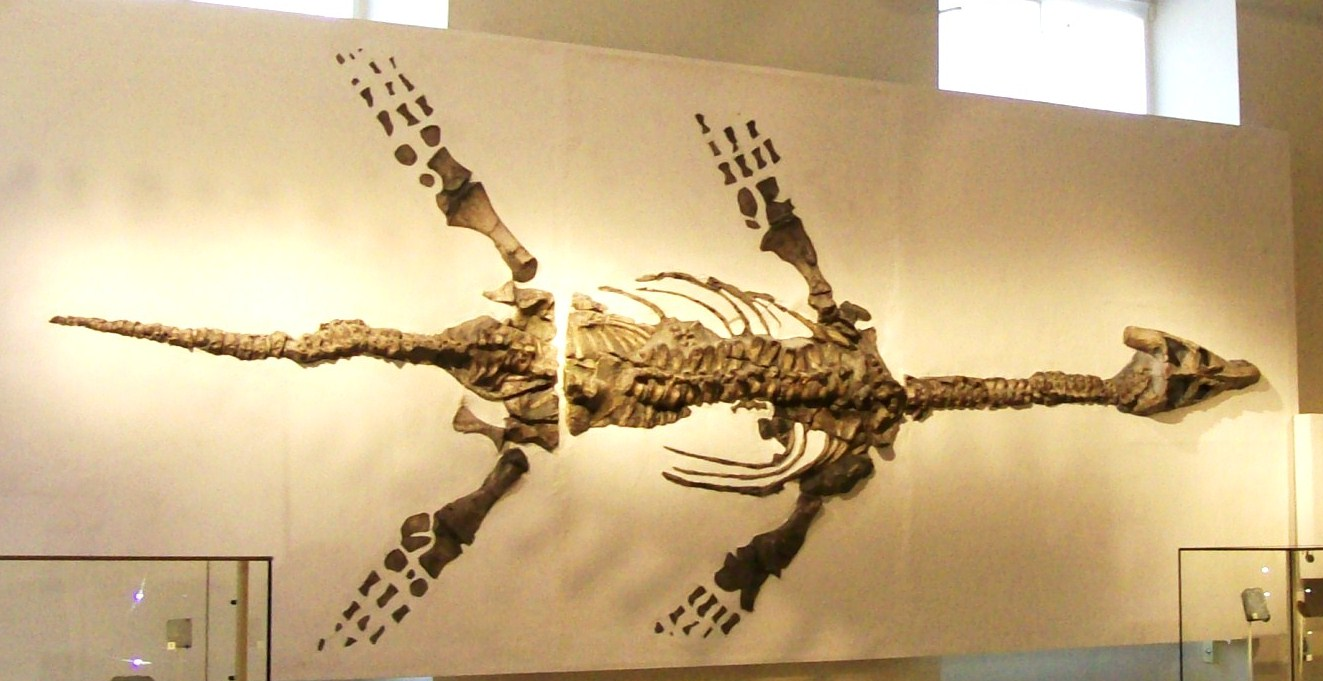
The "Barrow Kipper", a plesiosaur skeleton excavated at Barrow upon Soar

Leicester Museum & Art Gallery has a significant collection of extinct lifeforms. Two Mesozoic reptile skeletons are permanently on display – a cetiosaur found in Rutland, and a plesiosaur from Barrow upon Soar.

The Rutland Dinosaur, affectionately nicknamed George, is a specimen of Cetiosaurus oxoniensis. The 15 metres (49 ft) dinosaur, which is among the most complete sauropod skeletons in the world, was discovered in June 1968, in the Williamson Cliffe quarry near Little Casterton in Rutland. The skeletal remains have been in the museum since 1975; the majority of the bones in the display are replicas of the originals, which are too fragile to be used. The Rutland Dinosaur featured on an episode of Blue Peter, and was opened by Blue Peter's Janet Ellis in 1985.

The Barrow Kipper, named after the flattened fish, is a skeleton of an unidentified plesiosaur discovered in Barrow upon Soar in 1851. Originally classified as Plesiosaurus macrocephalus, it was later reclassified as Rhomaleosaurus megacephalus. However, according to Adam Smith and Gareth Dyke (2008), the fossil is actually of another, unnamed genus.

In September 2011, the museum expanded its Dinosaur Gallery, reorganizing fossils, adding a new room, and modifying the gallery itself. The new Dinosaur Gallery, which predominantly features extinct marine reptiles, was opened by David Attenborough. The "star attractions" of the new gallery include the aforementioned Rutland cetiosaur, Charnia and plesiosaur fossils, as well as a Leedsichthys fossil and a piece of the Barwell Meteorite.

The museum holds a specimen of international importance, the Charnia fossil. It is the first fossil that was ever described that came from undoubted Precambrian rocks, which until this point had been thought to be too early for large forms of life. The object in the museum – "Leicester's fossil celebrity" – is a holotype, that is, the actual physical example from which the species was first identified and formally described. Charnia masoni was named after Roger Mason, who discovered it at Charnwood Forest in 1957, when he was a schoolboy, and who went on to a career as an academic geologist. He acknowledges, and the museum's Charnia display explains, that the fossil had been discovered a year earlier by a schoolgirl, Tina Negus, "but no one took her seriously."

=== Ancient Egypt ===
The museum has a permanent Egyptology exhibit. The museum holds four Egyptian mummies, named Pa-nesit-tawy, Pe-iuy, Bes-en-Mut and Ta-Bes. Pe-iuy was the first to enter the museum's collection being purchased in 1859 for £45. Bes-en-Mut and Ta-Bes were taken out of Egypt by John Mason Cook the son of Thomas Cook in around 1880. He later gifted them to the museum.

Pa-nesit-tawy was the last being donated to the museum by the Huntingdon Literary and Scientific society in 1928. Living in 600BC and buried in Thebes he was gifted in 1869 to Edward VII then Prince of Wales. Edward VII regifted Pa-nesit-tawy to Oliver George Paulet Montagu who in turn gifted him to the Huntingdon Literary and Scientific society.

The Egyptology section of the museum has undergone an expansion, covering life in Egypt in greater detail, as well as a section focused on death in Egypt, which is where the four mummies are held. The artefacts came mainly from Europeans visiting Egypt during the revival of interest in Egyptology which occurred during the 19th century. The capacity of the galleries have been greatly expanded as of 2018. The museum holds a collection of over 400 objects from the Ancient Egyptian era, but has only, until recently, been able to display around a third of these. The new gallery has allowed for these to be shown to the public. Since 2020 the galley has been home to a statue of Husband and wife, Sethmose and Isisnofret purchased from the then bankrupt Thomas Cook Group.

== Other ==
The museum has a stuffed polar bear, Peppy, the mascot of Fox's Glacier Mints. This is held in a collection of taxidermy animals, which have been collected from areas around the world. The exhibit includes a number of temperate specimens, as well as polar and savannah specimens.

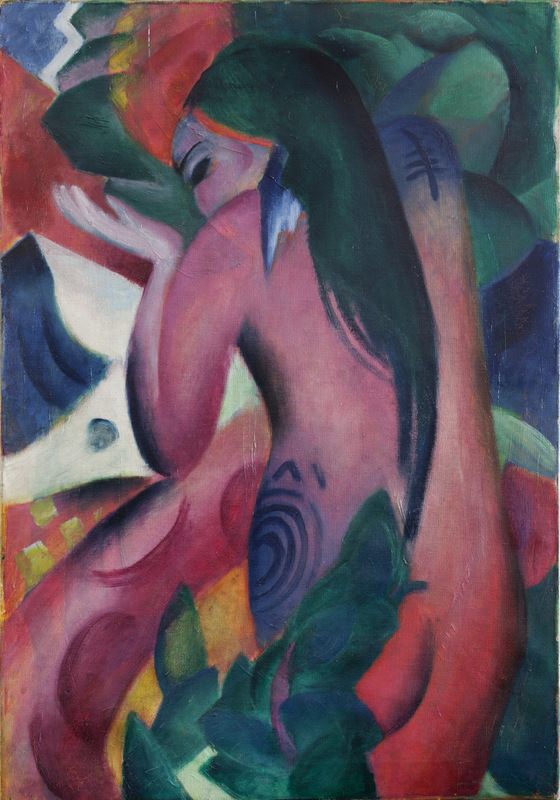
Red Woman by Franz Marc, 1912

The museum holds the UK's largest collection of German Expressionist art. These paintings, including works by George Grosz, Wassily Kandinsky and Paul Klee, were smuggled out of Nazi Germany before World War II. The Nazis condemned the work of these painters – see the 1937 Degenerate Art Exhibition. Hans Hess, son of the German-Jewish industrialist and art collector, Alfred Hess, was assistant curator at the museum.

In 2007, more than 100 pieces of Picasso ceramic art went on display at the museum, having been donated by Richard Attenborough.

== Exhibitions ==
On the first floor of the museum is an exhibition area that changes periodically. Exhibits have included a display focusing on the search for the remains of Richard III, a Wallace and Gromit display, and Spirits of War to Hands of Peace, an exhibit of paintings and sculpture on the horrors of war and the power of peace.

As part of the National Portrait Gallery's 'Coming Home' project, a portrait of Richard III was on temporary display during the summer of 2019, following the reinterment of the king in Leicester Cathedral in 2015.

== Name change ==
The museum was relaunched in August 2020, after a lengthy closure in response to the COVID-19 pandemic. The museum reopened under a new name: Leicester Museum & Art Gallery, chosen "to demonstrate that it is Leicester's leading museum, and to help people from outside the city if they are searching online for Leicester museums."
