= Charnwood Forest =

Upland area in Leicestershire, England

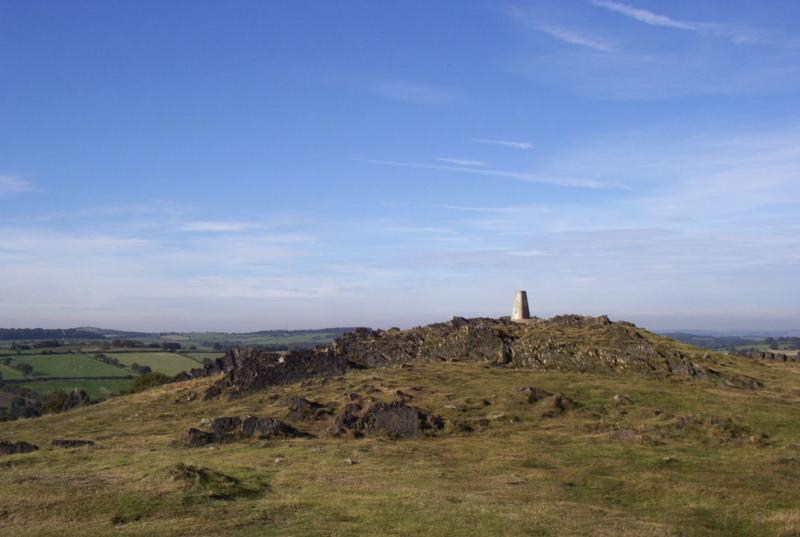
The summit of Beacon Hill

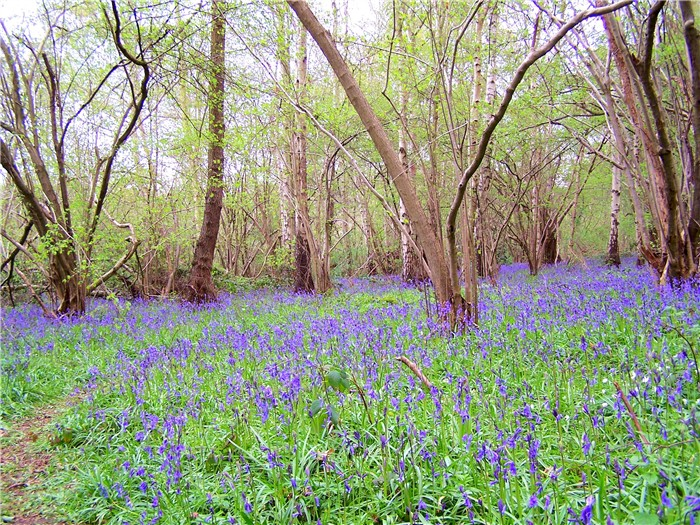
Bluebells in Swithland Wood

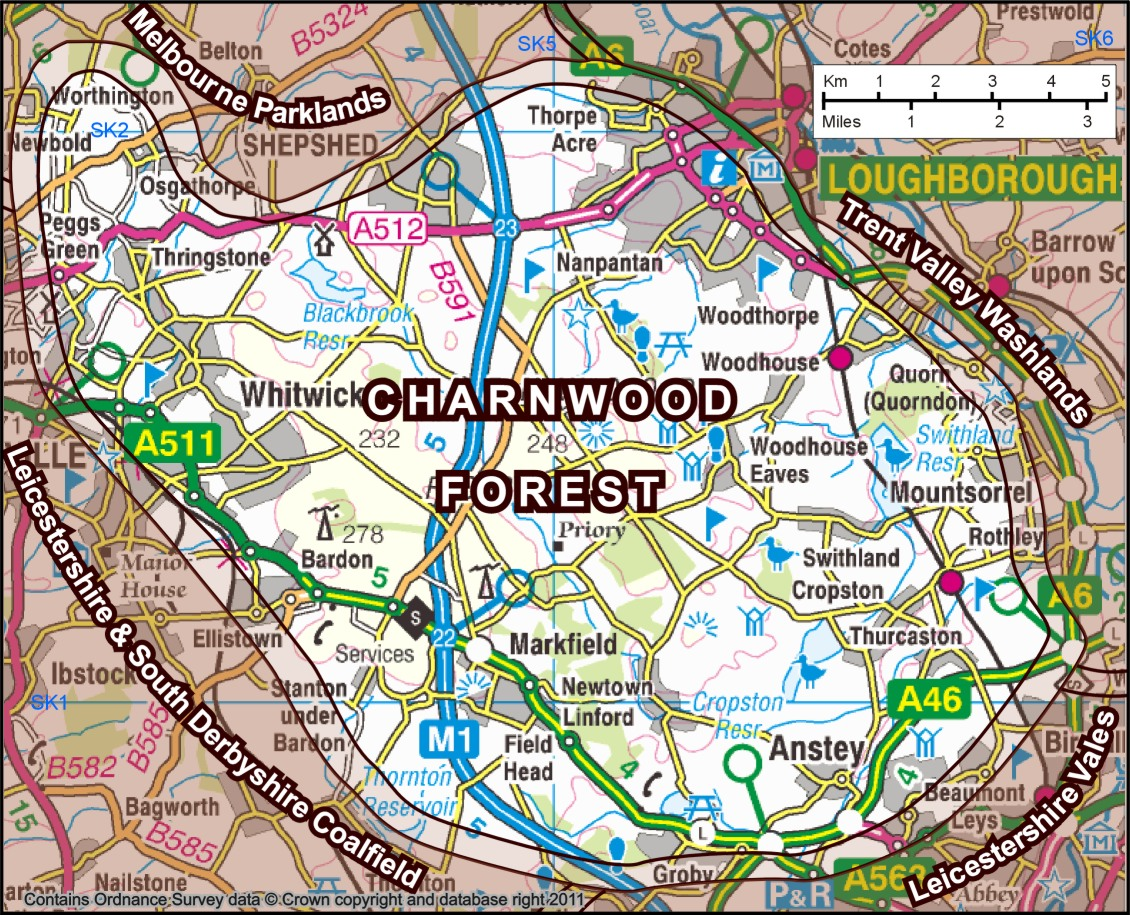
Charnwood Forest, as defined by Natural England

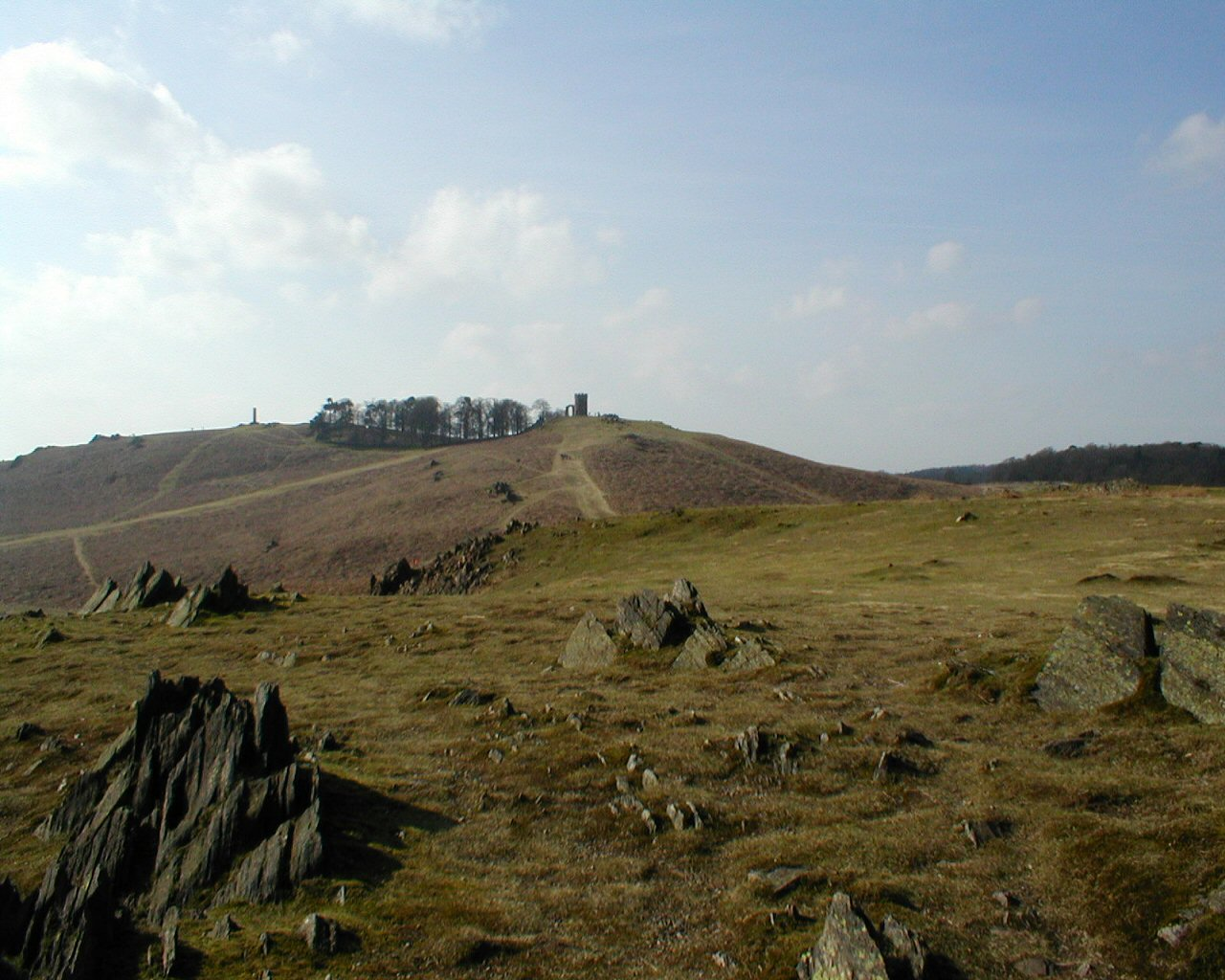
Old John, Bradgate Park

Charnwood Forest is a hilly tract in northwestern Leicestershire, England, bounded by Leicester, Loughborough and Coalville. The area is undulating, rocky and picturesque, with moorland areas. It also has some extensive tracts of woodland, and significant Precambrian geology. Its elevation is generally 600 feet (180 m) and upwards, the area exceeding this height being about 6,100 acres (25 km^{2}). The highest point, Bardon Hill, is 912 feet (278 m).

On its western flank lies an abandoned coalfield, with Coalville and other former mining villages, now being regenerated and replanted as part of the National Forest. The M1 motorway, between junctions 22 and 23, cuts through Charnwood Forest.

The hard stone of Charnwood Forest has been quarried for centuries, and was a source of whetstones and quern-stones. The granite quarries at Bardon Hill, Buddon Hill and Whitwick supply crushed aggregate to a wide area of southern Britain.

The forest is an important recreational area with woodland walks, noted for their displays of bluebells in the early spring, rock climbing and hillwalking. Popular places with public access include Bardon Hill, Beacon Hill, Bradgate Park, Swithland Wood, the Outwoods and Stoneywell cottage (National Trust).

== Extent ==
The area of hills and open land known as Charnwood Forest has no jurisdictional boundary (the Borough of Charnwood covers roughly two thirds of Charnwood Forest, and the eastern half of the borough is not part of the forest). Furthermore, despite its name, Charnwood was never a royal forest, and was never subject to forest law. So although it is an ancient and well-established locality, it has only recently been officially defined, by the Natural England National Character Area (NCA) process, which takes a somewhat wider definition than many previous attempts to define the area.

== Geology ==
Many of the craggy rocks of Charnwood Forest are of volcanic origin and are very old, dating back through 600 million years to Precambrian times. It was the site of the first-ever recorded discovery of Charnia masoni, the earliest-known large, complex fossilised species on record, recovered from a quarry near the Charnwood village of Woodhouse Eaves. It was discovered separately in 1956 and 1957 by local schoolchildren Tina Negus and Roger Mason, although it was Mason who received the credit (thus masoni). Since this find in Charnwood Forest, Precambrian fossils have been discovered across the world.

Along the western edge of Charnwood Forest the rocks are mainly Precambrian igneous diorites. These formed from molten lava deep within the sedimentary rocks, cooling slowly to produce hard, blocky rock with large crystals. This is extensively quarried for roadstone around Groby, Markfield and Whitwick, and is known as granite (formerly also called Markfieldite).

The central area of the forest has older rocks still. These are sedimentary and are very variable in character, They were formed by material from volcanoes, settling in deep water, and it is in these beds that the fossils are found. Uplifting, tilting and erosion have produced the distinctive jagged exposures found across the highest parts of Charnwood. On the eastern side, a much more recent series of rocks are found. Again igneous diorites, that formed deep underground, but these are Ordovician, from a mere 450 million years ago. These are extensively quarried in the areas near Mountsorrel.

== History ==
The earliest form of the name Charnwood is probably derived from cerne woda, from the Celtic carn, meaning cairn, and the Old English wudu, meaning wood. Some sources give cwern as the derivation, meaning a tool used to grind grain and other materials by hand. The area was a source of stone for these tools, called quern-stones.

Archeological evidence has shown that the area was inhabited as far back as the Neolithic period, approximately 4,000–2,000 BC. A group of Neolithic stone axes known as 'Group XX', has 134 known examples, having been found widely acrooss the UK. This group has been identified as having a 'Bradgate Formation' rock characteristic, and thus was originally made in the Charnwood area. A 2026 petrology study has identified a site at Windmill Hill as a possible source outcrop. Nearby Beacon Hill has an Iron Age hill fort, dating from between 600 BC and 43 AD. This forms one of the surviving visible features in the landscape known to the Coritani, the tribe who occupied most of the East Midlands area at the time of the Roman Conquest.

According to Domesday Book, there was only one settlement in Charnwood Forest in 1086, at Charley whose name would appear to come from the same root, with the suffix -ley denoting open land, rather than forest.

In the 200 years after the Norman conquest, newly created settlements took major areas of land out of the forest for use in agriculture. Quorn was established between 1086 and 1153, and all the land up to Woodhouse had been deforested by 1228.

There were comparatively few major changes in land use in the post Medieval period, until the demand for timber and charcoal for the early Industrial Revolution contributed to a further loss of woodland. By the end of the 18th century, most of the woodland had disappeared leaving large areas of moorland and pasture.

== In literature ==
The area was the inspiration for "Charnwood Poems", a collection of poems by the author, playwright and poet Albert Francis Cross (1863–1940). It is also the setting for the speculative fiction novel Some Kind of Fairy Tale by Graham Joyce (2012), in which it is depicted as a possible portal to the realm of fairies.

== Conservation and designation ==
In 1957, Charnwood Forest was considered for designation as an Area of Outstanding Natural Beauty (AONB), but the designation was not made due to the construction of the M1 motorway through the area.

Charnwood Forest Geopark is a partnership organisation seeking to establish the area as a UNESCO Global Geopark. Headed up by The National Forest as one of the 17 statutory, NGO and charitable partners, they are looking to protect, enhance and develop the landscape and heritage characteristics of Charnwood Forest. From origins in 2007, establishment in 2013, and funded activities that commenced in 2021, it reached a position to apply for full acreditation in Autumn 2025, with an award potentially being decided by 2027. The main areas of activity are geological conservation, habitat restoration, improved interpretation and learning material, and cultural and heritage activities and events.

== Wildlife and geological sites ==
Map showing sites in Charnwood Forest notable for wildlife and geology

Charnwood Forest covers approx 67 sq mi (170 km^{2}) of Leicestershire, split over three local government districts: Charnwood Borough, North West Leicestershire District and Hinckley and Bosworth District. It includes a national nature reserve (NNR), 19 SSSIs (Some subdivided in the list of sites below), 4 Geological Conservation Review (GCR) sites of international geological importance plus a further 6 GCR sites, 13 regionally important geological sites (RIGS), five local nature reserves (LNRs), seven Leicestershire and Rutland Wildlife Trust (LRWT) nature reserves, and one Woodland Trust woodland. Seventeen sites have open access to the public. Footpaths and bridleways give views and limited access to the other sites listed, and to the rest of the Charnwood Forest landscape. Over half of Charnwood Forest is included within the English National Forest. It is also crossed by two waymarked long distance walking routes—the Leicestershire Round and the Ivanhoe Way. The 45 sites listed here include sites with statutory wildlife or geological designations, plus other sites included in published lists of notable sites. On both the map and table, green denotes a site open to the public, amber denotes a site with limited access or restricted by permit or membership. Red denotes a site with no public access except by special arrangement with the owners.

Plants found within the woods include Digitalis purpurea, Dactylorhiza fuchsii, Sorbus torminalis and Vaccinium myrtilus.

Sites in Charnwood Forest notable for Wildlife and Geology
Map No.	Site Name	Status	Access	Location and map link	Area (ha)	Habitat	Ownership and details
1	Breedon Cloud Wood and Quarry	SSSI(B&G) & RIGS	Restricted	52.7886°N 1.3860°W; SK415214	63	Ancient woodland and limestone quarry	Breedon Cloud Wood is owned by LRWT. Permit needed. Cloud Hill Quarry is owned by Ennstone Breedon Ltd.
2	Shepshed Cutting	SSSI(G)	Partial	52.7630°N 1.3168°W; SK462186	6.1	Old Quarry with Galena of a type unknown elsewhere in the world.	The quarry is crossed by a disused railway cutting of the Charnwood Forest Railway which is now a path and cycleway and of the short-lived Charnwood Forest Canal.
3	Morley Quarry, Shepshed	LNR, GCR & RIGS	Open	52.7566°N 1.2961°W; SK476179	3	Disused quarry	Charnwood Borough Council. Car Park off Iveshead Road. Cliff faces show the oldest of Charnwood's Precambrian rocks and the Triassic unconformity.
4	Newhurst Quarry, Shepshed	SSSI(G), GCR & RIGS	None	52.7565°N 1.2828°W; SK485179	9	Quarry currently being used for waste disposal	Landfill site managed by Biffa. GCR listing for Mineralogy significance.
5	Holywell Wood	Woodland	Private	52.7599°N 1.2501°W; SK507183		Woodland	Private. Public footpath runs along its northern edge from Snells Nook Lane.
6	Longcliffe Quarry, Shepshed	RIGS	None	52.7844°N 1.2726°W; SK492170		Quarry site	Midland Quarry Products: working quarry.
7	Ives Head	GCR(I) & RIGS	Partial	52.7485°N 1.2933°W; SK478170		Old quarry and craggy hilltop	Privately owned disused quarry. A public bridleway passes 500 m south of the summit (201 m).
8	Blackbrook Reservoir	SSSI(B&G) & GCR	Partial	52.7532°N 1.3243°W; SK457175	38.6	Open water, wooded banks, wetlands	Severn Trent Water. Access to the viaduct and wooded slopes via One Barrow Lane.
9	Grace Dieu And High Sharpley	SSSI (B&G)	Partial	52.7489°N 1.3540°W; SK437170	89	Heathland and Carbonifierous limestone outcrops	Private owners. Adjoins National Forest access land and Grace Dieu Priory site.
10	Cademan Wood	Woodland	Partial	52.7489°N 1.3526°W; SK438170		Mixed woodland with rocky outcrops	De Lisle family. Public footpaths and informal open access. Spectacular outcrops that formed very close to a Precambrian volcano.
11	Snibston Country Park and Grange Nature Reserve	LNR	Open	52.7238°N 1.3855°W; SK416142	40	Woodland, meadow, marsh and ponds	Leicestershire County Council.
12	Nature Alive! Coalville	LNR	Open	52.7319°N 1.3780°W; SK421151	6	Regenerated scrub and wetland on former industrial land	North West Leicestershire District Council. Valuable site for dragonflies.
13	Whitwick Quarry	RIGS	None	52.7389°N 1.3379°W; SK448159		Quarry site	Midland Quarry Products
14	Mount St Bernard Abbey	Abbey	Partial	52.7415°N 1.3245°W; SK457162		Cistercian Abbey	Visitors to the Abbey and grounds are made welcome. The crags around The Knoll show steeply dipping Charnian tuffs.
15	Charnwood Lodge	NNR, SSSI(B&G) & GCR	Restricted	52.7351°N 1.3113°W; SK466155	193.5	Acid and heath grasslands with some mixed woodland	LRWT, permit needed for parts. Timberwood Hill and Warren Hills are accessible under the right to roam.
16	Jubilee Wood, Woodhouse Lane	Public woodland	Open	52.7437°N 1.2460°W; SK510165	10	Mixed woodland and rocky outcrops	Leicestershire County Council.
17	Loughborough Outwoods, Woodhouse Lane	SSSI(B&G) GCR (I)	Open	52.7392°N 1.2387°W; SK515160	44.6	Mixed woodland and rocky outcrops	Charnwood Borough Council. Free car park.
18	Woodbrook and Deans Wood	Stream and woodland	Partial	52.7375°N 1.2535°W; SK505158		Charnwood stream and woodland	Permissive path from Jubilee wood to Deans Lane.
19	Charley Woods	Nature reserve	Open	52.7288°N 1.2966°W; SK476148	28.8	Oak woodland	LRWT, open to the public.
20	Bardon Hill Quarry	SSSI(G) GCR and RIGS	None	52.7154°N 1.3220°W; SK459133	79	Quarry. Precambrian Igneous Rocks	Aggregate Industries.
21	Bardon Hill	SSSI(B)	Partial	52.7145°N 1.3190°W; SK461132	13	High moorland, highest point in Leicestershire (278m)	Private land. Access to the summit, via public footpaths with expansive views.
22	Beacon Hill, Woodhouse Eaves	SSSI(B&G) GCR & Ancient Monument	Open	52.7266°N 1.2418°W; SK513146	135	Heathland, rocks, woodland hillfort	Leicestershire County Council.
23	Broombriggs Farm and Windmill Hill	Farm Trail	Open	52.7247°N 1.2271°W; SK523144	55	Farmland and heath	Leicestershire County Council. Pay car park.
24	Buddon Brook	Stream	Partial	52.7352°N 1.1780°W; SK556156		Stream habitat	Private farmland. A public footpath runs beside the stream.
25	Buddon Wood	SSSI(B&G) and RIGS	None	52.7316°N 1.1751°W; SK558152	89	Ancient Oak woodland, now mostly quarried away,	Private – including Lafarge Aggregates.
26	Main Quarry, Mountsorrel	SSSI(G) & GCR	None	52.7278°N 1.1470°W; SK577148	14	Quarry site	Lafarge Aggregates. Largest man-made hole in Europe. School visits are possible.
27	Swithland Reservoir and Brazil Island	SSSI (B&G) and RIGS	Partial	52.72260°N 1.1723°W; SK560142	98	Open water, wooded banks	Severn Trent Water. Limited road and footpath access. Excellent views from Great Central Railway, which crosses the reservoir via Brazil Island.
28	The Brand, Swithland	SSSI(B&G) & GCR	None	52.7147°N 1.2080°W; SK536133	18	Oak woodland, grassy heath and old slate quarries	Private (Martin family). Occasional open days.
29	Roecliffe Manor Lawns	SSSI(B)	None	52.7076°N 1.2155°W; SK531125	1.2	Species rich grassland with rare fungi	Private (Cottingham family).
30	Swithland Wood	NNR, SSSI(B&G)	Open	52.7057°N 1.2022°W; SK540123	61	Ancient Woodland and disused slate quarries	Bradgate Park Trust. Pay car parks.
31	Benscliffe Wood	SSSI(B)	None	52.7095°N 1.2406°W; SK514127	10	Mixed woodland	Private wood. Particularly rich in lichen species.
32	Ulverscroft Nature Reserve, Whitcroft's Lane	Nature reserve	Restricted	52.7071°N 1.2762°W; SK490124	56	Mixed woodland, marshy grassland and meadow	NT, managed by LRWT (NT members need LRWT permit).
33	Rocky Plantation, Nr Markfield	Nature reserve	Restricted	52.7016°N 1.2719°W; SK493118	3.4	Mixed woodland and rocky outcrops	NT, managed by LRWT. Open to Wildlife Trust and National Trust members only.
34	Lea Meadows, Ulverscroft Lane	SSSI	Open	52.6988°N 1.2527°W; SK506115	12	Meadow	LRWT, open to the public.
35	Billa Barra Hill	LNR & RIGS	Open	52.6974°N 1.3089°W; SK468113	20	Old quarry, grassland, mature and recent woodland.	Hinckley and Bosworth Borough Council. Open to the public. Car Park on Billa Barra Lane.
36	New Cliffe Hill Quarry	RIGS	None	52.6929°N 1.3164°W; SK463108	243	Quarry. Precambrian Rocks	Midland Quarry Products: working quarry (A tunnel links this to Cliffe Hill Quarry).
37	Cliffe Hill Quarry	SSSI(G) GCR (I) and RIGS	None	52.6901°N 1.2987°W; SK475105	37	Quarry. Precambrian Rocks	Midland Quarry Products: working quarry.
38	Altar Stones, Markfield	Nature reserve	Open	52.6918°N 1.2839°W; SK485107	3.7	Rough heath grassland with rock outcrops	LRWT, open to the public.
39	Hill Hole Quarry, Markfield	Nature reserve and RIGS	Open	52.6873°N 1.2825°W; SK486102	5.4	Flooded quarry, rock faces and grassland	Hinckley and Bosworth Borough Council. Open to the public. The old quarry faces show the youngest of the area's Precambrian rocks.
40	Cropston Reservoir	SSSI(B&G)	None	52.6939°N 1.1936°W; SK546110	55	Open water, wetlands	Severn Trent Water. No access but with good views from Bradgate Park.
41	Bradgate Park	NNR, SSSI(B&G) GCR(I)	Open	52.6917°N 1.2214°W; SK530110	340	Bracken heath, rocks, river, woodland, ancient oaks	Bradgate Park Trust. Pay car parks.
42	Sheet Hedges Wood, Newtown Linford	SSSI(B)	Open	52.6735°N 1.2265°W; SK524087	30	Mixed woodland	Leicestershire County Council. Free car park near Groby Pool.
43	Groby Pool	SSSI(B)	Partial	52.6690°N 1.2280°W; SK523082	28	Open water, wetlands	Amalgamated Roadstone Corp. One side has good roadside paths and access with a large nearby free car park.
44	Groby Quarry	RIGS	None	52.6699°N 1.2251°W; SK525083		Working Quarry	Amalgamated Roadstone Corporation (ARC)
45	Martinshaw Wood	Public woodland	Open	52.6601°N 1.2474°W; SK510072	102	Mixed woodland	Woodland Trust.

Abbreviations used in the table: National nature reserve (NNR). Site of Special Scientific Interest (SSSI) (B=Biological, G=Geological). Geological Conservation Review (GCR)(I=of International importance). Regionally Important Geological Site (RIGS). Leicestershire and Rutland Wildlife Trust (LRWT). National Trust (NT). Local nature reserve (LNR).

== See also ==
- Henry Walter Bates
- Thomas George Bonney
- Borough of Charnwood
- Quorn Hunt
- Charnia
