= Tina Negus =

English zoologist (born 1941)

- Born: Christina Batty; 1941 (age 84–85); Grantham, England
- Education: University of Reading
- Known for: Discovery of Charnia; Molluscs of River Thames
- Scientific career
- Fields: Zoology; Ecology
- Workplaces: Durham University

Tina Negus (born 1941) is a British zoologist, painter and poet who is credited as the original discoverer of Charnia, the first known Precambrian fossil. A fossil enthusiast since childhood, she found the first specimen of frond-like fossil at Charnwood Forest in Leicestershire during a summer vacation in 1956.

Negus studied zoology, botany and geography at the University of Reading. She took up zoology for her postgraduate degree and her dissertation on mussel diversity and abundance, published in the Journal of Animal Ecology in 1966, became a fundamental source of information on the degree of pollution in the River Thames. In recognition of her pioneering work, the University of Reading commissioned the Tina Negus Prize to graduate students of biology since 2019.

== Early life and education ==
Negus was born Christina L. Batty in Grantham, Lincolnshire, England. Growing up in "Liassic (limestone sediments of Early Jurassic, about 200 to 180 million years old) sandstones and clays", as she described her upbringing, her childhood activities were mostly collecting fossils, and was familiar with ammonites and belemnites. During her school vacations, she explored interesting geological sites such as Peak District and Kent. During her secondary schooling, she read a small handbook Geology of the Ancient Rocks of Charnwood Forest, Leicestershire (1947) by William Whitehead Watts, who had documented the Precambrian (roughly older than 530 million years ago) nature of the Charnwood rocks. This information inspired her for a field visit to Charnwood.

Enthused by her passion for fossils, she applied for an A level course in geology but her headmistress would not allow it. She therefore took A levels in zoology, botany, geography and art. She continued with an undergraduate course in zoology, botany and geography at the University of Reading in 1961 and completed the degree with honours in zoology. She then continued with a postgraduate research-based MSc in ecology at the same university. After her master's degree, she briefly joined Durham University. After her marriage, she gave up career in academics and developed her talents in painting, sculpting, photography and poetry.

== Discovery of the Precambrian fossil ==
=== First discovery ===
For the 1956 summer vacation, Negus persuaded her family to explore Charnwood Forest with of pretext of collecting blueberries. According to her memory, it would have been around June and July as the blueberries were not yet ripe. That was not her priority, but instead was searching for fossils among the deepest rocks exposed. Furnished with maps from Watts's book, she already knew the best locations to look for. At an abandoned quarry of turbidites (a type of sedimentary rocks deposited from turbidity currents of oceans), she found large slabs of rocks inclined to form a wall. The rock faces were too smooth and vertical that she could only scrape along the lower bases. Hidden behind some roots and thickets, she saw a clear impression on one rock that looked like a fern. She also knew that it was not a proper fern as the frond had no stem or branching veins. It was obvious to her that it was a fossil in a Precambrian rock. Her parents did not have connections with scientists so they only encouraged her to tell her teachers.

For Negus, the closest to a scientist in palaeontology was her geography teacher. As she described the discovery, her teacher was not interested and simply said that there were no fossils in Precambrian rocks, that what she found was either not a fossil or the rocks were much younger. She could not convince anyone, but her confidence remained unfeigned. During winter vacation of that year in December, she again asked her parents to make another trip to Charnwood Forest. Then equipped with her father's coal hammer, she tried to extract the fossils from the rock slab, but only to find that the hand-tool could not make a crack on the hard rock. Instead, Negus took a pencil and made a stencil trace of the fossil on two sheets of paper. Trying to identify the fossil herself, she searched through all possible information from books and local museum, but found no matching image of her ancient frond. She kept her pencil rubbing in a folder for any future clue.

=== Rediscovery and identification ===
In May 1957, Roger Mason, Richard Blatchford and Richard Allen from Wyggeston Grammar School for Boys in Leicester went rock-climbing in the Charnwood Forest. It was Blachford who first spotted the fossil imprint and thought it was a feather. A 15-year-old Mason climbed down to the spot and found that it was more fern-like. He already knew that the rocks were of Precambrian origin and nobody expected fossils of that kind. He took a rubbing of it and showed it to his father at home. Mason's father was a teacher at the University of Leicester and quickly approached his young colleague and geologist, Trevor D. Ford. Sceptical of a fossil in Precambrian rocks, Ford and the Masons went to Charnwood Forest and confirmed the fossil.

In September 1957, Ford had professional miners excavate the rock and extract the fossil for display at the Leicester Museum & Art Gallery (New Walk Museum and Art Gallery, prior to 2022). Ford made further exploration of Charnwood Forest for any other specimens and found five more fern-like specimens and twelve ring-like fossils. Upon analysis, he identified the two types of fossils as algae, and for the fern-like type he created the scientific name Charnia masoni, to credit the place and discoverer. He reported the description in the September 1958 issue of the Proceedings of the Yorkshire Geological Society, drawing a conclusion:

Several specimens of two new fossils recently found in the Woodhouse Beds of the Charnwood Forest Pre-Cambrian succession are described and named Charnia masoni and Charniodiscus concentricus... The evidence points to their being algae.

Charnia masoni became the most iconic and first ever known Precambrian organism. (Note: Other fossils later identified as belonging to Precambrian were discovered earlier, such as Aspidella from Newfoundland in 1868 and Dickinsonia from the Ediacaran Hills, Australia, in 1947, but their nature as fossils and their geological age were not established until the 1960s.)

=== Negus's pursuit ===
Not knowing that her fossil had been described and reported, Negus returned to Charnwood Forest in 1958, only to discover that the fossil had been extracted and disappeared. As soon as she entered the University of Reading in 1961, she took her fossil tracing to the geologist there for identification only to discover that her fossil had been described three years before. Her contribution to the fossil discovery was lost until 2004, when she saw Mason, who was then a geologist at the University College London, talking about the discovery of Charnia on a television programme. By then, Charnia and other Ediacaran fossils became famous as evidence of Precambrian life, which had remained one of the biggest puzzles in the history of life on Earth and the so called "Darwin's dilemma". In introducing the theory of natural selection in 1859, Darwin argues that the absence of such ancient lives was "the most obvious and gravest objection" to his theory.

=== Recognition of Negus's contribution ===
Negus called up Mason and told him of her own discovery. Mason accepted Negus's priority, later declaring: "Tina Negus saw the frond before I did but no one took her seriously." In 2007, Negus's role was properly recognised at the seminar at Leicester University celebrating the 50th anniversary of Charnia discovery, where she was invited alongside Mason and Ford. The seminar ended with cutting of the "Charnia cake" by the three.

== Ecology of River Thames ==
In her master's degree course in zoology at the University of Reading, Negus researched on the ecology of the River Thames for her dissertation in 1964 and focussed on the diversity and abundance of freshwater mussels. She published her findings in the Journal of Animal Ecology in 1966, which remained unnoticed for over half a century. She reported that the major species of mussels were the duck mussel (Anodonta anatina) and the painter's mussel (Unio pictorum); A. minima and U. tumidus were also common, and the rarest were A. cygnea. Negus's selection of the mussels was notable in that the animals account for 90% of all living organisms recorded by weight on the Thames' riverbed. The importance of her research was realised and revived in 2022 when University of Cambridge scholar Isobel Ollard re-investigated the same mussel ecology at the same site. Since the late 1960's, it has been established that the different biological features of mussels are reliable scientific indicators of the health of the water bodies.

In 2023, Ollard reported her investigation in the same Journal of Animal Ecology. Her findings revealed that the general mussel communities had declined since Negus's report by almost 95%. The duck mussels had decreased to 1.1%, and the painter’s mussel, to 3.2%; while the rare species had completely disappeared. The alarming case was not only on the number, but also on the reduced sizes of the mussels, which is a scientific method of determining the deterioration of the Thames' ecosystem. The size and growth rates had reduced by 10 to 30%. Ollard's supervisor and co-author David Aldridge explained the significance of the study: "While this might seem like a rather parochial little study of a single site in a single river in the UK, it actually provides an important warning signal about the world's freshwaters." Thames in the late 1950s and early 1960s was in its highest level of pollution; in 1957, scientists at the Natural History Museum of London considered the Thames so polluted that they declared it "biologically dead," since it would not be able to sustain any major life form. According to Ollard, the policies on Thames conservation had prevented the total disappearance of the mussels and the stable, albeit critically low number, is an indication that the river ecosystem is improving.

In recognition of her pioneering work, the University of Reading commissioned the Tina Negus Prize to graduate students of biology since 2019.
