= Trevor D. Ford =

English geologist and author (1925–2017)

Trevor D. Ford OBE
- Trevor D. Ford in 1982
- Born: Trevor D. Ford; 19 April 1925; Westcliffe-on-Sea, Southend-on-Sea in Essex, England
- Died: 22 February 2017 (aged 91)
- Citizenship: British
- Education: King Edward VII School, University of Sheffield (Ph.D.)
- Alma mater: University of Sheffield
- Known for: the recognition of the Precambrian fossil Charnia masoni
- Scientific career
- Workplaces: University of Leicester
- Thesis: The Upper Carboniferous rocks of the Ingleton and Stainmore coalfields (1953)
- Doctoral advisor: Leslie R. Moore

Trevor David Ford OBE (19 April 1925 – 22 February 2017) was an English geologist and author, best known for publishing the first report on the Precambrian fossil Charnia masoni in 1958. In addition to paleontology, his wide-ranging research encompassed geomorphology, speleology, studies of minerals and mineralisation, and mining history, and mainly focused on the Peak District. His academic career was at the Department of Geology of the University of Leicester, where he rose to be a senior lecturer (1980–87) and associate dean for combined studies in science. He was the founding editor of the journal now entitled Cave and Karst Science (1973–93), and published many books, both academic texts and books aimed at a broader audience, including cave guides, and guides to geology and minerals.

== Early life and education ==
Trevor Ford was born at Westcliffe-on-Sea, Southend-on-Sea in Essex on 19 April 1925, to Hylda and Ernest Ford, who worked in publishing. The family soon moved north to Ecclesall in Sheffield, where he attended King Edward VII School (1939–41). During the 1930s he acted as a guide at Speedwell Cavern in the Peak District, and assisted in surveying the cavern system.

During the Second World War he first entered the Royal Air Force (1944), but was reassigned to the Royal Navy owing to impaired vision; there he served as a stores assistant in the Far East (1944–46). After he was demobilised he read geology at the University of Sheffield (1947–49), and then studied for his PhD with Leslie R. Moore as his supervisor; his thesis was entitled The Upper Carboniferous rocks of the Ingleton and Stainmore coalfields (1953). In addition to Moore, he was influenced by William G. Fearnsides, Frederick W. Shotton, Peter C. Sylvester-Bradley and William H. Wilcockson. Ford served as editor of the Journal of the University of Sheffield Geological Society (1951–52).

== Career ==
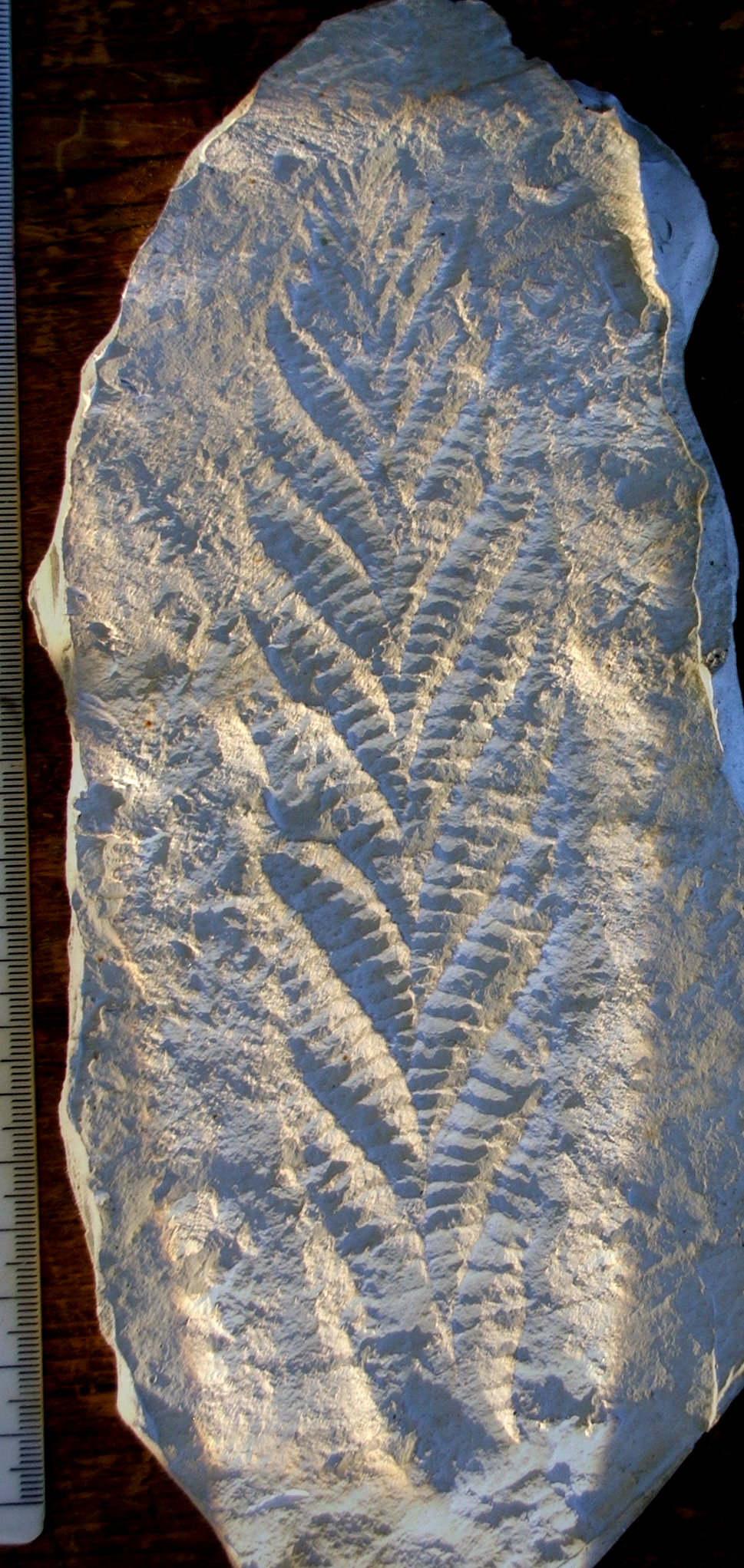
Cast of Charnia masoni fossil

In 1952, Ford took up the position of assistant lecturer at the Department of Geography of the University of Leicester, under John H. McDonald Whitaker. Geology split from geography in 1954, and he remained at the new Department of Geology for his entire career, rising to lecturer and senior lecturer (1980), and also serving as senior tutor and then associate dean for combined studies in science. His notable postgraduate students include Cynthia Burek. He also chaired the earth science board at Nene College of Higher Education, Northampton (1974–87), and taught evening classes at Vaughan College in Leicester. Ford retired in 1987, and was appointed an (honorary) university fellow.

== Research, writing and editing ==
Much of his research was focused on the Peak District, and encompassed geology, geomorphology, speleology and paleontology, studies of local minerals (especially tufas, travertines and the fluorite Blue John, but also Ashford Black Marble), lead–zinc mineralisation, and the history of lead mining in the area. His earliest research paper appeared in 1951.

Ford was instrumental in the recognition of the Precambrian fossil Charnia masoni, discovered in Charnwood Forest by Roger Mason. This find gave the earliest clear evidence for the existence of complex macroscopic organisms dating from this era, although Ford's tentative description of the organism as "an algal frond" is now believed to be incorrect. His 1958 article is the earliest report of fossilised Ediacaran biota from this important site. He subsequently made a detailed study of Precambrian rocks and fossils including research on the Grand Canyon.

He co-authored a history of lead mining in the Peak District with Jim Rieuwerts. He edited Limestones and Caves of the Peak District (1977), and co-edited The Geology of the East Midlands (1968) with Sylvester-Bradley. In addition to his academic texts, he wrote several popular introductions to the geology of the Peak District, an early guide to the geology of the Isle of Man (1993), a definitive study of Blue John, as well as numerous cave guides. He also published on John Whitehurst and White Watson, pioneering geologists of the Peak District, and other topics in the history of geology.

He was the founding editor of Transactions of the British Cave Research Association/Cave Science (1973–93; later Cave and Karst Science), and editor of the Bulletin of the Peak District Mines Historical Society/Mining History (1965–2000). He was also the honorary editor for the Cave Research Group/British Cave Research Association (1964–90), the Peak District Mines Historical Society (1965–90) and the Transactions of the Leicester Literary & Philosophical Society (1986–2000).

== Personal life ==
He married twice: first to Ann Thornhill (died 1956), and in 1958 to Betty Thomas (died 2006). He had two daughters. He kept a holiday home at Castleton in the Peak District. Ford died on 22 February 2017.

== Awards, honours and legacy ==
Ford was awarded the Order of the British Empire (OBE) in 1997 for services to geology and cave science. The Derbyshire Caving Association gave him their "Champion of British Sport" medal (1998). He served as president of the Leicester Literary and Philosophical Society in 1982–83, and was appointed a Life Vice President of the society; he was also president of the East Midlands Geological Society (1982–85). He was awarded an honorary professorship by the University of Derby in 2015.

The type species of the genus Hylaecullulus was named Hylaecullulus fordi in his honour, and a cave in the Speedwell Cavern system was named for him.

== Selected publications ==
Books

- Ford T. D. Rocks and Scenery of the Peak District (Landmark Publishing; 2002) (ISBN 1843060264)
- Ford T. D, Rieuwerts J. H., eds. Lead Mining in the Peak District (Ashbourne and Landmark Publishing for the Peak District Mines Historical Society; 2000) (4th edn) (ISBN 1901522156)
- Ford T. D. Derbyshire Blue John (Landmark Publishing; 2000) (ISBN 1873775199)
- Ford T. The Geology of the Isle of Man (The Geologists' Association; 1993)
- Ford T.D., ed. Limestones and Caves of Wales (Cambridge University Press; 1989) (ISBN 0521169135)
- Ford T. D., Gill D. W. Caves of Derbyshire (Dalesman; 1984) (ISBN 085206781X)
- Ford T. D., ed. Limestones and Caves of the Peak District (Geo-Books; 1977)

Pamphlets

- Ford T. Sediments in Caves; BCRA Cave Studies Series 9 (BCRA; 2001) (ISBN 090026523X)
- Gunn J., Ford T. Caves and Karst of the Peak District; BCRA Cave Studies Series 3 (BCRA; 1992) (ISBN 0-900265-12-4)

Research papers

- Vidal G., Ford T. D. (1985). Microbiotas from the late proterozoic chuar group (northern Arizona) and uinta mountain group (Utah) and their chronostratigraphic implications. Precambrian Research 28: 349–89
- Schopf J. W., Ford T. D., Breed W. J. (1973). Microorganisms from the Late Precambrian of the Grand Canyon, Arizona. Science 179: 1319–21
- Ford T. D. (1958). Pre-Cambrian fossils from Charnwood Forest. Proceedings of the Yorkshire Geological Society, 31: 211–17
