= A. F. Cross =

Albert Francis Cross (1863–1940) wrote under the pen name of A. F. Cross. He was a noted poet, playwright, journalist and author and the founder of several theatres and newspapers in the English Midlands area.

His most popular works include several books of verses and poetry, specifically Songs and Sonnets, Virginia and Charnwood Poems, inspired by a series of walks through Charnwood Forest. Charnwood Poems was published in 1928. He was also the author of several plays, including the musical comedy Dainty Diana.

Born in Moor Lane, Loughborough, on 9 May 1863, Cross began his career as a school master but moved into journalism after contributing to the Leicester Advertiser. In 1895, he became the editor of the Nuneaton Observer.

In 1900, he formed the Nuneaton Theatre and Entertainment Company and became manager of the Prince of Wales Theatre, Nuneaton. He also built the Empire Skating Rink in Nuneaton and managed Rugby Theatre in Rugby.

In 1906, Cross bought the Nuneaton Chronicle from its founder F.D. Robertson. He remained proprietor and editor until his death in 1940.

In 1930, he founded the George Eliot Fellowship.
