= Beacon Hill, Hangingstone and Outwoods =

Biological and geological Site of Special Scientific Interest in Leicestershire

Coordinates: 52.741°N 1.24°W

- Site of Special Scientific Interest
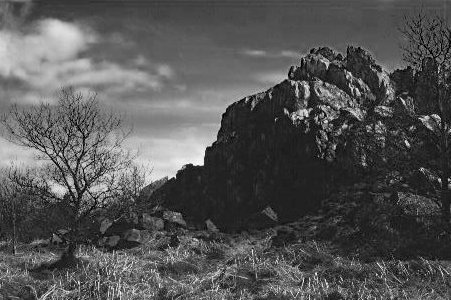
- Location of Beacon Hill, Hangingstone and Outwoods.
- Area of search: Leicestershire
- Grid reference: SK 516 154
- Interest: Biological; Geological
- Area: 147.5 hectares
- Notification date: 1987
- Location map: Magic Map

Beacon Hill, Hangingstone and Outwoods is a 147.5-hectare (364-acre) biological and geological Site of Special Scientific Interest (SSSI) south of Loughborough in Leicestershire. It is also a Geological Conservation Review and a Nature Conservation Review site. The Outwoods and Beacon Hill are part of The National Forest. Two areas in the SSSI, Beacon Hill and Jubilee Woods are country parks managed by Leicestershire County Council, and The Outwoods is managed by Charnwood Borough Council.

Beacon Hill has diverse breeding birds, such as green woodpeckers, tawny owls and tree pipits, and it is one of only three sites in the county with breeding palmate newts. The Outwoods and Hangingstone are of international importance for their fossils of early precambrian life forms.
