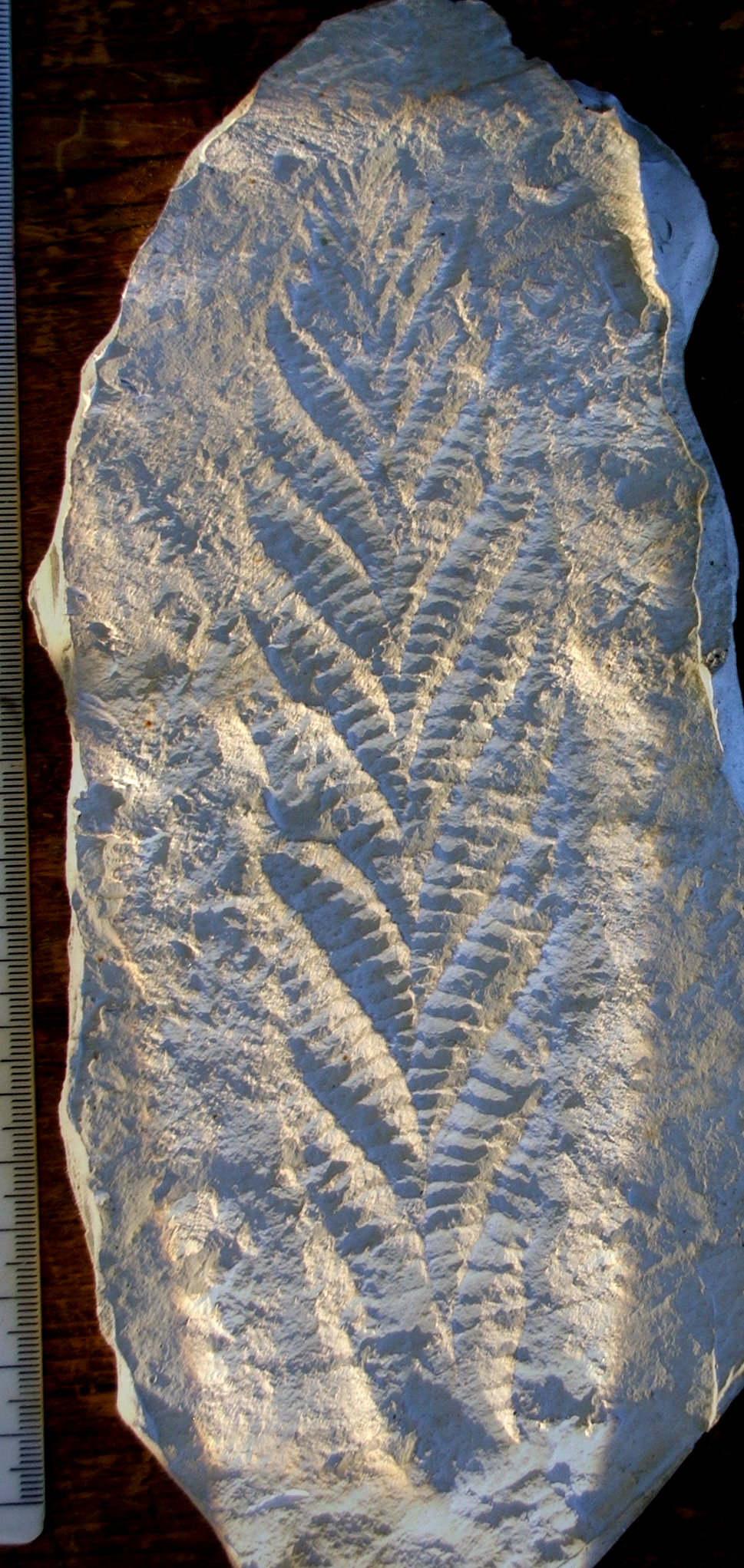
- Cast of the holotype of Charnia masoni

Scientific classification
- Kingdom: Animalia
- Phylum: †Petalonamae
- Clade: †Rangeomorpha
- Family: †Charniidae
- Genus: †Charnia; Ford, 1958

Type species
- Charnia masoni Ford, 1958

Species
- †Charnia brasieri McIlroy et al., 2025; †Charnia ewinoni Pasinetti et al., 2025; †Charnia gracilis Wu et al., 2022; †Charnia grandis (Glaessner & Wade, 1966); †Charnia masoni Ford, 1958

Synonyms
- Genus: Glaessnerina Germs, 1973; Charnia masoni: Rangea sibirica Sokolov, 1972; Glaessnerina sibirica (Sokolov, 1972); Charnia grandis: Rangea grandis Glaessner & Wade, 1966; Glaessnerina grandis (Glaessner & Wade, 1966)

= Charnia =

Charnia Temporal range: Late Ediacaran, 570–550 Ma

Genus of frond-like lifeforms

Charnia is an extinct genus of frond-like lifeforms belonging to the Ediacaran biota with segmented, leaf-like ridges branching alternately to the right and left from a zig-zag medial suture (thus exhibiting glide reflection, or opposite isometry). The genus Charnia was named after Charnwood Forest in Leicestershire, England, where the first fossilised specimen was found, and is thus pronounced /ˈtʃɑːrniə/; the first species of Charnia described, Charnia masoni, was named after Roger Mason, a schoolboy who was believed to have initially discovered it. Charnia is significant because it was the first Precambrian fossil to be recognized as such.

The living organism grew on the sea floor, 570 to 550 million years ago, and is believed to have fed on nutrients in the water. Despite Charnia's fern-like appearance, it is not a photosynthetic plant or alga because the nature of the fossil beds where specimens have been found implies that it originally lived in deep water, well below the photic zone where photosynthesis can occur.

== Diversity ==
Several Charnia species were described but only the type species C. masoni, C. brasieri, C. ewinoni, C. gracilis and C. grandis are considered valid. Some specimens of C. masoni were described as members of genus Rangea or a separate genus Glaessnerina, some of which was then moved back as a separate species, C. grandis.

Two other described Charnia species have been transferred to two separate genera:

- Charnia wardi Narbonne & Gehling, 2003 transferred to the genus Trepassia Narbonne et al., 2009
- Charnia antecedens Laflamme et al., 2007 transferred to the genus Vinlandia Brasier, Antcliffe & Liu, 2012

A number of Ediacaran form taxa are thought to represent Charnia, Charniodiscus and other petalonamids at varying levels of decay; these include the ivesheadiomorphs Ivesheadia, Blackbrookia, Pseudovendia, and Shepshedia.

== Distribution ==
Charnia masoni was first described from the Maplewell Group in Charnwood Forest in England and was subsequently found in Ediacara Hills in Australia, Siberia and the White Sea area in Russia, and Precambrian deposits in Newfoundland, Canada.

It lived about 570-550 million years ago.

== Discovery ==
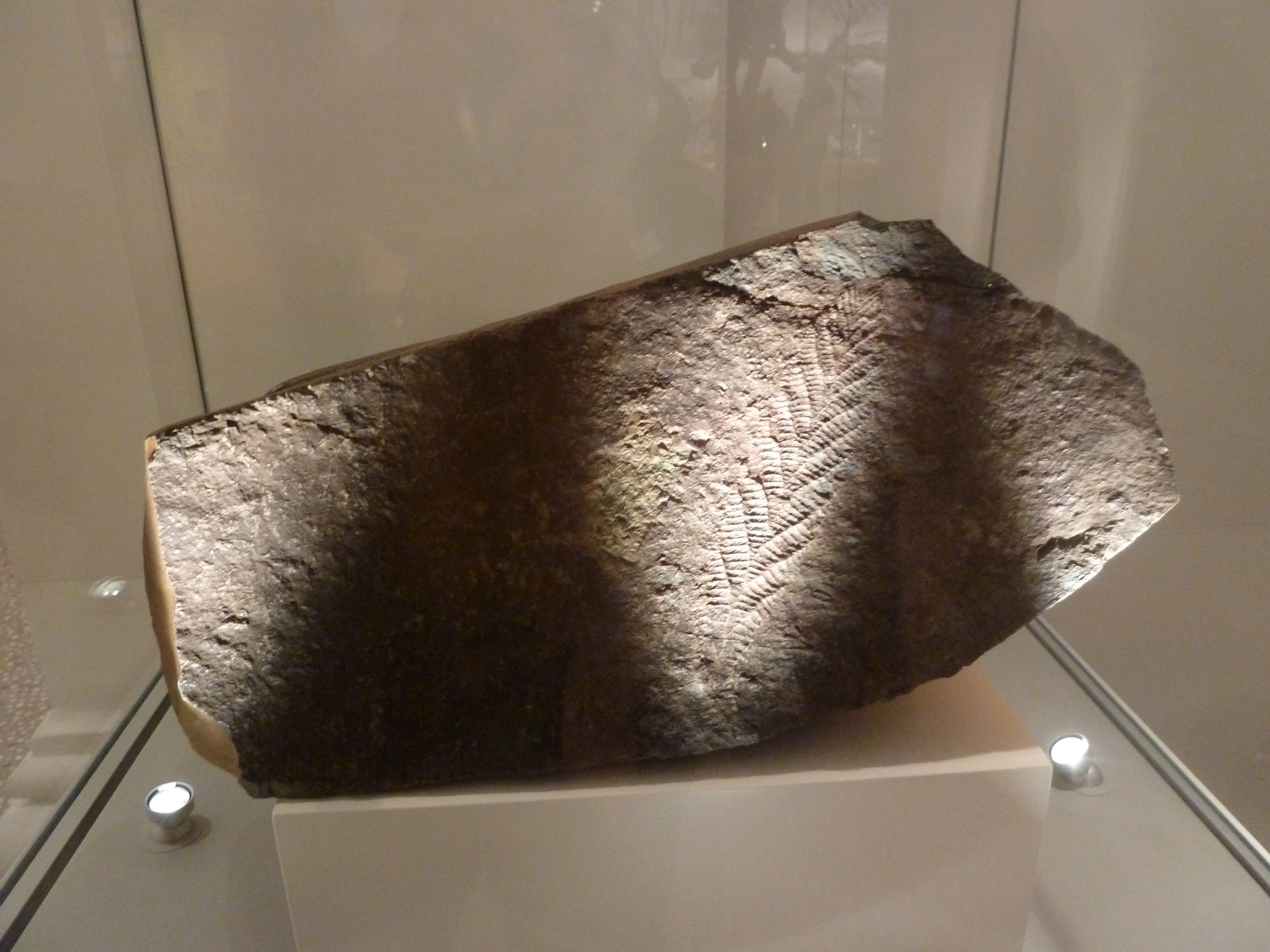
Charnia masoni holotype, Leicester Museum & Art Gallery, Leicester

Charnia masoni was brought to the attention of scientists by Roger Mason, a schoolboy who later became a professor of metamorphic petrology. In 1957 Mason and his friends were rock-climbing in Charnwood Forest, in what is now a protected fossil site in Central England. They noticed this unusual fossil, and Mason took a rubbing of the rock. He showed the rubbing to his father, the minister of Leicester's Great Meeting Unitarian Chapel, who also taught at Leicester University nearby and knew Trevor Ford, a local geologist. Mason took Ford to the site; Ford published the discovery in the Journal of the Yorkshire Geological Society. The holotype (the actual physical example from which the species was first described) now resides, along with a cast of the related taxon Charniodiscus, in Leicester Museum & Art Gallery.

It has also been revealed that Tina Negus, then a 15-year-old schoolgirl, had seen this fossil a year before the boys but her geography schoolteacher discounted the possibility of Precambrian fossils. Mason acknowledges, and the museum's Charnia display explains, that the fossil had been discovered a year earlier by Negus, "but no one took her seriously". She was recognised at the 50th anniversary celebrations of the official discovery.

== Significance ==
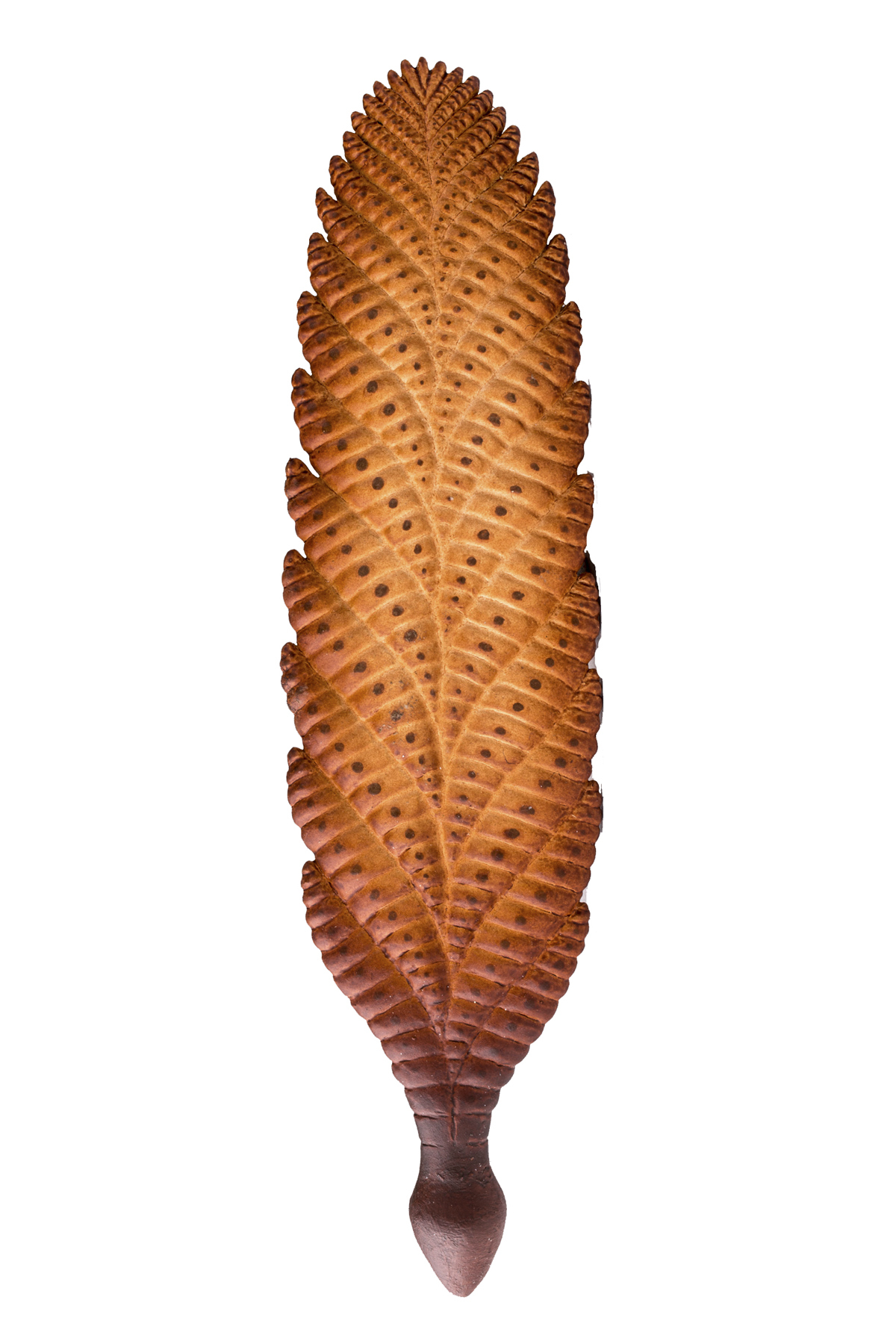
Reconstruction of Charnia masoni at Museo delle Scienze in Trento.

Charnia is known from specimens as small as only 1 cm (0.39 in), and as large as 66 cm (26 in) in length. It is a very significant fossil because it is the first fossil which was ever described to have come from undoubted Precambrian rocks. Prior to 1958, the Precambrian was thought to be completely devoid of fossils and consequently possibly devoid of macroscopic life. Similar fossils had been found during the 1930s (in Namibia) and the 1940s (in Australia) but these forms were assumed to be of Cambrian age and were therefore considered unremarkable at the time. Originally interpreted as an alga, Charnia was reinterpreted as a sea pen (a group related to the modern soft corals) from 1966 onwards. Acceptance of Charnia as a Precambrian lifeform resulted in recognition of other major Precambrian animal groups, although the sea pen interpretation of Charnia has been recently discredited, and the current "state of the art" is something of a "statement of ignorance".

An alternative theory has developed, since the mid-1980s, from the work of Adolf Seilacher who suggested that Charnia belongs to an extinct group of unknown grade which was confined to the Ediacaran Period. This suggests that almost all the forms that have been postulated to be members of many and various modern animal groups are actually more closely related to each other than they are to anything else. This new group was termed the Vendobionta, a clade with unknown relationship to other clades, perhaps united by its construction via unipolar iterations of one cell family.

The holotype is a major attraction at the Leicester Museum & Art Gallery. A day-long seminar in 2007 devoted to Charnia termed it "Leicester's fossil celebrity".

A 2021 detailed analysis of the morphology and growth of Charnia concluded that rangeomorphs like Charnia were early diverging eumetazoans that were not closely related to any living animal group.

== Ecology ==
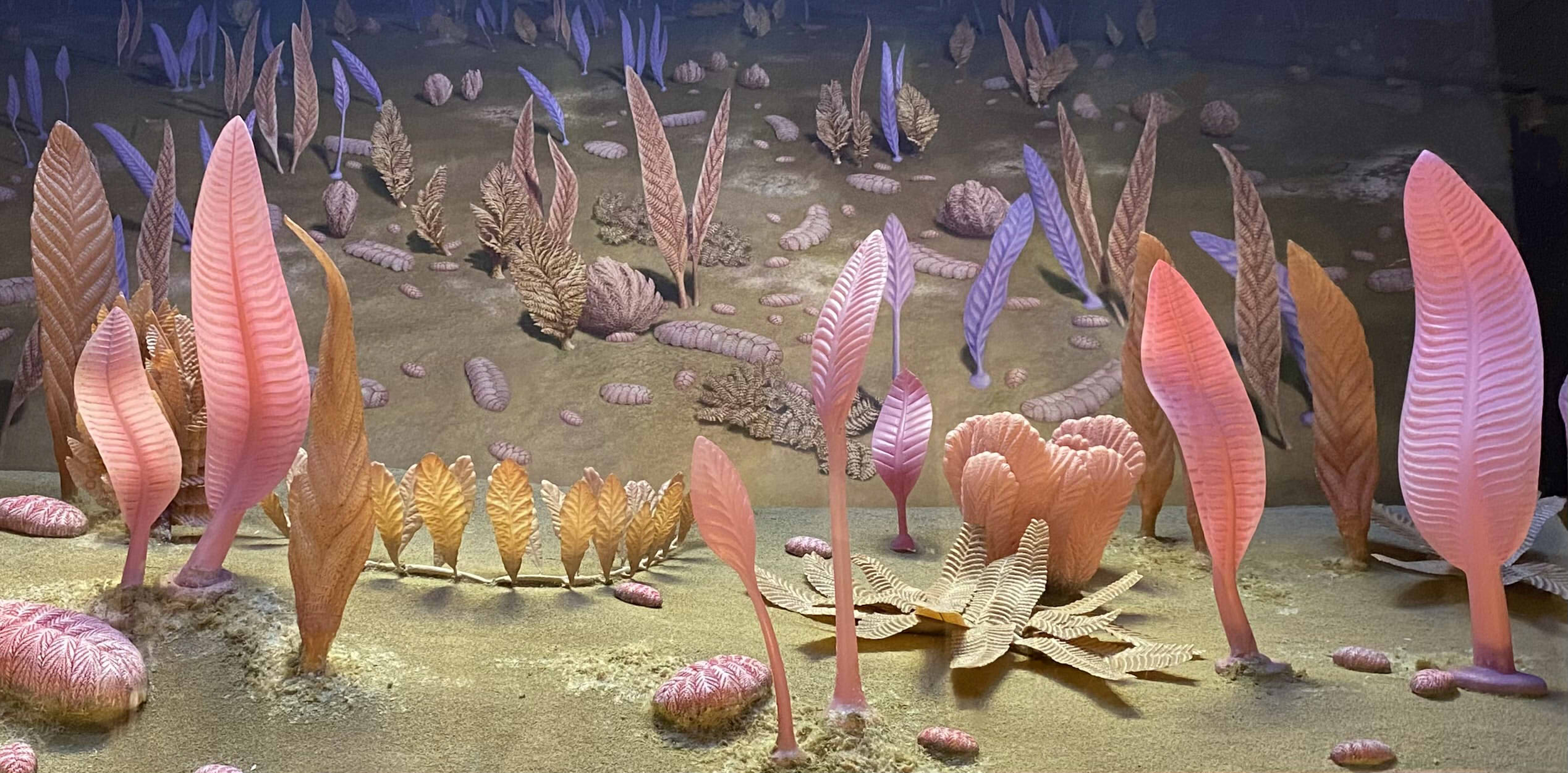
Diorama of Ediacaran ecosystem, with abundant Charnia fronds, at the Smithsonian National Museum of Natural History

Little is known about the ecology of Charnia. It was benthic and sessile, anchored to the sea floor. According to one currently popular hypothesis, it probably lived in deep waters, well below the wave base, thus placing it out of range of photosynthesis. Furthermore, it has no obvious feeding apparatus (mouth, gut, etc.) so its lifestyle remains enigmatic. Some have speculated that it survived either by filter feeding or directly absorbing nutrients, and this is currently the emphasis of considerable research.

The growth and development of the Ediacara biota is also a subject of continued research, and this has discredited the sea pen hypothesis. In contrast to sea pens, which grow by basal insertion, Charnia grew by the apical insertion of new buds.

== See also ==
- List of Ediacaran genera
- Charniodiscus
