= Roger Mason (geologist) =

English geologist (born 1941)

- Born: 4 May 1941 (age 85); Leicester, English Midlands
- Education: Wyggeston Boys’ Grammar School; Christ's College, Cambridge
- Known for: discoverer of Charnia masoni
- Scientific career
- Workplaces: University of London; China University of Geosciences

Roger Mason (born 4 May 1941) is an English geologist who is best known as the discoverer of the original type fossil, Charnia masoni, of a Precambrian (more than 540 million years old) organism that is part of the Ediacaran biota. He is now a professor at the China University of Geosciences in Wuhan, China.

== Charnia discovery ==
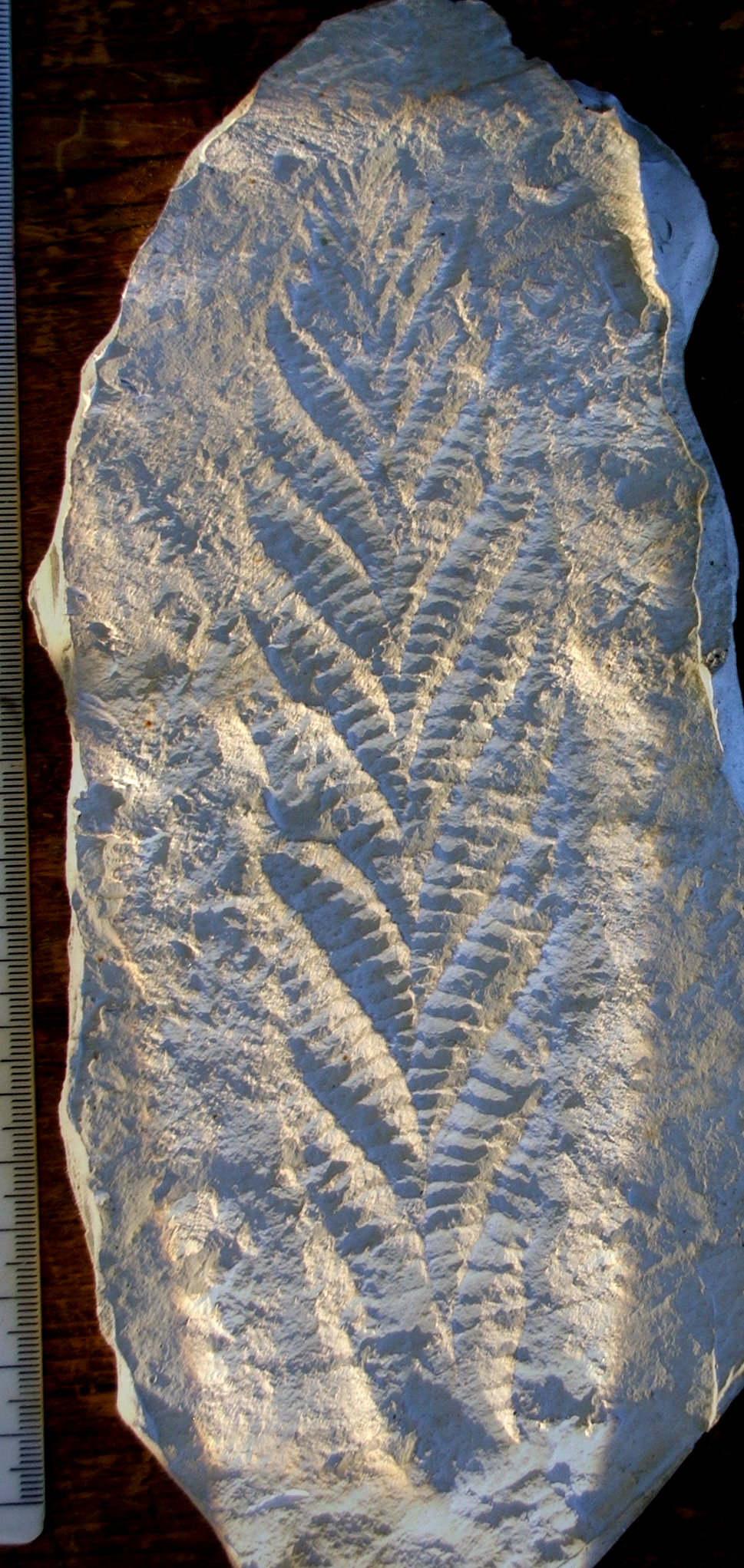
Cast of Charnia masoni fossil

Mason grew up in the English Midlands city of Leicester, where he attended Wyggeston Boys’ Grammar School. In April 1957, while rock climbing with friends in Charnwood Forest in Leicestershire, he saw what looked like a leaf embedded in the rock. Mason took a rubbing of the rock. He showed the rubbing to his father, the minister of Leicester's Great Meeting Unitarian Chapel, who also taught at Leicester University nearby and knew Trevor Ford, a geologist there. Mason took Ford to the site; Ford published the discovery in the Journal of the Yorkshire Geological Society. Ford identified it as a Precambrian fossil and named it Charnia masoni for the forest and Mason. Mason credits this first event of his geological career to "[his] father’s encouragement and the enquiring approach fostered by [his] science teachers".

The holotype (the actual physical example from which the species was first described) now resides, along with a cast of its related taxon Charniodiscus, in Leicester Museum & Art Gallery, Leicester. Decades later it was revealed that Tina Negus, then a 15-year-old schoolgirl, had seen this fossil a year before the boys, but her geography schoolteacher discounted the possibility of Precambrian fossils. Mason acknowledges, and the museum's Charnia display explains, that the fossil had been discovered a year earlier by Negus, "but no one took her seriously". She was recognised at the 50th anniversary celebrations of the official discovery.

Mason's discovery was mentioned by the February 2009 David Attenborough documentary Charles Darwin and the Tree of Life, and again in Attenborough's 2010 series First Life and the documentary that accompanied it, Attenborough's Journey. Attenborough, a keen fossil hunter as a boy, mentioned that he attended Wyggeston a few years prior to Mason, and had been in the same part of Charnwood a few years before Mason, but the prevailing wisdom at the time was that the rocks were too old to bear fossils and so Attenborough did not search for them.
