= Sheet Hedges Wood =

UK parish

Coordinates: 52°40′26.59″N 1°13′43.35″W

- Site of Special Scientific Interest
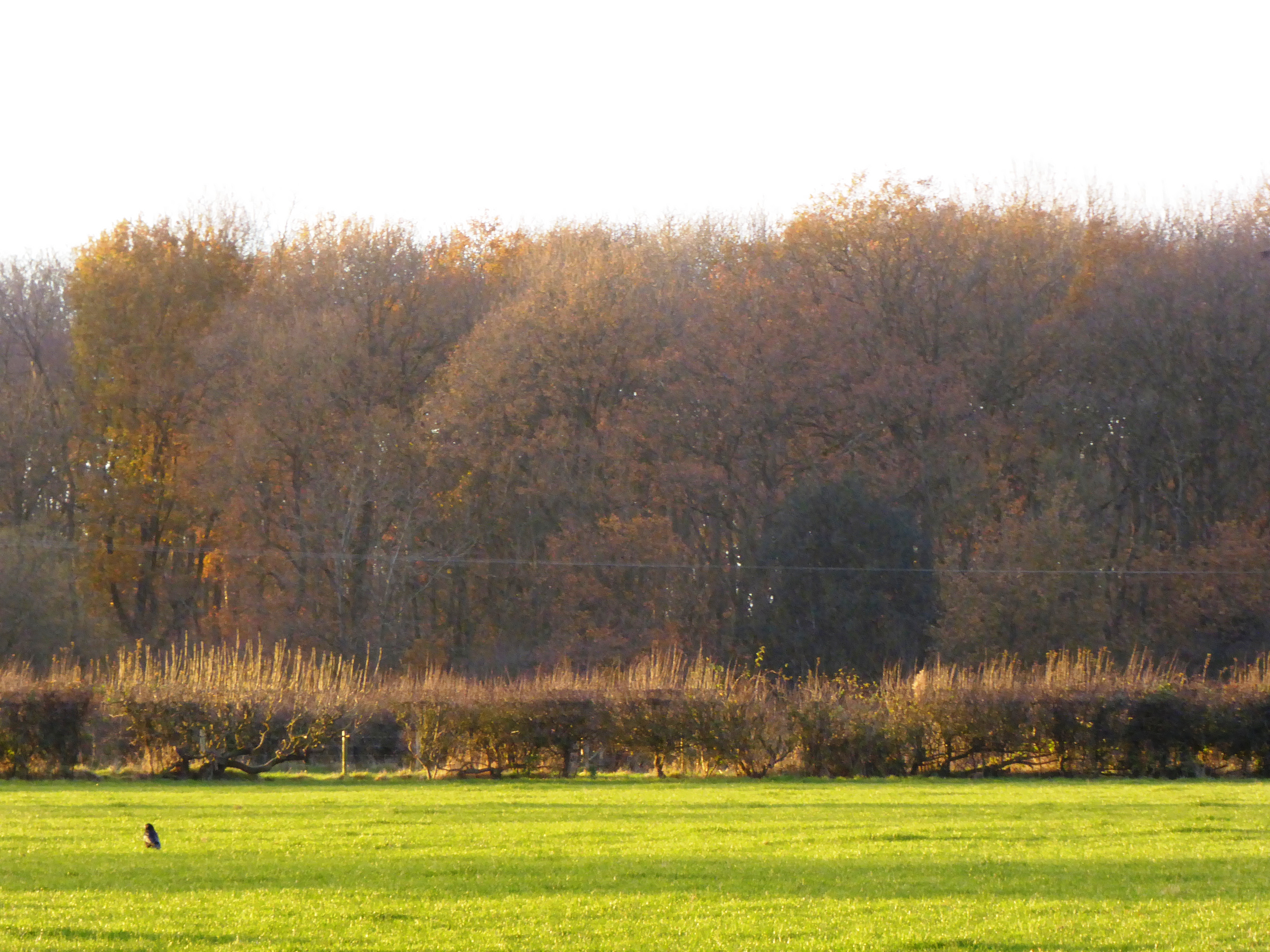
- Location of Sheet Hedges Wood.
- Area of search: Leicestershire
- Grid reference: SK 529 087
- Interest: Biological
- Area: 21.7 hectares (54 acres)
- Notification date: 1983
- Location map: Magic Map

Sheet Hedges Wood is in the parish of Newtown Linford, and lies some 1-mile (1.6 km) north of Groby, in Leicestershire, UK. The site is made up of two areas of woodland and a meadow field, all with public access, extending 29 acres (120,000 m^{2}). The woodland block is adjacent to the road includes a car park and access trails.

The larger eastern woodland is a 21.7 hectares (54 acres) biological Site of Special Scientific Interest. It is typical of ancient woods on clay soils in central and eastern England, and ash is dominant in the canopy, while the shrub layer has hazel, field maple, hawthorn, elder and privet.

Between the two woodland blocks, the fields have had some broadleaved tree planting, and encouragement of natural regeneration. An area of meadow is also managed as a wildflower hay meadow.

The wood and meadow are managed by Leicestershire County Council. Less than 1 kilometre (0.62 mi) south is Groby Pool, an area of natural open water, with its own car park. 1 kilometre (0.62 mi) north, accessed via a footpath or Groby Lane, is Bradgate Park, a large deer park and open public space.
