= Morley Quarry =

Nature reserve in Leicestershire, England

Coordinates: 52.757°N 1.296°W

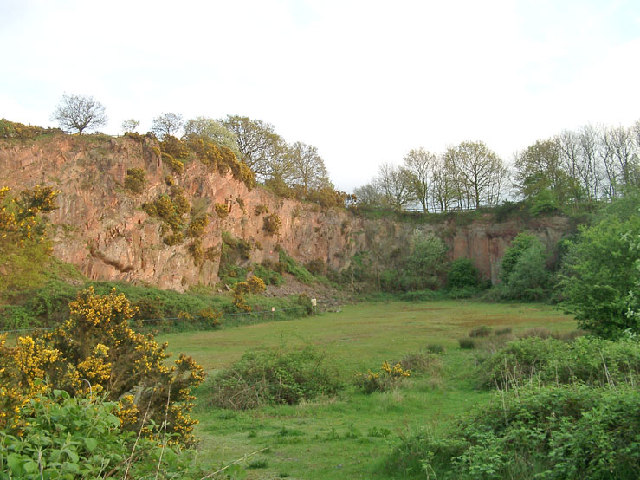
- Interactive map of Morley Quarry
- Type: Local Nature Reserve
- Location: Shepshed, Leicestershire
- OS grid: SK 476 179
- Area: 3.1 hectares (7.7 acres)

Morley Quarry is a 3.1 hectares (7.7 acres) Local Nature Reserve on the southern outskirts of Shepshed in Leicestershire.

The quarries are a Regionally Important Geological Site, with rocks dating to 600 million years ago. The habitat is grassland and heath, with heather and gorse. There is a pond which has breeding toads.

There is access from Morley Lane.
