= Jubilee Wood =

Woodland in Leicestershire, England

Coordinates: 52°44′38.85″N 1°14′45.77″W

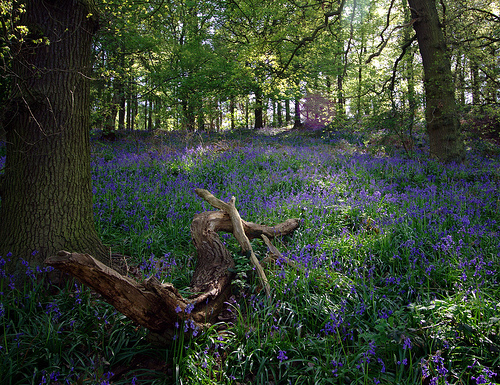
Jubilee Wood

Jubilee Wood comprises 10 hectares (25 acres) of mixed woodland with rocky outcrops. It was presented to Leicestershire County Council in 1977 to commemorate the Silver Jubilee of Elizabeth II.

The site is adjoining The Outwoods, managed by Charnwood Borough Council.
