= Church of the Annunciation of Our Lady of the Newarke =

Former church in Leicester, England

Coordinates: 52.6313°N 1.1397°W

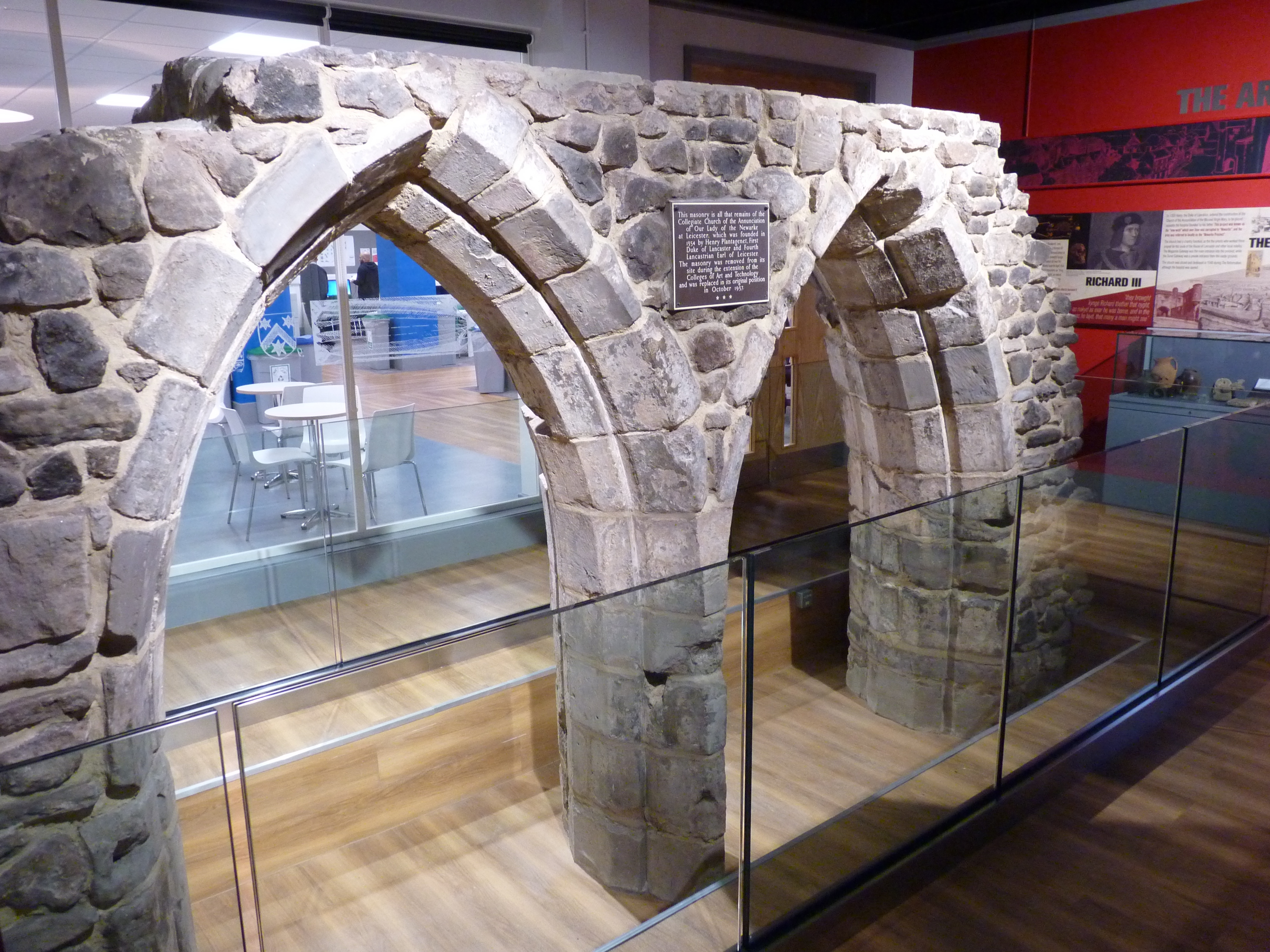
Newarke church arches, within the DMU heritage centre, Leicester

Map of central Leicester showing The location of the College of Our Lady of the Annunciation (marked in green) among the key sites of Leicester old town. The Roman and medieval walls are marked by the dotted line. The churches are marked in red, the dissolved religious houses in black, secular sites in blue, and the one surviving Roman ruin in purple.

The Church of the Annunciation of Our Lady of the Newarke in Leicester, England, was a collegiate church founded by Henry of Grosmont, 1st Duke of Lancaster, in 1353. The name "Newarke" is a translation of the Latin "novum opus" i.e. "new work" and was used to distinguish the church from the older collegiate church of Leicester Castle, the Church of St Mary de Castro. Duke Henry enlarged his father's hospital foundation in the southern extension to the castle bailey and built the new church to house a holy relic, part of the crown of thorns given him by John II of France. The church became a place of pilgrimage. John Leland visited it around 1540, shortly before its destruction during the Suppression of the Chantries. He described the church as "not very great...but exceeding fair."

== Use as a burial place ==
The church became an important burial place of notable members of the Lancastrian dynasty. Those buried here included:

- Henry, 3rd Earl of Lancaster
- Henry of Grosmont, 1st Duke of Lancaster — son of the above, grandfather of Henry IV of England.
- Constance of Castile, Duchess of Lancaster — second wife of John of Gaunt, daughter of Peter of Castile.
- Mary de Bohun — first wife of Henry IV, who died before he took the throne. She was the mother of Henry V of England.
- Mary Hervey, a member of John of Gaunt's household, who died c.1408, and whose alabaster tomb effigy was moved across the road to the chapel of the Trinity Hospital, where it still stands.

Early sources (the Frowyk Chronicle and the Ballad of Bosworth Field) strongly suggest that the church was where the naked corpse of Richard III of England was displayed after his death at Bosworth Field and prior to his burial in the Greyfriars priory.

== Current state ==
Only two arches survive from the original building, preserved in situ under what is now the Hawthorn Building of De Montfort University, where the public can see them in what is now the university's heritage centre.

== See also ==
Leicester Castle and The Newarke precinct, showing the Motte and bailey (green), boundary walls of The Newarke (blue), and the southern side of the town wall (red).
The historic sites include:-
1 Leicester Castle
2 Castle gateway
3 Church of St Mary de Castro
4 Turret gateway
5 Trinity House - former Trinity Hospital
6 Newarke Houses Museum
7 site of Church of the Annunciation of Our Lady of the Newarke, now includes DMU heritage centre
8 Magazine Gateway
9 South gates

Leicester's other museums

- Jewry Wall Museum
- New Walk Museum
- Abbey Pumping Station
- Leicester Guildhall
- Also, List of museums in Leicestershire
