= Magazine Gateway =

14th-century monument in Leicester, England

The Magazine Gateway (a.k.a. The Magazine and also called Newarke Gateway) is a Grade I listed building in Leicester. Now a solitary landmark alongside Leicester ringroad, it was originally the main gateway of a walled enclosure built around 1400, giving access to the religious precinct of The Newarke. The vaulted archway was open to traffic until 1905. The gatehouse rooms were variously used as a porter's lodge, guest accommodation, prison, militia building, and regimental museum. It is now a building managed by the Leicester Museum Service, and is generally only open to the public by arrangement.

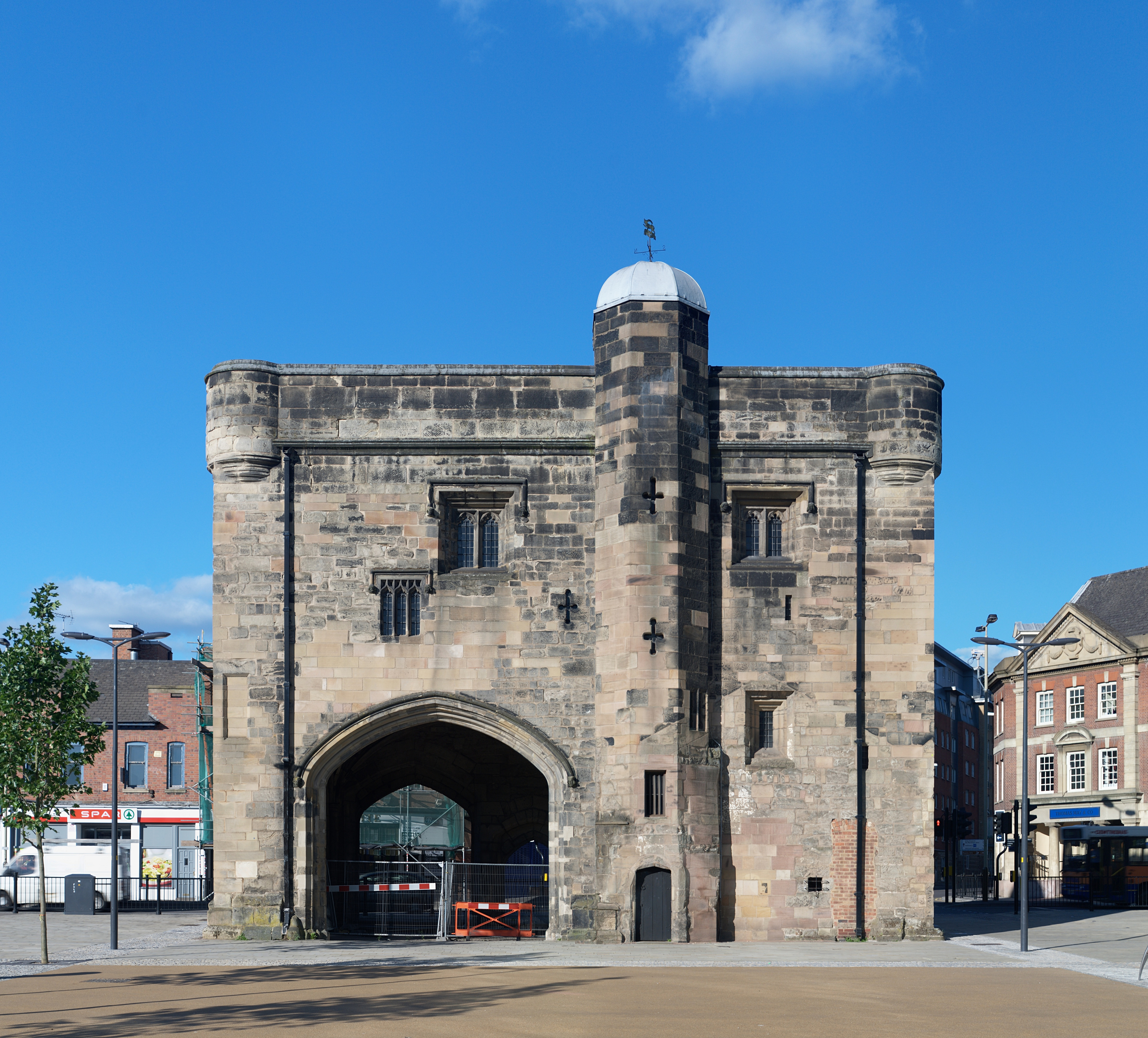
Magazine Gateway

== Site ==
Map of central Leicester showing the Magazine's place (shown in green) among the key sites of Leicester Old Town. The Roman and medieval walls are marked by the dotted line. The churches are marked in red, the monasteries in black, secular buildings in blue, and the one surviving Roman ruin in purple.

Leicester's South Gates were the entrance into the walled Roman and medieval town of Leicester. In medieval times an area just south of these, outside the walled town, was set aside as a religious precinct known as the Newarke (or New Work) and enclosed with a substantial wall and gatehouse. The only other gate into The Newarke gave access from Leicester Castle. The area of the Newarke is now substantially occupied by De Montfort University (DMU), and the Magazine Gateway stands at the eastern end of a pedestrianised area between the DMU Business and Law building and the Newarke Houses Museum. While the 'South Gates' now only exist as a street name, the Magazine Gateway stands as a prominent landmark where the carriageways of Leicester's inner ring-road diverge. On the north is the Southgates underpass, to the east is Newarke Street, while from the south traffic arrives along Oxford Street.

== Original purpose ==
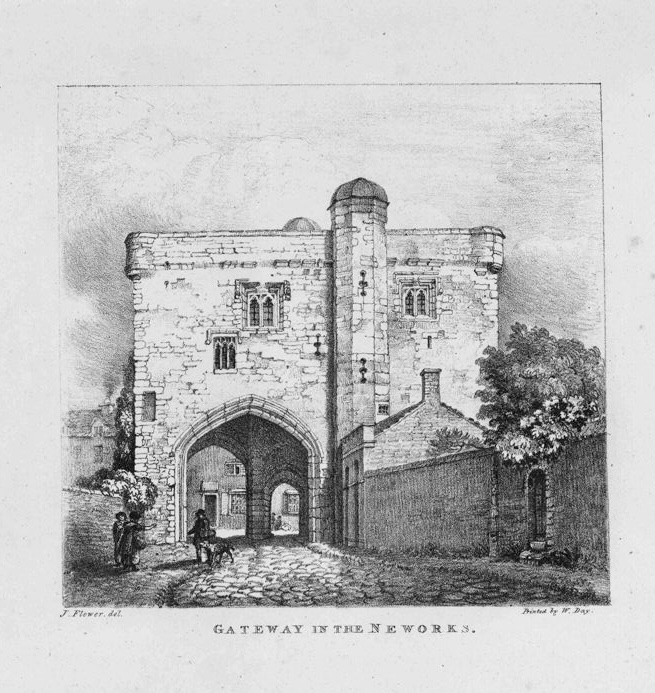
An 1826 print based on a painting by the Leicester artist, John Flower

The original purpose of the gateway was to provide a grand imposing entrance into the religious collegiate precinct of The Newarke. In 1330 the Trinity Hospital had been established by Henry, 3rd Earl of Lancaster in an area along the south side the castle wall. His son rose to be Duke of Lancaster and further aggrandised the area by founding a new collegiate Church of the Annunciation of St Mary which housed a holy relic claimed to be a thorn from Christ's crown of thorns. The Gateway was completed soon after 1400, at the same time as substantial walls which enclosed the college precinct. In 1967 The area was built over by the James Went building, and photographs suggest that until then, some of the walls remained up to a height of 3 metres (9.8 ft). In 2006, following demolition of the James Went building, excavations on the DMU PACE Building site found buried walls surviving to a height of 1.5 metres (4.9 ft).

The gatehouse itself has two archways, used to give pedestrian and carriage access from just outside the south gates of the town, into the walled precinct. Inside the Gatehouse are rooms on three storeys. These provided living accommodation for a porter and, on the first floor over the archways, guest accommodation for visitors to the college precinct. On at least two occasions, in 1440 and 1525, official visitations found, among a range of serious lapses within the college, concern over the porter allowing access to the precinct by 'unseemly people including women of late hours', and banned the selling food and drink from the precinct and gatehouse. The collegiate system was finally ended in 1548 as part of the English reformation. The College of canons was disbanded and the Church of the Annunciation destroyed. However the walled enclosure and gatehouse survived, as did the Trinity Hospital. The area became an exclusive residential tax haven, resulting in smart town houses such as Skeffington House, now the main part of Newarke Houses Museum.

== Military ==
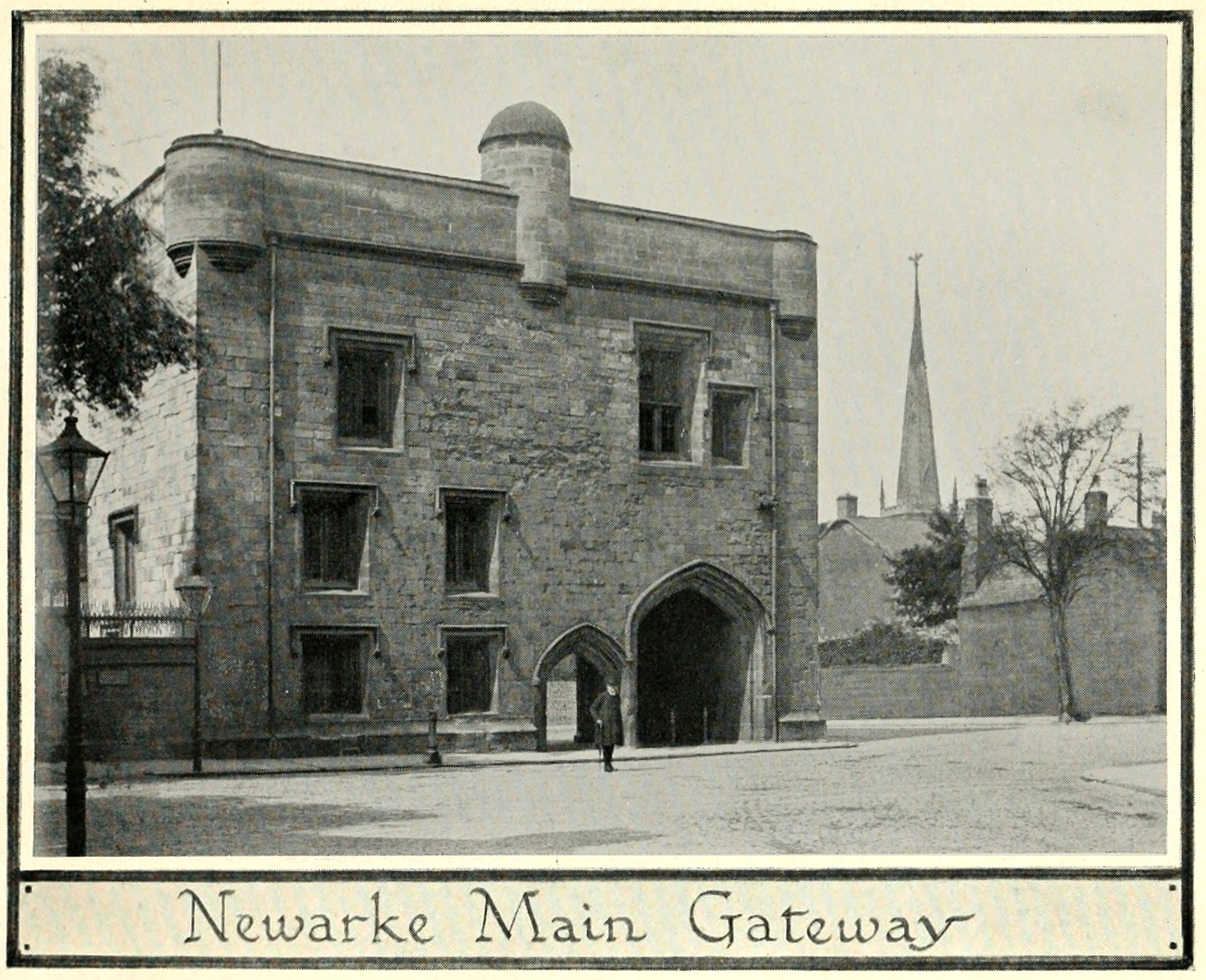
The Magazine in 1920 when it was still used by the local militia.

The Magazine acquired its present name during the English Civil War when, in 1642, it was first used by Parliamentarian Leicester for the storage of munitions. Attempts by the Royalists to disperse the weapons had little effect, and the area saw military action when, on 30/31 May 1645, the main Royalist Field Army from Oxford under Prince Rupert besieged then stormed Leicester taking possession of the Castle and The Newarke along with the rest of the Town. The area again saw military action when the Parliamentarians re-took the Town on 18 June 1645 after their own short siege of Leicester following their victory at the Battle of Naseby. By the 19th century it was used by the local militia, and also at times as a prison. Graffiti scratched on the walls suggest both prisoners and military occupants left their marks, including in 1809 and the 1940s. The 4th Battalion, the Leicestershire Regiment, created when the 1st Volunteer Battalion of the Leicestershire Regiment was split in 1908, was formed at the Magazine. The battalion was mobilised at the Magazine in August 1914 before being deployed to the Western Front. The Magazine was also used as the headquarters of the Leicestershire Yeomanry during the First World War.

== Museum and road schemes ==
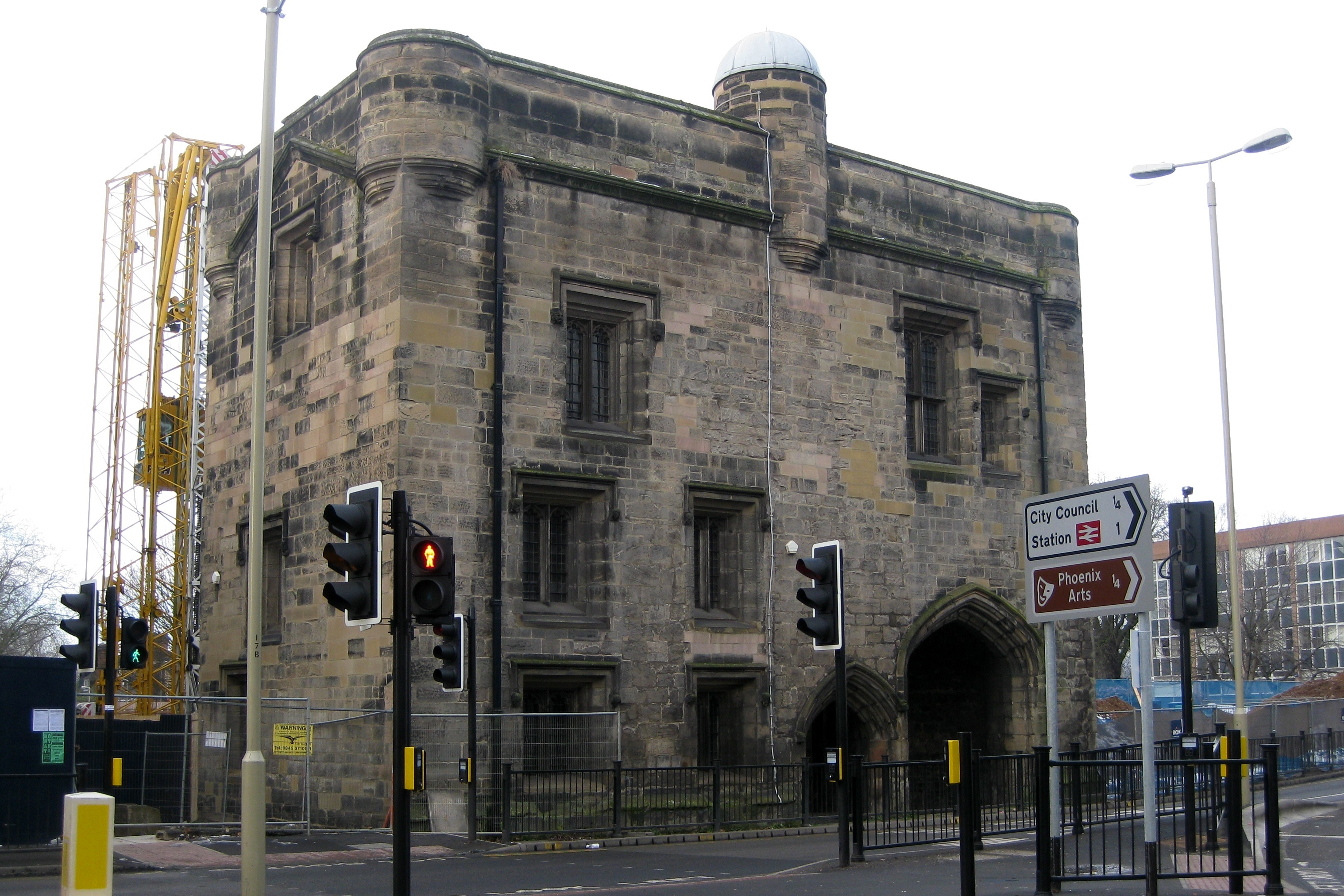
The Magazine in 2009 with road alterations and repairs to the building underway

The 1960s inner ring road scheme resulted in the Magazine being stranded with busy carriageways running both sides of it, with the only access being via pedestrian underpasses. In 1969 it was made available to the Royal Leicestershire Regiment for use as the regimental museum. It continued in this purpose until 1996 when repair work and the limited accessibility of the three-storey building brought that use to an end. The regimental museum subsequently re-opened on the upper floor of the Newarke Houses Museum.

The unsatisfactory treatment of a Grade I listed medieval building, set below the road level with traffic pounding past both sides, was finally addressed in 2007 with the filling in of the underpass. This allowed the street level on the west side to be brought back down to the same as the Magazine. The road was also shifted entirely to the east side of the gateway, and the area to the west pedestrianised, reuniting the gateway with the Newarke and creating a new open space for students at De Montfort University alongside the nearby Business and Law School.

== See also ==
Leicester Castle and The Newarke precinct, showing the Motte and bailey (green), boundary walls of The Newarke (blue), and the southern side of the town wall (red).
The historic sites include:-
1 Leicester Castle
2 Castle gateway
3 Church of St Mary de Castro
4 Turret gateway
5 Trinity House - former Trinity Hospital
6 Newarke Houses Museum
7 site of Church of the Annunciation of Our Lady of the Newarke, now includes DMU heritage centre
8 Magazine Gateway
9 South gates

Leicester's other museums:

- Jewry Wall Museum
- New Walk Museum
- Abbey Pumping Station
- Leicester Guildhall
- Also, List of museums in Leicestershire
