= Newarke Houses Museum =

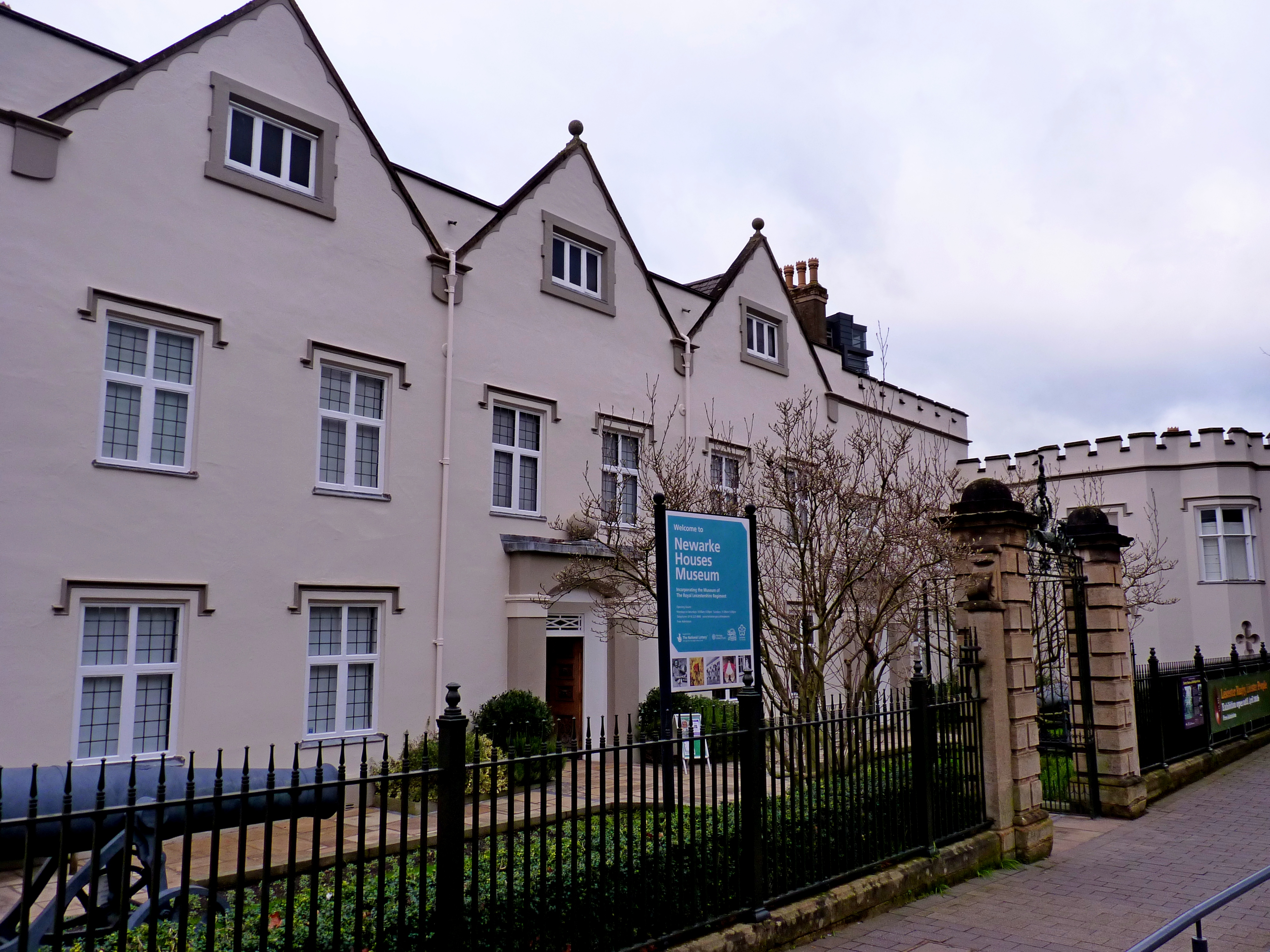
- Skeffington House

- Location in Leicester Location in Leicestershire
- Established: 1953
- Location: Leicester
- Coordinates: 52.631518°N 1.139428°W
- Type: Military Museum
- Website: Newarke Houses Museum

Map of central Leicester showing the location of the Newarke Houses Museum (marked in green) among the key sites of Leicester Old Town. The Roman and medieval walls are marked by the dotted line. The churches are marked in red, the monasteries in black, secular buildings in blue, and the one surviving Roman ruin in purple.

The Newarke Houses Museum is a public museum in Leicester, England. It incorporates the museum of the Royal Leicestershire Regiment, and has a range of exhibits illustrating post-medieval and contemporary Leicester. The museum is close to the 15th-century Magazine Gateway and within the precincts of the medieval 'Newarke', the 'New Work' of Henry of Grosmont, 1st Duke of Lancaster. The museum stands in the middle of the De Montfort University campus.

== History ==
Leicester Castle and The Newarke precinct, showing the Motte and bailey (green), boundary walls of The Newarke (blue), and the southern side of the town wall (red).
The historic sites include:-
1 Leicester Castle
2 Castle gateway
3 Church of St Mary de Castro
4 Turret gateway
5 Trinity House - former Trinity Hospital
6 Newarke Houses Museum
7 site of Church of the Annunciation of Our Lady of the Newarke, now includes DMU heritage centre
8 Magazine Gateway
9 South gates

The museum occupies two buildings: Wyggeston's Chantry House (built circa 1511), and Thomas Skeffington's Skeffington House (built in the 17th century). The houses were used during the Siege of Leicester in 1645 as part of the English Civil War. The two properties were sold in 1908 and, while Chantry House remained a private residence, Skeffington House became a school for boys. Both properties were acquired and converted for museum use in 1953 as part of the celebrations surrounding the coronation of Elizabeth II. One room on the ground floor of the museum represents the buildings' 17th-century interior.

== Collections ==
Amongst the items on display are various possessions of Daniel Lambert, an 18th-century resident of Leicester who weighed over 50 stone (320 kg) and became famous in his lifetime as Britain's largest man, and remains one of the city's famous icons. Possessions on display include items of clothing and his chair.

The museum also houses a 1950s Leicester street scene modelled in Wharf Street with a number of model shops, as well as an exhibition of toys from Tudor times to the present.

Other collections relate to Leicester's industrial and hosiery industry, such as Corah's and Wolsey, major clothing firms in Leicester. The museum has an exhibit with a particular focus on the more recent history of Leicester, from the 19th century onward.

During the period 2014 to 2018 it held a rolling series of exhibitions marking the centenary of the First World War entitled 'Leicester Remembers'. The museum also includes a display about the Royal Leicestershire Regiment, such as drums used by the regiment band, and a tiger, the mascot of the regiment. The museum houses a large collection of items relating to life during the wars. These cover aspects of the front-line and home front. The museum holds a large collection of medals, with records regarding the involvement of people within the Leicestershire Regiment, which can be accessed via a computer. A model trench sits on the first floor. Other items include a Morrison shelter and gas masks to reflect the home front during the Second World War.

== Gardens ==
The gardens of the museum are laid out on separate sides of the main building which has an extension into the garden. These are laid to box hedges in medieval style maze-like geometric patterns. The garden was stocked in Victorian times with a variety of exotic trees and other plants, several of which survive to the present day. The end wall of the garden has gun loops, cut in it by Cromwell's troops, the Roundheads, in 1645 during the English Civil War when the Cavalier Prince Rupert was besieging the town.

== See also ==
- Gateway Grammar School, formerly in Skeffington House
- Jewry Wall Museum
- New Walk Museum
- Abbey Pumping Station
- Leicester Guildhall
- Also, List of museums in Leicestershire
