= List of museums in Leicestershire =

This list of museums in Leicestershire, England contains museums which are defined for this context as institutions (including nonprofit organizations, government entities, and private businesses) that collect and care for objects of cultural, artistic, scientific, or historical interest and make their collections or related exhibits available for public viewing. Also included are non-profit art galleries and university art galleries. Museums that exist only in cyberspace (i.e., virtual museums) are not included.

Name	Image	Town/City	Type	Summary
Abbey Pumping Station		Leicester	Technology	Science and technology museum, housed in a Victorian sewage pumping station with beam engines restored to working order, and exhibitions on light and optics, historic transport and public health, including an 'interactive toilet'.
Ashby de la Zouch Museum		Ashby-de-la-Zouch	Local	local history, culture
Armourgeddon Military Museum		Husbands Bosworth	Military	military vehicles, guns, cannons and military paraphernalia
Belgrave Hall		Leicester	Historic house	Victorian period house showing the contrasting lifestyles of an upper-middle-class family and domestic servants
Belvoir Castle		Grantham	Historic house	Castle with gardens
Bosworth Battlefield Heritage Centre and Country Park	Battlefield Visitor Centre	Sutton Cheney	Military	History of the 1485 Battle of Bosworth during the War of the Roses, and the search for the site of the battle.
Charnwood Museum		Loughborough	Local	Area history, geology, archaeology and industries
Castle Donington Museum	Museum is in the stone building on the right	Castle Donington	Local	local history
Conkers		Moira	Natural history	nature, woodlands, visitor centre of The National Forest
Donington le Heath Manor House Museum		Coalville	Historic house	16th-century medieval period house
De Montfort University Heritage Centre		Leicester	Education & Medieval	Housed in the Hawthorne Building, it covers the history of The Newarke & Church of the Annunciation, Trinity Hospital building, DMU History and special exhibitions
East Midlands Aeropark		Castle Donington	Aviation	Includes complete airframes on external display, engines, aircraft components, photographs
Foxton Canal Museum		Foxton	Transportation	History of the Foxton Locks, lives of the canal workers and other aspects of the local canal
Fleckney Museum		Fleckney	Local	local history
Guru Nanak Sikh Museum		Leicester	Religious	Sikh art, history, culture; by appointment only.
Hallaton Museum		Hallaton	Local	local history
Harborough Museum		Market Harborough	Local	Local history, culture, industry, Hallaton Treasure
Hinckley and District Museum	Hinckley Town Museum	Hinckley	Local	local history, framework knitter`s cottage with 1740s knitting frame.
Jewry Wall Museum	View of the museum through the Jewry Wall	Leicester	Archaeology	Alongside Jewry Wall and site of Roman baths. The museum houses Roman mosaics and artifacts alongside archaeological material from prehistoric to medieval Leicester, including the history of archaeology in Leicester.
John Taylor & Co	Taylor's Bell Foundry	Loughborough	Music	Collection of bells used in clock towers, change ringing peals, chimes, and carillons
Kegworth Museum		Kegworth	Local	local history, archaeology.
King Richard III: Dynasty, Death and Discovery	Dynasty Death and Discovery, Richard III museum entrance	Leicester	Archaeology	Visitor Centre at the Greyfriars burial site, with exhibitions on the life and death of Richard III and the archaeological investigation on his remains.
Leicester Guildhall		Leicester	Medieval	Medieval half-timbered building with Victorian prison cells, and since 2015, galleries on Medieval Leicester
Loughborough Carillon & War Memorial		Loughborough	Military	World War I memorial, carillon, military museum
Loughborough Central Station		Loughborough	Railway	1950s period station museum on the Great Central Railway heritage railroad
Lutterworth Museum		Lutterworth	Local	, local history, Sir Frank Whittle display
Measham Museum	Measham station before it became a museum	Measham	Local	. Local history. Since 2009 it is housed in part of the disused railway station.
Melton Carnegie Museum	Melton Mowbray Museum	Melton Mowbray	Local	Local history and culture, including area Stilton cheese and pork pies. Museum in 1977, in former Andrew Carnegie Library.
Moira Furnace		Moira	Industry	19th-century iron-making blast furnace, with short boat rides on the restored canal.
National Gas Museum Leicester		Leicester	Industry	Gas industry museum, on production and supply of gas, and gas related artifacts and domestic appliances.
National Space Centre		Leicester	Science	Space science and astronomy
New Walk Museum and Art Gallery		Leicester	Multiple	Dinosaurs, geology, art, Ancient Egypt, natural history, world art
Newarke Houses Museum		Leicester	Multiple	Local history, room settings from the 17th century and the 1950s and 70s, toys, history of the Royal Leicestershire Regiment, period street scene
Old Rectory Museum		Loughborough	Local	operated by the Loughborough Archaeological and Historical Society
Retro Computer Museum		Thurmaston	Technology	preservation, display, and public experience of computer and console systems
Shackerstone Railwayana Museum		Shackerstone	Railway	Station and museum for the Battlefield Line Railway
Sir John Moore Heritage Centre		Appleby Magna	Education	1891 Victorian life in the then Sir John Moore Church of England School
Stanford Hall		Lutterworth	Historic house	William and Mary period house
Stonehurst Family Farm and Motor Museum		Mountsorrel	Multiple	Family farm and automobile museum
Stoneygate Tram Depot		Leicester	Transport Heritage	explores the history of public transport in Leicester and the surrounding areas, and provides bus rides on historic buses
Stoneywell	Stoneywell, Leicestershire	Ulverscroft	Historic house	Operated by the National Trust, summer home designed in the Arts and Crafts style by Ernest Gimson
Swannington Hough Mill		Swannington	Mill	Operated by Swannington Heritage Trust
Wigston Framework Knitters Museum		Wigston Magna	Industry	workshop with stocking frame equipment, hand frames for making gloves, mitts and fancy ribbed tops for golf hose
William Carey Museum		Leicester	Biographical	located at the Central Baptist Church, life and works of pioneer missionary William Carey

== Defunct museums ==
- Magazine Gateway Regimental Museum, Leicester, closed in 1996 (collection moved to Newarke Houses Museum).
- Museum of Costume, Leicester, closed in 2000
- City Gallery, Leicester, closed in 2010.
- Snibston Discovery Museum, Coalville, closed in July 2015.
- Donington Grand Prix Exhibition, Castle Donington, closed in 2018.
- Cold War Jets Collection, Bruntingthorpe, closed in June 2020.

== See also ==
- Category:Tourist attractions in Leicestershire
