= Alice Mary Hobson =

English painter

- Born: 1860
- Died: 1954 (aged 93–94)

Alice Mary Hobson (1860–1954) was an English landscape painter.

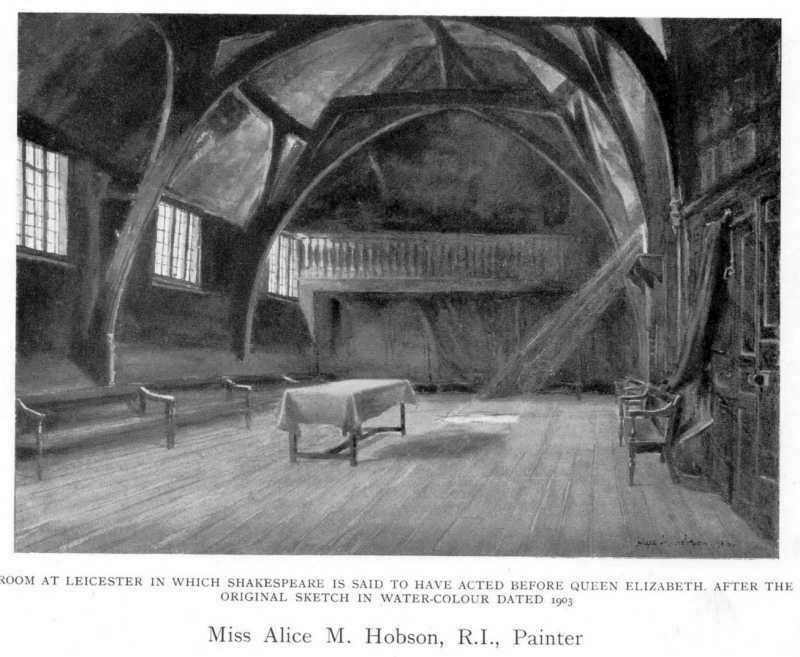
Room at Leicester in which Shakespeare is said to have Acted before Queen Elizabeth

She became a watercolourist and member of the Society of Painters in Watercolours and the Royal Institute of Painters in Water Colours in London from 1879. Her 1903 watercolour sketch of Leicester Guildhall called Room at Leicester in which Shakespeare is said to have Acted before Queen Elizabeth was included in the book Women Painters of the World. One of her works, "The Old Cock Pit," is held by the Royal Collection Trust and had been commissioned for the Library in Queen Mary's Dolls House.
