= Constance of Castile, Duchess of Lancaster =

Castilian-born English noblewoman (1354–1394)

Constance of Castile
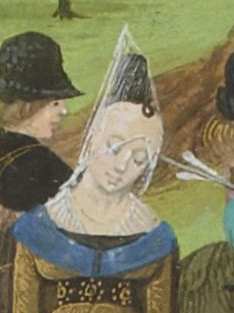
- Detail from Froissart's Chronicles, depicting Constance at the surrender of Santiago de Compostela to her husband

Duchess consort of Aquitaine
- Tenure: c. 1390 – 24 March 1394
- Born: 1354; Castrojeriz, Castile
- Died: 24 March 1394 (aged 39–40); Leicester Castle, Leicestershire, Kingdom of England
- Burial: Church of the Annunciation of Our Lady of the Newarke, Leicester
- Spouse: John of Gaunt, 1st Duke of Lancaster (m. 1371)
- Issue: Catherine, Queen of Castile
- House: Castilian House of Ivrea
- Father: Peter of Castile
- Mother: María de Padilla

Constance of Castile (Spanish: Constanza de Castilla, 1354 – 24 March 1394) was a claimant to the Crown of Castile. She was the daughter of King Peter, who was deposed and killed by his half-brother, King Henry II. She married the English prince John of Gaunt, who fought to obtain the throne of Castile in her name, but ultimately failed.

== Family ==
Constance was the daughter of King Peter and María de Padilla. Peter had secretly married María, but was forced to repudiate her. Their relationship endured throughout his subsequent marriages, however. Peter was killed in 1369 by his half-brother Henry II, who then ascended the throne. Constance remained outside Henry's control, besieged at Carmona. On 21 September 1371, at Roquefort, near Bordeaux, Guienne, she married the English prince John of Gaunt, 1st Duke of Lancaster. Constance's younger sister, Isabella, married John's younger brother Edmund of Langley, 1st Duke of York. John and Constance had a son, John (1374–1375), and a daughter, Catherine.

== Claim ==
A third son with no prospect of ascending the English throne, John intended to claim the throne of Castile in Constance's name. On 9 February 1372 Constance made a ceremonial entry into London as the queen of Castile, accompanied by John's eldest brother, Edward, the Black Prince, and an escort of English and Castilian retainers and London dignitaries. Crowds lined the streets to see her as she processed to the Savoy Palace in the Strand where she was ceremonially received by her husband, who had proclaimed himself king of Castile on 29 January.

John insisted that English nobles address him as "my lord of Spain", but was unsuccessful in his attempts to obtain the crown. His and Constance's daughter, Catherine, was married to Henry II's grandson, Henry III, thus uniting these two rival claims.

Constance was made a lady of the Garter in 1378. She died at Leicester Castle and was buried at the Church of the Annunciation of Our Lady of the Newarke, Leicester.
