= Ashby de la Zouch Museum =

Local museum in Ashby de la Zouch, Leicestershire

Coordinates: 52°44′55″N 1°28′13″W

The Ashby-de-la-Zouch Museum is a museum in the Leicestershire town of Ashby-de-la-Zouch. The primary aim of the museum is to educate the public about the history of the town. The museum also has a number of temporary exhibitions. The museum opened its doors in 1982, with the museum relocating to its present location on North Street in Ashby-de-la-Zouch. The museum is run by a group of approximately 70 volunteers.

== Collections ==
The museum shows the history of Ashby from early times to the modern day. The history of the town is shown by a number of displays, recreations and artefacts. The collection is based on the history of the town of Ashby and the surrounding villages of Packington, Blackfordby, Smisby, Staunton Harold, Breedon, Lount and Coleorton. The museum holds as many as 3000 photographs documenting the history of the town and surrounding communities.

The museum holds maps going back several hundred years as well as photographs and a large quantity of documentary material. These include newspaper cuttings, letters and material regarding Ashby Grammar School. Microfilm copies of the Ashby census records have also been processed and documented by the museum.
