= De Montfort University =

Public university in Leicester, England

Coordinates: 52°37′47″N 1°08′20″W

De Montfort University Leicester
- Coat of arms
- Former names: Leicester School of Art; Leicester Colleges of Art and Technology; Leicester Polytechnic
- Motto: Latin: Excellentia et studium
- Motto in English: Excellence and Zeal
- Type: Public
- Established: 1870 as Leicester School of Art; 1992 – university status
- Affiliations: Association of Commonwealth Universities; EUA; Universities UK
- Endowment: £2.56 million (2022)
- Budget: £234.6 million (2021–22)
- Chancellor: Akram Khan
- Vice-Chancellor: Katie Normington
- Students: 23,155 (2024/25)
- Undergraduates: 17,340 (2024/25)
- Postgraduates: 5,815 (2024/25)
- Location: Leicester, England
- Campus: London, Dubai, Almaty, Kazakhstan and Phnom Penh, Cambodia
- Website: dmu.ac.uk

De Montfort University Leicester (DMU) is a public university in Leicester, England. The university traces its origins to the Leicester School of Art, founded in 1870, and gained university status in 1992 under the Further and Higher Education Act. It is named after Simon de Montfort, a 13th-century Earl of Leicester who played a major role in England's constitutional development.

The university has 23,155 students (as of 2024/25). The university is organised into three faculties: Business and Law; Health and Life Sciences; and Technology, Arts, and Culture.) It is a member of the Association of Commonwealth Universities.

In addition to its Leicester campus, the university opened a London campus in 2025 focused on postgraduate courses in business, digital technology, leadership and sustainability. The university also operates international campuses and teaching partnerships, including DMU Dubai and collaborative programmes in Kazakhstan and Cambodia.

== History ==
=== Origins ===
The university's origins lie in the Leicester School of Art, established voluntarily in 1870. The school expanded in response to the changing needs of late 19th-century industry, leading to the introduction of subjects such as engineering, building and machine drawing. By 1897, it was clear the buildings being used were no longer suitable. £25,000 was raised to build "a very handsome school that would be enormous credit to the town and ... so that it would answer its purpose for the next 100 years". The building in question is the Hawthorn Building, which still houses the sciences today, in the shape of the Faculty of Health and Life Sciences. At the time of the first phase of its construction, there were 500 art students and 1,000 technical students. In 1903, a letter from His Majesty's Inspector praised the success of the technical subjects. Increasing demand for courses prompted an extension to the Hawthorn Building in 1909. In 1919, further properties were rented. The Duchess of Atholl laid the foundation stone of Hawthorn's new west wing in 1927; by then, the establishment was known by the joint name of The Leicester Colleges of Art and Technology.

In 1930, the college was recognised for the University of London external degree course in Pharmacy and the Pharmaceutical Chemist Diploma of the Royal Pharmaceutical Society of Great Britain. In 1934, the University of London recognised the college as suitable for preparing students for the External Degree in Engineering, and so the courses on offer developed apace. The prospectus for 1936–37 included details of various technically based schools, including the Schools of Architecture, Building and Building Crafts, and Engineering. The fourth phase of extensions to the Hawthorn Building was completed in 1938–39. The first accommodation was secured in 1946, when the university purchased three houses.

More space was needed to meet the academic demand, and so in 1948, F. Bray, Under Secretary of the Ministry of Education, opened the converted Downings Warehouse. In 1966, the new Fletcher building was opened by the Queen Mother. In the same year, a white paper, "A Plan for Polytechnics and Other Colleges", was published, leading to the creation of the City of Leicester Polytechnic.

=== City of Leicester Polytechnic ===
On 1 April 1969, it was the fourth polytechnic to be established, by Edward Short, Baron Glenamara, to be one of around 30 polytechnics planned.

Under the Education Reform Act 1988, Leicester Polytechnic became a Higher Education Corporation, with Dame Anne Mueller appointed Chancellor in June 1991.

==== Fashion and textiles ====
By 1971, it had a well-established fashion department that produced fashion shows.

Janet Reger, with her husband Peter Reger, set up a well-known lingerie company in 1966, and had trained in the department in the 1950s, when it was under Leicester College of Art. Leicestershire woman Liz Szadbey studied Fashion at the Art College and, with her husband George Davies, founded Next plc in 1982; she later became the design director of Mothercare.

The department was nationally known for its work in Contour Fashion (lingerie and corsets) and Knitwear Technology in the Fletcher Building. It was the only degree in Contour Fashion in Europe, which started in 1947 at the request of the Corset Guild of England. Swimwear design started in 1965. The Qiana fabric of DuPont was designed in the mid-1970s, along with Lycra elastane fabric. Nearly all of the students in the School of Contour Design were female, with only one or two exceptions. It worked with the British Clothing Industry Association in the 1990s.

In the 1980s, M&S had a university sponsorship scheme for 19 students taking Textiles courses at UMIST in Manchester, the University of Leeds and Leicester Polytechnic. In the 1980s, the department's fashion students were often offered jobs before their course had finished, mostly Contour Fashion students. The Polytechnic had the UK's largest faculty of art and design.

In cooperation with 22 companies, 4 universities, and the DTI, an automated knitwear research centre known as CIMTEX (Computer Integrated Manufacture of Textiles), and a factory costing £7.6m, would be established from 1990. It opened in January 1992.

=== University status ===
Leicester Polytechnic became De Montfort University under the Further and Higher Education Act in 1992, establishing it as a degree-awarding body in its own right.

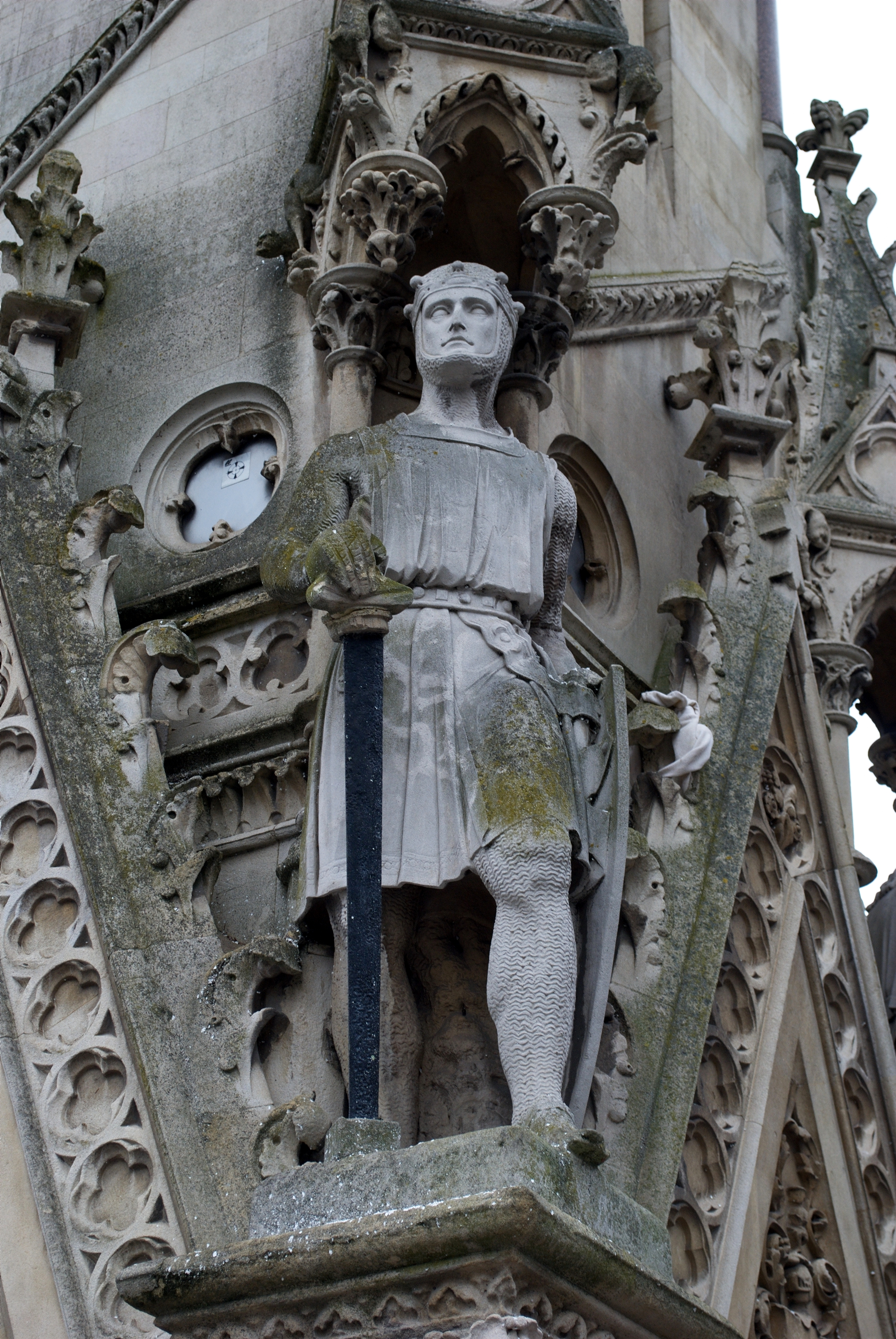
A statue of Simon de Montfort on the Haymarket Memorial Clock Tower in Leicester

The name De Montfort University was chosen in allusion to Simon de Montfort, Earl of Leicester, a prominent figure in establishing the Parliament of England in the 13th century. Honouring Simon de Montfort has been controversial, as in 1231 he expelled the Jews from Leicester. By taking his name, the university's commitment to community values has been questioned.

From 6 August 1993, 550 cinemas showed a 30-second advert, and a TV advert was broadcast on Channel 4 from Monday 9 August until mid-October in 1993. The television advert was designed for people aged 17 to 19, and it was the first time cinema, television, and print had advertised a university.

A £500,000 30-second cinema and TV commercial was shown again in mid-August 1994, with the first showing in Milton Keynes. Its message was 'Preparation for Life', voiced by Angus Deayton. The TV adverts ran from 15 August to 25 September 1994 on Channel 4 in Greater London, the Midlands and the North.

==== Expansion and contraction ====
In the 1990s, the institution aimed to become a multi-campus collegiate university covering the entire East Midlands, and as such, it swiftly acquired other campuses. Leicester Polytechnic built a new campus in Kents Hill in Milton Keynes, across the road from the Open University – the first brand-new higher education campus built in Britain for twenty years. It took its first students in 1991 and was officially opened by Queen Elizabeth II in 1992, before the official foundation of De Montfort University as a New University; it was branded The Polytechnic: Milton Keynes until it became De Montfort University, Milton Keynes. Departments at Milton Keynes included Computer and Information Sciences, Built Environment and Business.

On Thursday 9 December 1993, the Queen arrived at Leicester railway station, visited Leicester Royal Infirmary, and in the afternoon visited the university to open the £9m Queen's Building, which houses the Engineering department.

In 1994 De Montfort University took over the higher education activities of the Bedford College of Higher Education, while the further education section remained independent under the name Bedford College. The university absorbed the Lincolnshire College of Art in Lincoln, and the Lincolnshire College of Agriculture and Horticulture in Caythorpe, Lincolnshire in 1994; and the Riseholme Agricultural College in Riseholme, Lincolnshire and the Leicester-based Charles Frears College of Nursing and Midwifery in 1995.

Since 2000, the university's expansionist policy has been reversed, with all outlying campuses being sold off. The Bedford campus merged with the University of Luton to form the University of Bedfordshire; the campuses in Lincolnshire were transferred to the University of Lincoln; and the Milton Keynes campus was closed in 2003, with its buildings taken over by the Open University. The institution divested itself of its last outlying site, Charles Frears (on London Road in Leicester), in 2011, when the nursing school moved to the city centre campus.

==== Present day ====
Its campus comprises ten halls of residence offering around 3,000 university-sourced rooms, and is approximately a ten-minute walk from Leicester city centre.

The proceeds from the campus sales have been ploughed back into the Leicester City Campus, which has consequently seen a large amount of development, including the construction of two new buildings and the extensive refurbishment of a third, the Edith Murphy building (formerly Bosworth House) to house the students and staff of the School of Nursing and Midwifery, previously based at Charles Frears.

The Performance Arts Centre for Excellence (PACE), funded by a £4.5 million grant from the Higher Education Funding Council for England, opened in 2007 and was opened by the BBC's Creative Director, Alan Yentob. A new building for the Faculty of Business and Law – the Hugh Aston building – designed by CPMG Architects opened in September 2009. The new Business and Law centre has the Magazine Square at its centre and cost £35 million.

The university's new sports facility, named the Queen Elizabeth II Diamond Jubilee Leisure Centre, opened on campus on 30 July 2012, with Vice-Chancellor Dominic Shellard. The former John Sandford Site was renovated into a conference and events centre called The Venue@DMU. This was opened in September 2015. A new Arts and Design building opened in the centre of the Campus in September 2016: the Vijay Patel Building (also by CPMG Architects), split into the Arts Tower and the Design Wing.

In 2019, Vice-Chancellor Shellard resigned ahead of an Office for Students report that found serious and systematic governance failures under his leadership.

The university opened a London campus in 2025 focused on postgraduate courses in business, digital technology, leadership and sustainability. The university also operates international campuses and teaching partnerships, including DMU Dubai and collaborative programmes in Kazakhstan and Cambodia.

== Campus ==
Map showing some of the principal buildings of DMU campus:
1 Campus Centre Building (2003) designed by Ellis Williams Architects
2 Kimberlin Library
3 Queens Building (1993) houses the Faculty of Technology.
4 Hawthorn Building (1890), Health and Life Sciences. (Includes DMU Heritage Centre with medieval church arches, Grade II listed.)
5 Trinity House (1331), former almshouses founded by the Dukes of Lancaster. Vice-Chancellor's office. Grade II listed.
6 Chancellor's House (1772) & Philip Tasker Building, a much-extended Georgian townhouse converted for school use in the 1930s—Grade II listed.
7 Chantry Building (14th century), built as a house for Chantry priests, later a vicarage—Grade II listed.
8 Great Hall of Leicester Castle (11th century, with 17th century frontage). Business School. Grade I listed.
9 Gateway House (1960)
10 Hugh Aston Building (2009), Business and Law faculty
11 Queen Elizabeth II Diamond Jubilee Leisure Centre (2012)
12 The Venue @ DMU (1909), built as a roller skating rink and cinema. Refitted in 2015.
13 Vijay Patel Building (2016), Arts, Design and Humanities.

The Leicester campus is close to Leicester Castle and occupies what was once a religious precinct of the castle, built by the earls and dukes of Lancaster, known as the Newarke. It is bordered by the 15th-century Magazine Gateway or Newarke Gateway, and the campus contains listed buildings, including Trinity House, rebuilt in 1901 and containing part of the original 14th-century Hospital of the Annunciation building. The Hawthorn Building contains the ruins of the 1353 Church of the Annunciation of Our Lady of the Newarke, where the body of King Richard III is said, according to early sources, to have been displayed before his burial at Greyfriars. The ruins form the centrepiece of the De Montfort University Heritage Centre, opened in March 2015. In addition to the ruins, the Centre also celebrates the history of the university and contemporary student work.

The campus has seen several recent developments as part of a ten-year, £200 million initiative by the university, such as the £35 million Hugh Aston Building, which was constructed to move students from the Faculty of Business and Law closer to the centre of the university's infrastructure.

In 2016, the Vijay Patel Building was opened. The Vijay Patel Building is home to art and design courses. It is the centrepiece of the £136 million Campus Transformation Project which aims to "provide DMU with one of the finest city centre campuses in the country". The building is named after Dr Vijay Patel, who, alongside his wife, made the single largest donation by individuals in the university's history.

=== Campus Centre ===
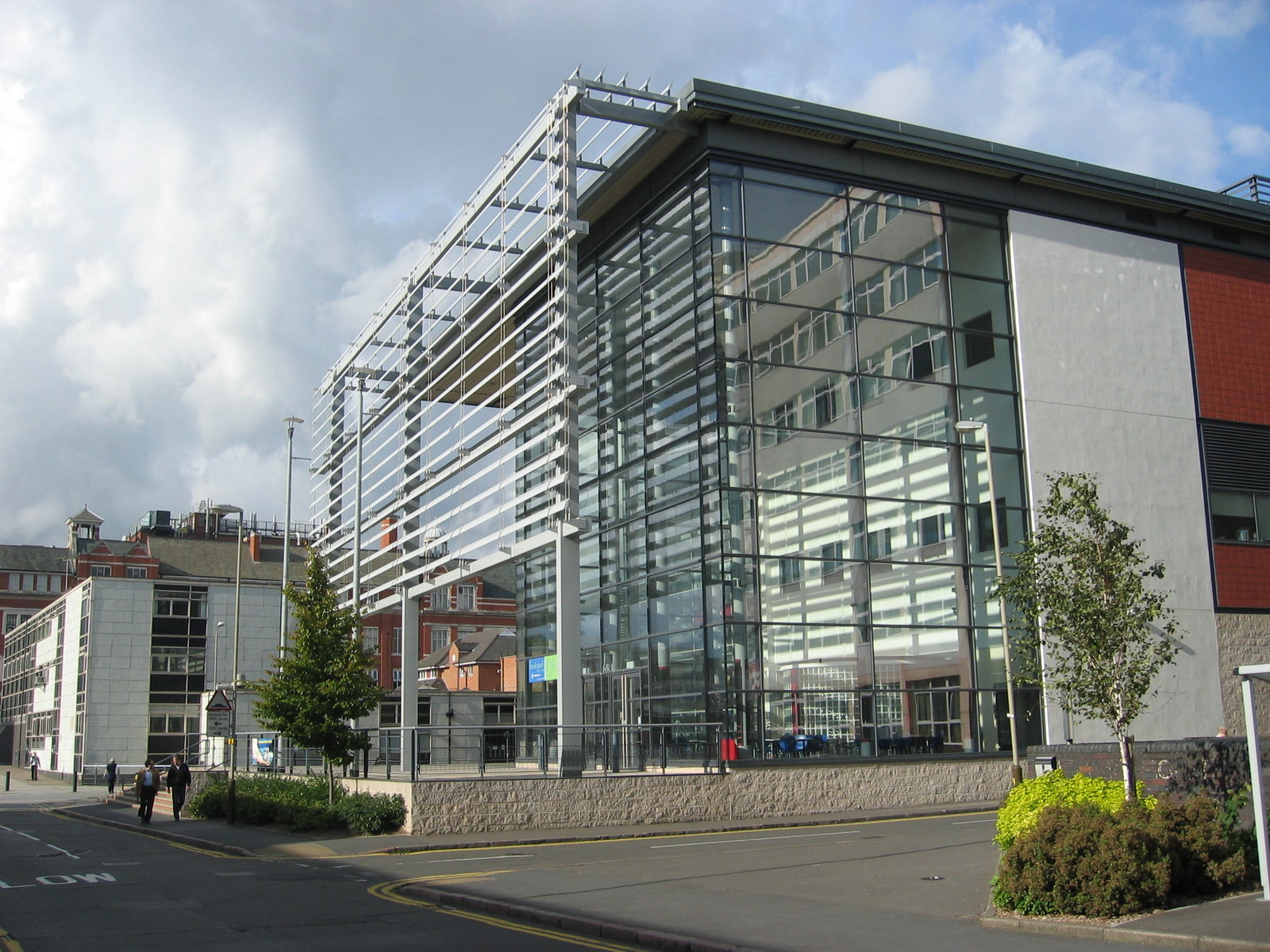
The Campus Centre Building

The Campus Centre offers numerous facilities for students. The building was completed in September 2003, serving multiple functions and providing a wide range of services. The building is a three-storey building designed by Ellis Williams Architects, the company responsible for the Baltic Centre for Contemporary Art in Gateshead. It was constructed on the site of the old Stibbe building for £8.5 million and is central to the university's 'Masterplan', which seeks to regenerate the Leicester campus environment. It houses the De Montfort University Students' Union, which comprises various societies such as Demon FM, a student radio station; Demon TV; and The Demon, a student-run newspaper published fortnightly during term time. It also has a Student Night Club called Injunction with two rooms on the second floor.

The Union operates a lettings agency in a joint venture with the University of Leicester Students' Union. The service which operates from both campuses is known as SULETS.

=== Library and Learning Services ===
The four Library sites on campus consist of the main Kimberlin Library and three ancillaries. Many Library functions are also available off campus at any time, including electronic resources such as academic databases, and online account management facilities such as book renewal.

The Kimberlin Library is a four-storey building opened in 1977, extended in 1997 and extensively refurbished in 2007. The ground-floor Learning Zone opened as part of the 2007 refurbishment and provides space for group and individual work. Kimberlin Library has an overall seating capacity of around 1250. The upper floors of the library cater for more traditional Quiet and Silent study needs. Further investment in 2011 saw the opening of the library Archives and Special Collections rooms and a dedicated Research Postgraduate Study Room. The library also provides facilities, including dedicated study rooms for students with disabilities and special needs.

The Eric Wood Learning Zone, on the ground floor of the adjacent Eric Wood Building, was extended and developed into a second Learning Zone, providing 180 more study places. This was opened on 12 January 2009.

The Law Library is situated in the Hugh Aston Building, which opened in September 2009. Leicester Law School is one of only a few in the country to have a dedicated Law Library on site within the teaching building. One room in this library houses the separate Legal Practice Course library, which only students on that course can access.

== Organisation and governance ==
=== Technology, Arts, and Culture (TAC) ===
Created from a merger in September 2025 of the previous Faculty of Art, Design and Humanities and Computing, Engineering and Media.

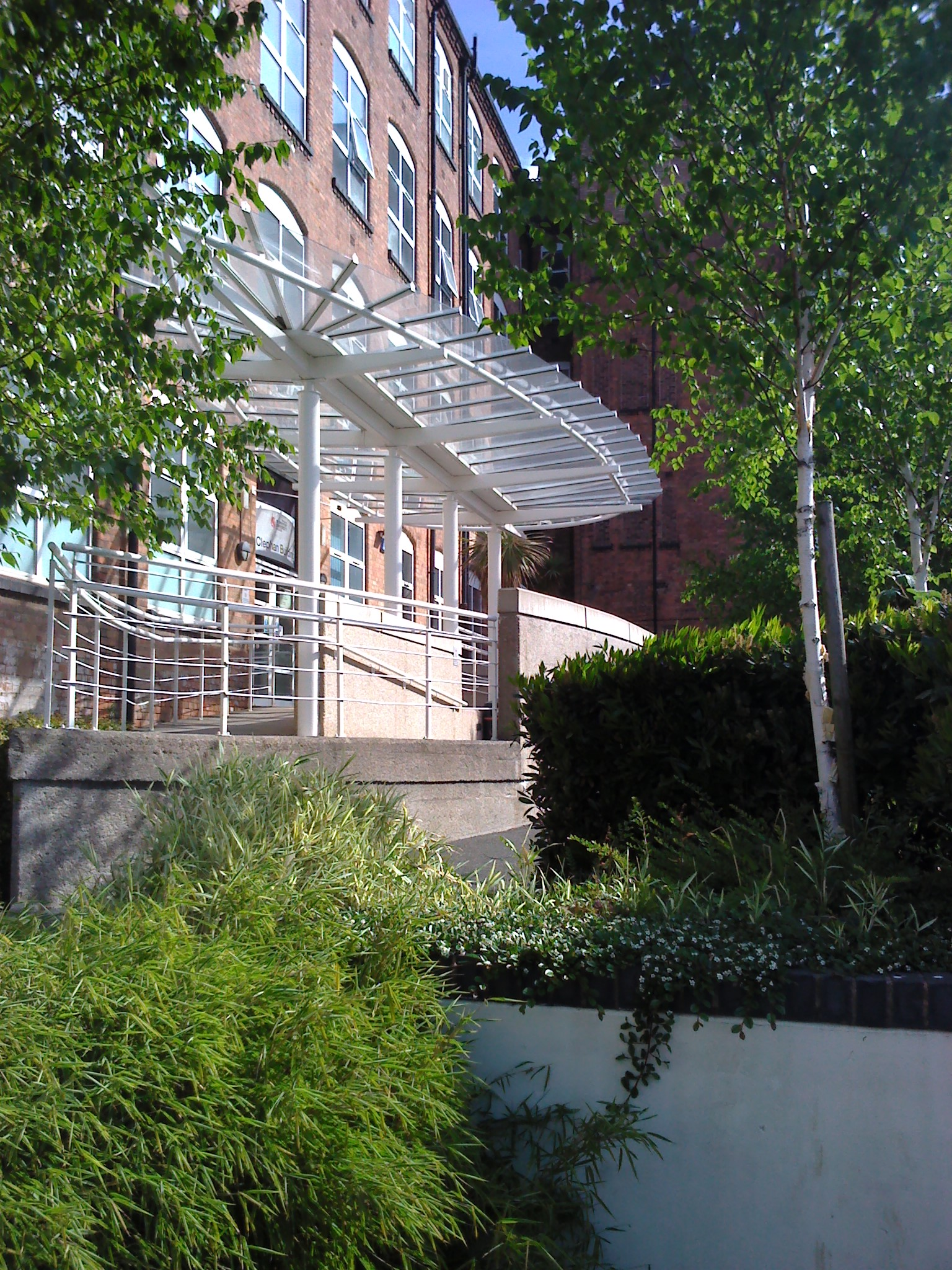
The Clephan building, home to the former Faculty of Humanities

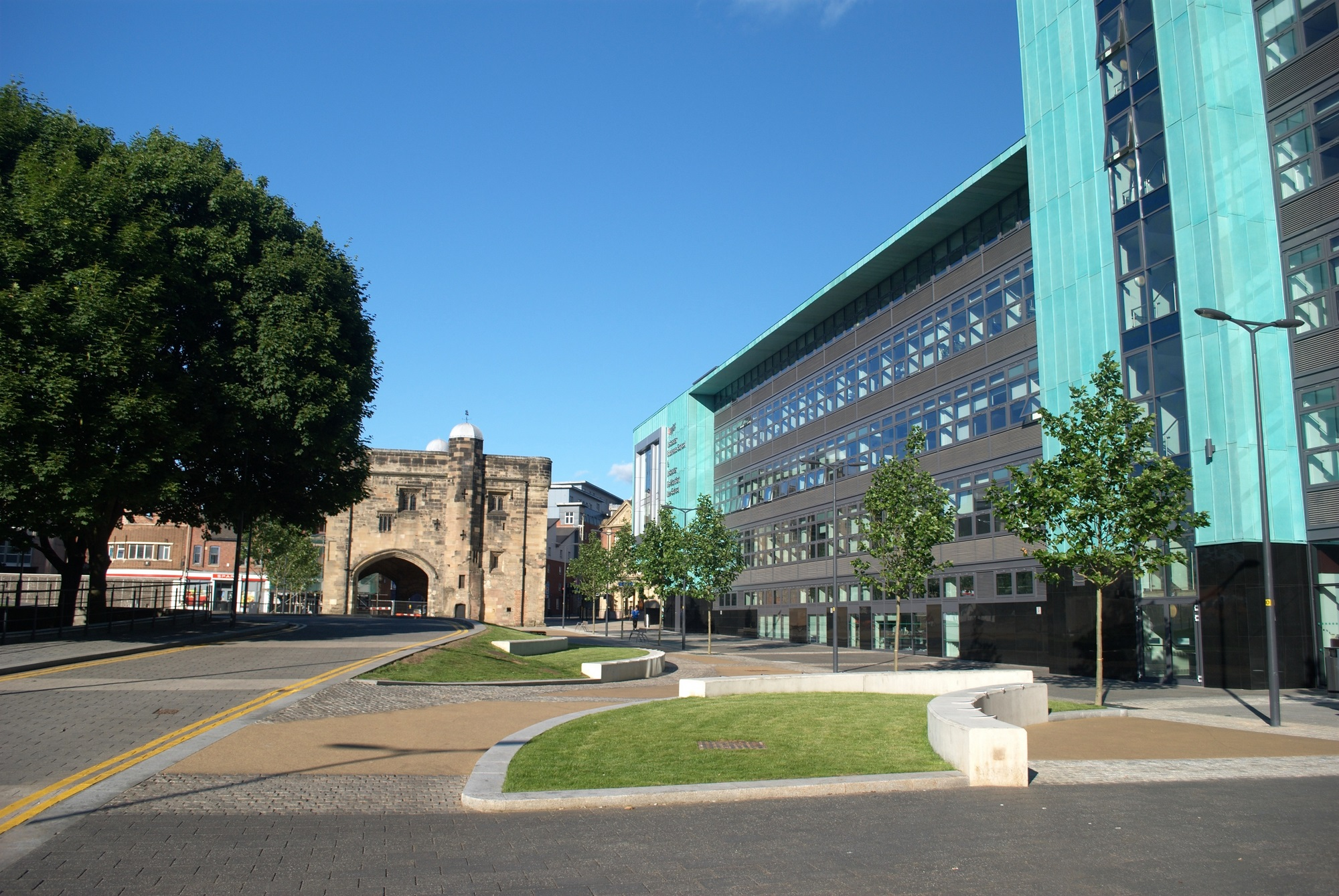
Magazine Square, with the Hugh Aston Building and the medieval Magazine Gateway

The Faculty of Art, Design and Humanities offered traditional humanities subjects, including English and History, as well as more design-based courses in areas such as Architecture and Fine Art.

Within its humanities division, the Faculty currently holds five National Teacher Fellows; the latest being Deborah Cartmell, Reader in English, who was made a Fellow in recognition of excellence in teaching and learning support. Cartmell developed the university's pioneering Master's degree in Adaptation Studies and is a founding member of the British Shakespeare Association and the Association of Adaptation Studies.

Humanities subjects are taught within the Clephan Building. The Clephan Building hosts the Cultural Exchanges event, which features guests and speakers from the arts, media, literature, politics and film.

Recently, the Faculty has collaborated with two other European universities to offer a new Master's course, based in its International Centre for Sports History and Culture: the MA Management, Law and Humanities of Sport. Organised by Centre International d'Etude du Sport (CIES) and endorsed by FIFA, the course was created to promote management education within the sports world. It is ostensibly recognised as one of the top graduate programmes in sport. The Humanities of Sport module is organised by the International Centre for Sport History and Culture at De Montfort. In contrast, the Management of Sport module is taught by SDA Bocconi School of Management in Italy, and the final Sports Law module is taught by Université de Neuchâtel in Switzerland. As of 2010, the course has produced more than 200 graduates from over 70 different nations.

The Faculty boasts the only university courses in the world specialising in lingerie, underwear, body-wear, swimwear, and performance sportswear, which began after the Second World War. The Faculty also offers the only UK university courses in Footwear Design.

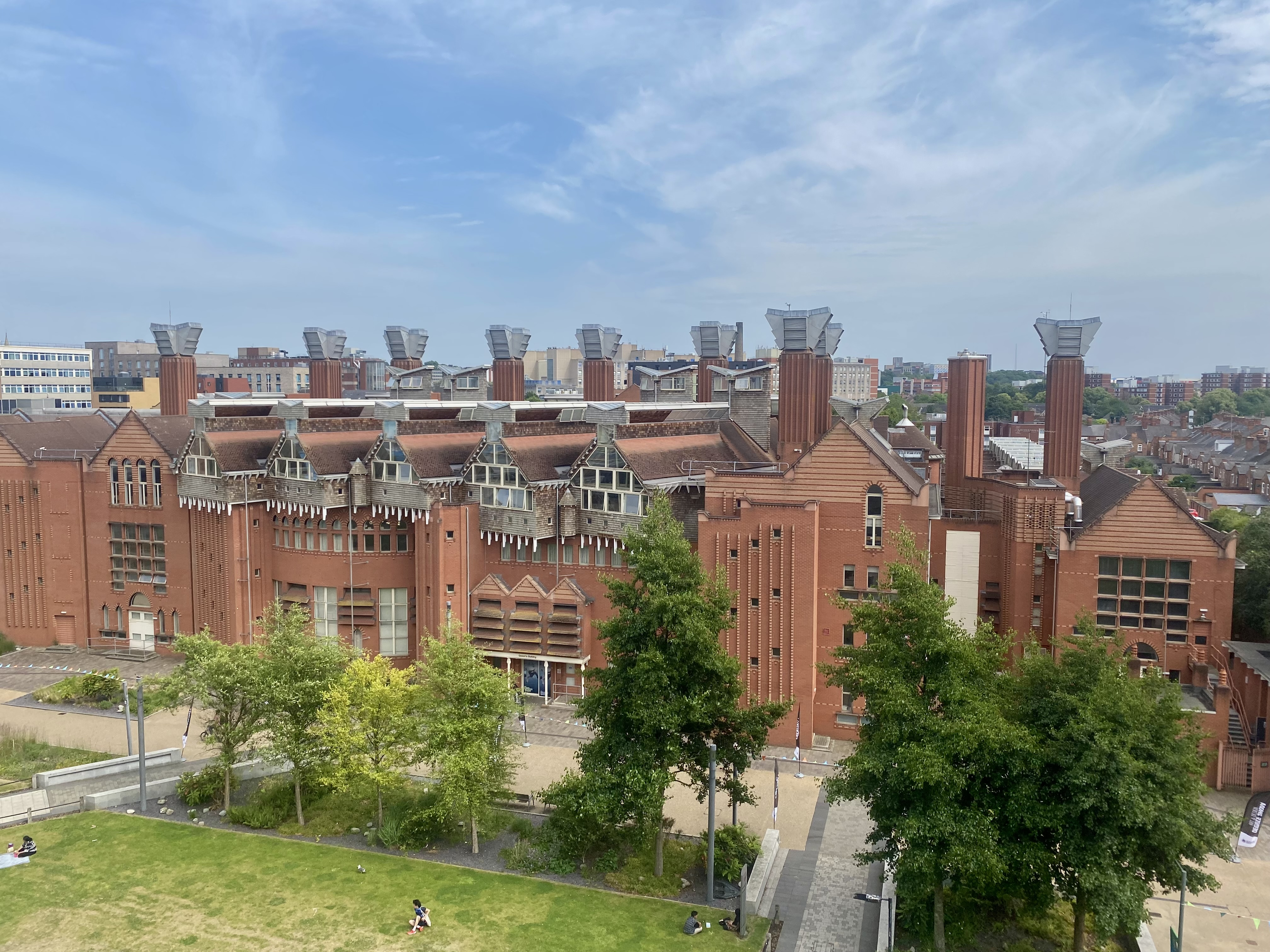
The Queens Building houses the Faculty of Technology.

The Faculty of Computing, Engineering and Media descended from the old Leicester College of Technology. It comprised the School of Engineering, the Leicester Media School and the School of Computing.

The main faculty building is the Queens Building; its unique design means it does not need cooling, as it controls the temperature through a series of vents.

=== Faculty of Business and Law ===
The Faculty of Business and Law incorporates the Leicester Castle Business School and the Leicester De Montfort Law School. The Faculty has a long history of international partnerships; in 1997, it collaborated to help found a business school in India – the Daly College Business School.

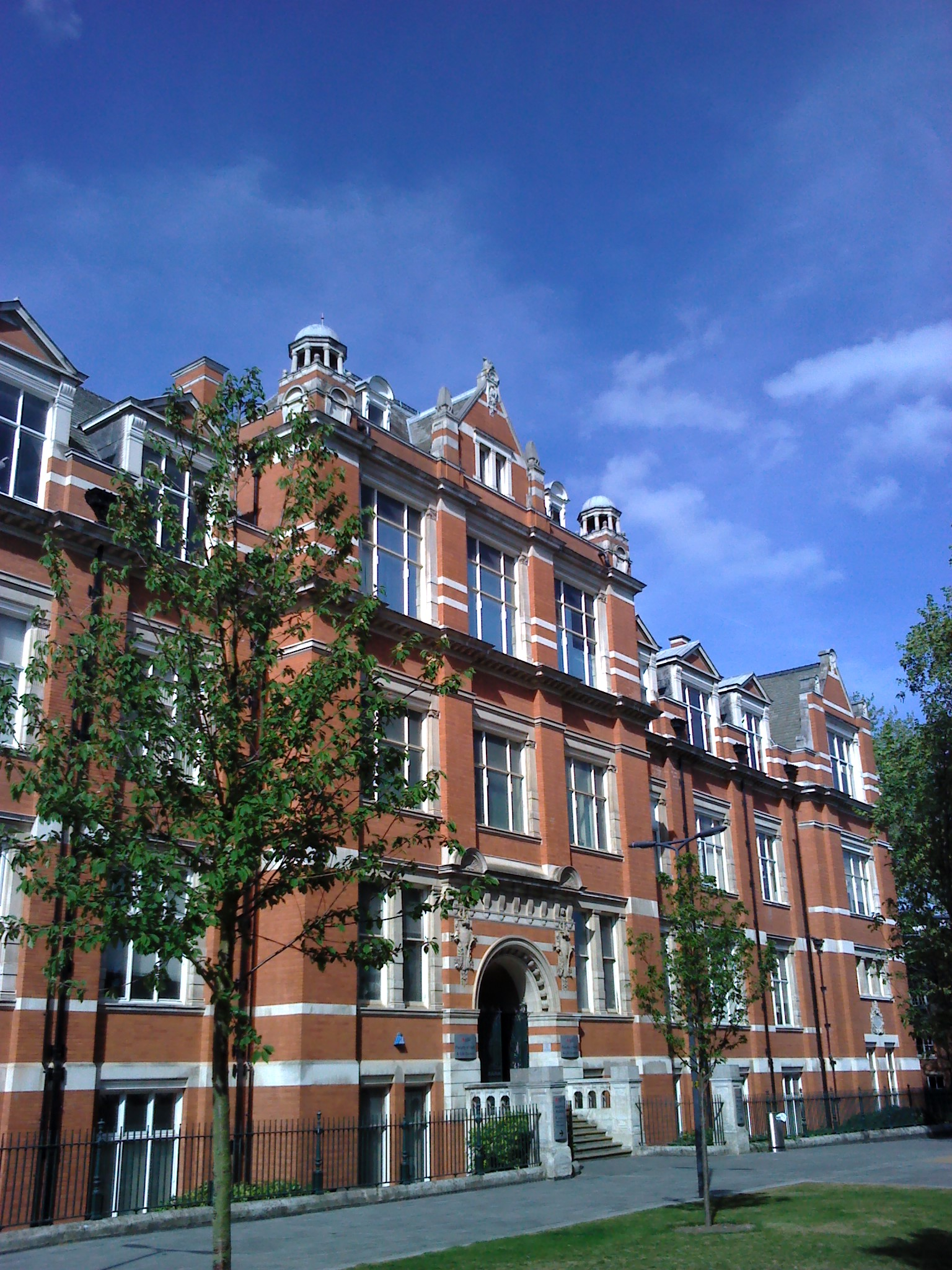
The Hawthorn Building, home to the Faculty of Health and Life Sciences

The Leicester Business School was regarded by The Sunday Times as one of the top 10 business schools in the UK, whilst the 2007 National Student Survey ranked it seventh out of 110 institutions for student satisfaction.

It comprises more than 4000 students and 150 academic staff, making it one of the larger providers of business and management education in the UK.

The Faculty of Business and Law is based in the Hugh Aston Building, a £35 million investment opened in March 2010. The construction of the building released the 14th-century Magazine Gateway from four lanes of traffic, allowing a tree-lined square to be created: Magazine Square.

The building's namesake, Hugh Aston, died in November 1558 and was a leading figure of his generation, serving at different times as Coroner, Mayor, and Member of Parliament for the borough of Leicester, as well as being one of the foremost early Tudor composers.

=== Faculty of Health and Life Sciences ===
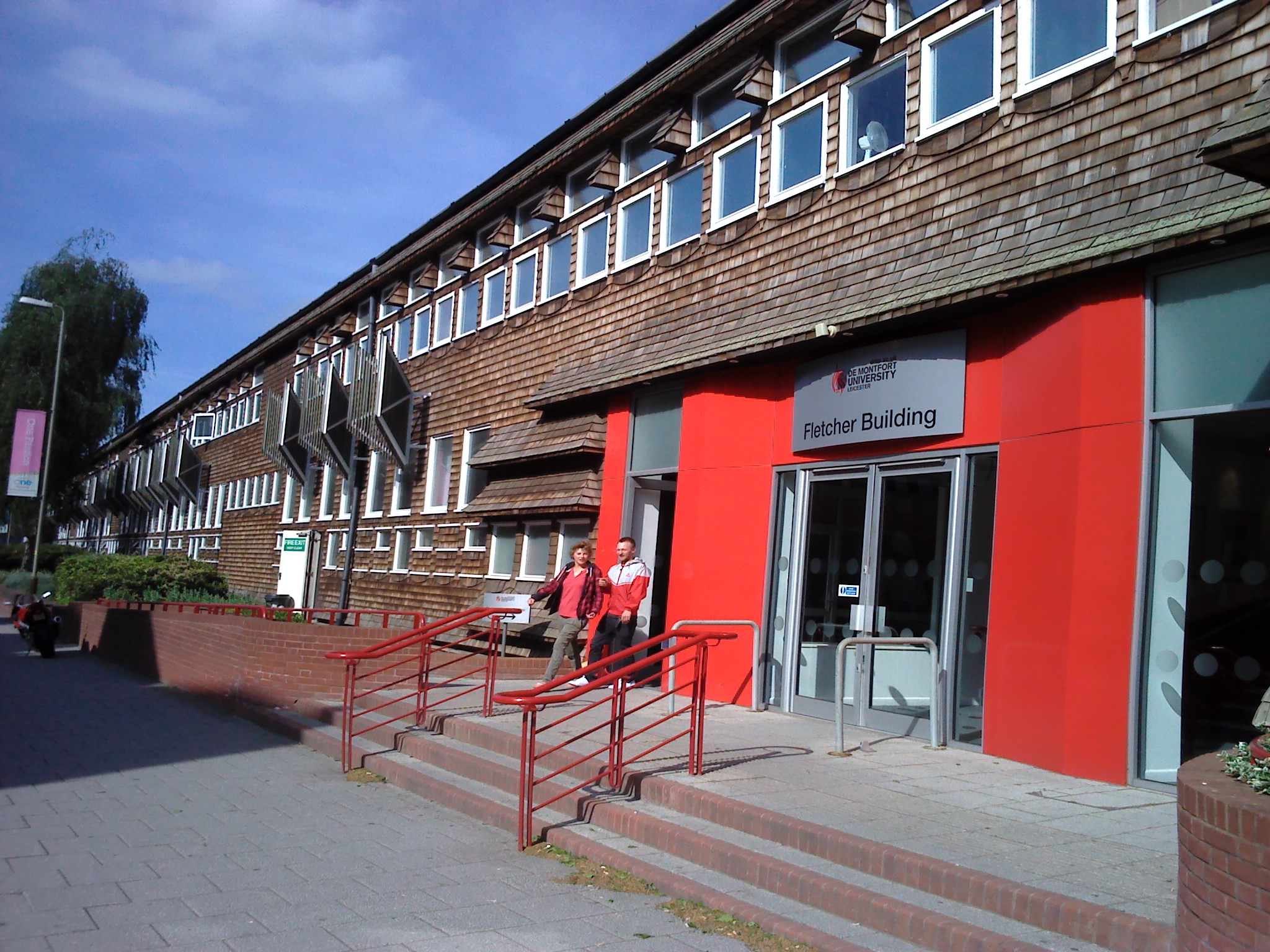
The Fletcher Building of the former Faculty of Art and Design

The Faculty of Health and Life Sciences is De Montfort's largest faculty, housing roughly 500 full-time and part-time staff and approximately 8000 students. It comprises four interconnected schools: the Leicester School of Allied Health Sciences, the School of Applied Social Sciences, the Leicester School of Nursing and Midwifery, and the Leicester School of Pharmacy.

The Faculty is based in the Hawthorn Building, formerly an Arts College, which boasts an Art Deco turnstile and stage area that now functions as a lecture theatre. David Bowie and Jimi Hendrix reportedly played at the venue in the 1960s. Ancient archways are visible on the lower ground floor, supposedly remnants of a monastery that occupied the site before the building's construction.

The four schools interrelate to allow collaboration across subject boundaries in teaching, consultancy, and research. Between them, the Schools cover not just laboratory sciences but Child, Adolescent and Family Therapy; Community Studies; Community and Criminal Justice; Policing Practice; Criminal Investigation with Policing; Counselling and Psychotherapy; Applied Criminology; Applied Criminology with Psychology; Biomedical Science; Medical Science; Criminology and Criminal Justice; Forensic Science; Health and Wellbeing in Society; Midwifery; Nursing (Adult, Child, Mental Health, Learning Disability); Paramedic Science; Pharmaceutical Sciences; Pharmacy; Psychology; Psychology with Criminology; Psychology with Education Studies; Social Work; and Speech and Language Therapy.

=== Governance ===
The university is governed primarily by its 17-person Board of Governors, chaired by Ian Squires since January 2020.

== Academic profile ==
=== Reputation and rankings ===
Rankings
National rankings
- Complete (2027): 111
- Guardian (2027): 85
- Times / Sunday Times (2027): 87

Global rankings
- QS (2027): 851–900
- THE (2026): 601–800

The Department for Education awarded the university an overall Silver rating in the 2023 Teaching Excellence Framework. The 2014 Research Excellence Framework described roughly 60% of the University's research activities as "world-leading" or "internationally excellent".

Further, the University was ranked 94th in the UK for the Guardian rankings of 2018, 70th by The Complete University Guide for 2019, and 67th by The Times/Sunday Times higher education ranking.

In 2019, the first-ever Times Higher Education (THE) University Impact Rankings, a global performance table that assesses universities against the United Nations' Sustainable Development Goals, ranked De Montfort University 50th in the world.

=== Affiliations and partnerships ===
The university has special arrangements with more than 80 universities and colleges in over 25 countries, including Nanjing University situated in Jiangsu, eastern China. The two universities have launched various initiatives, including a scholarship programme for De Montfort students and doctoral study coupled with English language tuition for students from Nanjing. De Montfort's Institute of Creative Technologies will also advise Nanjing University on a digital recreation of medieval China, following the institute's success in developing a virtual rendition of Leicester during its Roman occupation.

== Student life ==
=== Rugby ===
In March 1985, the rugby league team won the British Polytechnics Cup Final 17-9 in Dewsbury. David Nunn (Land Management 1987) played for the British Polytechnics rugby union team. Paul Burnell later played for England at age 23 in February 1989. Aadel Kardooni and Ian Hunter (rugby union) played for England Students RFC in 1990.

== Notable people ==
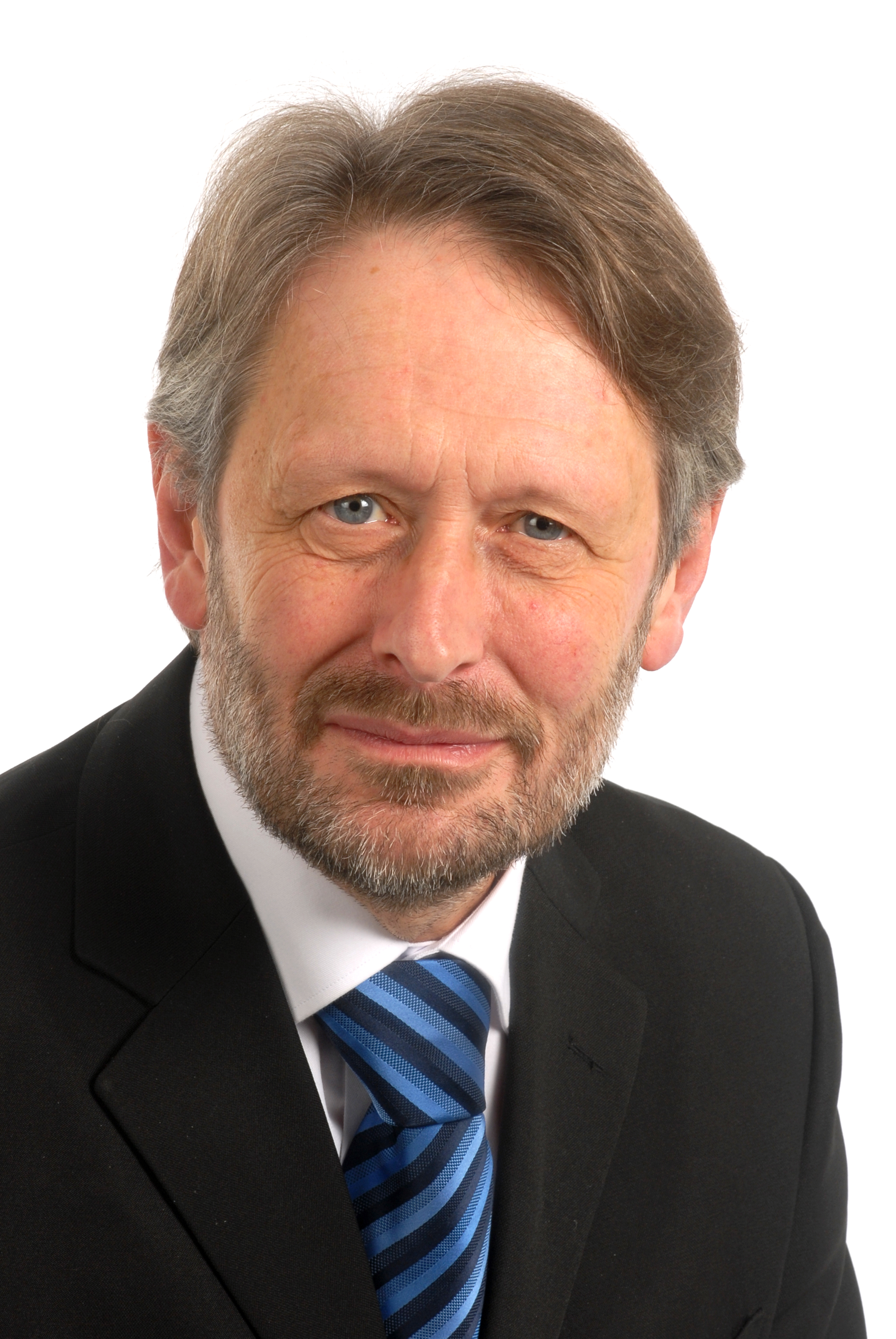
Sir Peter Soulsby, politician and Mayor of Leicester

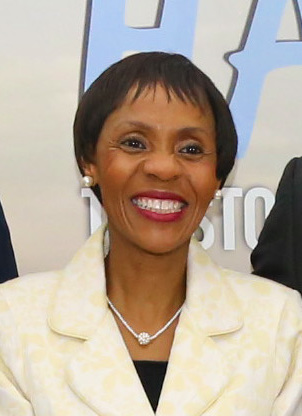
Neo Masisi, First Lady of Botswana

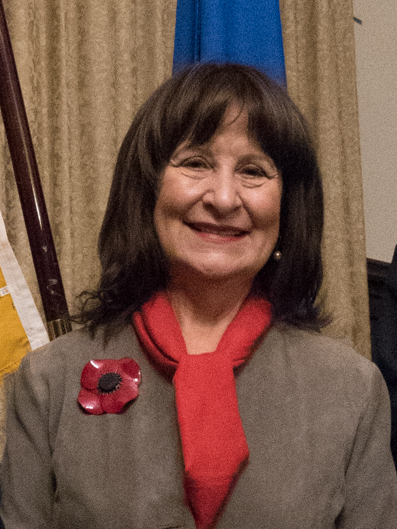
Helena Kennedy, Baroness Kennedy of The Shaws, politician

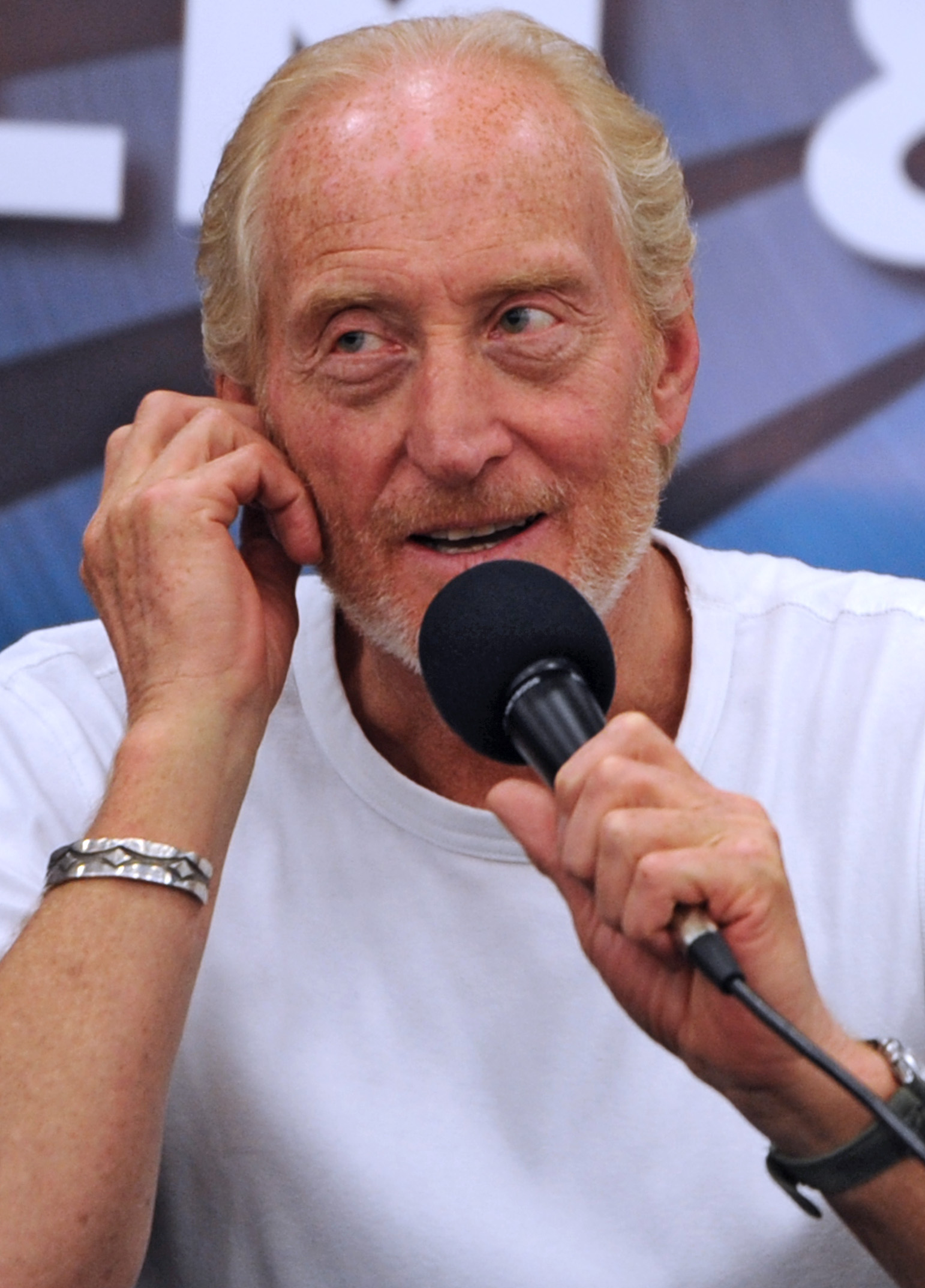
Charles Dance, actor

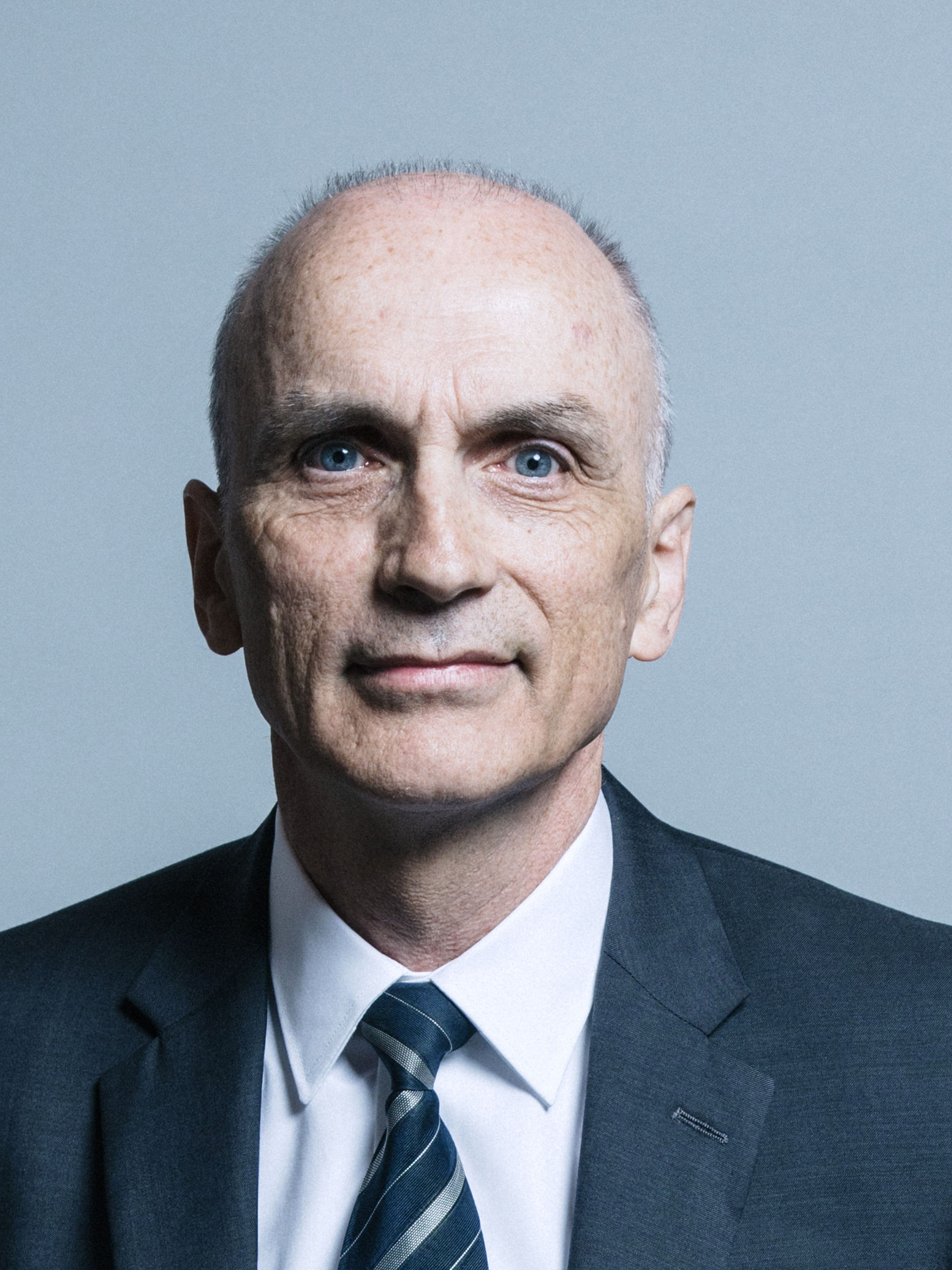
Chris Williamson, politician

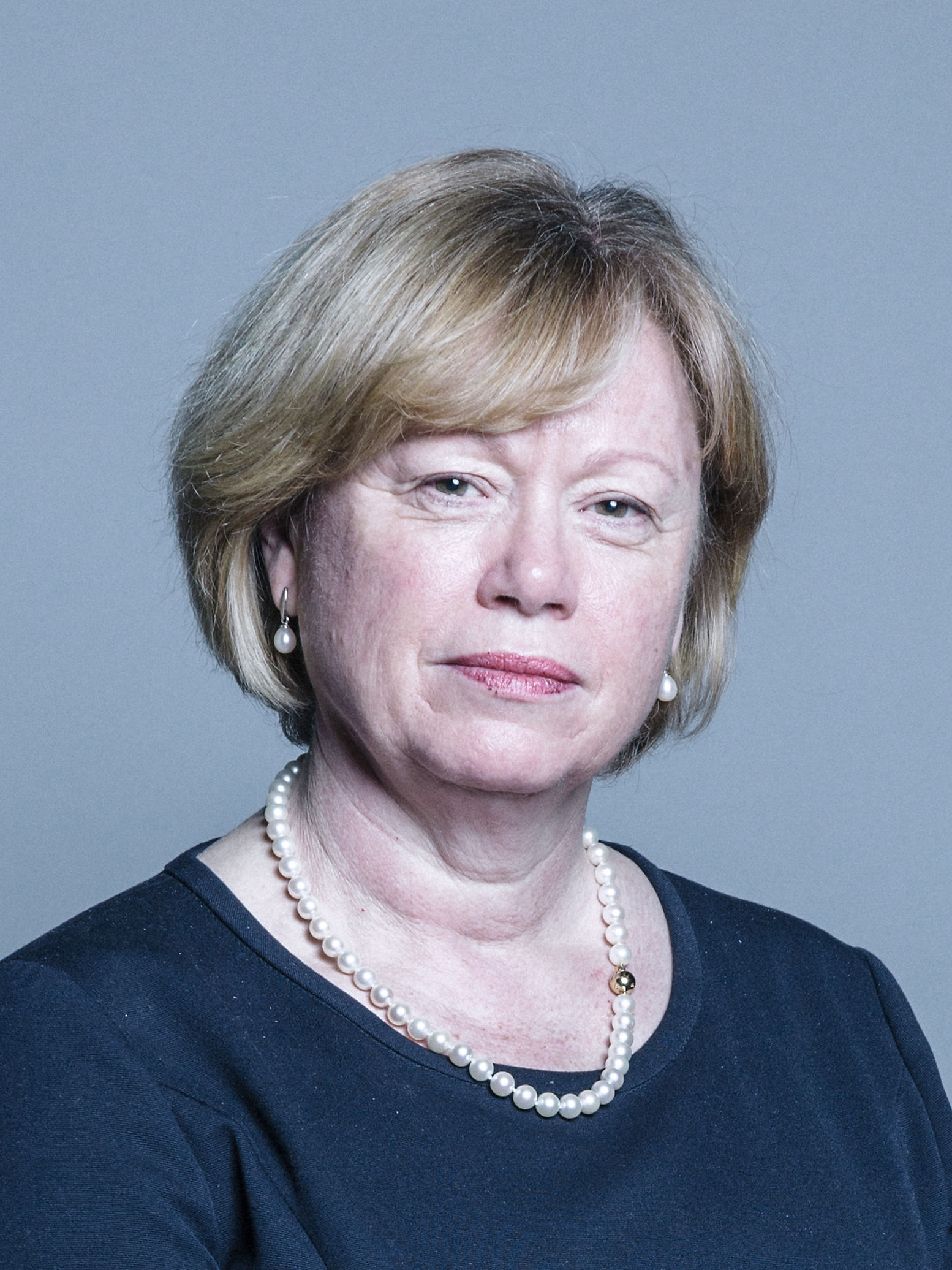
Angela Smith, Baroness Smith of Basildon, politician

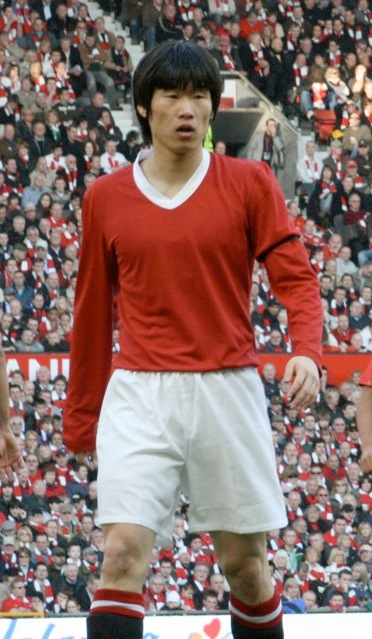
Park Ji-sung, former professional footballer

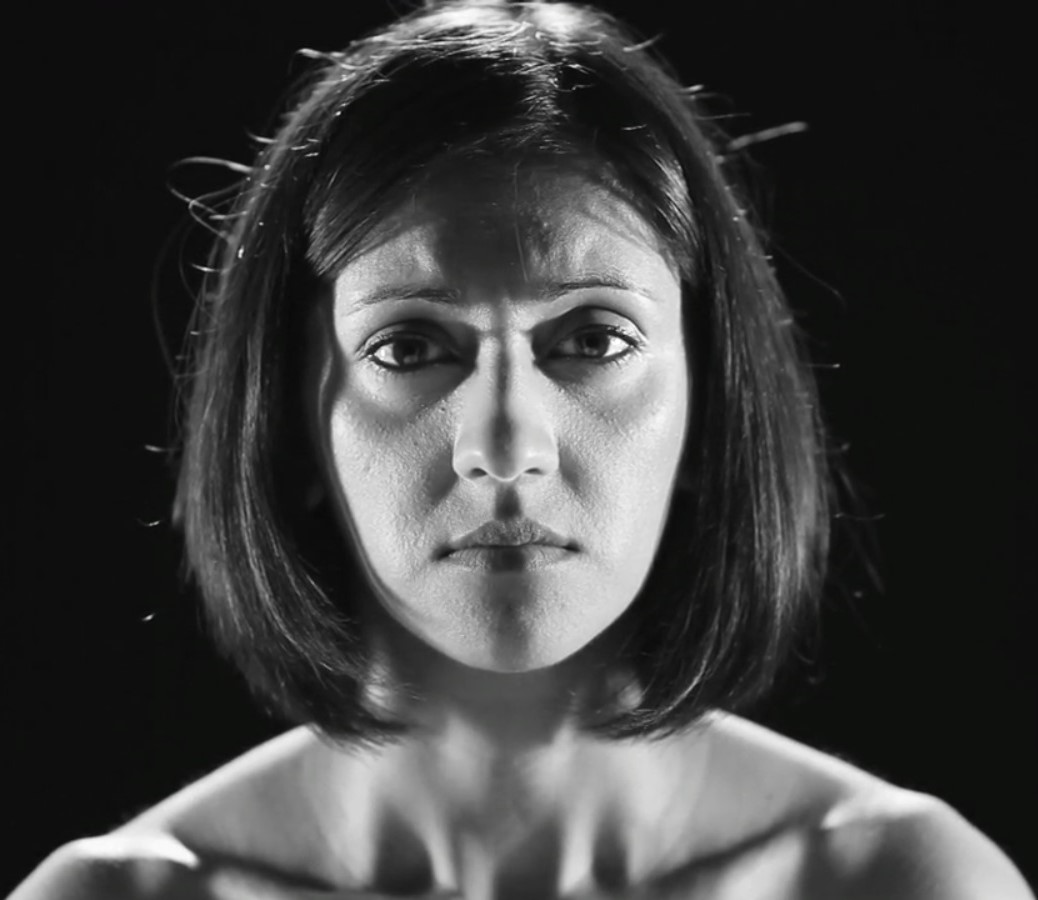
Manjinder Virk, actress

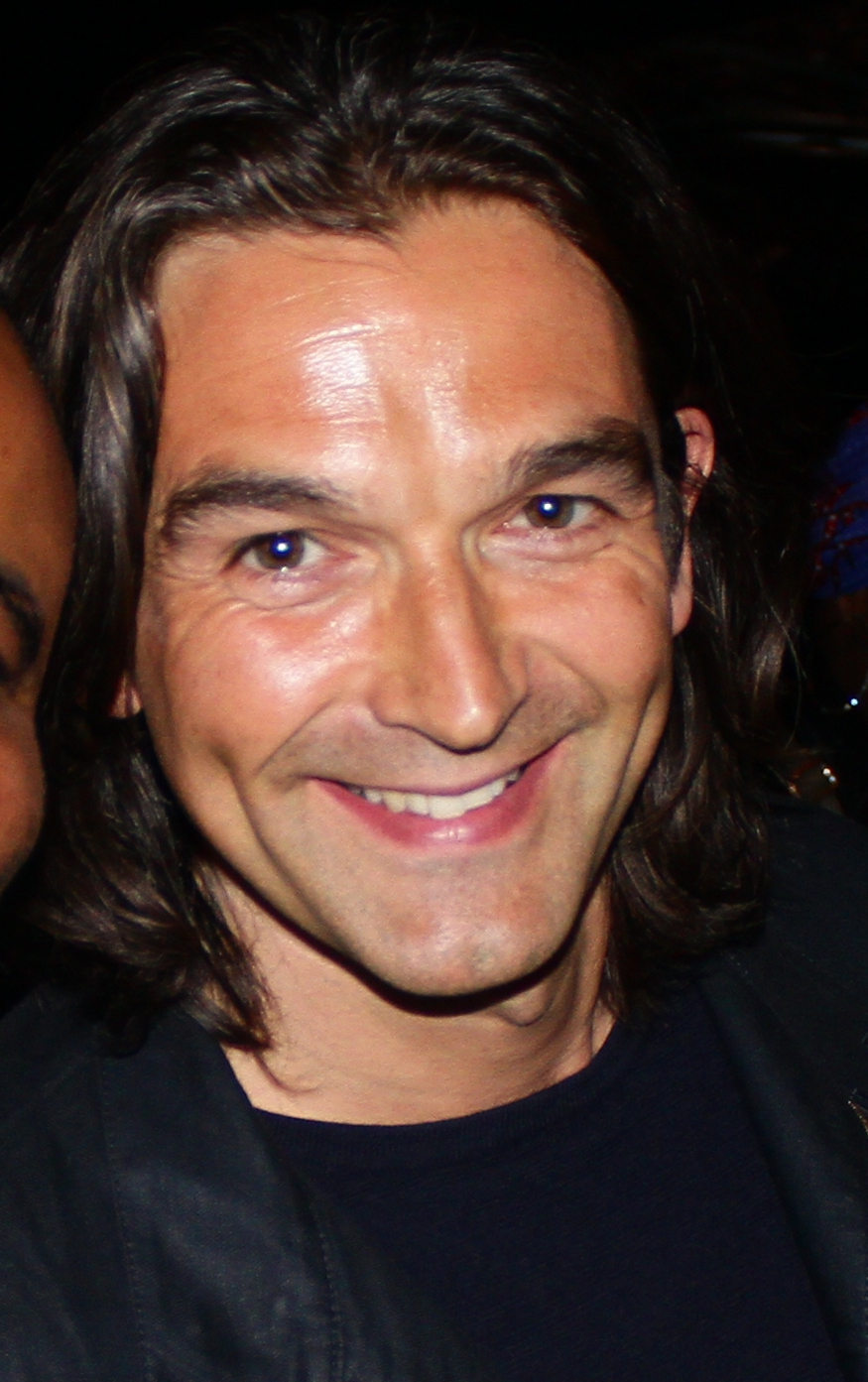
Justin Chadwick, actor

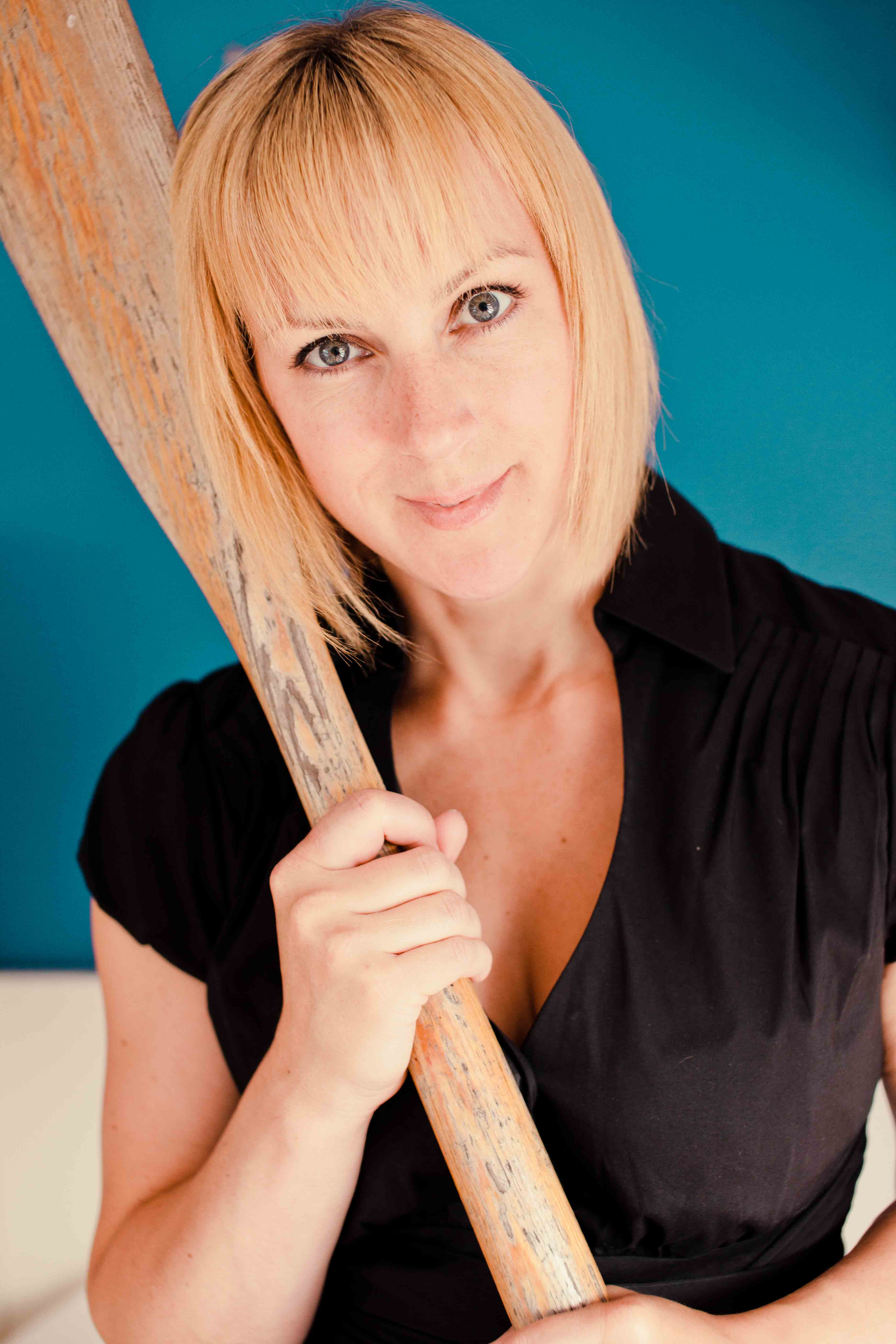
Debra Searle, adventurer

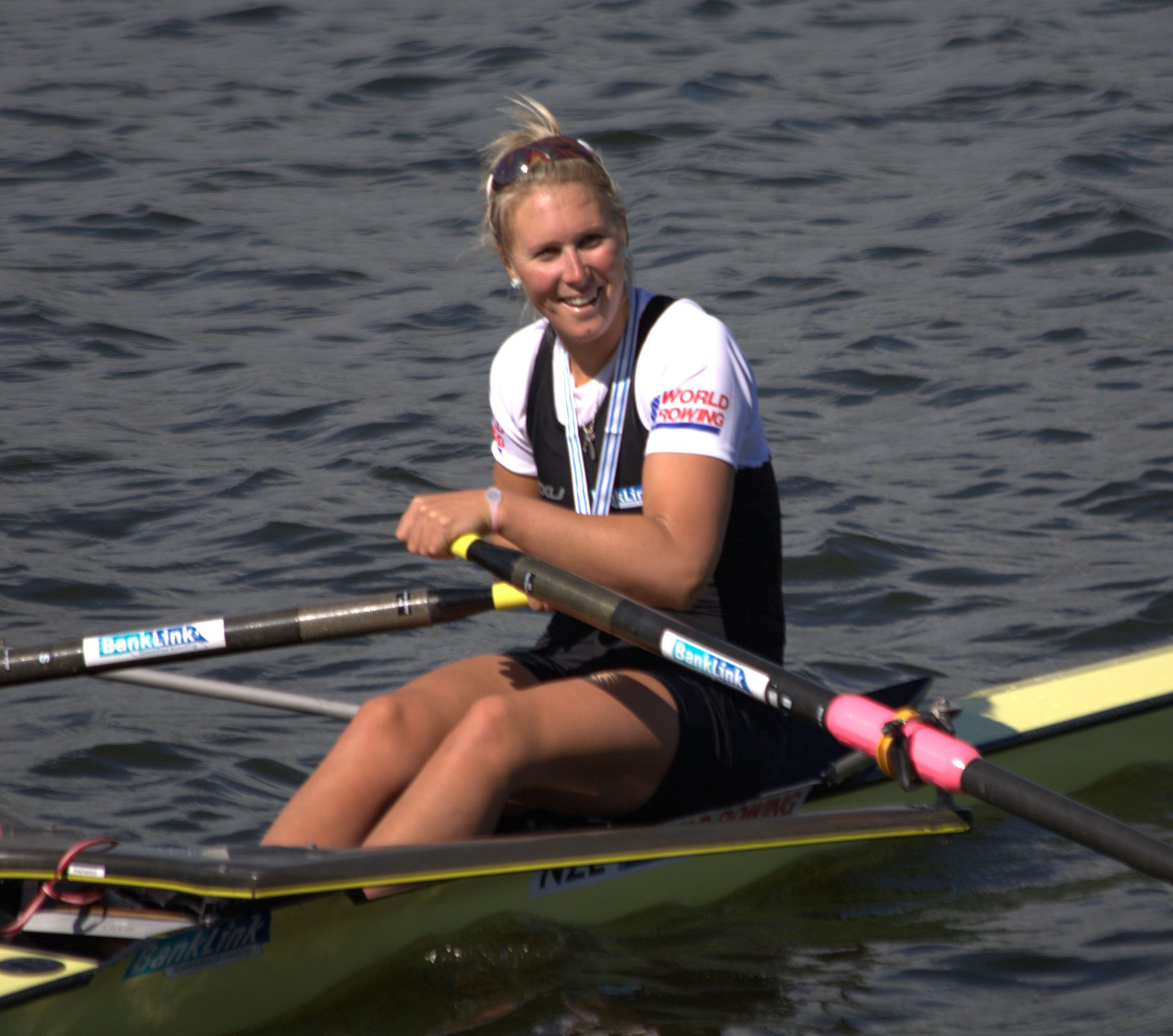
Emma Twigg, Olympic rower

== See also ==
- Armorial of UK universities
- List of universities in the UK
- Post-1992 universities
