= Leicester Castle =

Grade I listed archaeological site in Leicester, United Kingdom

- Leicestershire
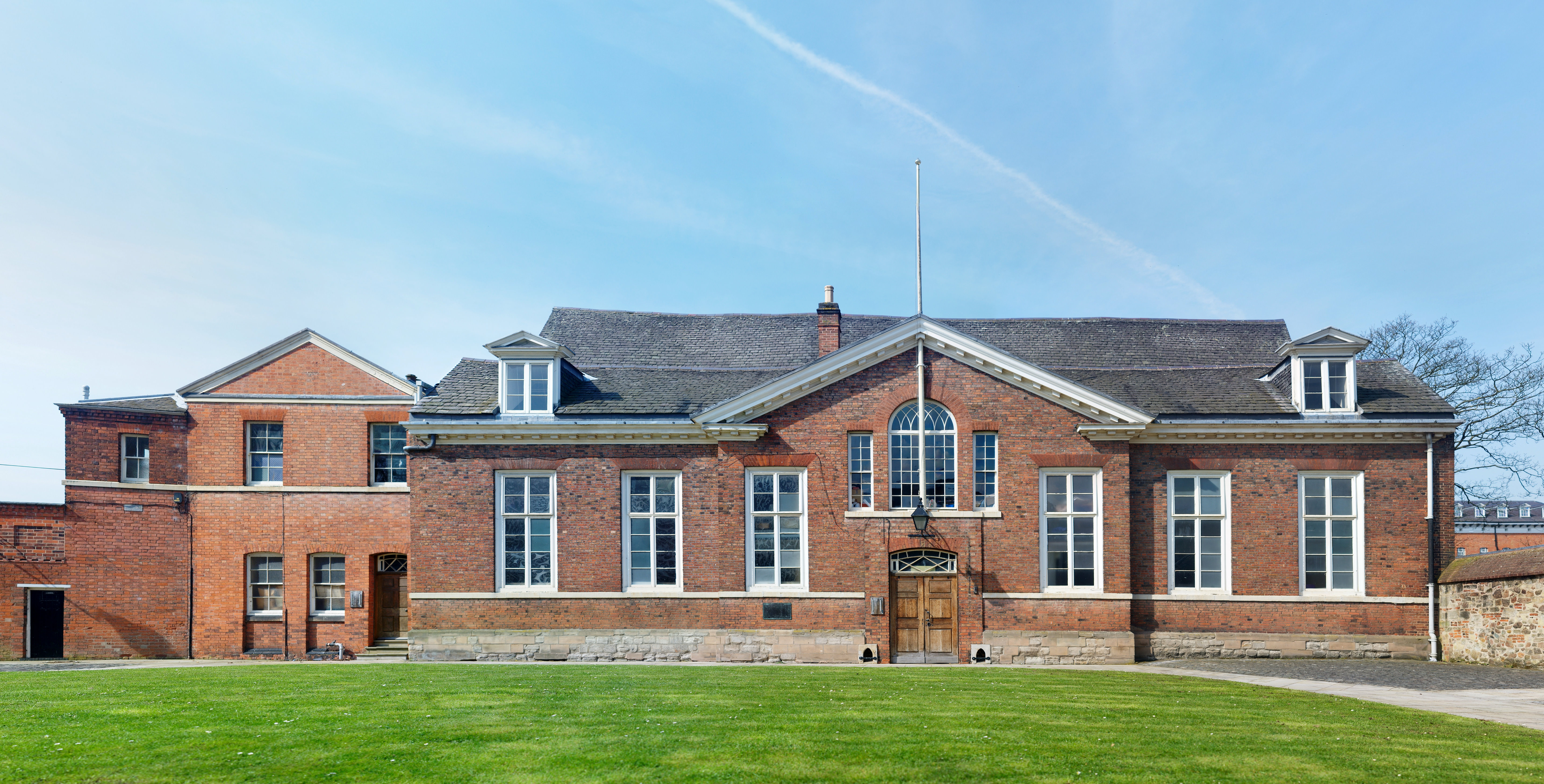
- The Great Hall

Site information
- Type: Norman
- Open to the public: everyday

Location
- Shown within Leicestershire
- Coordinates: 52°37′56.4″N 1°8′28.3″W

Site history
- Built: 11th century
- Built by: William the Conqueror
- In use: Law court

Scheduled monument
- Official name: Leicester Castle and the Magazine Gateway
- Designated: 26 June 1924
- Reference no.: 1012147

Map of central Leicester showing Leicester Castle's place (shown in green) among the key sites of Leicester old town. The Roman and medieval walls are marked by the dotted line. The churches are marked in red, the monasteries in black, secular buildings in blue, and the one surviving Roman ruin in purple.

Leicester Castle is in the city of the same name in the English county of Leicestershire. The complex is situated in the west of Leicester City Centre, between Saint Nicholas Circle to the north and De Montfort University to the south. A large motte, the Great Hall, the Church of St Mary de Castro, and the ruined Turret Gateway are the substantial remains of what was once a large set of defensive and residential structures. It was historically the seat of the Earls of Leicester, from 1107-1175 under the House of Beaumont, from 1239 to 1265 under the House of Montfort, and after 1267 with the House of Lancaster when the Earldoms of Leicester and Lancaster were combined. The Castle's Great Hall served for centuries as the home of Leicester County Assizes and is encased in a Queen Anne style frontage. The Castle is a scheduled monument.

== History ==
Leicester Castle was part of the medieval town defences, built over the Roman walls in the south western corner of the town on the eastern bank of the River Soar. The castle was probably built around 1070 (soon after the Norman Conquest in 1066) under the governorship of Hugh de Grandmesnil. The remains of the earliest wave of construction now consist of a mound and various ruins in the bailey. Originally the mound was 40 ft (12.2 m) high.

In 1107 Robert de Beaumont Count of Meulan was made Earl of Leicester, the first of that title, and granted possession of the castle and the old Roman town by King Henry I. He undertook significant building works in the bailey and established a college of priests to serve a chantry in the castle chapel and the pastoral needs of his household.

In 1173, Henry II's three eldest sons led a rebellion against him with support from several magnates, including Robert de Beaumont, 3rd Earl of Leicester. During the conflict, Henry's forces laid siege to Leicester and burnt most of the town. The castle was then slighted (partially demolished) and parts of the ditches filled. According to historian Sidney Painter, it was one of at least 21 castles demolished on Henry II's instructions.

Kings sometimes stayed at the castle (Edward I in 1300, and Edward II in 1310 and 1311), and John of Gaunt and his second wife Constance of Castile both died here in 1399 and 1394 respectively. Henry of Grosmont, 1st Duke of Lancaster, one of the leading captains in the early phases of the Hundred Years' War died at the castle on 23 March 1361.

It became an official royal residence during the reigns of Henry IV, Henry V, Henry VI, and Edward IV, but by the middle of the 15th century, it was no longer considered suitable and was used mainly as a courthouse; with sessions being held in the Great Hall. Apart from being used for assize courts, the Great Hall was also used for sessions of the Parliament of England most notably the Parliament of Bats in 1426, when the conditions in London were not suitable.

A section of the castle wall, adjacent to the Turret Gateway, has gun loops (holes) that were poked through the medieval wall to use as firing ports by the garrison when Parliamentarian Leicester was besieged, captured, and ransacked, during the English Civil War by the main Royalist Field army under Charles I and Prince Rupert on 31 May 1645. The third storey of the Turret Gateway (known as 'Prince Rupert's gateway') was destroyed in an election riot in 1832.

In the 1880s, J. M. Barrie visited the assize courts regularly and spent many hours inside as reporter for the Nottingham Journal when the hall was being used as a court house. The castle continued to be used as the venue for assizes and quarter sessions and, after 1972, for hearings of Leicester Crown Court until the Leicester Law Courts in Wellington Street were completed in 1981.

== Gallery ==
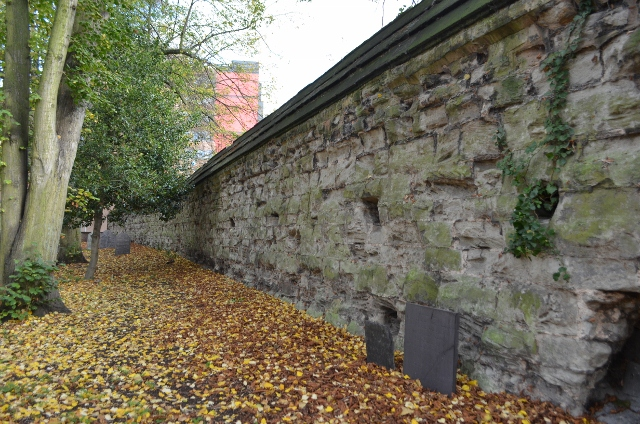
A view of the castle wall in St Mary de Castro churchyard

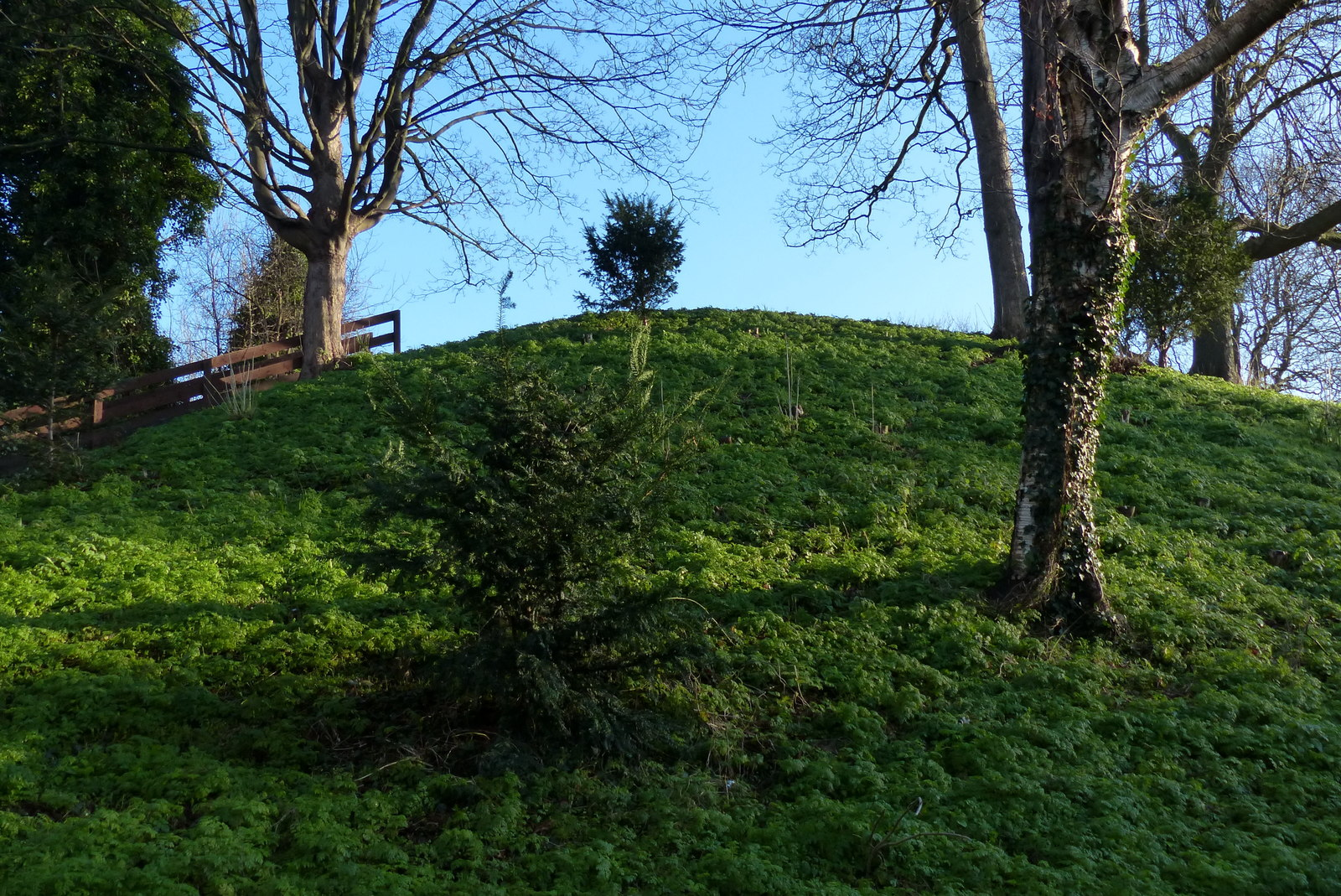
The castle motte

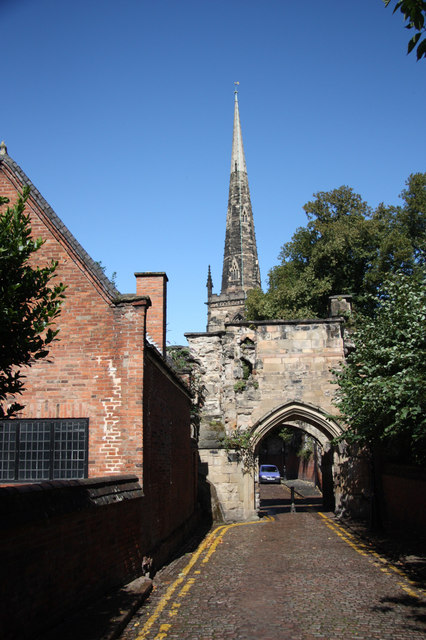
The Turret Gateway and former spire of St Mary de Castro

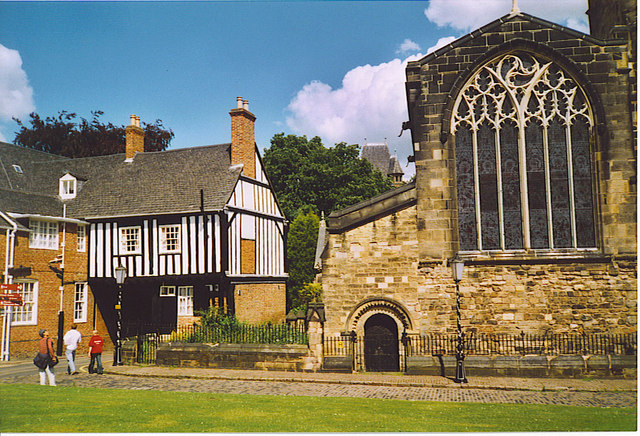
The Castle Yard

== See also ==
- Castles in Great Britain and Ireland
- Church of St Mary de Castro, Leicester
- Grade I listed buildings in Leicester
- List of castles in England
- Jewry Wall Museum
- Leicester Guildhall
- Newarke Houses Museum
