= Leicester Guildhall =

Municipal building in Leicester, Leicestershire, England

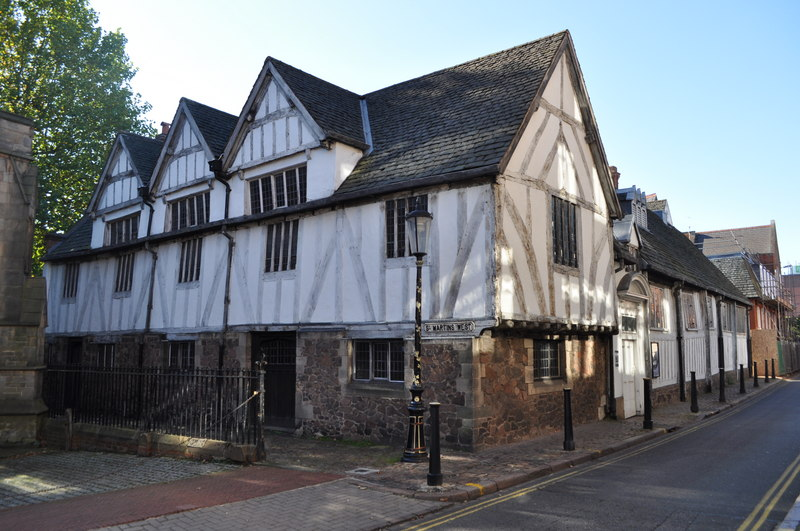

- Location within Leicester
- 52°38′4.9″N 1°8′15.7″W
- Location: Leicester, Leicestershire

History
- Built: 1390; 636 years ago

Site notes
- Architectural style: Medieval style
- Governing body: Leicester City Council

Listed Building – Grade I
- Designated: 5 January 1950
- Reference no.: 1361405

The Guildhall in Leicester, England, is a timber framed building, with the earliest part dating from c. 1390. The Guildhall acted as the town hall for the city until the current one was commissioned in 1876. It is located in the old walled city, on a street now known as Guildhall Lane. It was used first as the meeting place for Leicester's Guild of Corpus Christi and then later for the more formal Corporation of Leicester. The hall was used for many purposes, including council meetings, feasts, as a courtroom, and for theatrical performances; the ultimatum given to the city during English Civil War was discussed here. It is a Grade I listed building, and the surrounding area, also including the Cathedral of St Martin's, is a conservation area, one of three in Leicester.

== History ==
Map of central Leicester showing the Guildhall's place (marked in green) among the key sites of Leicester Old Town. The Roman and medieval walls are marked by the dotted line. The churches are marked in red; the religious houses dissolved during the Reformation in black; secular sites in blue; and the one surviving Roman ruin in purple.

The Great Hall was built around 1390 as the meeting place of the Guild of Corpus Christi. The Guild was an association of merchants and gentry established in 1350 to protect trade in the town and for a variety ritual purposes. It was dedicated to the Eucharist, the bread and wine of Holy Communion believed by Catholic Christians to hold the divine presence of Christ's Body (or Corpus Christi in Latin). The Guildhall was used for banquets, festivals, and as the lodging of a priest who prayed for the souls of deceased Guild members in a chantry chapel in nearby St Martin's Church. The Corporation of Leicester was created in 1589 and came to use the Guildhall as its meeting place and administrative centre.

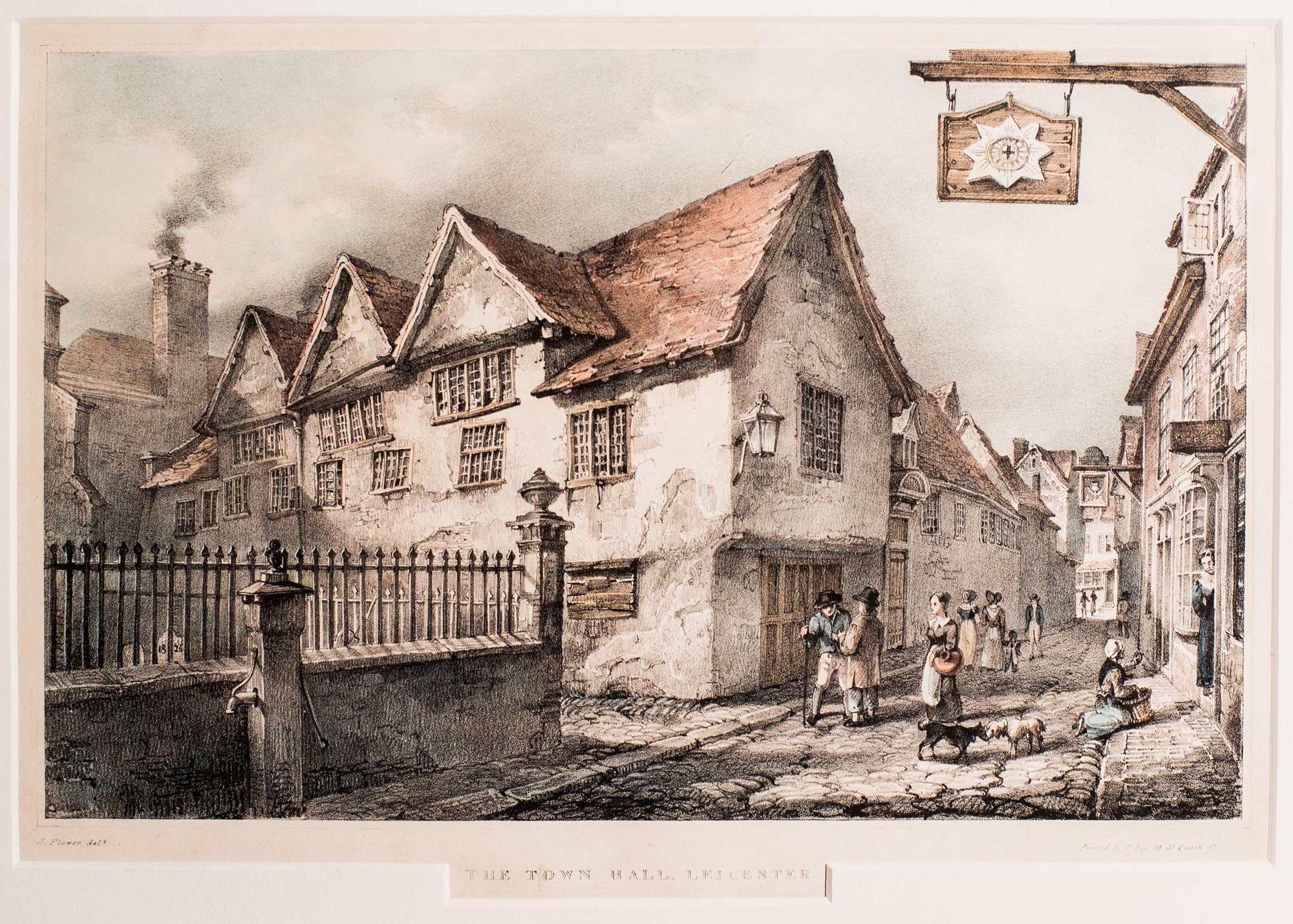
The Guildhall in an 1826 lithograph based on a painting by the Leicester artist, John Flower.

It is reputed that William Shakespeare appeared here in the late 16th century. In recognition of this, the television company, Maya Vision, brought the Royal Shakespeare Company to perform at the Guildhall as part of its 2003 series for the BBC, In Search of Shakespeare, written and narrated by the historian, Michael Wood. Part of the Shakespeare legend is that Shakespeare first came across the tale of King Leir whilst appearing at the Guildhall and this inspired him to write his own play King Lear. There is, however, no actual evidence to support this, although the legend of King Leir is associated with Leicester.

During the English Civil War the Mayor and corporation received a demand from Prince Rupert for £2,000. The decision was made at the Guildhall to offer a loan of £500 and made an appeal to King Charles I. In May 1645 the King in attempt to divert attention away from Oxford positioned an army of 6,000 men outside the city walls on 29 May 1645. Again important decisions regarding the fate of the city were to be decided in the Guildhall. On 30 May 1645 the Royalist Army made demand after demand to the city, who played for time. In the end Prince Rupert attacked at 3:00 pm. The City walls were breached, and the last stand made by the defenders outside the Guildhall and St Martins. The Royalists then entered the Guildhall looting the town's archives, and mace and seal. The Royalist victory was reversed a couple of weeks later with the defeat at Naseby.

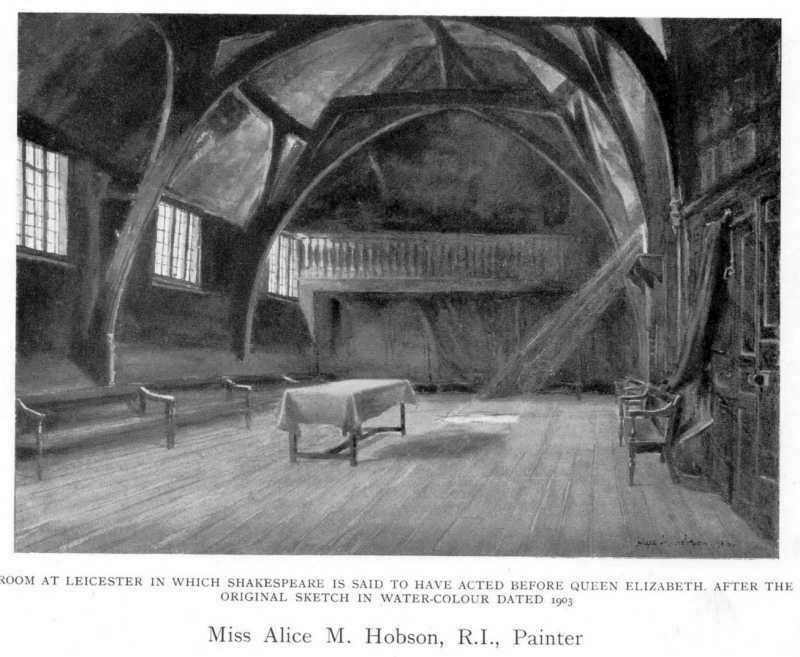
Room at Leicester in which Shakespeare is said to have Acted before Queen Elizabeth by Alice Mary Hobson

Records also show that entertainment expenses were paid for such items as wine, beer for Oliver Cromwell. Although this does not prove he stayed at the Guildhall, it is highly probable that he visited several times. The coat of arms of King Charles I can be seen today inside the Mayor's Parlour.

The Guildhall library in England, which includes the New Testament in Greek from the 15th century, was established in 1632, when the town library was moved into the east wing of the building. Leicester's first police force had its station in the Guildhall from 1836.

The Corporation moved to the new Leicester Town Hall in 1876. Apart from the police station, it was later used as a school. However, the building was becoming increasingly dilapidated, and by the 1920s there were plans to demolish it. After the intervention of the Leicestershire Archaeological and Historical Society, the council began restoration work on the building, finishing it in 1926, when the Guildhall was opened as a museum.

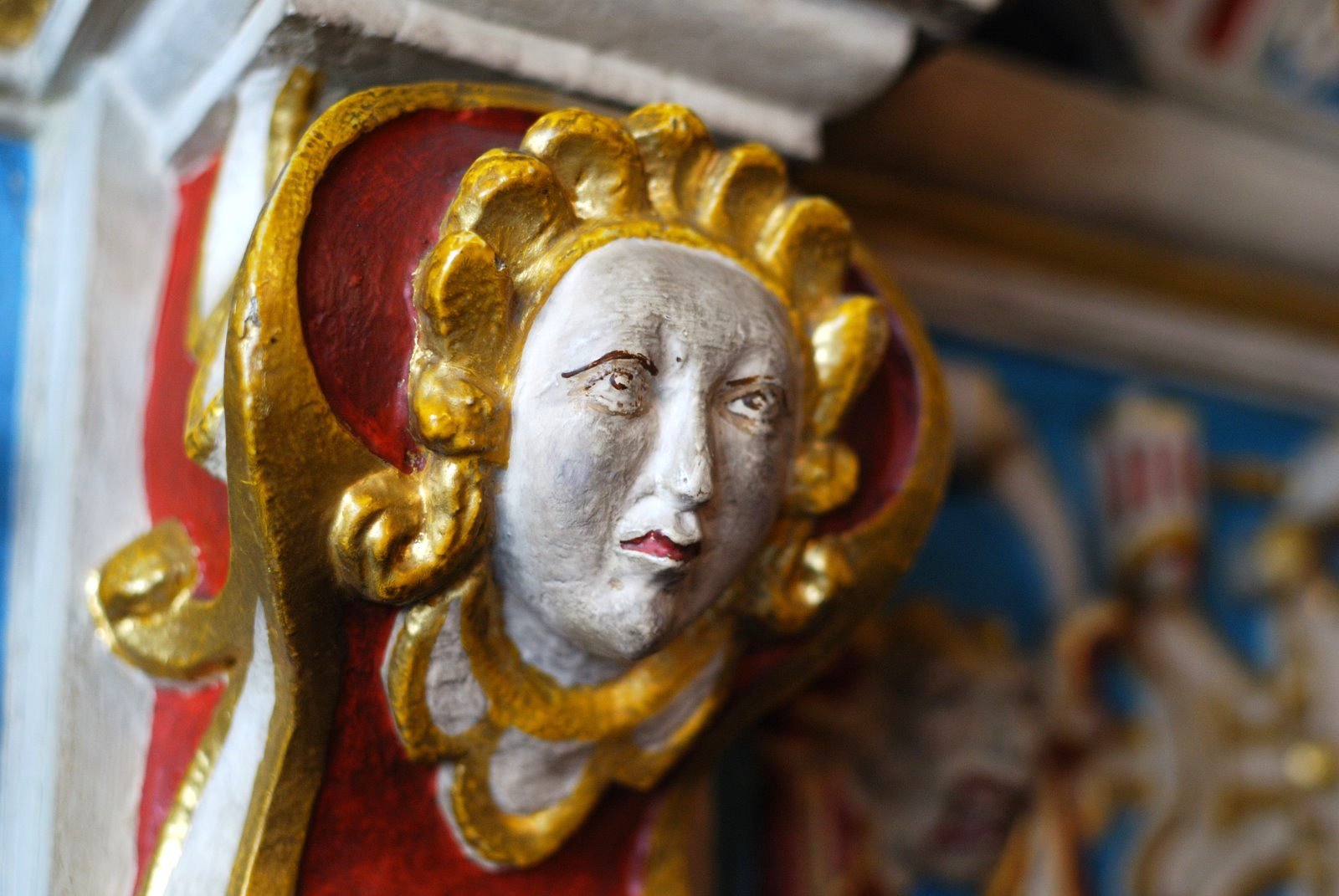
An angel on the ornate wooden fireplace inside the Mayor's Parlour

At a press conference in the Guildhall on 4 February 2013, it was confirmed that archaeologists had discovered Richard III's remain in the nearby Greyfriars 'Car Park'. The former Alderman Newton's Greencoat School building, close to the grave site, opened as a permanent Richard III museum, on 24 July 2014.

== Present day ==
The Guildhall is used as a performance venue as well as a museum.

== Ghosts ==
With five reported ghosts, the Guildhall is reputedly Leicester's most haunted building. Because of its reported hauntings, it has appeared on various TV programmes, including being investigated on the television show Most Haunted.

== See also ==
- Guild
- Guildhall
