= Bickerstaff =

Bickerstaff or Bickerstaffe is a surname. Notable people with the surname include:

- Bernie Bickerstaff (born 1944), American National Basketball Association executive and former head coach, father of J. B. Bickerstaff
- Edwin Bickerstaff (1920–2008), neurologist after whom Bickerstaff's encephalitis and Bickerstaff's migraine are named
- Elaine Bickerstaff (born 1948), birth name of Elaine Paige, English singer and actress
- Erik Bickerstaff (born 1980), American former National Football League running back
- Isaac Bickerstaff, a pseudonym used by Jonathan Swift as part of a hoax to predict the death of astrologer John Partridge
- Isaac Bickerstaffe (1733–after 1808), Anglo-Irish playwright
- J. B. Bickerstaff (born 1979), American National Basketball Association head coach, son of Bernie Bickerstaff
- John Bickerstaffe (1848–1930), English philanthropist
- Matt Bickerstaff (born 1976), Australian rugby league player
- Philip Bickerstaffe (1639–1714), English merchant and Member of Parliament
- Rodney Bickerstaffe (1945–2017), British trade unionist, General Secretary of the National Union of Public Employees and UNISON
- Steve Bickerstaff (1946–2019), adjunct professor of law at the University of Texas Law School in Austin, Texas
- Tim Bickerstaff (1942–2009), New Zealand radio talkback host and pioneer
- William Bickerstaff (1728–1789), English antiquarian, curate, and schoolmaster

== See also ==
- Bickerstaffe, a village and civil parish in the West Lancashire district of Lancashire, England
