= Biggerstaff =

Biggerstaff is a surname. Notable people with the surname include:

- Knight Biggerstaff (1906–2001), American historian
- Sean Biggerstaff (born 1983), Scottish actor and musician

== See also ==
- Bickerstaff
