= Henry Bramley Ellis =

Henry Bramley Ellis FRCO (1841 – 1910) was an organist, composer, conductor and teacher based in Leicester.

== Life ==
He was born in Newark on Trent in 1841. His father, Edward Ellis, was verger at St. Mary Magadalene's Church, Newark on Trent, and he sang in the choir at the church.

He had organ lessons from the organist, Edward Dearle, and became his assistant.

He married Ellen Howard Brown in 1866. They had the following children:

- Harold Bramley Ellis (1869 - 1937)
- Ethelwyn Howard Ellis (1869 - 1948)
- Leonard Ellis (b. 1871)
- Gerald Haydn Ellis (1873 - 1967)
- Cecil Henry Ellis (1874 1963)
- Sydney Ellis (b. 1877)

He was Music Master at Wyggeston Girls’ School.

Whilst in Leicester he conducted the Leicester Amateur Vocal Society from 1879, which became the Leicester Philharmonic Society in 1886. He maintained this position until his death in 1910.

He was also an organ teacher, and his pupil Benjamin Burrows succeeded him at St Mary de Castro, Leicester on the death of Ellis in 1910.

== Appointments ==
- Assistant Organist at St. Mary Magadalene's Church, Newark on Trent until 1864
- Organist at St Andrew's Church, Halstead, Essex 1864 - 1874
- Organist at St John's Church, Albion Street, Leicester 1874 - 1878
- Organist at St Mary de Castro, Leicester 1878 - 1910

== Works ==
- The Fairies, polka for Piano 1869
- The Tournament. Galop for Piano 1873
- O were my love yon lilac fair. Song. 1879
- To a Redbreast. Son. 1880
- Jubilee March 1887
