= Church of St Mary de Castro, Leicester =

Medieval collegiate and parish church in Leicester Castle, England

St Mary de Castro, Leicester
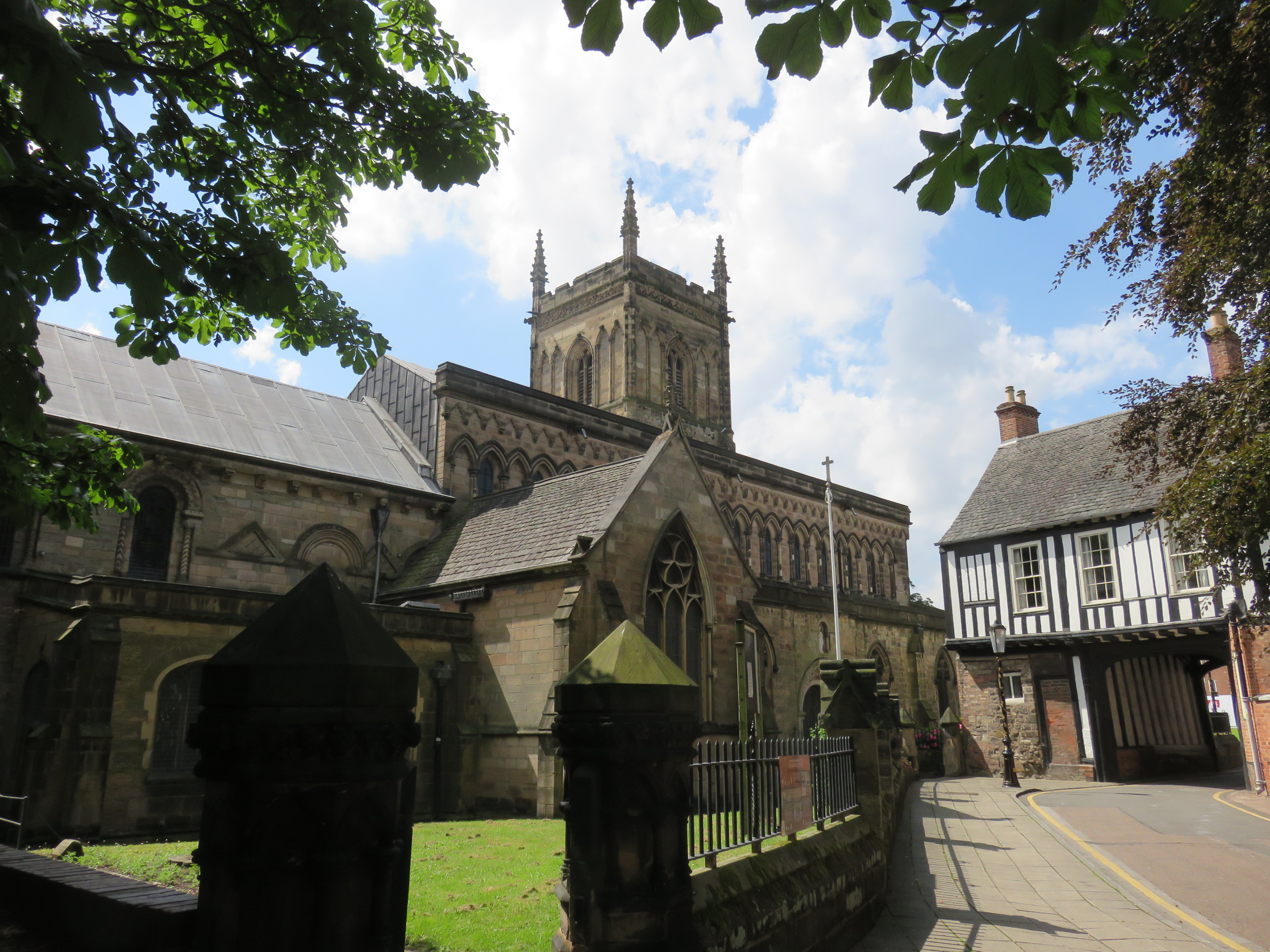
- North facade from Castle View showing Norman chancel and Gothic north nave, north aisle and St Anne's Chapel
- St Mary de Castro, Leicester
- 52.6323°N 1.1404°W
- OS grid reference: SK 58285 04188
- Location: Leicester Castle
- Country: England
- Denomination: Church of England
- Previous denomination: Roman Catholic
- Churchmanship: Anglo-Catholic

History
- Dedication: St Mary de Castro "St Mary of the Castle"

Administration
- Province: Canterbury
- Diocese: Leicester
- Archdeaconry: Leicester
- Parish: St Mary de Castro

Clergy
- Bishop: Rt Revd Norman Banks SSC (AEO)
- Vicar: Interregnum

Listed Building – Grade I
- Designated: 1950
- Reference no.: 1074070

Map of central Leicester showing the location of the Collegiate Parish Church of St Mary de Castro (marked in green) among the key historic sites of Leicester Old Town. The other four medieval churches are marked in boldly with red pin spots. The Roman and medieval walls are marked by the dotted line. The one surviving Roman ruin is in purple, secular sites are in blue, and dissolved religious houses in black.

St Mary de Castro is a medieval Grade I listed church in Leicester, England, located within the bailey of Leicester Castle. It is a Church of England parish church in the Diocese of Leicester. De Castro is Latin for 'of the Castle'; to differentiate it from the nearby St Mary de Pratis; 'St Mary of the Meadows'.

The building was closed to the public from 2011to 2015 after the spire was found to be unsafe and was dismantled. The tower has lacked a spire since then, as funds are insufficient to repair the tower and replace the spire.

== Architectural history ==
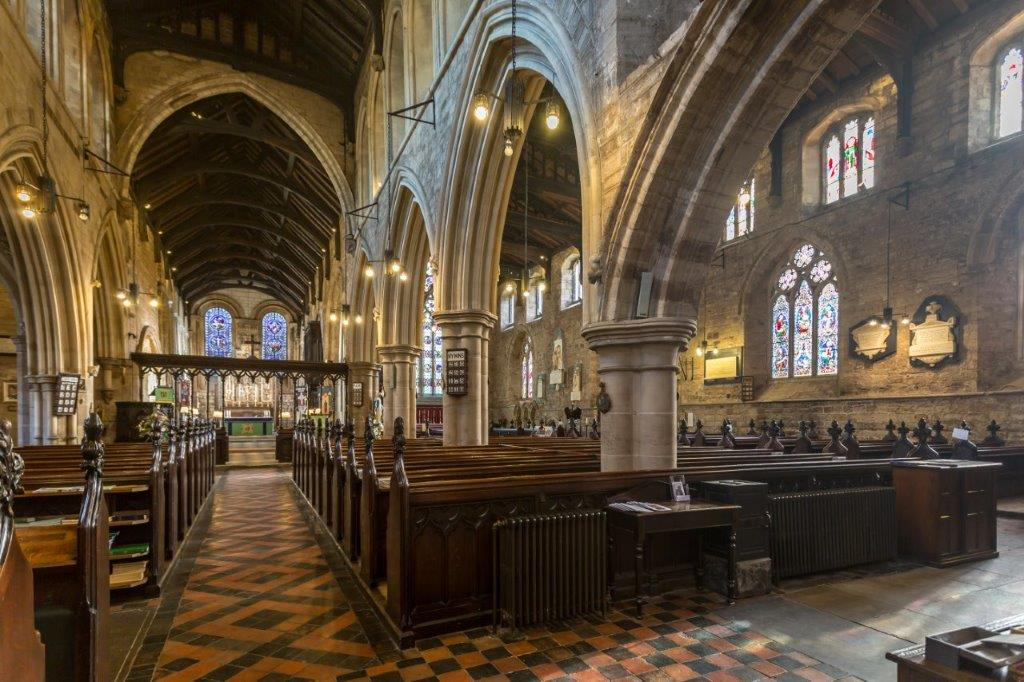
Interior view showing both naves

The foundation of the first church on the site dates to the year 918 and the reconquest of Danish-occupied Leicester by Anglo-Saxon forces under Ethelfleda, Lady of the Mercians, and Edward the Elder, both children of Alfred the Great. They were responsible for the reconstruction of the towns walls, the restoration of St Nicholas, and the first church on the site of Leicester Castle. It became a collegiate church by 1107 after Henry I of England granted the lands and castle to Robert de Beaumont, although the chronicler Henry Knighton implies that an Anglo-Saxon college of St Mary had already existed at the church before and that Robert merely refurbished it. Robert established it within the castle bailey as a college served by a dean and twelve canons in honour of the Virgin Mary and All Souls and as a chantry chapel for the souls of him, his family and the first three Norman kings. He endowed this and four other churches with £6 of his income and land in or near the city. However, in 1143 these endowments were all transferred by his son Robert de Beaumont, 2nd Earl of Leicester, to his own new Augustinian foundation of Leicester Abbey. The collegiate church retained, or had restored to it a dean, six clerks and a chaplain, along with Robert de Beaumont's grant of 20 shillings for lamps. It also retained parish offerings and most of the tithes. The collegiate nature of the church lasted until the college was disbanded in 1548 under the Chantry Act of Edward VI.

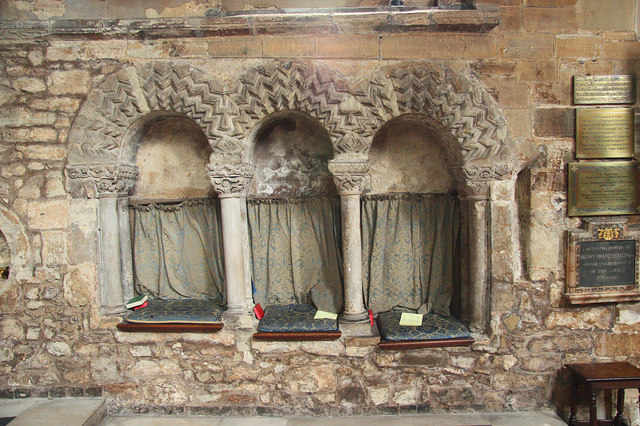
St Mary de Castro’s notable Norman sedilia

The early-12th-century church had no aisles, and various parts of these walls survive. It underwent a major expansion in the 1160, with a north aisle, doorways to north and west, and an extension to the chancel. The two doorways provide external Norman zigzag decoration, but it is the sedilia and piscina in the Chancel extension that Nikolaus Pevsner describes as "the finest piece of Norman decoration in the county". Thirteenth-century alterations culminated in a major reworking of transepts and south aisle, to create an aisle wider than the nave, providing much more space for local parishioners. The large geometrical traceried east window of the south aisle was created around 1300. The tower was built inside the south aisle, apparently as an afterthought, rising to a quatrefoil frieze, four decorated pinnacles, and the recessed parapet spire rising from behind the battlements. The spire was rebuilt in 1783, but retained its crockets and three tiers of lucarnes. The interior was heavily restored by George Gilbert Scott throughout the 1860s, at which time much of the stonework and furnishings were replaced.

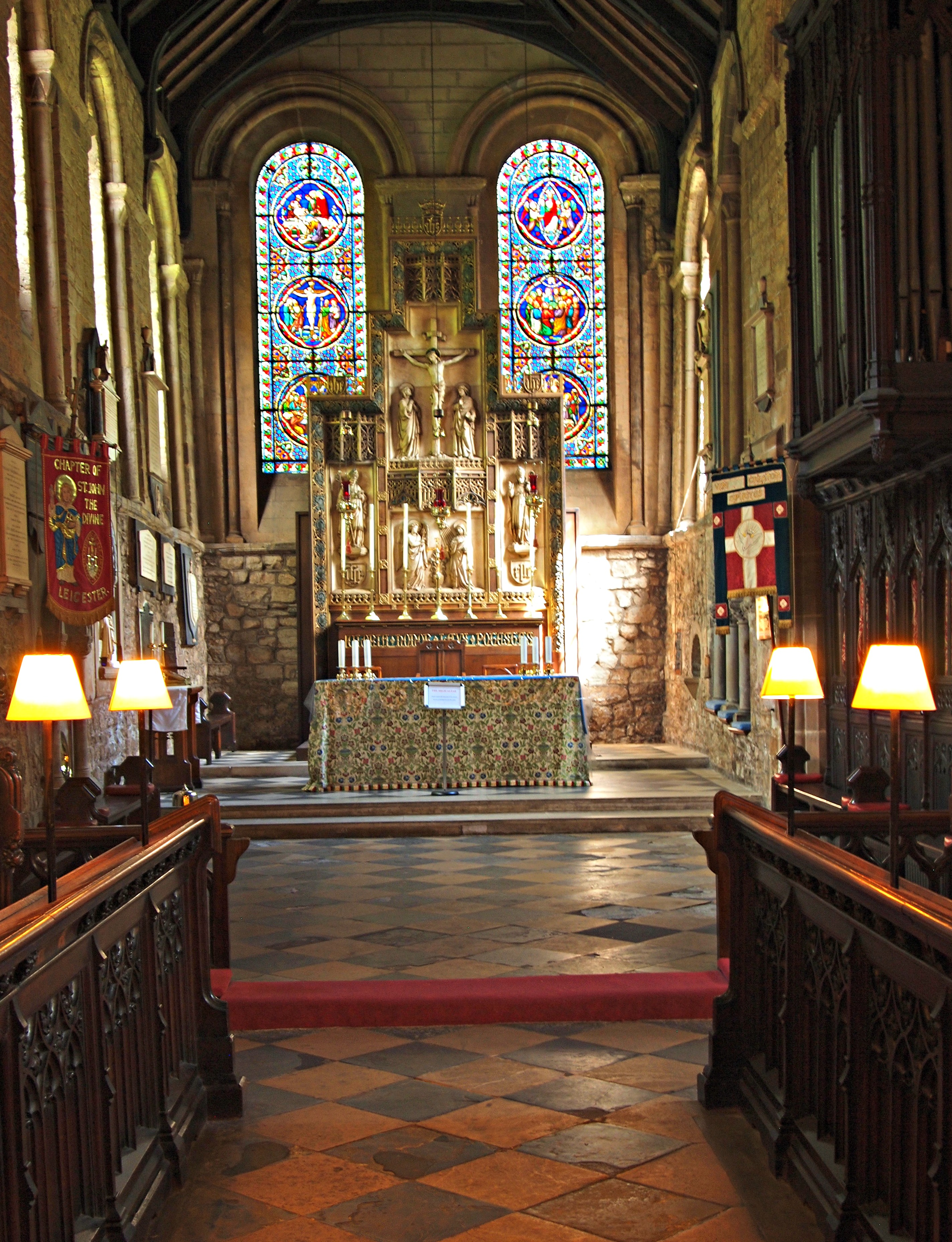
Chancel taken from the Choir showing reredos

== Notable events ==
It is rumoured that here, around 1366, Geoffrey Chaucer married Philippa (de) Roet (a lady-in-waiting to Edward III's queen, Philippa of Hainault, and a sister of Katherine Swynford who later (c. 1396) became the third wife of Chaucer's friend and patron, John of Gaunt).

The infant king Henry VI was knighted in the church at Whitsuntide 1426 by his uncle, John of Lancaster, Duke of Bedford, the Regent of France (whilst the Parliament of Bats was being held at the Castle). Henry then proceeded to himself dub a further 44 knights on the same occasion, the first of whom was Richard Plantagenet, 3rd Duke of York.

William Bickerstaffe, a charitable local schoolmaster and antiquarian, was baptised, buried and held a seven-year curacy at the church.

It is believed to have been the first church in the UK to be viewable online using Google Street View, having been photographed in August 2012.

== Spire ==
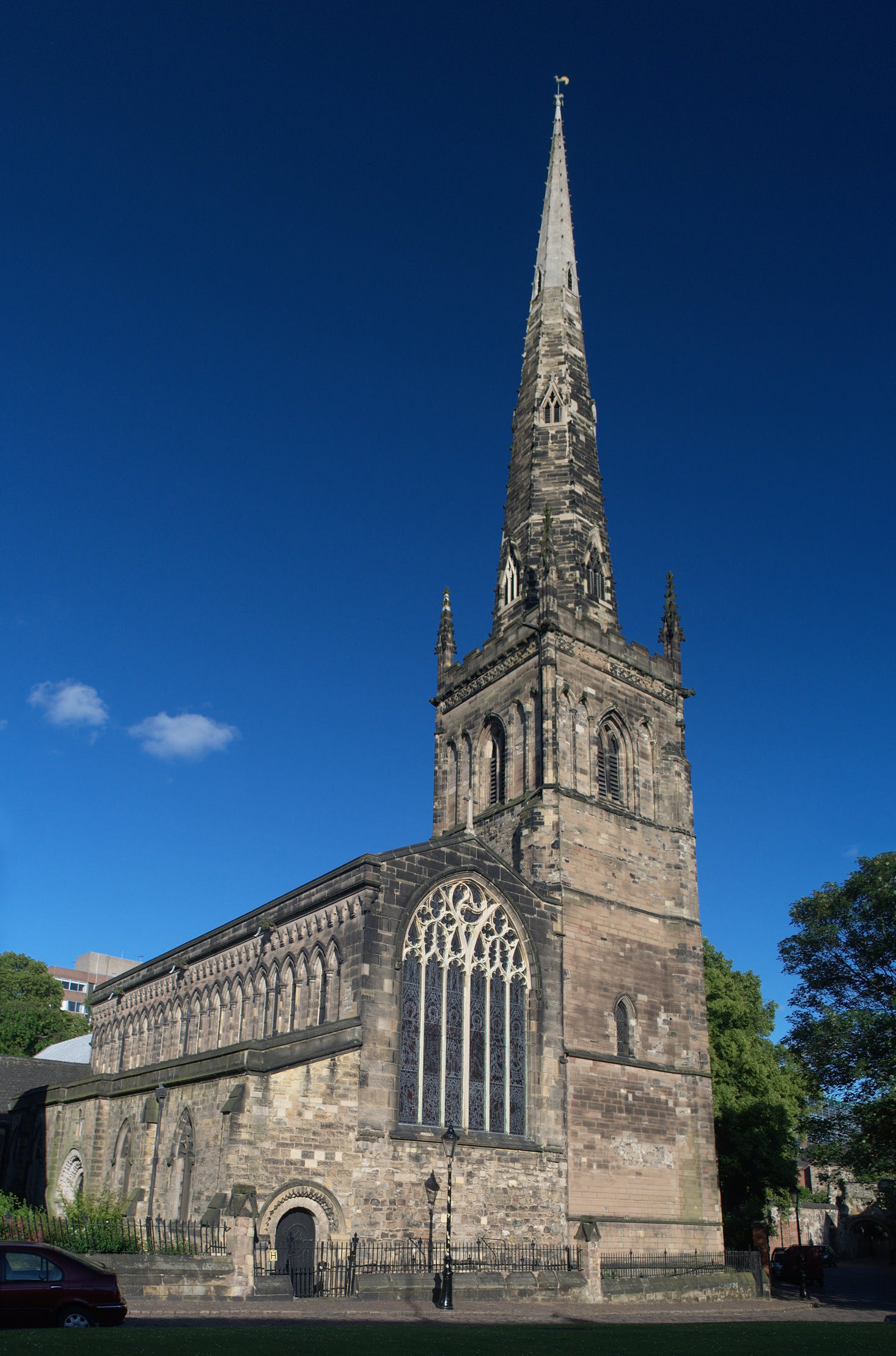
West front before the removal of the spire

The church was closed when the spire was found to be unsafe. The 14th-century octagonal spire, having been rebuilt in 1783, had developed six-metre-long cracks in four of its faces in September 2013. After inspections by structural engineers, it was deemed at risk of collapse. The severe condition of the spire meant it had to be demolished, at an estimated cost of £200,000, in 2014. Over £358,000 has been raised since 2011; however, there are currently insufficient funds to rebuild the spire and repair the tower.

== Organ ==
The church contains a three manual pipe organ which was originally installed in 1860 by Forster and Andrews. It has been the subject of modifications and restorations in 1880 by Joshua Porritt, and R. J. Winn in 1960. A specification of the organ can be found on the National Pipe Organ Register.

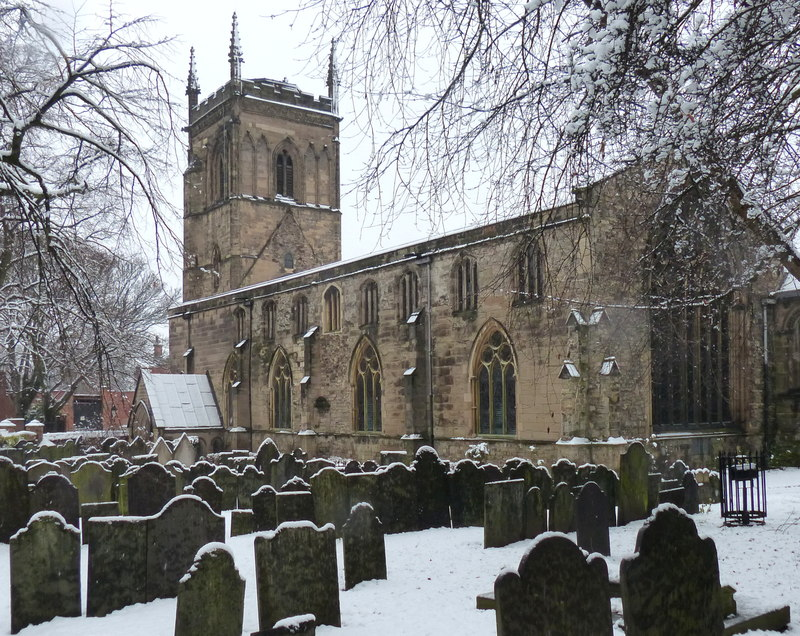
South Aisle and tower after spire removal

=== Organists ===
- Mary Ann Deacon
- Frederick Cambridge 1866 - 1868
- Andrew Landergan 1868 - ca. 1870
- Henry Bramley Ellis organist 1878 – 1910
- Benjamin Burrows 1910 - 1923
- William Edward Snow, father of C. P. Snow 1930 – 1953 (previously organist at St James’ Church, Aylestone, and All Saints’ Church, Wigston Magna)
- John M. Bence 1962 - 2020
- Andrew Green 2020 -

== Galleries ==
Norman stonework

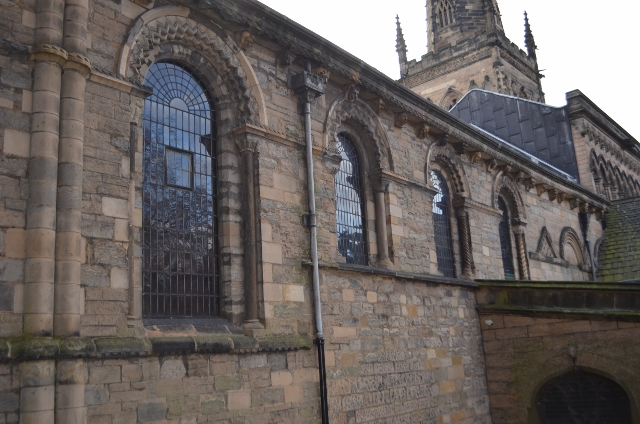
Norman chancel north façade (note grotesque corbels and arches)

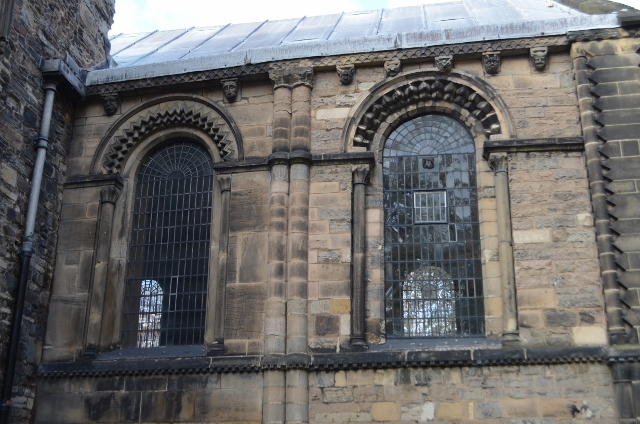
Norman chancel south façade (note grotesque corbels and arches)

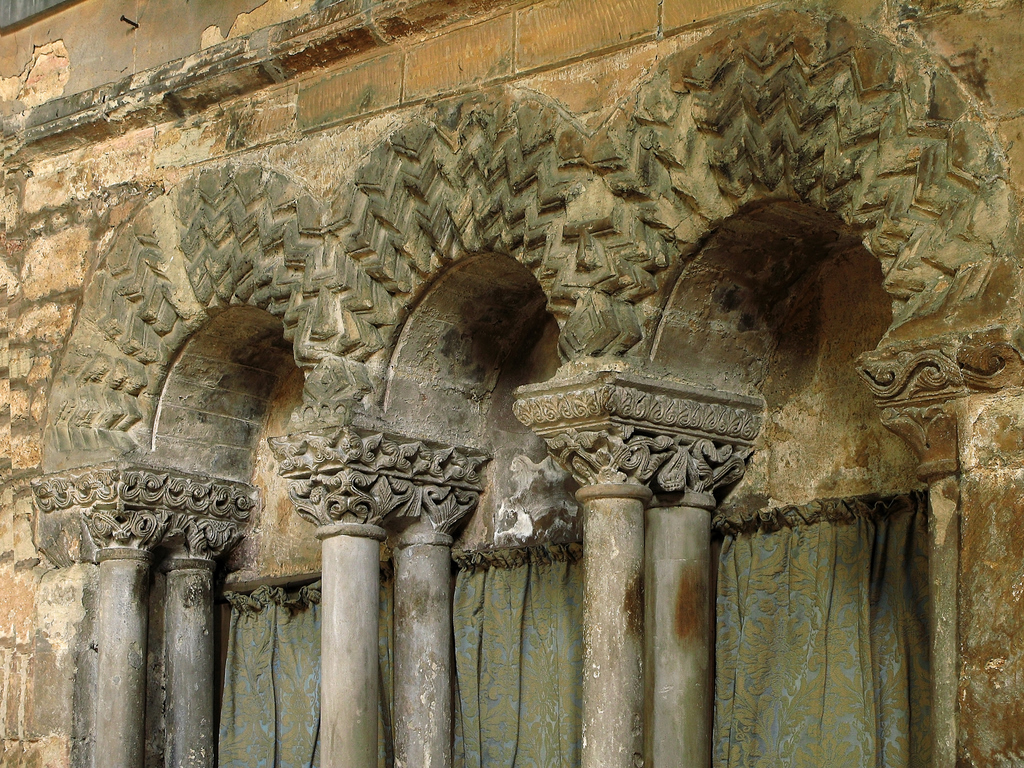
Chancel sedilia

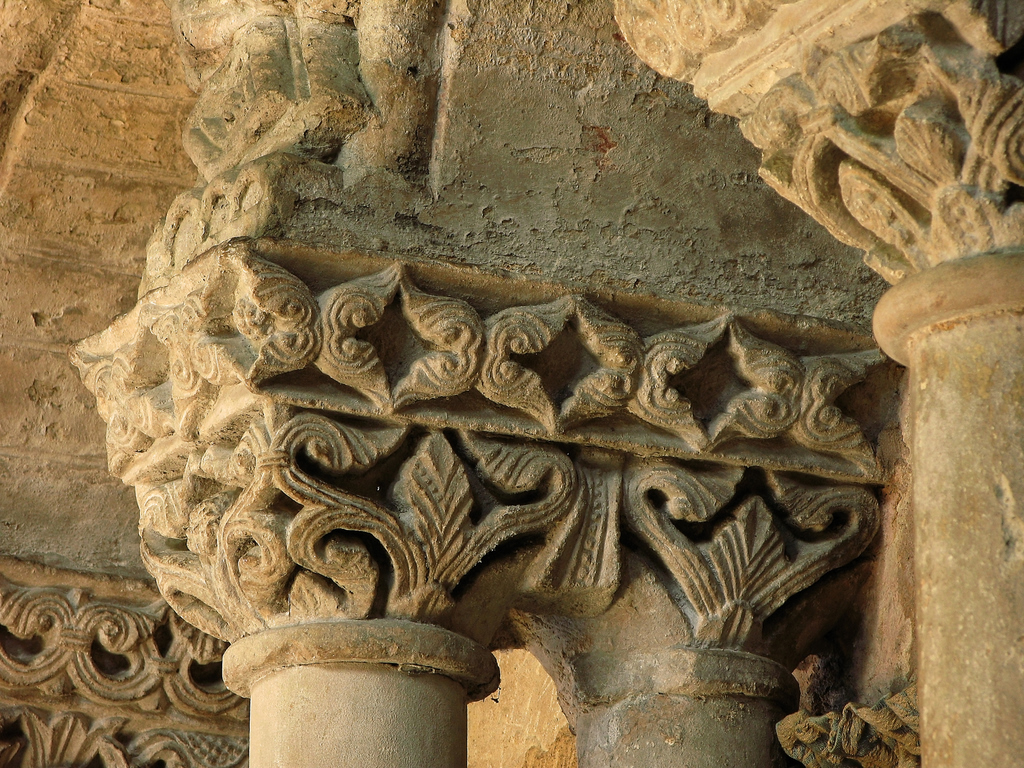
Close up of sedilia mouldings

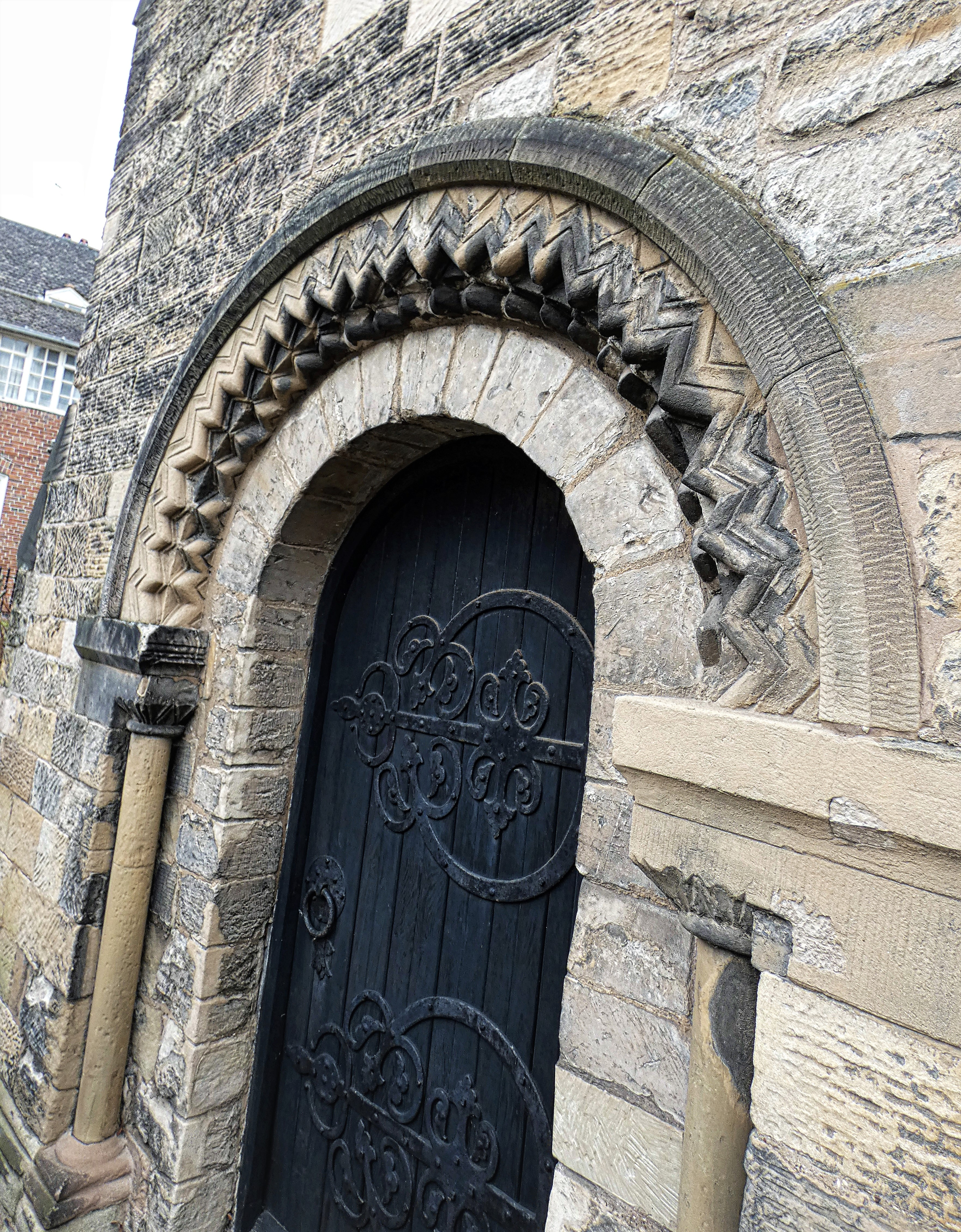
West Door

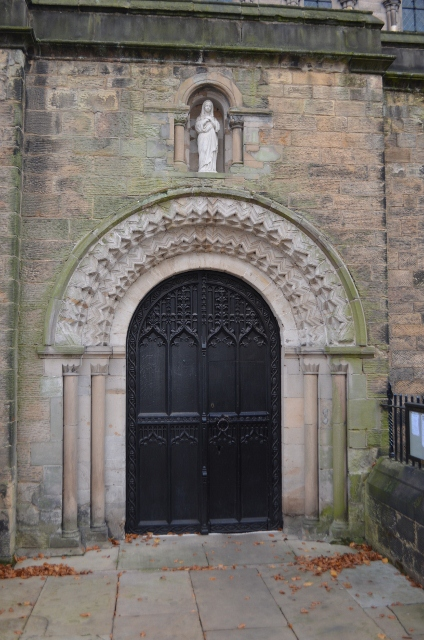
North Door
Stained glass

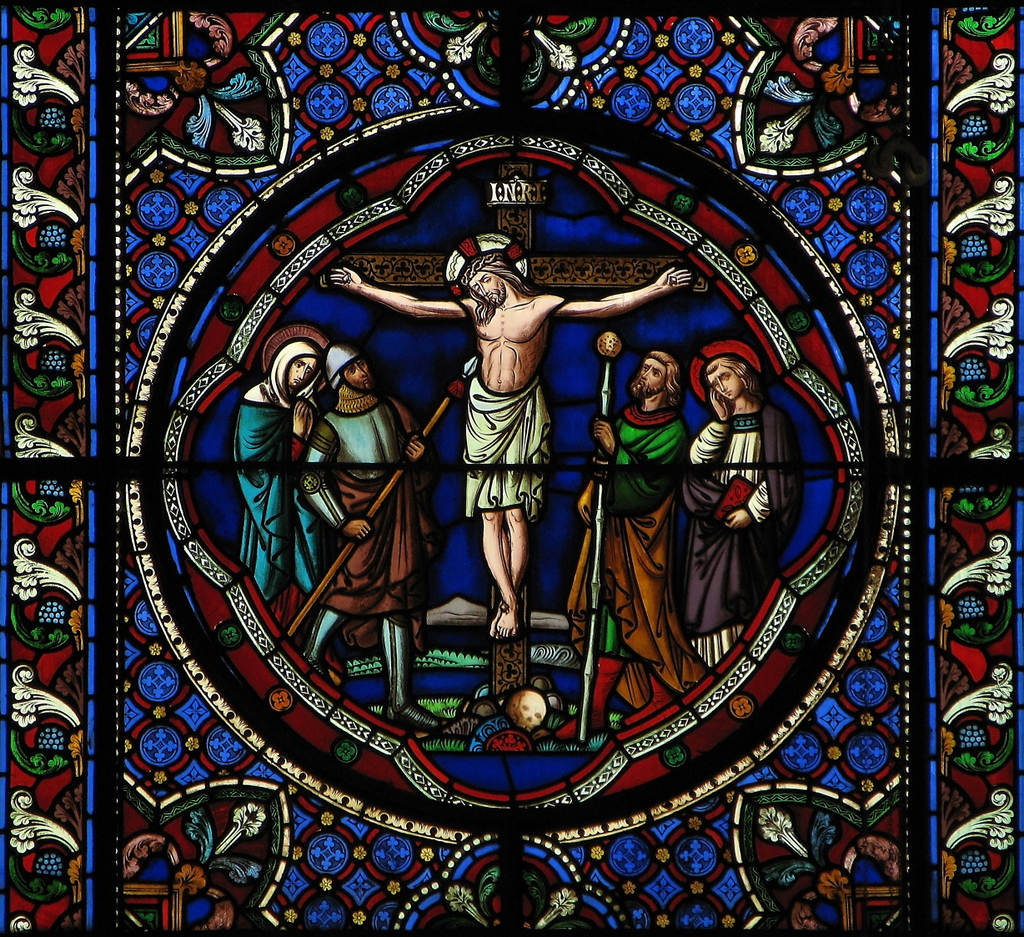
Chancel East Windows North Arch (Crucifixion)

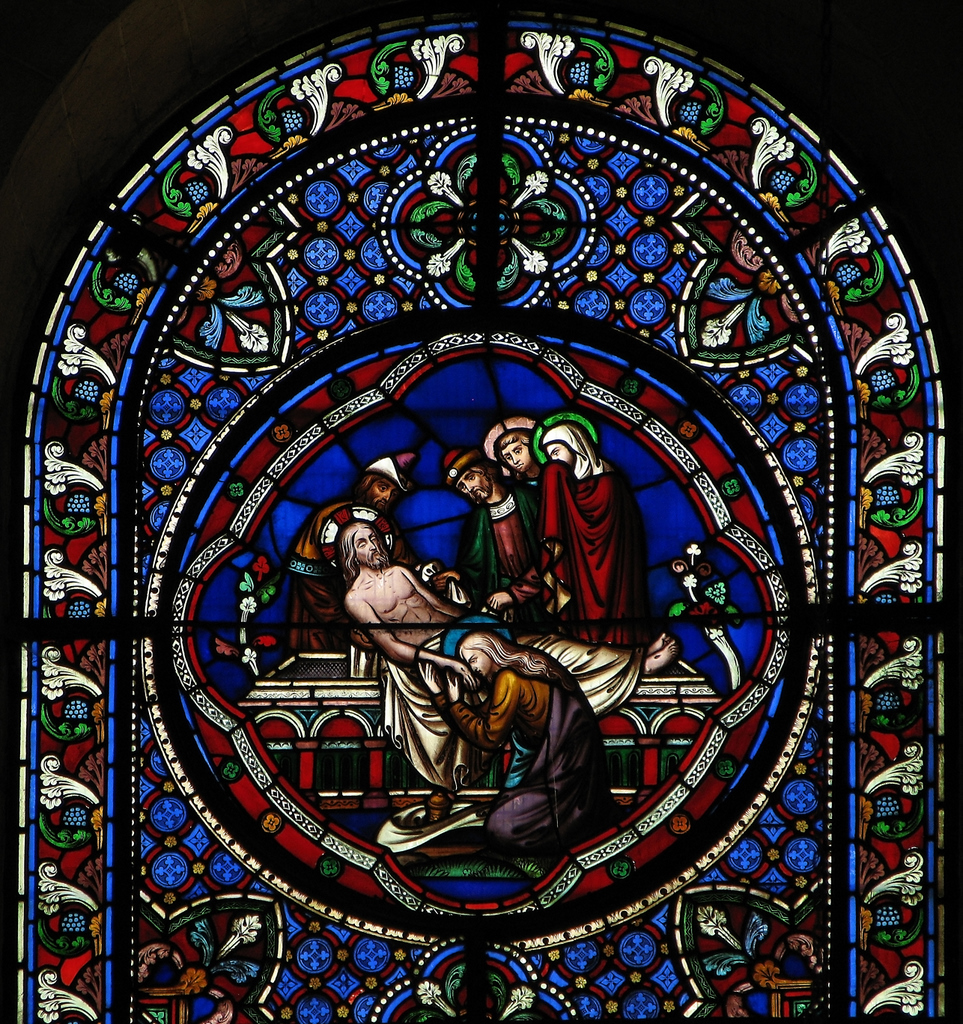
Chancel East Windows North Arch (Burial)

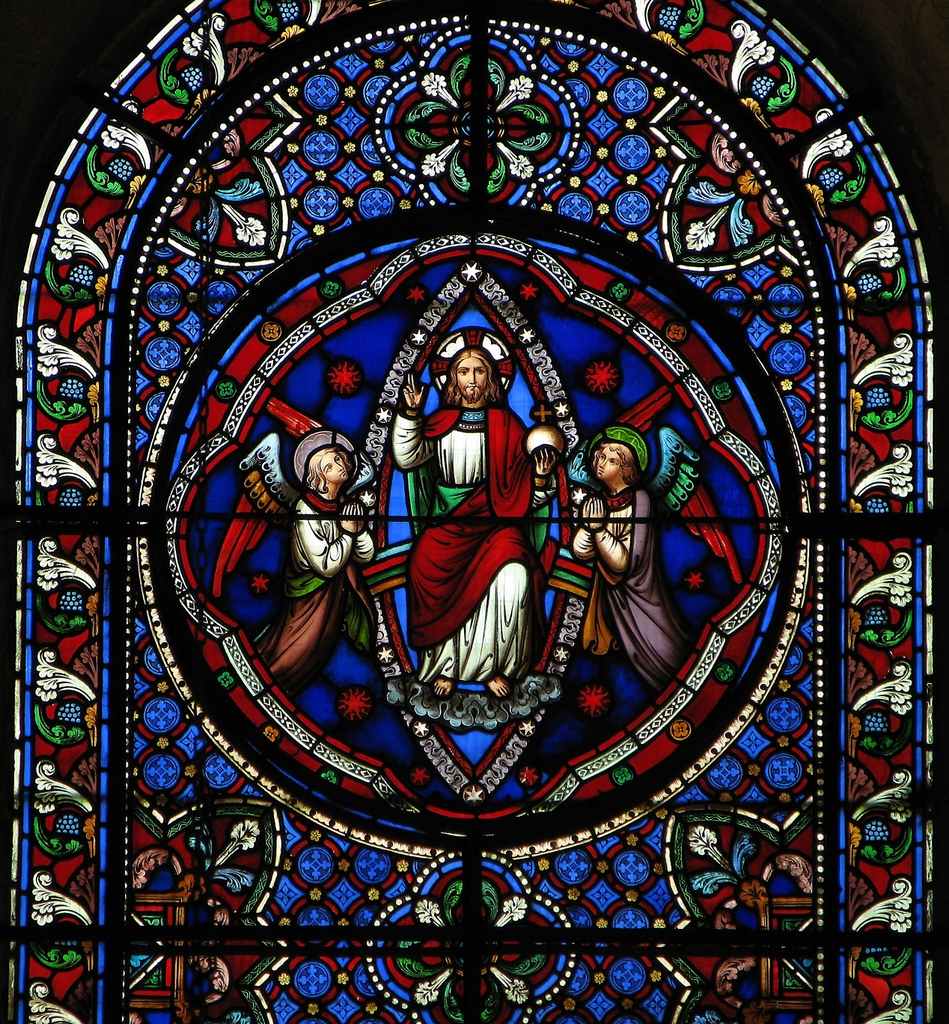
Chancel East Windows South Arch (Resurrection)

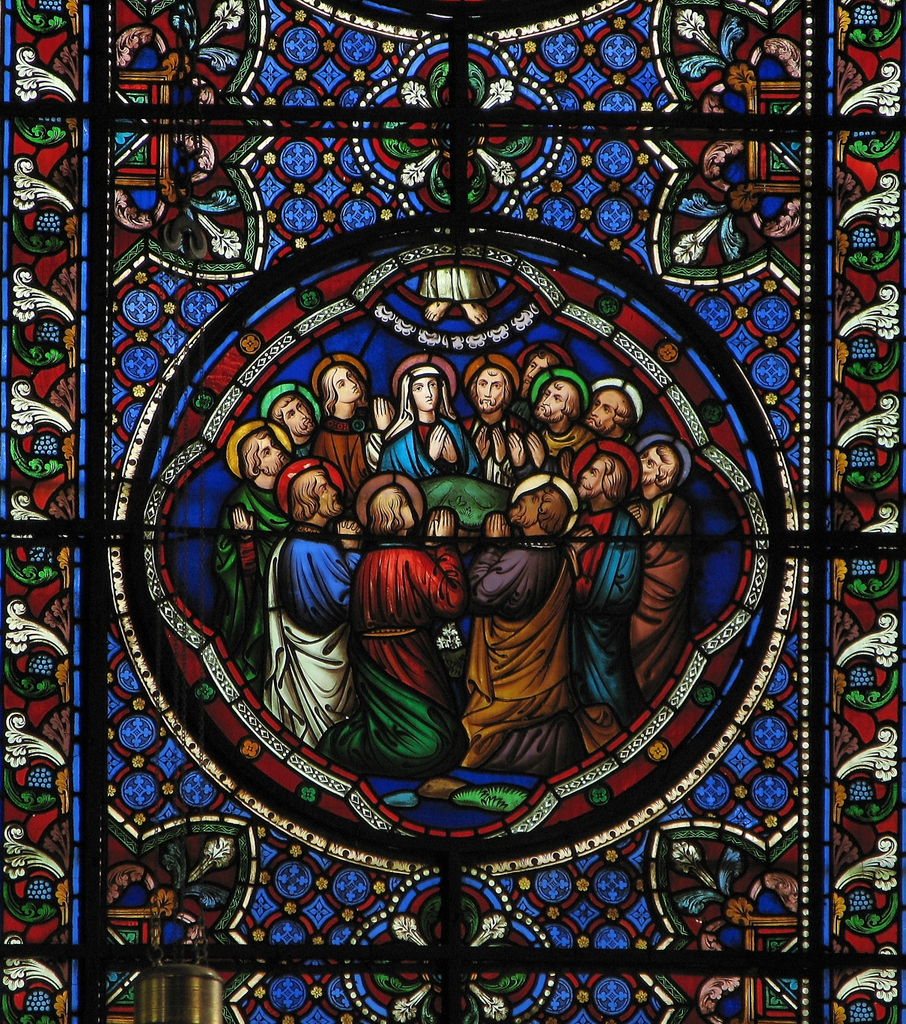
Chancel East Windows South Arch (Ascension)

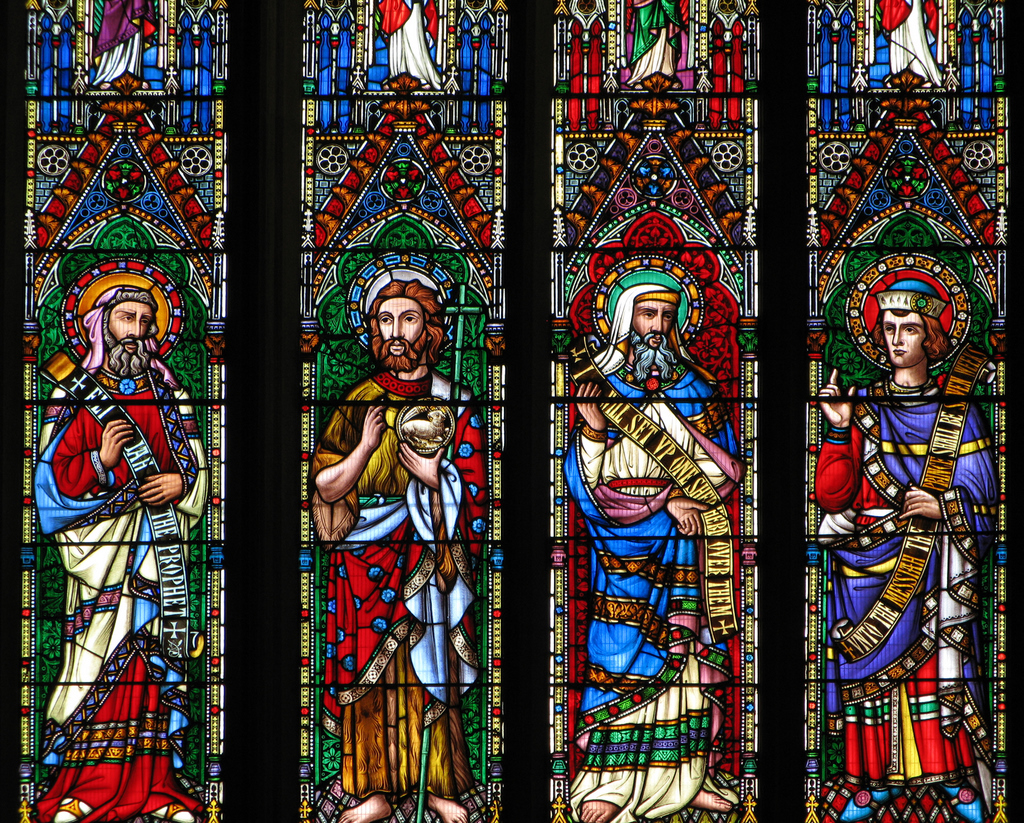
Nave west window (patriarchs and prophets)

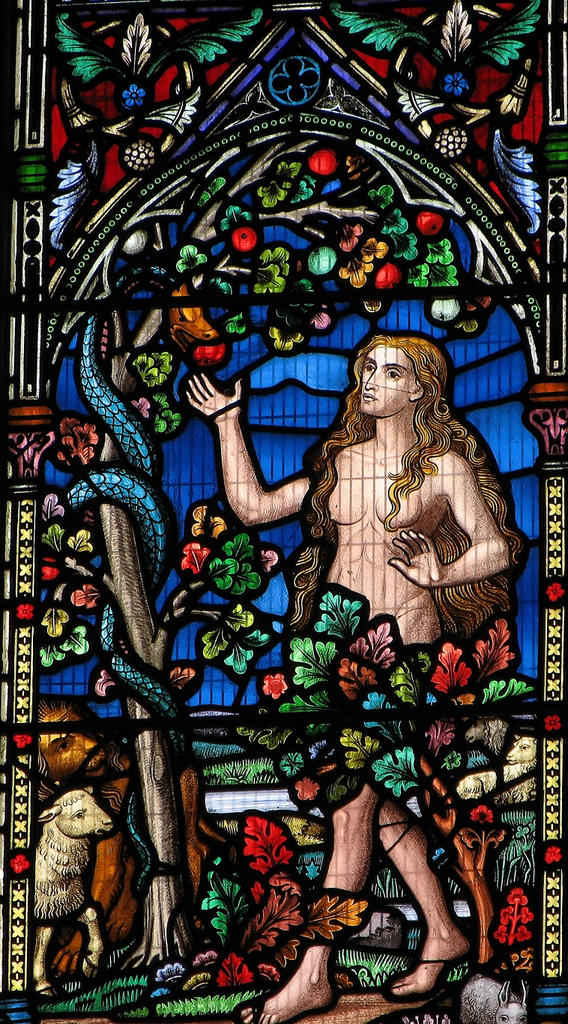
Nave west window (Eve)

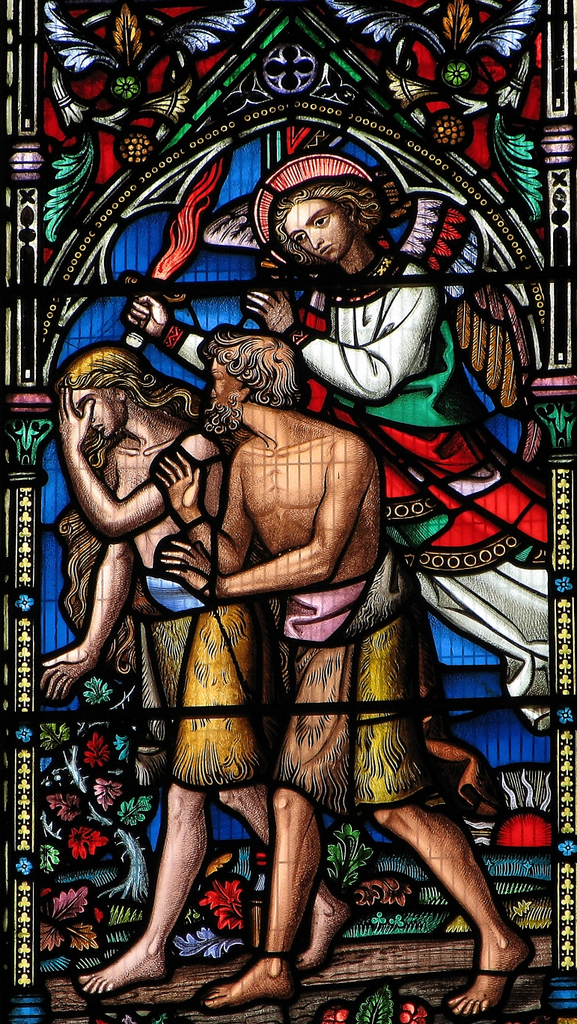
Nave west window (Banishment from Eden)

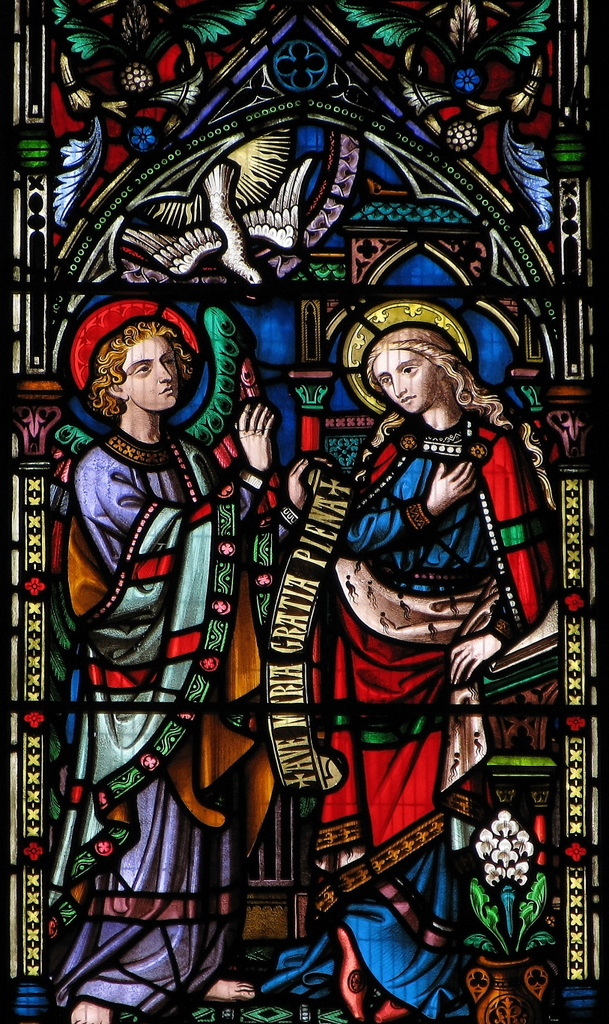
Nave west window (Annunciation)

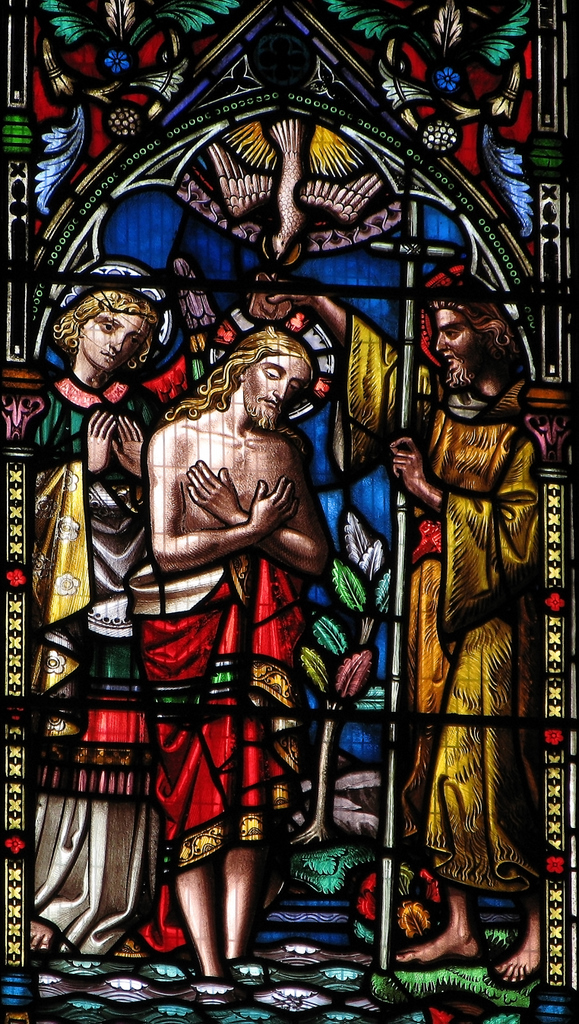
Nave west window (Baptism of Christ)

== See also ==
Leicester Castle and The Newarke precinct, showing the Motte and bailey (green), boundary walls of The Newarke (blue), and the southern side of the town wall (red).
The historic sites include:-
1 Leicester Castle
2 Castle gateway
3 Church of St Mary de Castro
4 Turret gateway
5 Trinity House - former Trinity Hospital
6 Newarke Houses Museum
7 site of Church of the Annunciation of Our Lady of the Newarke, now includes DMU heritage centre
8 Magazine Gateway
9 South gates
- Anglican churches in Leicester
- Grade I listed buildings in Leicester
- Leicester Castle
- Leicester Cathedral
- St Nicholas Church, Leicester
- St Margaret's Church, Leicester
- St Mary sub Castro, Dover (sometimes called St Mary de Castro)
