= Thomas Spofforth =

English organist

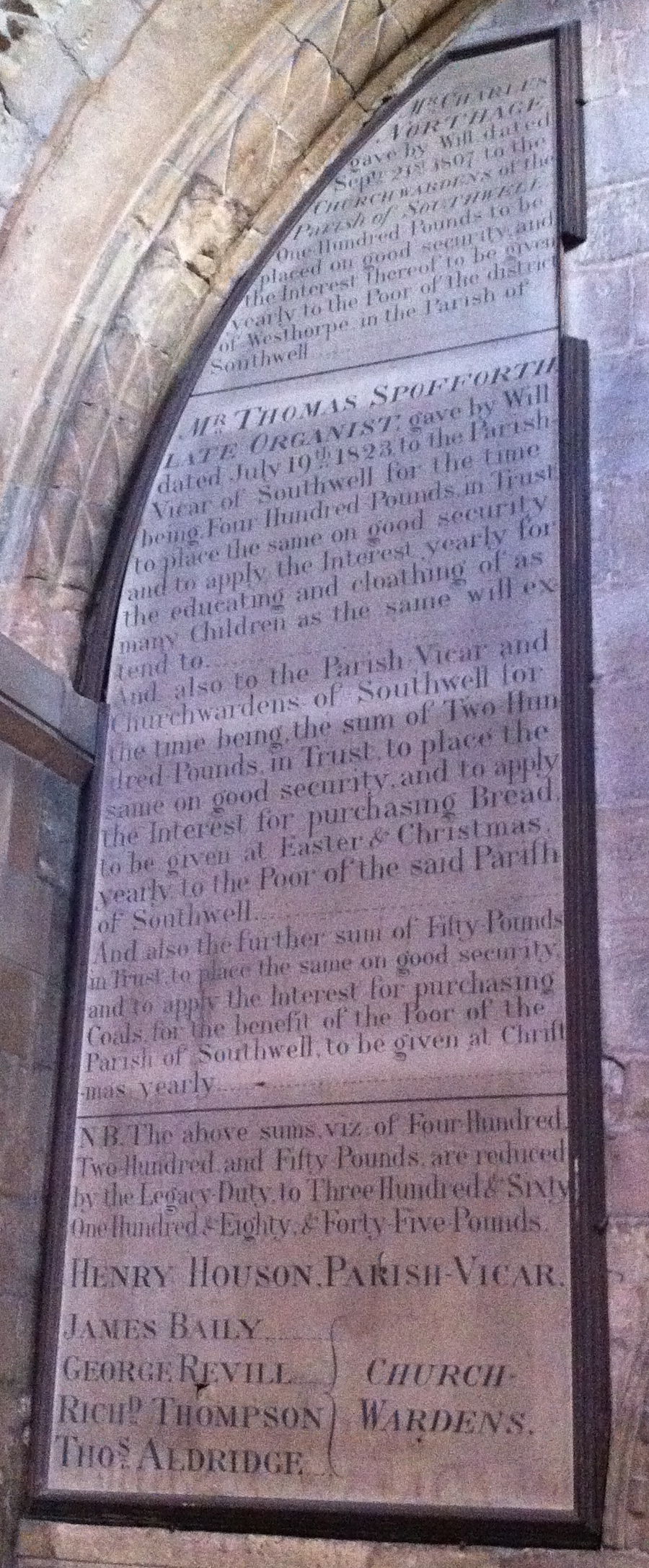
Board in the south transept of Southwell Minster recording the legacy of Thomas Spofforth

Thomas Spofforth, born 1743 and died on 16 May 1826, was an English organist.

== Life ==
One of his pupils was his nephew, Samuel Spofforth, who later became organist of Peterborough Cathedral and Lichfield Cathedral.

On 11 November 1804, he opened the new organ by George Pike England in the Church of St. Mary Magdalene, Newark-on-Trent.

He was granted a pension from the minster in 1818 of £25 per annum. He died at Southwell in 1826 and is buried in the south transept of Southwell Minster.

== Career ==
He was organist of Southwell Minster from 1764 to 1818
