= Anglican churches in Leicester =

A number of Anglican churches in Leicester are listed here. These belong to the Diocese of Leicester in the Church of England and are located in the city of Leicester, England.

== Cathedral church ==
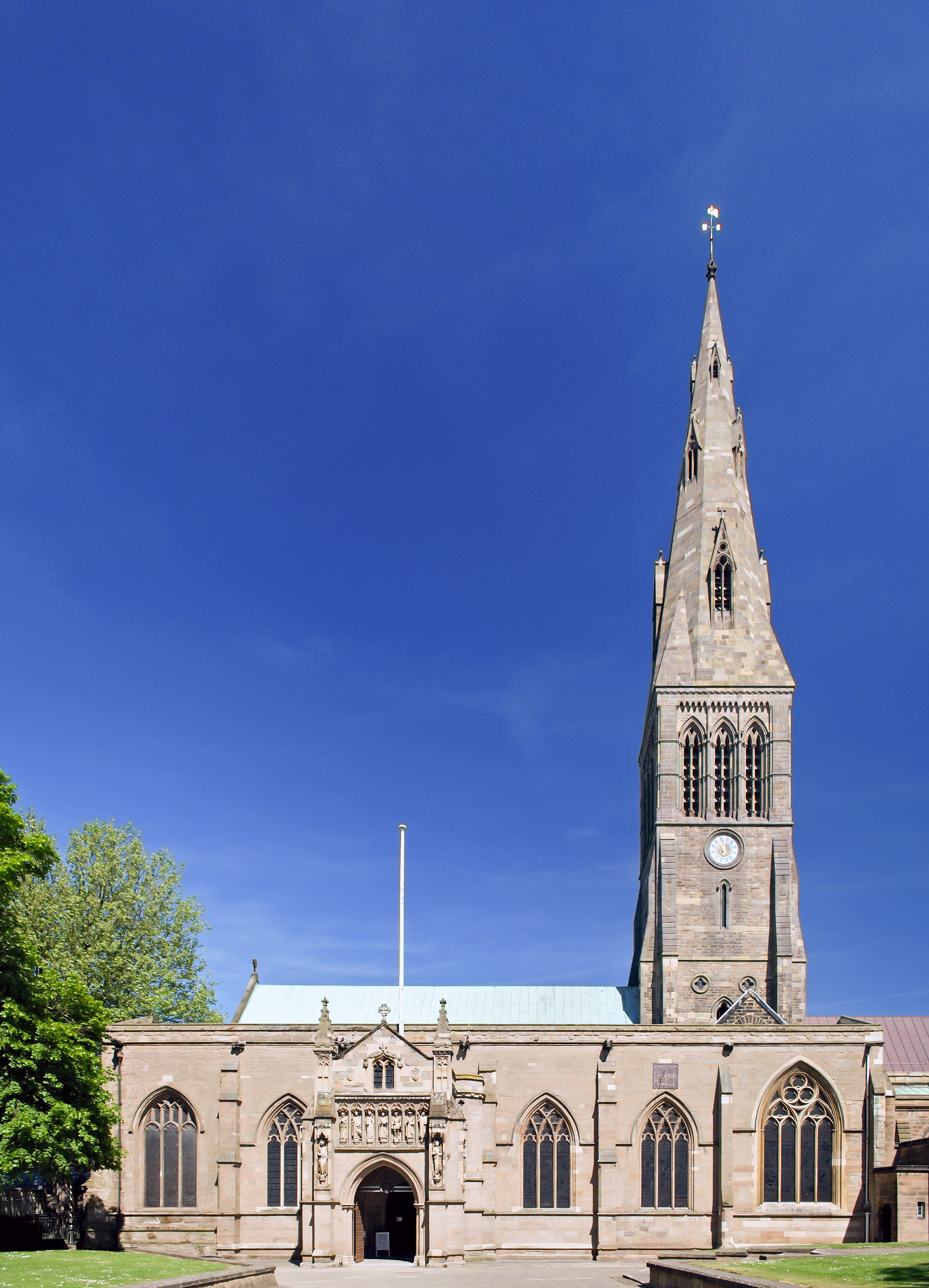
Leicester Cathedral

- Cathedral Church of St Martin, Leicester

== Open churches ==
- Holy Trinity, Regent Road
- St James the Greater, London Road
- St Margaret's Church, St Margaret's Way

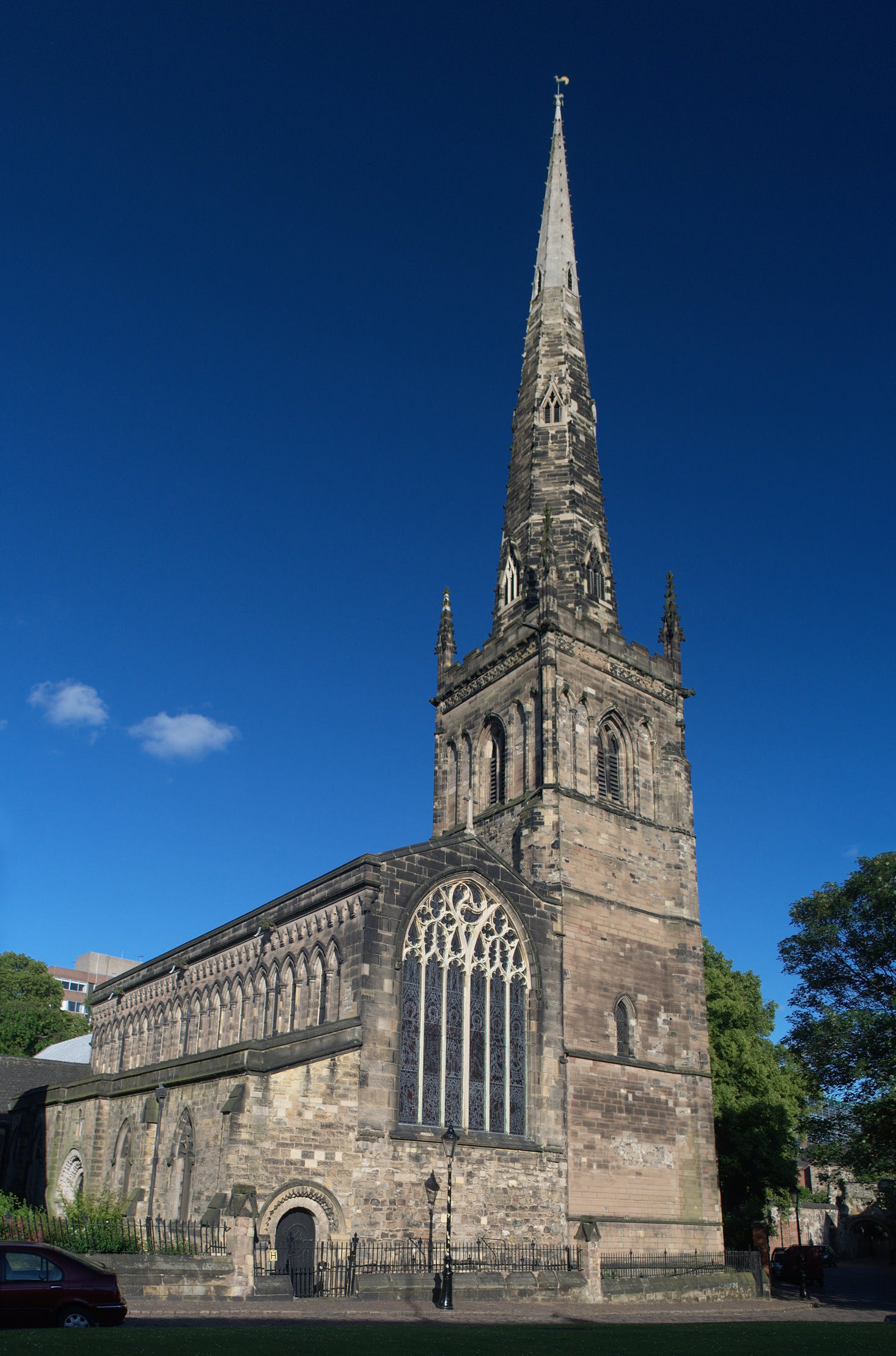
Church of St Mary de Castro, Leicester

- St Mary de Castro, Castle Yard
- St Nicholas, St Nicholas Circle
- St Peter, St Peter's Road

== Churches closed for regular services ==
- St Mark, Belgrave Gate - Now "The Empire" Conference Centre
- St Matthew, Montreal Road
- St Paul, Kirby Road
- St Saviour, St Saviour's Road
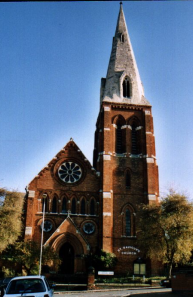
  St Saviour, St Saviour's Road. 2005

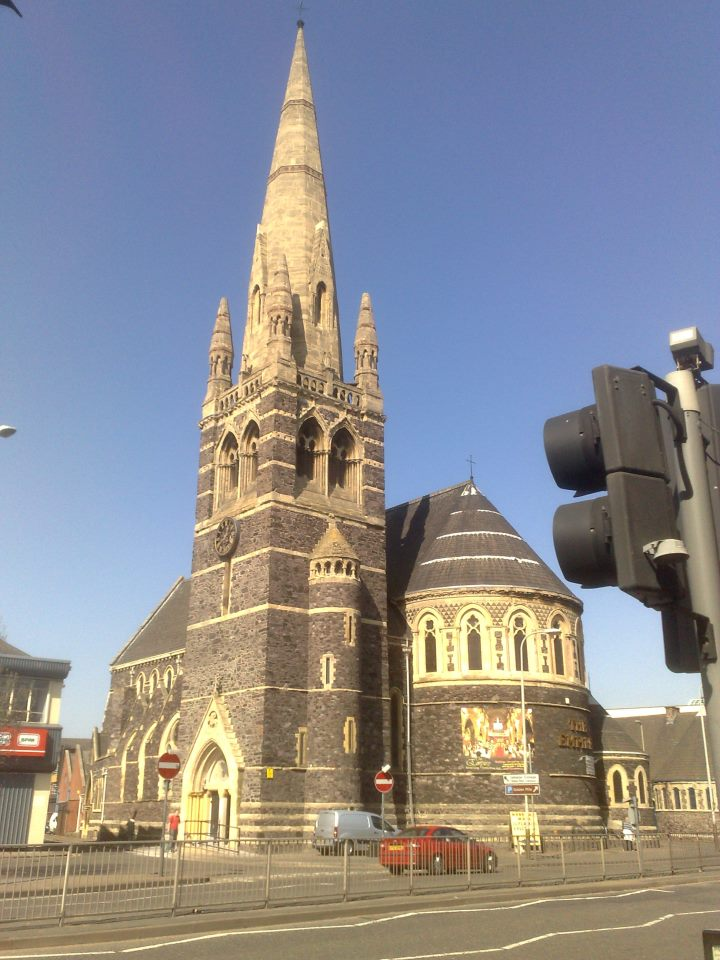
St Mark's, Belgrave - The Empire Conference Centre
