= William Brydges (organist) =

William Brydges (c. 1775 – 12 February 1835) was an organist and composer based in England.

== Life ==
He acted as Adjutant of the Loyal Newark Volunteers during the Napoleonic Wars.

On his appointment to Newark Parish Church in 1802 he arranged for a new organ to be installed built by George Pike. It was opened in 1804. He worked as an organist in the church until his death in 1835.

He was buried in the churchyard at Newark where his memorial stone reads: "Brydges, William, d. 12 Feb 1835, age: 58yr, ’32 years organist of this church…This tablet is erected by their surviving children’."

== Compositions ==
He composed works for choir and organ.

== Publications ==
His publications include:

- Words of Anthems for use in the Parish Church of Newark-on-Trent
