= Edward Dearle =

Edward Dearle (2 March 1806 – 20 March 1891) was an organist and composer based in England.

== Life ==
He was born in Cambridge in 1806 the son of John Dearle and Harriet Harrison, and was a chorister at King's College, Cambridge by John Pratt, the organist.

He was awarded Bachelor of Music at Cambridge in 1836 and Doctor of Music in 1842.

In 1837 he won the Gresham Prize for his anthem Turn thee again.

He was a founder of Trinity College, Weymouth Street, Portland Place, London in 1875.

He married Catherine Mullins (1817–1880) and they had the following children:

- Edward John Dearle (1833–1896)
- Harriett Dearle (1835–1906)
- Sophia Dearle (1837–1908)
- Clara Sophia Dearle (1841–1911)
- Julia Catherine Dearle (1844–1881)
- Elizabeth Dearle (1845–1916)
- Catherine Mary Dearle (1846–1914)
- Louisa Anna Dearle (1848–1874)
- Ada Dearle (1850–1899)
- John George Dearle (b. 1851)

== Appointments ==
- Organist of St. Paul's Church, Deptford 1827–1830
- Organist of Blackheath Parish Church 1830–1832
- Organist of St. Peter's Church, Wisbeach 1832–1833
- Organist of the Collegiate Church of St Mary, Warwick 1833–1835
- Organist of the Church of St. Mary Magdalene, Newark-on-Trent 1835 – 1864

== Compositions ==
His compositions include:

- Anthem Turn thee again
- Morning Service in C
- Evening Service in A
- Evening Service in G minor
- Magnificat and Nunc Dimitis in F
- Oratorio Israel in The Wilderness
