= Steve Bickerstaff =

American lawyer (1946–2019)

- Born: Robert Stephen Bickerstaff, Jr. April 15, 1946; Sweetwater, Texas, United States
- Died: October 4, 2019 (aged 73)
- Education: University of Texas at Austin
- Occupations: Lawyer; Legal Scholar; Author
- Years active: 1975-2019
- Spouse: Charlotte Carter (married 1983)

Robert Stephen Bickerstaff Jr. (April 15, 1946 – October 4, 2019) was an American lawyer, legal scholar, expert on redistricting, and book author.

Bickerstaff attended the University of Texas at Austin (BA, 1968) and the University of Texas School of Law (JD). He was on active duty as a first lieutenant in the United States Air Force (1971–1973). He served as Parliamentarian of the Senate of Texas (1975–1976) after serving as a counsel for the Texas Constitutional Convention (1974) and the Texas Constitutional Revision Commission (1973). Beginning in 1976, he served as an assistant attorney general of Texas. In 1980, he formed the private law firm of Bickerstaff, Heath and Smiley, now Bickerstaff, Heath, Delgado, Acosta. Bickerstaff was an adjunct professor of law at the University of Texas Law School in Austin, Texas, beginning in 1992.

In 2007, the University of Texas Press published his book Lines in the Sand: Congressional Redistricting in Texas and the Downfall of Tom DeLay. The book covers the history of the 2003 Texas congressional redistricting and its aftermath. He is also the author or co-author of two books of legal analysis published by the Texas Legislative Council, and author of the forthcoming book Election Systems and Gerrymandering Worldwide (Springer, 2020).
