= William Bickerstaffe =

Leicestershire curate and antiquarian

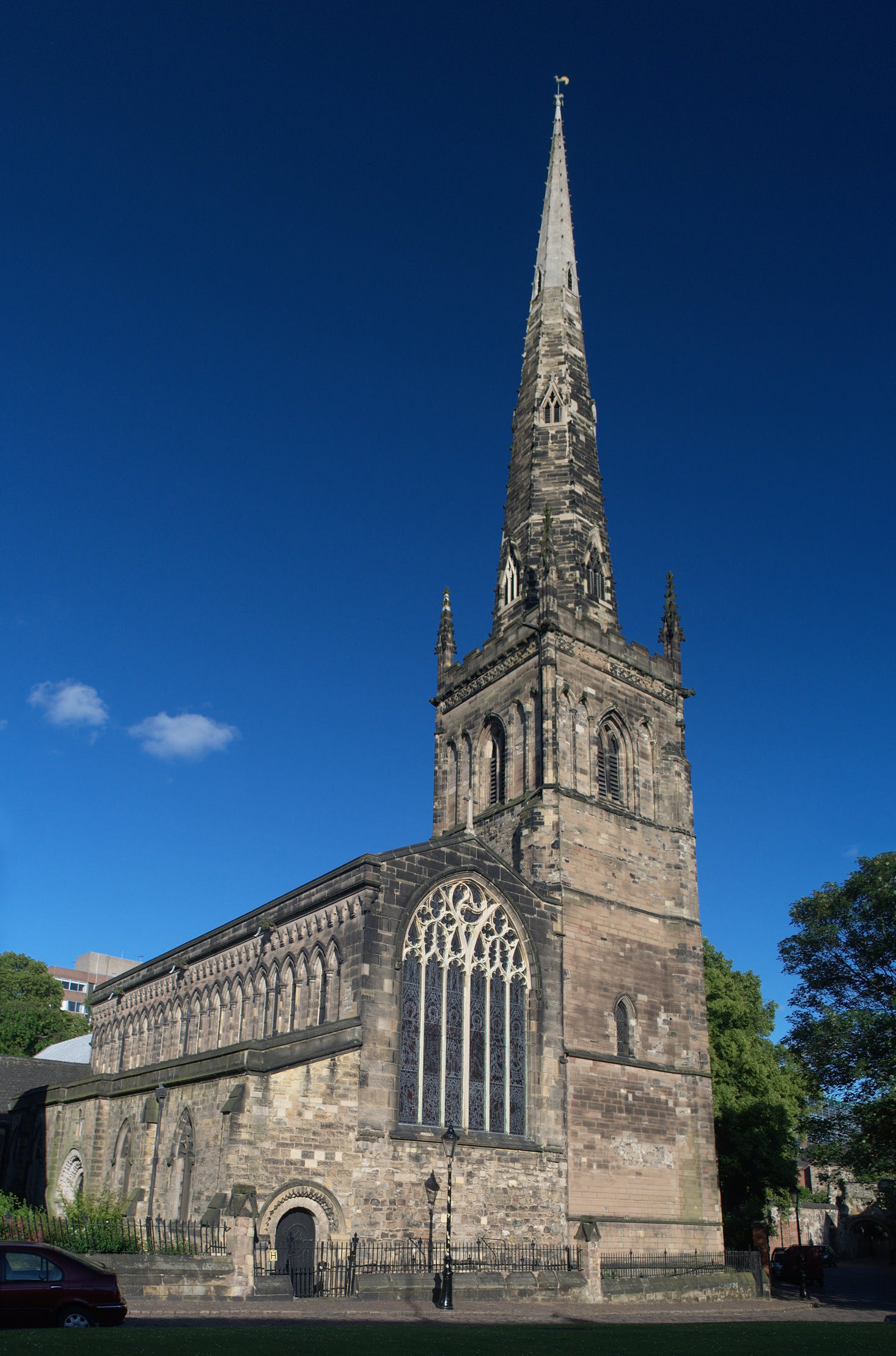
The Church of St Mary de Castro, Leicester, where Bickerstaff was baptised in 1728, held a curacy for seven years, and was buried in 1789.

William Bickerstaff or Bickerstaffe (bapt. 18 August 1728 – 26 January 1789) was an English antiquarian, curate and schoolmaster. He was a well known character in his home county of Leicestershire, remembered for his humour and charity, with several of his letters printed posthumously in The Gentleman's Magazine and John Nichols' historical works, because of their perceived quaintness. Bickerstaff is also remembered as a keen local antiquarian, writing articles and letters to fellow antiquarians on his historical researches.

== Early life ==
William Bickerstaffe was born in August 1728, and baptised at Church of St Mary de Castro, Leicester, on 18 August 1728. He was born as the third child and only son of the glazier and freeman William Bickerstaffe (c. 1697–1739) and his wife, Hannah (1697–1769), daughter of Mary and Joseph How. On 29 December 1749, in his father's footsteps, he became a freeman of the city of Leicester.

== Ecclesiastical and educational career ==
On 30 January 1750, Bickerstaffe was made the Under-Usher (i.e. schoolmaster) of the local Free Grammar School. On 23 December 1770, he was ordained deacon and qualified to be a "literate person"; in 1770, he was licensed to a curacy at Syston. On 22 December the following year, he was made a priest. He worked as a curate for seven years in the Church of St Mary de Castro, subsequently curate for six years in All Saints Church, Leicester. In 1772 he published a collection of poetry, Bickerstaff's Fables, one of which, 'The Hawk and the Partridge', was reprinted in the Leicester and Nottingham Journal. He was described in his obituary in The Gentleman's Magazine as having "occasionally been curate at most of the churches in his native town", while also having worked in the nearby parishes of Aylestone and Wigston Magna.

Later in his life, when struck by his impoverished situation, Bickerstaffe loosed a succession of appeals to local parishes, asking for preferment to recently vacated offices in their churches, as they came available. He never received any preferment in his lifetime, but, posthumously, his case for promotion was taken before the Lord Chancellor, Edward Thurlow, 1st Baron Thurlow. The judge concluded that he would have been promoted for his dedication to his church duties, if not for his sudden death. These letters where reprinted, both in The Gentleman's Magazine and Nichols' History and Antiquities of the County of Leicester (1795); the editors saw the communications as a curiosities and apparently printed them "for their quaintness".

== Character and death ==
Bickerstaffe's was well known among his parishes as a charitable and humorous man. He supported Sunday schools in Leicester and Aylestone with his unpaid labour and charitable donations, even while he was "a poor curate, unsupported by private property", as he described himself at fifty-eight; Bickerstaffe survived, for most of his life, on his meager schoolmaster's salary of £19 6s, supplemented with the wage of a curate. He used his (admittedly limited) medical knowledge to help the ill in his parishes, and donated the small surplus that came of his wages to local charitable causes. Both John Throsby and John Nichols reproduced satirical or humorous anecdotes of Bickstaffe's in their works. One such anecdote, recorded by Nichols, records an event where the clerk of a dissenting meeting house was tricked into lining out the popular Ballad of Chevy Chase, rather than the intended hymn. The same tale was more colourfully, and independently, recorded by composer William Gardiner (1770-1853) in his memoir Music and Friends (1836).

Bickerstaffe was also an educated man, and a keen antiquarian. His many contributions to historical research—which constitutes the majority of his written work—survive in his frequent articles for The Gentleman's Magazine, or in letters to fellow antiquarians. Nichols was one such correspondent and later went on to use Bickerstaffe's knowledge of local history in writing his History of Leicester (1795).

On 26 January 1789, at the age of sixty-one, William Bickerstaffe died unexpectedly in his sleep; he was reportedly in good health the previous day. In his obituary, he was described as "appearing to have expired, as he had always wished, without a struggle or a groan." He was buried three days later, on 29 January, in the churchyard of St Mary de Castro, alongside his parents and two sisters. Following his death, an obituary was published in The Gentleman's Magazine, accompanied by selections from his correspondence. The monument in St Mary's contains a poetic epitaph on his life:

No noisy vain applause, no dazzling blaze!
Mark'd the progression of his quiet days:
Yet let this monumental tablet tell
That praise, which living he deserv'd so well;
His joys were, Nature’s sorrows to relieve,
He gave the needy all he had to give.
To classic lore he led the mind of youth,
And taught to all the heav'nly paths of truth.
His humble life with great examples fraught –
Himself the mirror of the truths he taught.
If, Reader, one more perfect you would know,
Trace him in Heaven – such are not here below!

== Sources ==
- Cave, Edward, ed. (1789). The Gentleman's Magazine, Vol. 59, Pt. 1. 1st ser. London: John Nichols.
- Dyer, Thomas Firminger Thiselton (1886). "Bickerstaff, William" . In Stephen, Leslie (ed.). Dictionary of National Biography. Vol. 5. London: Smith, Elder & Co.
- Jenkins, Robin P. (2004). "Bickerstaffe, William". Oxford Dictionary of National Biography (online ed.). Oxford University Press. doi:10.1093/ref:odnb/2343. (Subscription, Wikipedia Library access or UK public library membership required.)
