= Humphrey Perkins School =

Location
- Cotes Road; Barrow Upon Soar, Loughborough, Leicestershire, LE12 8JU; England; 52.7554°N 1.1521°W

Information
- Type: Academy
- Motto: Honeste Audax ("Honourably Bold")
- Established: 1717
- Founder: Humphrey Perkins
- Department for Education URN: 137799 Tables
- Ofsted: Reports
- Headmistress: Della Bartram
- Gender: Mixed
- Age: 11 to 16
- Enrolment: 902
- Houses: Belvoir, Chatsworth, Hardwick and Kedleston
- Website: http://www.humphreyperkins.leics.sch.uk/

The Humphrey Perkins School is a secondary school with academy status which was founded in 1717 in Barrow upon Soar, Leicestershire, in England.

== History ==
=== Grammar school ===
The school was founded as the Humphrey Perkins Grammar School in 1717 in the will of Humphrey Perkins. Perkins was born in Barrow upon Soar and went to the University of Cambridge before becoming the rector of Holme Pierrepont, Nottinghamshire, until his death in 1717. He left money for a grammar school to be built in Barrow upon Soar, and after land was acquired on an orchard near the centre of the village, the school opened in 1735 with 32 pupils.

In 1902 the school moved to larger premises on Cotes Road, with the school's first non-clergyman headmaster, Fernsby, and 33 pupils. Of these pupils 32 were boys with just one girl, Nora May Wall. In 1927 the then headmaster, Keeble, introduced a school uniform of black blazer, badge and ties. Examples of this uniform are still kept by the current headmistress, along with a school rugby shirt. The four houses were named after pre-eminent Leicestershire families as Beaumont, Grey, Hastings and Latimer.

=== Bilateral School ===
In 1947, following the 1944 Education Act, the school admitted children from the age of 13 who had not passed the eleven plus but who had continued their education at what were called senior schools in their home villages.The school was thenceforth designated a bi-lateral school. Some of these pupils took O levels and joined the sixth form. Nissen huts were built to accommodate them as well as to provide science laboratories. In 1956 following the building of the Orchard Block adjacent to the site the school became fully comprehensive with approximately 500 pupils. Robert Dunn became headmaster in 1960, and discussions began about whether Humphrey Perkins or the nearby Rawlins Grammar School at Quorn would be the 'Upper School' in the new two-tier Leicestershire education model.

=== Comprehensive three-tier system ===
In 1966 Humphrey Perkins was converted to a junior high school for 11- to 14-year-olds, with some 1000 pupils.

=== Academy ===
In September 2010, Peter Nutkins joined the school as Headmaster, and the school underwent a period of rapid reorganisation and development. On 1 January 2012 Humphrey Perkins became an Academy School and converted to an 11–16 that same year, taking older pupils from September 2013.

== Teaching ==
The school was inspected in 2011–12 and issued with a notice to improve after being judged inadequate. Only 14 months later the school was judged as 'good' by the return OFSTED inspection as the improvements that had taken place brought about change.

Pupils within the school were given iPads to encourage creativity. The school held training events for other schools on the use of the devices in the classroom. Nutkins took a strong stance on including creative subjects in the curriculum and is a member of the Heads for Arts national lobby group.

In September 2017, most iPads were removed from the school, with pupils no longer having them, but the staff still use them.

== Notable former pupils ==
- Louise Lear, née Barden, BBC weather presenter, from Rothley (took her O-levels and A-levels at Quorn)
- Jenny Tomlinson, née Mills, Archdeacon of Birmingham since 2019, from Quorn (took her O-levels and A-levels at Quorn)

=== Humphrey Perkins Grammar School ===
- Veronica van Heyningen FRS, née Daniel geneticist, worked on the Human Genome Project
