= Jenny Tomlinson =

Archdeacon of Birmingham since 2019 (born 1961)

Jennifer Clare Tomlinson (née Mills) (born 10 August 1961) has been Archdeacon of Birmingham, England, since 2019.

== Early life ==
Tomlinson was educated at Humphrey Perkins School up to the age of 16 and took her A levels at Rawlins Academy in Quorn, Leicestershire. She attended St Bartholomew's Church, Quorn.

She studied history at Trinity Hall, Cambridge.

== Church ==
She was ordained after a period of study at Ridley Hall, Cambridge. Her first posts were curacies in Godalming. She was a hospital chaplain at Thurrock from 1998 to 2009; and Bishop's Adviser on Women's Ministry from 2008 until her appointment as Archdeacon.

== Personal life ==
She married in 1993, and has two daughters.

Church of England titles
Preceded by Hayward Osborne	Archdeacon of Birmingham; 2019–	Succeeded by Incumbent
