= George Martin (rugby union) =

England international rugby union player

- Full name: George Frederick Martin
- Born: 18 June 2001 (age 25) Nottingham, England
- Height: 1.98 m (6 ft 6 in)
- Weight: 126 kg (278 lb; 19 st 12 lb)
- School: Rawlins Academy; Brooksby Melton College

Rugby union career
- Position(s): Lock, Flanker
- Current team: Saracens
Senior career
Years	Team	Apps	(Points)
2019–2026	Leicester Tigers	80	(45)
2019–2020	→ Leicester Lions (loan)	4	(0)
2026–	Saracens	0	(0)
- Correct as of 13 June 2026
International career
Years	Team	Apps	(Points)
2018–2019	England U18	19	(5)
2021–	England	24	(5)
- Correct as of 18 July 2026

George Frederick Martin (born 18 June 2001) is an English professional rugby union player who plays as a lock for PREM Rugby club Saracens and the England national team. Between 2019 and 2026 he played 80 times for Leicester Tigers, winning the 2022 title.

== Early life ==
Martin was born in Nottingham, and grew up mostly in Loughborough. His father worked as an accountant. He attended Rawlins Academy in Quorn, Leicestershire where he was selected for England's under-16 rugby union team. He then attended Brooksby Melton College where he was selected for England's under-18 side. He scored a try against France under-18 during their 2018 summer tour of South Africa and in April 2019 captained at the under-18 Six Nations Festival. Martin was part of Leicester Tigers two successive under 18 league titles.

== Club career ==
In July 2019 Martin signed his first professional contract for Leicester Tigers. On 21 September 2019 Martin made his first team debut for Leicester in a Premiership Rugby Cup fixture against Worcester Warriors. He spent a period of time during the 2019–20 season on loan at Leicester Lions, playing 4 times. On 7 July 2020 he signed a new contract with Leicester.

Martin was named as BT Sport's man of the match for Leicester's win against Newcastle Falcons in the 2020–21 European Rugby Challenge Cup quarter-finals. He started in the semi-final victory over Ulster. He was not selected for the final which saw Leicester lose against Montpellier to finish runners-up.

Martin was named player of the match after their opening game of the 2021–22 Premiership Rugby season, a 34–19 victory over Exeter Chiefs. He ended the season playing in the final as a replacement and making the penultimate carry before Freddie Burns' 80th minute drop goal which won the match to make Leicester champions. Later that year on 28 September 2022 Martin extended his contract at Leicester.

In December 2025, Leicester confirmed Martin would be leaving the club at the end of the season to join Saracens.

== International career ==
On 1 January 2021 Martin was selected for England under-20s squad for the 2021 U20 Six Nations, then on 22 January 2021 he was named in coach Eddie Jones' "Shadow squad" for the senior 2021 Six Nations Championship. Martin was named as a "finisher" for the England match against Wales, but was not used.

On 20 March 2021, Martin made his England Test debut in the last round of the tournament against Ireland, coming on as a replacement for Billy Vunipola in the 64th minute in a 32–18 defeat.

On 5 August 2023 Martin started his first international, a Rugby World Cup warm up match against Wales at the Millennium Stadium. On 7 August 2023, Martin was named in England's squad for the 2023 Rugby World Cup. He came off the bench as a substitute during their quarter-final victory over Fiji and started the semi-final elimination against champions South Africa.

=== List of international tries ===
as of 4 July 2026

No.	Date	Venue	Opponent	Score	Result	Competition	Ref.
1	4 July 2026	Ellis Park Stadium, Johannesburg, South Africa	South Africa	17–12	45–21	2026 Nations Championship	

== Injuries and body management ==
Martin has experienced knee and other injuries, and is cognisant of longevity in his body management.

== Honours ==
Leicester Tigers

- PREM Rugby: 2021–2022
- EPCR Challenge Cup runner-up: 2020–2021

England

- Rugby World Cup third place: 2023
