= Louise Lear =

British television and radio journalist

- Born: Tracy Louise Barden; 14 December 1967 (age 57); Sheffield, Yorkshire, England
- Education: Rawlins Academy, Quorn, Leicestershire
- Alma mater: Middlesex University (BA)
- Spouse: Ian Lear (m. 1990)

Louise Lear (born Tracy Louise Barden, 14 December 1967) is a British television and radio journalist who works as a presenter for BBC Weather. She has appeared on BBC News, BBC World News, BBC Red Button and BBC Radio. She is also a regular forecaster on the BBC News at Six and was previously a weekend presenter on BBC Breakfast.

== Early life and education ==
Lear was born in 1967 in Sheffield, Yorkshire. She grew up in the village of Rothley in the Borough of Charnwood, Leicestershire and went to the Humphrey Perkins School, until the age of 14. She took her O-levels and A-levels at Rawlins Academy in Quorn, gaining four in 1985.

She graduated from Middlesex University in 1988 with a Bachelor of Arts degree in Music and Drama. She plays the piano and clarinet.

== Career ==
After a period as a researcher for Children's BBC, she took the job of sports presenter for an independent radio production company, covering amongst other events the 1994 Winter Olympics in Lillehammer.

Lear began her career as a weather presenter at Central Television in 1992 and then spent two years at LBC in London. She joined the UK Weather Channel at its launch in 1996 and took up her most recent post at the BBC in April 1998.

Lear has presented other BBC programmes, including Trading Up on BBC One. She was chosen to undertake the role as she and her husband have renovated four houses in London, including a cottage where they lived with their two young children. She has presented the weather forecast on the BBC One programme Countryfile. She memorably giggled through a BBC weather forecast in 2016.

== Personal life ==
She married Ian Lear of Quorn, Leicestershire, at St Botolph's Church, Shepshed, in 1990; the honeymoon was in Florida.
