= Winfrid Burrows =

Anglican clergyman (1858–1929)

The Right Reverend Winfrid Burrows
- Bishop of Chichester
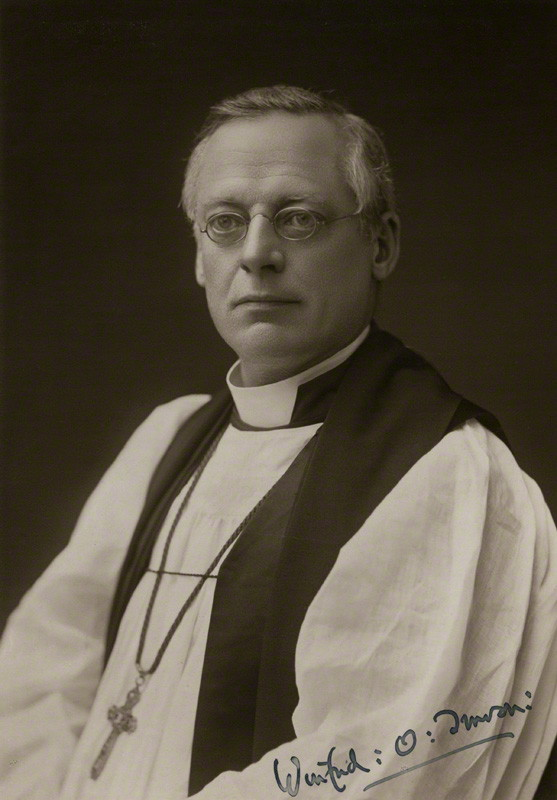
- Burrows in 1914
- Diocese: Diocese of Chichester
- In office: 1919–1929 (death)
- Predecessor: Charles Ridgeway
- Successor: George Bell
- Other post: Bishop of Truro (1912–1919)

Personal details
- Born: 9 November 1858
- Died: 13 February 1929 (aged 70)
- Denomination: Anglican
- Education: University of Oxford

Winfrid Oldfield Burrows (9 November 1858 – 13 February 1929) was the Bishop of Truro and later Chichester in the first third of the 20th century.

Born into an ecclesiastical family, Burrows was educated at Eton and Corpus Christi College, Oxford and ordained in 1888. Appointed a Tutor at Christ Church, Oxford in 1883 he was later Principal of the Leeds Clergy School and afterwards Vicar of Holy Trinity in the same city. He was vicar of St Augustine's Church, Edgbaston from 1903 to 1912 and was named Archdeacon of Birmingham in 1904. In 1908 he turned down the post of Archbishop of Cape Town.

Burrows had planned a trip to Canada when the First World War began in August, 1914. He supported British participation in the War, and his monthly published diocesan magazines are filled with examples of clergy, clergy families, and church organisations committed to the War effort. For example, a Clerical Roll of Honour listed clergy and their sons 'serving their country', including, in May, 1915, 62 named by vicarage with one case of 6 of the same family. In 1917, a list of daughters serving as nurses, teachers, cooks and munition workers was published. Deaths of clergy and their sons and bravery awards featured prominently. However, Burrows did not favour clergy serving as combatants. He said, "The impulse is good but it must be restrained. Whilst the 'general instinct is right' ... it would be shocking to us to realise that the hands that baptise our infants or break bread in the Sacrament, have just been working a machine gun or launching lethal gas on the fire"

In 1919, Burrows was translated from Truro to Chichester where he served for ten years until his sudden death in Lambeth Palace on 13 February 1929. William Champion Streatfeild, Burrows' suffragan at the time of Burrows' death, died three days after Burrows' passing.

Burrows was a High Churchman, and while Bishop of Truro, he emphasised the importance of the services of the Book of Common Prayer; a book of services for special occasions which he compiled and authorised was entirely based on the contents of the prayer book and on Scripture. He was chair of the Church of England's Central Advisory Council of Training for the Ministry from 1916-1927.

Church of England titles
Preceded by John Diggle	Archdeacon of Birmingham; 1904–1912	Succeeded by Mansfield Owen
Preceded by Charles Stubbs	Bishop of Truro; 1912–1919	Succeeded by Guy Warman
Preceded by Charles Ridgeway	Bishop of Chichester; 1919–1929	Succeeded by George Bell
