= Charles Hopton =

English clergyman (1861-1946)

Charles Ernest Hopton (13 February 1861 – 20 December 1946) was Archdeacon of Birmingham from 1915 to 1944.

Hopton was born in 1861, educated at Clifton College, Hereford Cathedral School and St John’s College, Cambridge and ordained in 1885. After curacies in Selly Oak and Redditch he was Vicar of Stretton Grandison with Ashperton; St Stephen’s, Worcester; and then Moseley before his Archdeacon’s appointment.

Church of England titles
Preceded by Charles Mansfield Owen	Archdeacon of Birmingham; 1915–1944	Succeeded by Geoffrey Francis Allen
