= Football in Cyprus =

- Country: Cyprus
- Governing body: Cyprus Football Association
- National teams: Men's national team Women's national team

National competitions
- FIFA World Cup; UEFA European Championship; UEFA Nations League

Club competitions
- League: Cypriot First Division; Cypriot Second Division; Cypriot Third Division; STOK Elite Division; Cup: Cypriot Cup; Cypriot Super Cup; Cypriot Cup for lower divisions

International competitions
- UEFA Champions League; UEFA Europa League; UEFA Conference League; UEFA Super Cup; FIFA Club World Cup; FIFA Intercontinental Cup

Football is Cyprus's most popular sport.

Short of some sporadic surprise wins versus higher-ranked countries, mostly on home soil, the national team has not enjoyed any success of note. On the other hand, Cypriot clubs have reached the Champions League group stage three times in recent years; that has made Cyprus the smallest sovereign state (in terms of both of area and population) to have been represented in the main phase of Europe's most prestigious club tournament, since the introduction of the group stage in 1992.

APOEL FC has made history by being the first and only Cypriot team to reach the quarter-finals of the UEFA Champions League (in 2012), and the round of 16 of the Europa League (in 2017). They have also won the domestic league and cup more times than any other Cypriot club (28 and 21 times respectively). APOEL's performances, in both domestic and European competitions, have made it the most successful club in Cyprus.

Founded in 1911, Anorthosis Famagusta is the oldest Cypriot football club. Omonia is the most popular club in Cyprus, .

== History ==
Football was introduced to Cyprus early in the 20th century by the British (Canon Frank Darvall Newham, founder of The English School, Nicosia). Initially played in the island's schools, it proved hugely popular and a number of clubs were duly formed. Football clubs played friendly games only and the first unofficial island-wide league was organised in 1932.

The rivalry between teams that support different political parties has grown intense over the decades and the matches result in bloody conflicts between the fans. The fans take extreme pride in their team not only because the history of their team but because the connection their political party has with their team. The more hardcore right wing fans waved fascist symbols during matche.s whereas the hardcore left wing fans waved symbols associated with communism. AC Omonia's fans in the 2011–2012 season made an enormous choreography of the hammer and sickle, while Anorthosis Famagusta FC and others have shown their love for their Turkish-occupied home city of Famagusta and their Greek-Cypriot heritage. The two teams mentioned above have an often violent rivalry, resulting in injuries to fans. Another team associated with politics is APOEL. the rivals of Omonia. APOEL's fans have strong connections with the nationalist party.

=== Cyprus Football Association ===
As football became established, the clubs were united in agreeing that an official body was needed to regulate the sport. In September 1934, the Cyprus Football Association (CFA) was formed and matches were soon being played on an official basis. The association became a FIFA member in 1948 and an UEFA member in 1962.

=== Pancyprian Footballers Association ===
Until the mid-1980s, footballers in Cyprus did not have any organisation or union that promoted their interests. Players were usually paid small wages and needed to have other jobs in order to support themselves and their families. On December 12, 1987 the Pancyprian Footballers Association (Greek: Παγκύπριος Σύνδεσμος Ποδοσφαιριστών) was created. On February 25, 1997, the PFA became a FIFPro member.

There are 52,403 (19,203 registered) players and 108 football clubs in Cyprus.

== League system ==
The governing body of football in Cyprus is the Cyprus Football Association. The first official league was organised in 1934. The Cyprus Football Association oversees the organization of:

- Leagues:
  - Cypriot First Division
  - Cypriot Second Division
  - Cypriot Third Division
  - STOK Elite Division
- Cup tournaments:
  - Cypriot Cup
  - Cypriot Super Cup
  - Cypriot Cup for lower divisions
- National teams:
  - Cyprus national football team
  - Cyprus national under-21 football team

== Teams ==
=== Domestic Doubles ===
In Cyprus five teams have won the Domestic Double (Cypriot First Division & Cypriot Cup).

Club	Number	Seasons
APOEL	6	1936–37, 1946–47, 1972–73, 1995–96, 2013–14, 2014–15
Omonia	5	1971–72, 1973–74, 1980–81, 1981–82, 1982–83
Anorthosis Famagusta	2	1961–62, 1997–98
AEK Larnaca	2	1944–45, 1945–46
Trust	1	1934–35

== National team ==
The Cypriot national team has yet to qualify for a major FIFA or UEFA competition.

Cyprus' highest FIFA ranking (43rd) came in October 2010. Cyprus is currently ranked 111th (as of June 2023).

== Attendances ==
The average attendance per top-flight football league season and the club with the highest average attendance:

Season	League average	Best club	Best club average
2019–20	2,594	Omonoia	8,824
2018–19	1,701	APOEL	4,414
2017–18	2,237	Omonoia	5,680
2016–17	2,249	APOEL	7,126
2015–16	2,542	APOEL	7,873
2014–15	2,852	Omonoia	8,168
2013–14	2,592	APOEL	7,895
2012–13	2,928	APOEL	8,905
2011–12	2,896	APOEL	7,576
2010–11	3,067	APOEL	10,109
2009–10	3,088	Omonoia	10,373

== See also ==
- Cypriot football clubs in European competitions
