= John Duncan (English archdeacon) =

Archdeacon of Birmingham

The Ven. John Finch Duncan (born 9 September 1933) was the Archdeacon of Birmingham from 1985 to 2001.

Duncan was educated at Queen Elizabeth Grammar School, Wakefield; University College, Oxford; and Ripon College Cuddesdon. He was ordained in 1960 and was a Curate at St John, South Bank, Middlesbrough from 1959 to 1961; then a Novice with the Society of St Francis. He was a Curate at St Peter, Birmingham from 1962 to 1965; Chaplain at the University of Birmingham from 1965 to 1976; and Vicar of All Saints, Kings Heath from 1976 to 1985.

Church of England titles
Preceded by Gerald Hollis	Archdeacon of Birmingham; 1985 –2001	Succeeded by Hayward Osborne
