= Barrow upon Soar =

Village in Leicestershire, England

Coordinates: 52°45′06″N 1°09′00″W

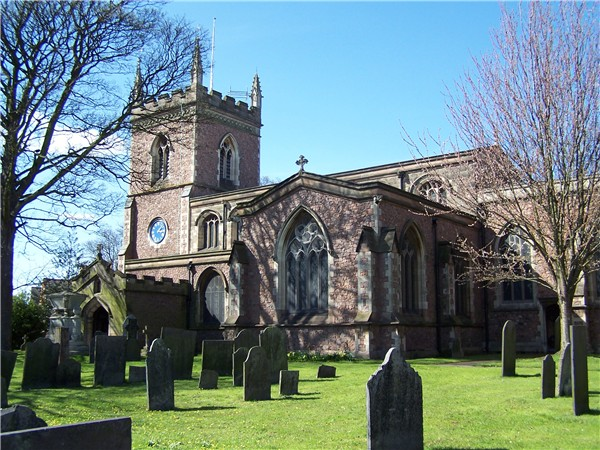
- Holy Trinity Church, Barrow upon Soar

- Location within Leicestershire
- Population: 5,856
- OS grid reference: SK575176
- District: Charnwood
- Ceremonial county: Leicestershire
- Region: East Midlands
- Country: England
- Sovereign state: United Kingdom
- Post town: LOUGHBOROUGH
- Postcode district: LE12
- Dialling code: 01509
- Police: Leicestershire
- Fire: Leicestershire
- Ambulance: East Midlands
- UK Parliament: Loughborough

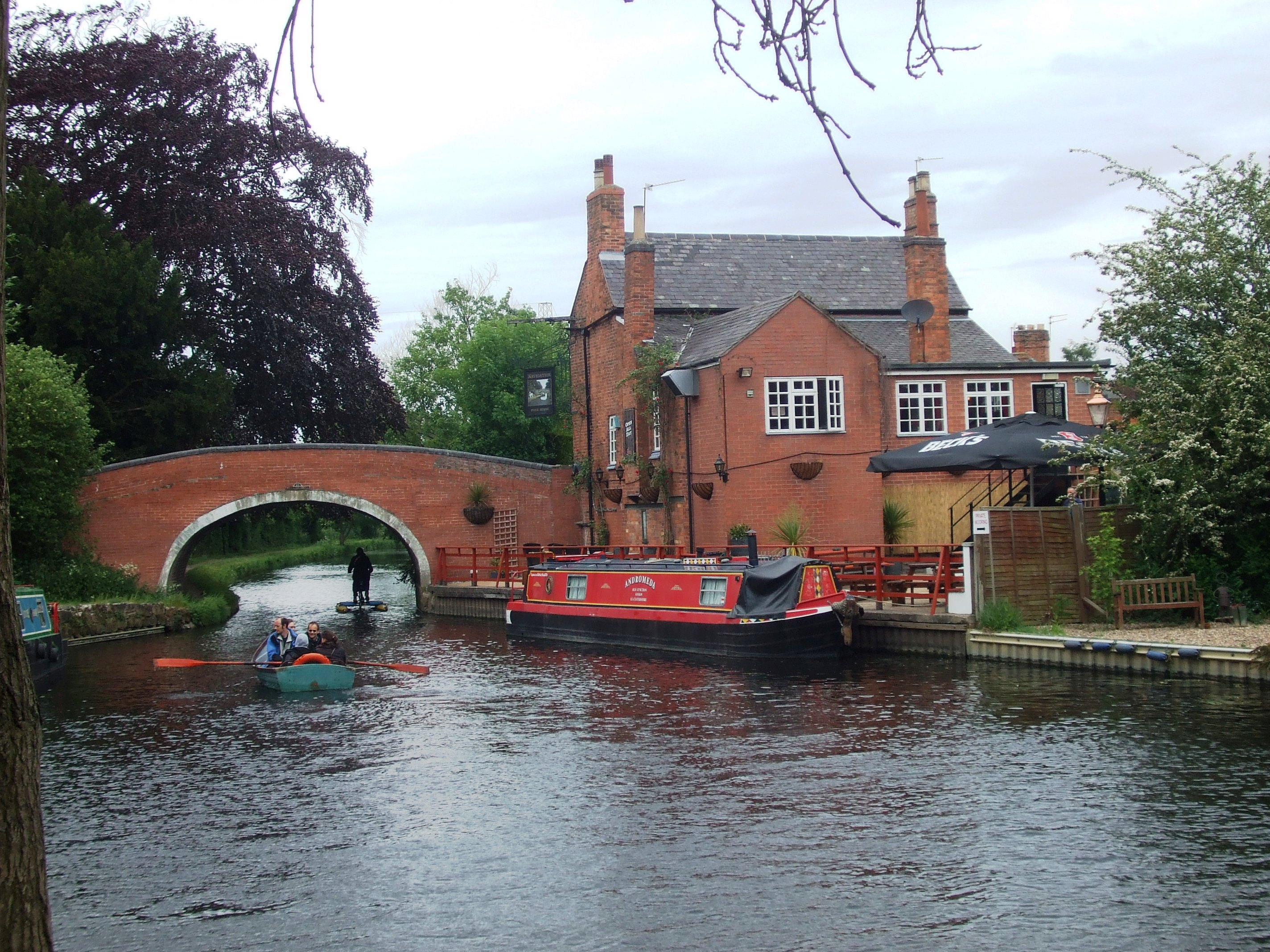
Bridge over the River Soar next to the Navigation

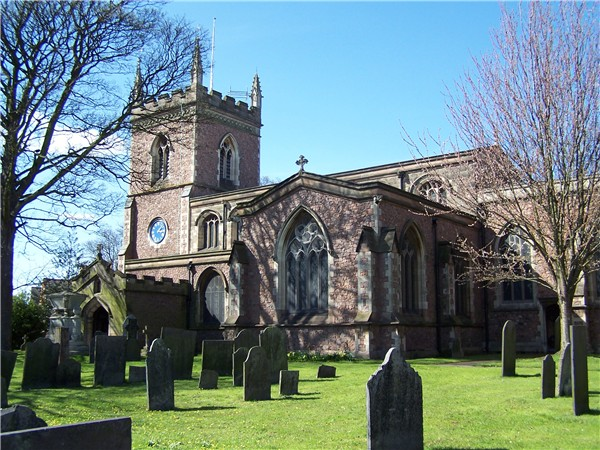
Barrow upon Soar parish church

Interior view of the church of the Holy Trinity

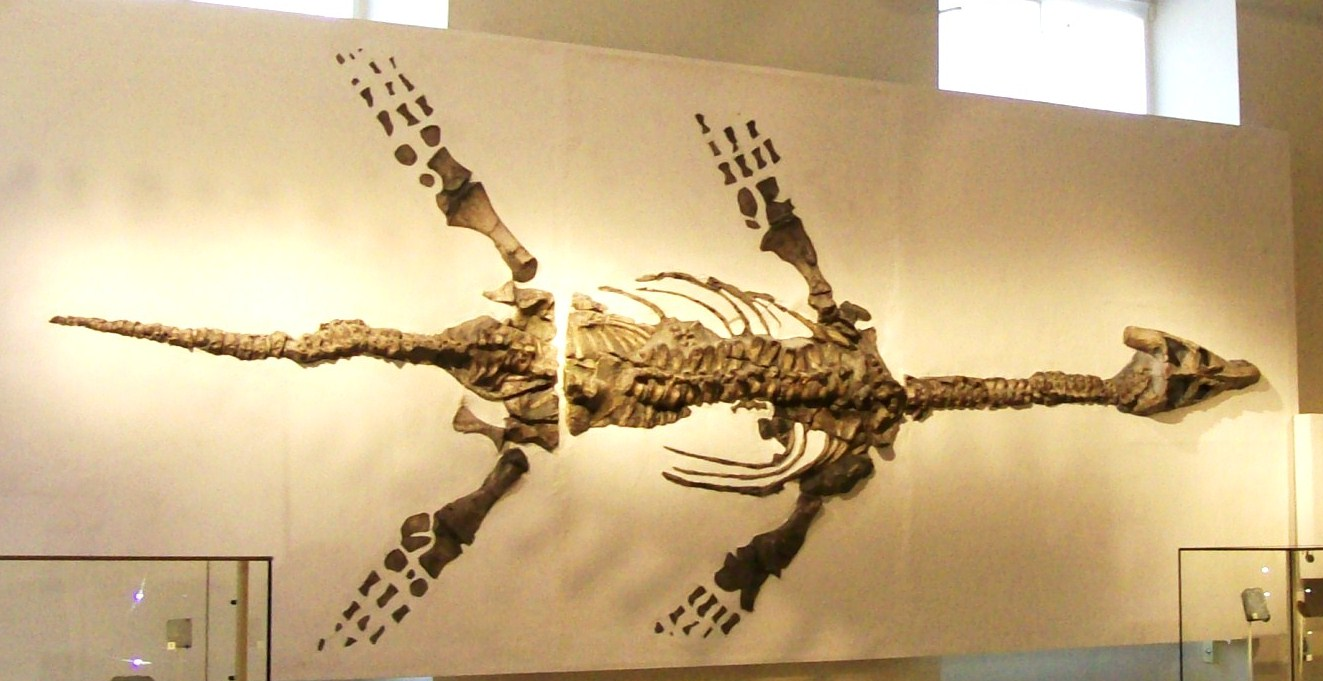
The "Barrow Kipper" plesiosaur skeleton at the Leicester Museum & Art Gallery

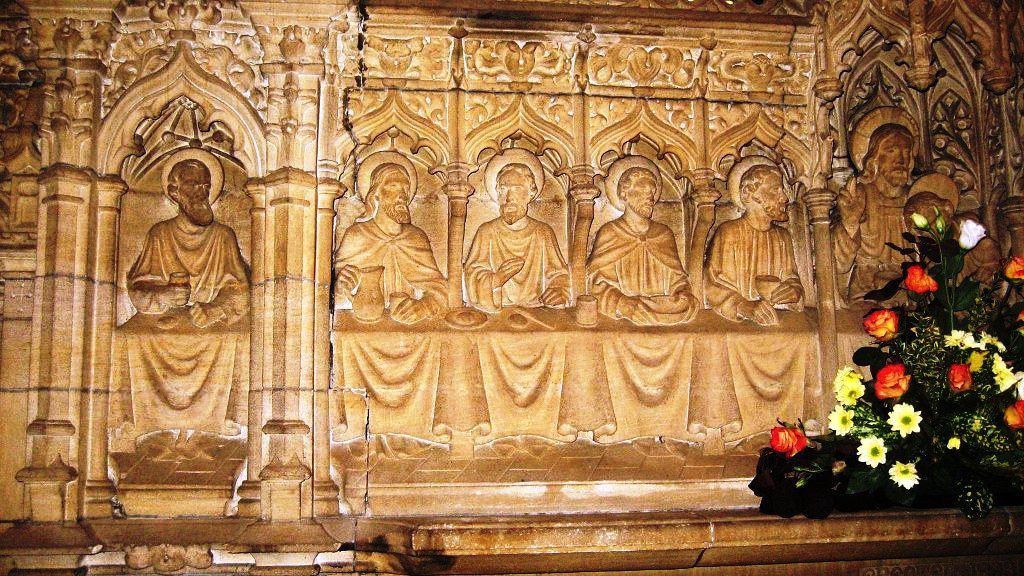
Reredos in the parish church by Nathaniel Hitch

Barrow upon Soar is a large village in northern Leicestershire, in the Soar Valley between Leicester and Loughborough, with a population at the 2011 census of 5,856.

In the March 2021 census, it registered a population of 6,825.

== Geography ==
Barrow lies on the east bank of the River Soar, where the river is joined by the Fishpool Brook. British Gypsum has a plant at Barrow, and the parish is adjacent to the Swithland Reservoir.

Barrow upon Soar is part of the local government district of Charnwood.

== Transport ==
=== Road ===
The village is near the A6 Road from Quorn.

=== Rail ===
Barrow-upon-Soar railway station is situated on the Midland Main Line, and East Midlands Railway trains stop there Monday to Saturday, there is no Sunday service.

The Mountsorrel Railway, carrying granite from the Mountsorrel quarries, used to run to here; the line from Mountsorrel is still followed by a mineral conveyor to Barrow, where quarry rock is sorted for distribution.

=== Bus ===
The village currently has 1 bus service to Leicester, which is route 2X operated by Central Connect (formerly Vectare), and operates one bus from Loughbrough to Leicester in the morning, then 3 buses from Leicester to Loughbrough in the evening. Barrow is also served by the Kinchbus 2 service that runs between Sileby and Loughborough and Centrebus service 27 between Loughborough and Thurmaston.

== History ==
The village's name means 'grove situated on the River Soar'.

White's History, Gazetteer and Directory of the Counties of Leicester and Rutland (1877) says:

Barrow-upon-Soar is a parish and large village, which gives its name to a Poor Law Union district, and a county court district. It has for ages been celebrated for its excellent limestone, and is pleasantly situated on the east side of the navigable River Soar, and on both sides of the Midland Railway on which it has a station 2 miles N. of Mount Sorrel, 3 miles S.E. of Loughborough, and 9 miles N. of Leicester. Barrow township comprises about 2510 acres of land and had 1099 inhabitants in 1801, 1638 in 1831, 1800 in 1861, and 1973 in 1871, the increase of the last ten years being 'attributed to the opening of the limeworks.' It is in East Goscote Hundred, but its parish comprises also the townships of Mount Sorrel North-end, Quorndon, and Woodhouse, all of which are in West Goscote Hundred. The area of the whole parish is about 9160 acres, and it had 5857 inhabitants in 1871.

The village is known for a plesiosaur that was excavated here in 1851. The specimen of Atychodracon megacephalus, found in a lime pit outside the village, was nicknamed the "Barrow Kipper". At the centre of the village is a roundabout with a sign depicting its skeleton. The skeleton is now on display at the Leicester Museum & Art Gallery, with a full-size replica at Charnwood Museum in Loughborough. The village's football club has the skeleton on its badge.

== Twinning ==
Barrow upon Soar is twinned with Marans, Charente-Maritime, in France.

== Notable people ==
In chronological order

- Tobias Rustat (1608–1694), courtier and philanthropist
- William Beveridge (1637–1708), Bishop of St Asaph, was born at Barrow, of which his grandfather, father, and brother were all vicars.
- Ralph Heathcote (1721–1795), clergyman and author, was born at Barrow, where his father was curate.
- John Bradshaw (1812–1880), clergyman and cricketer, was born here.
- Lieutenant-General Edward Chippindall (1827–1902), British Army officer and Aide-de-camp to Queen Victoria, lived in Barrow upon Soar for the last twenty years of his life and was a member of the Quorn Hunt.
- Henry Melvill Gwatkin (1844–1916), church historian, was born at Barrow, a son of the Rev. Richard Gwatkin.
- Henry Pottinger Stephens (1851–1903), a playwright and journalist, was from Barrow
- Frank Darvall Newham (1864–1946), a schoolmaster and clergyman who spent most of his career in Cyprus, was from Barrow upon Soar.
- Harold Wright (1884–1915), a cricketer, was born in Barrow and died of wounds during the First World War.
- John Stafford Curtis (1887–1972), cricketer, was a native of the village.
- Sir Franklin Gimson, Governor of Singapore, was born in Barrow in 1890, the son of a local clergyman.
- Alfred Matts (1893–1970), cricketer, was a native of Barrow
- Air Vice-Marshal Johnnie Johnson (1915–2001), a Second World War flying ace, was born here.
- Peter Preston (1938–2018), editor of The Guardian from 1975 to 1995, was born here, the son of a greengrocer,
- Paul Munden (born 1938), cricketer, was born at Barrow upon Soar.
- Brian Reffin Smith (born 1946), an artist and writer, attended the Humphrey Perkins School in Barrow.
- Mick Bates (born 1947), a Welsh Assembly member, taught at the Humphrey Perkins School.
- Martin Schepens, a cricketer, was born in Barrow in 1955.
- Sally Barker (born 1959), singer songwriter, of The Poozies, is from Barrow.

== Sport ==
The village has an association football club, Barrow Town FC. The club plays its home games at Riverside Park and currently competes in the East Midlands Counties Football League, the 10th tier of English football.
