= Tim Hollis =

British police officer

Timothy Stancliffe Hollis, CBE, QPM is a retired British police officer who was Chief Constable of Humberside Police and Vice-President of the Association of Chief Police Officers. Before joining the police, he served in the British Army as an officer of the Parachute Regiment.

== Early life ==
Born and bred in South Yorkshire. Son of the late Ven. Gerald Hollis (Vicar of Rotherham 1970–74 and Archdeacon of Birmingham 1974–84) and Doreen E. Hollis. Hollis undertook Voluntary Service Overseas in Ghana during his gap year before university. He graduated from the University of Bristol.

== Career ==
=== Military service ===
Hollis served in the British Army. For three years, while holding a short service commission, he was an officer in the Parachute Regiment. He was commissioned on 6 October 1974 as a second lieutenant. He was given the service number 498544. It was gazetted on 15 April 1975, that his commission had been confirmed and he was given seniority in the rank of second lieutenant from 6 April 1971. He was also promoted to lieutenant back dated to 6 October 1974 with seniority from 6 April 1973.

He was transferred to the Regular Army Reserve of Officers of 6 October 1977, thereby ending his active service. He ceased to belong to the Regular Army Reserve of Officers on 6 October 1982, thereby ending the period where he had been liable for call-up.

=== Police career ===
Hollis joined the Metropolitan Police Service in 1977. Latterly he was Chief Inspector (Operations) at Notting Hill. In 1991, he transferred to Sussex Police (Brighton) on promotion to Superintendent subsequently being promoted Chief Superintendent.

In 1994, he was appointed Assistant Chief Constable Crime and Operations of South Yorkshire Police. His national ACPO responsibilities included Public Order and football. He oversaw the British Policing contingent for World Cup, France 1998 and Euro 2000 in Belgium/Netherlands.

In 2002, he was appointed the Assistant Inspector (Crime and Operations) of Her Majesty's Inspectorate of Constabulary for three years. He was appointed Chief Constable of Humberside Police in April 2005. He retired from the post and the police in April 2013.

Hollis was the ACPO lead for Drugs 2006–2012.

In 2008, he was appointed Vice-President of the Association of Chief Police Officers and had oversight of the Police National Intelligence and Coordination Centre (PNICC). In 2009, he was Acting President of the ACPO until Hugh Orde took up the post in August of that year. Given his PNICC role, Hollis oversaw the national police response to the disorders of Summer 2011 and assisted in co-ordinating the national policing input to the 2012 Olympics.

== Later life ==
On 31 July 2012, Hollis was appointed Honorary Colonel of the Humberside and South Yorkshire Army Cadet Force in succession to Lord Lingfield. Hollis studied for a Master of Arts degree in Modern History at Sheffield University. He was awarded a Masters with Merit dated 22 October 2014.

== Honours ==
In the 2000 New Year Honours, Hollis was awarded the Queen's Police Medal (QPM). He was appointed Commander of the Order of the British Empire (CBE) 'for services to the Police' in the 2010 New Year Honours.

Police appointments
Preceded by David Westwood	Chief Constable of Humberside Police; 2005–2013	Succeeded by Justine Curran
