= Flesh Hovel Lane =

Road in Quorn, Leicestershire, England

- Interactive map of Flesh Hovel Lane
- Location: Quorn, Leicestershire, England
- Postal code: LE12 8FE
- Coordinates: 52.7515076°N 1.1655523°W

Flesh Hovel Lane is a road in Quorn, Leicestershire, England.

Its name originates from the time of the Quorn Hunt, where horses that were no longer fit for purpose were taken to slaughter and hung at the abattoir situated on Flesh Hovel Lane. The remains of the horses were then used to feed the dogs of the hunt.
