= George Bell (bishop) =

British Anglican bishop and theologian (1883–1958)

The Right Reverend George Bell
- Bishop of Chichester
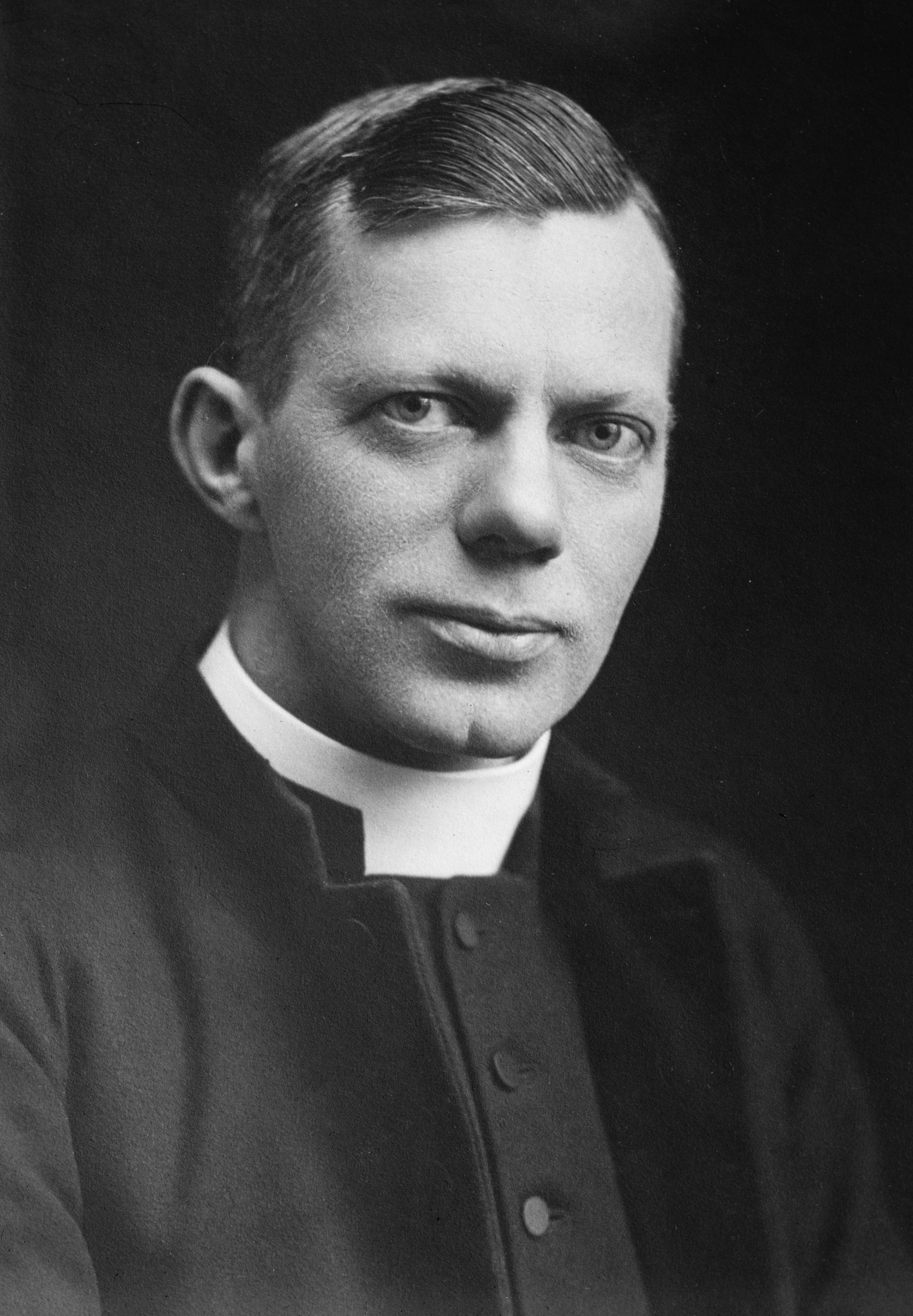
- Bell in 1910
- Province: Canterbury
- Diocese: Chichester
- Installed: 11 June 1929
- Term ended: 3 October 1958
- Predecessor: Winfrid Burrows
- Successor: Roger Wilson
- Other posts: Dean of Canterbury (1925–1929); Member, House of Lords (1937–1958)

Orders
- Ordination: 1907 (deacon)
- Consecration: c. 1929

Personal details
- Born: 4 February 1883 Hayling Island, Hampshire, England
- Died: 3 October 1958 (aged 75)
- Buried: Chichester Cathedral
- Denomination: Anglican
- Spouse: Henrietta Livingstone (m. 1918)
- Education: Christ Church, Oxford; Wells Theological College

Sainthood
- Feast day: 3 October
- Venerated in: Church of England

George Kennedy Allen Bell (4 February 1883 – 3 October 1958) was a British Anglican bishop and theologian. He served as Dean of Canterbury from 1925 to 1929 and Bishop of Chichester from 1929 until his death. He was also a member of the House of Lords and a pioneer of the ecumenical movement.

== Early life and career ==
Bell was born in Hayling Island, Hampshire, as the eldest child of Sarah Georgina Megaw and her husband James Allen Bell (the vicar of the island and later a canon at Norwich Cathedral). His sister Margorie married Cecil Wood, the Bishop of Melanesia from 1912 to 1919.

He was elected as a Queen's Scholar at Westminster School in 1896. From there he was elected to a scholarship at Christ Church, Oxford, where he gained a first in Classical Moderations in 1903 and a second in Literae Humaniores ('Greats') in 1905. He won the Newdigate Prize for English verse in 1904 for his poem, "Delphi".

After Oxford he attended Wells Theological College, where he was first influenced by ecumenism. He was ordained deacon at Ripon Cathedral in 1907. He went on to work as a curate for three years in the industrial slums of Leeds. His role there was the Christian mission to industrial workers, a third of whom were Indians and Africans from the British Empire. During his time there he learned much from the Methodists, whose connection between personal creed and social engagement he saw as an example to the Church of England.

Between 1910 and 1914, Bell returned to Christ Church, Oxford, serving as a student minister and lecturer in Classics and English, and was a fellow from 1911. He was also socially engaged as one of the founders of a cooperative for students and university members and sitting on the board of settlements and worker-development through the Workers' Educational Association (WEA).

Bell's early career was shaped by his appointment in 1914 as chaplain to Archbishop Randall Davidson, one of the key figures in twentieth century church history. Bell subsequently wrote the standard biography of Davidson. Bell received a special commission for international and inter-denominational relations. In this office he ensured in 1915 that the Lutheran Indians be allowed to continue the work of the Leipzig – and the Goßner missions in Chota Nagpur in India, after the missions' German missionaries had been interned. Until the end of the First World War, he also worked for the Order of Saint John, a supra-confessional group working to help those orphaned by the war and – together with the Swedish Lutheran archbishop Nathan Söderblom, one of his closest lifelong friends – for the exchange of prisoners of war. In this work, he came to see internal Protestant divisions as more and more insignificant.

== Inter-war years ==
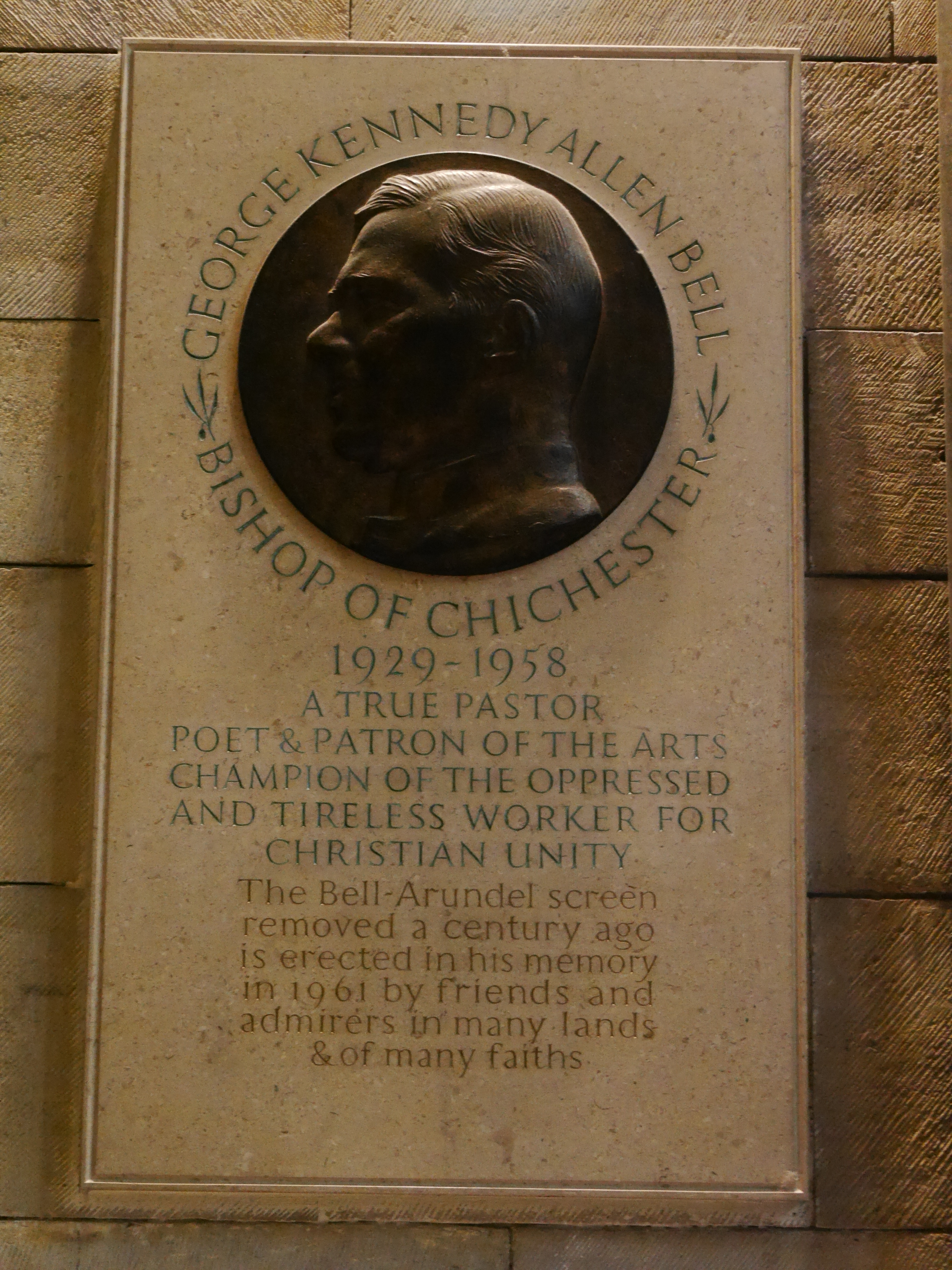
Memorial, Chichester Cathedral

After the war, Bell became an initiator and promoter of the still-young ecumenical movement. In 1919, at the first postwar meeting of the World Council of Churches in the Netherlands, he successfully encouraged the establishment of a commission for religious and national minorities. At the world churches conference in Stockholm in 1925, he helped in the realisation of the "ecumenical advice for practical Christianity (Life and Work)".

External images
- George Bell as Dean of Canterbury Cathedral.
- George Bell as Bishop of Chichester.

From 1925 to 1929, Bell was Dean of Canterbury. During this time, he initiated the Canterbury Festival of the arts, with guest artists such as John Masefield, Gustav Holst, Dorothy L. Sayers and T. S. Eliot (whose 1935 drama Murder in the Cathedral was commissioned by Bell for the festival). Later Bell also received Mahatma Gandhi at Canterbury.

In 1929 Bell was appointed Bishop of Chichester. In this role he organised links between his diocese and of workers affected by the Great Depression. He also took part in the meetings of the National Union of Public Employees, where he was welcomed as "brother Bell".

=== Ally of the Confessing Church ===
From 1932 to 1934 he was the president of "Life and Work" at the ecumenical council in Geneva, at whose Berlin conference at the start of February 1933 he witnessed the Nazis' seizure of power at first hand.

After 1933, Bell became the most important international ally of the Confessing Church in Germany. In April 1933 he publicly expressed the international church's worries over the beginnings of the Nazis' antisemitic campaign in Germany, and in September that year carried a resolution protesting against the "Aryan paragraph" and its acceptance by parts of the German Evangelical Church (Deutsche Evangelische Kirche, or DEK). In November 1933 he first met Dietrich Bonhoeffer, who was in London for two years as representative of the foreign churches – the two became close friends, and Bonhoeffer often informed Bell of what was going on in Germany. Bell then made this information (and thus what was really happening in Germany) known to the public of Europe and America, for example through letters to The Times.

On 1 June 1934 he signed the Barmen Declaration, the foundational manifesto of the Confessing Church – it proclaimed that Christian belief and National Socialism were incompatible, and condemned pro-Nazi German Christianity as "false teaching", or heresy. Bell reported on 6 June to a gathering of the bishops of the Church of England and clarified the difference between confessing and rejecting, and the separation between a lawful and an illegitimate calling on Jesus Christ. This was the first reaction to the declaration from the international church.

From 1934, Bell functioned as a president of "Life and Work", when Bonhoeffer and Karl Koch as praeses of the synod of the old-Prussian ecclesiastical province of Westphalia were invited as representatives of the Confessing Church to the world ecumenical conference in Fanø. As a selected youth secretary, Bonhoeffer was responsible for the related world youth conference. At one morning service, he addressed world Christianity as an "ecumenical council" and called on it to rise against the threatened war. On Bell's suggestion and against protests from the representatives of the pro-Nazi DEK, the world conference expressed solidarity with the Confessing Church and its struggle and again exposed the Nazis' policies, including the concentration camps.

In 1936, Bell received the chair of the International Christian Committee for German Refugees, and in that role he especially supported Jewish Christians, who at that time were supported by neither Jewish nor Christian organizations. In order to help them to emigrate, he dispatched his sister-in-law Laura Livingstone to Berlin and Hamburg and occasionally let exiles live in his own home. In the same year, he printed a prayer in his diocesan newsletter for Jewish and "non-Aryan" Christians:

Pray for the Jews in Stepney, and Whitechapel, and Bethnal Green [where exiles were often accommodated]; pray for the German Jews; for all who suffer pain, who suffer shame, on account of their race. Pray for those who have a Jewish parent or grandparent and are Christian by belief...

Bell used his authority as a leader in the Ecumenical Movement and from 1938 as Lord Spiritual to influence public opinion in Britain and the Nazi authorities in Berlin, and back those persecuted by the Nazi regime. His public support is said to have contributed to Pastor Martin Niemöller's survival by making his imprisonment in Sachsenhausen in February 1938 (and later in Dachau) widely known in the British press and branded as an example of the Nazi regime's persecution of the church. Thus Hitler backed off from Niemöller's planned execution in 1938.

In the winter of 1938 and 1939 he helped 90 persons, mainly pastors' families (e.g. Hans Ehrenberg from the Christuskirche at Bochum), to emigrate from Germany to Great Britain who were in danger from the regime and the 'official' church because they had Jewish ancestors or were opponents of the Nazi regime.

== Second World War ==
During the war, Bell was involved in helping not only displaced persons and refugees who had fled the continent to England, but also interned Germans and British conscientious objectors. In 1940 he met with ecumenical friends in the Netherlands to unite the churches ready for a joint peace initiative after victory over Nazi Germany had been won. During the 1930s and 1940s, Bell encouraged engagement between the church and the arts. This included supporting the creation of murals by the German refugee and artist Hans Feibusch at St Elisabeth's Eastbourne and Bloomsbury Group members Vanessa Bell and Duncan Grant at Berwick, East Sussex.

=== Opponent of area bombing ===
During the Second World War, Bell repeatedly condemned the Allied practice of area bombing. As a member of the House of Lords, he was a consistent parliamentary critic of area bombing along with Richard Stokes and Alfred Salter, Labour Party Members of Parliament in the House of Commons.

Even as early as 1939, he stated that the church should not be allowed to become simply a spiritual help to the state, but instead should be an advocate of peaceful international relations and make a stand against expulsion, enslavement and the destruction of morality. It should not be allowed to abandon these principles, ever ready to criticise retaliatory attacks or the bombing of civilian populations. He also urged the European churches to remain critical of their own countries' ways of waging war. In November 1939 he published an article stating that the church in wartime should not hesitate

to condemn the infliction of reprisals, or the bombing of civilian populations, by the military forces of its own nation. It should set itself against the propaganda of lies and hatred. It should be ready to encourage the resumption of friendly relations with the enemy nation. It should set its face against any war of extermination or enslavement, and any measures directly aimed to destroy the morale of a population.

In 1941 in a letter to The Times, he called the bombing of unarmed women and children "barbarian" which would destroy the just cause for the war, thus openly criticising the Prime Minister's advocacy of such a bombing strategy. On 14 February 1943 – two years ahead of the Dresden raids – he urged the House of Lords to resist the War Cabinet's decision for area bombing, stating that it called into question all the humane and democratic values for which Britain had gone to war. In 1944, during debate, he again demanded the House of Lords to stop British area bombing of German cities such as Hamburg and Berlin as a disproportionate and illegal "policy of annihilation" and a crime against humanity, asking:

How can the War Cabinet fail to see that this progressive devastation of cities is threatening the roots of civilization?

He did not have the support of senior bishops. The Archbishop of York replied to him in the House of Lords: "it is a lesser evil to bomb the war-loving Germans than to sacrifice the lives of our fellow countrymen..., or to delay the delivery of many now held in slavery".

=== Supporter of the German resistance ===
As a close friend of the German pastor Dietrich Bonhoeffer Bell knew precise details of German plans to assassinate Adolf Hitler. On 1 June 1942, Bell met Bonhoeffer in neutral Sweden, where the latter was acting as a secret courier for information on the German resistance. This information included the names of the participants from the armed forces in the planned assassination attempt on Hitler and coup against the Nazi regime.

On his return, Bell passed this information on the German resistance movement on to Anthony Eden and tried to gain British government support for them. Bell also asked Eden, at the conspirators' request "to emphatically and publicly explain that the British government and its allies have no wish to enslave Germany, but only to remove Hitler, Himmler and their accessories" – in other words, to make a public declaration that the British would make a distinction between the Nazi regime and German people, so as the conspirators would be able to negotiate an armistice if they were successful. Yet after a month-long silence, Bell received a rough rebuttal, for the allies had concluded at the Casablanca Conference to wage war until the unconditional surrender of Germany and to initiate area bombing. Such moves made Bell unpopular in some quarters. Noël Coward's 1943 song "Don't Let's Be Beastly to the Germans", which expressed hostility to any distinction between the Germans and the Nazis, commented "We might send [the Germans] out some Bishops as a form of lease and lend".

After the failure of the first attempt on Hitler's life and the arrest of some of the conspirators, Bell in vain tried to bring about a change in government attitudes to the German resistance. When the final failure came on 20 July 1944, Bell harshly criticised the British government as having made the failure a foregone conclusion and reproached Eden for not sending help to the plotters in time, despite having full knowledge of the plot.

=== Considered as Archbishop of Canterbury ===
In 1944 the Archbishop of Canterbury, William Temple, died after only two years in the post. Bell was considered a strong candidate to succeed him, but Geoffrey Fisher, Bishop of London was appointed. Bishops of the Church of England at the time were chosen, ultimately, by the British prime minister and it is known that Winston Churchill strongly disapproved of Bell's speeches against bombing. It has been asserted that Bell would otherwise have been appointed, but this is debatable; there is evidence that Temple had thought Fisher a likely successor anyway. Bell's high posthumous reputation may have coloured later opinion. For example, Archbishop Rowan Williams said in 2008 that he thought Bell would have made a better Archbishop of Canterbury than Fisher.

== Post-war ==
=== War crimes trials ===
Bell was opposed to the Nazi regime, but subscribed to an understanding of National Socialism that saw the Nazi regime as a freakish aberration from the norms of Western civilization, such that the traditional elites could not have been in any way involved in Nazi crimes. Hence when in 1949 the British government brought Field Marshal Erich von Manstein to trial for war crimes committed on the Eastern Front, Bell emerged as one of Manstein's leading champions, stating that it was self-evident that a German Army officer like Manstein could not possibly be a war criminal. For Bell, bringing to trial members of traditional elites in Germany like members of the officer corps and diplomatic corps was morally wrong as Bell simply could not accept that these men had been involved in Nazi crimes. Bell was part of an informal group headed by Lord Hankey who strongly opposed war crimes trials of German and Japanese leaders, and campaigned very energetically for the end of war crimes trials and for freedom for those convicted of war crimes like Manstein. The British historian Tom Lawson wrote that Bell was principally concerned with the situation of the Confessing Church in Germany, not with the persecution of the German Jewish community in the 1930s which escalated into a campaign of genocide against all European Jews in the 1940s. Like his ally and friend Pastor Martin Niemöller, what Bell objected to was not the antisemitism of the Nazi regime per se, but rather the attempt to apply the Aryan Paragraph to those German Jews who had converted to Christianity. Lawson argued that this understanding of Nazism as more of an anti-Christian movement than an anti-Jewish movement meant that Anglican clergy like Bell had only a "superficial" understanding of the Holocaust, which was not a major concern for him.

=== Visionary for a reconciled Europe ===
A supporter of Protestant ecumenism, Bell hoped after the war for a Europe united by common Christian values. Bell saw the Soviet Union as the principal enemy of Europe, which for him was an "Asian" nation that was not part of the "European family", calling for an Anglo-German alliance to be the cornerstone of a post-war Europe.

=== Critic of expulsions ===
Bell was also one of the first British bishops to protest against the inhumane treatment of approximately 14 million Silesian, Pomeranian, East Prussian and Sudeten Germans expelled from their homes in Eastern Europe. Around 15 August 1945, he was a one of a number of signatories supporting the Save Europe Now campaign to a letter in The Spectator advocating for a campaign for British people to give some of their rations for the Germans suffering from acute food shortages. He also signed an open letter supporting the Save Europe Now campaign in March 1946.

=== Nuclear disarmament and the Cold War ===
In the 1950s Bell opposed the atomic arms race and supported many Christian initiatives of the time opposed to the Cold War. In the last years of his life, he became acquainted with Giovanni Montini in Milan through his ecumenical contacts, who in 1963 became Pope Paul VI and brought the Second Vatican Council to its conclusion.

== Child abuse allegations ==
In 1995, 37 years after Bell's death, a complaint was made to the then Bishop of Chichester, Eric Kemp, alleging that Bell had sexually abused a girl during the 1940s and 1950s. The complaint was not passed on to police until a second complaint was made to the office of Justin Welby, the Archbishop of Canterbury, in 2013, 18 years after the first complaint had been made and 55 years after Bell's death. This was a time of intense public concern over sexual abuse within the Church of England and especially in Chichester Diocese.

In September 2015 the diocese paid compensation to the woman and Martin Warner, the Bishop of Chichester, issued a formal apology to her the following month. This led to a major controversy, as people who respected Bell's legacy dismissed the claims as untenable and considered the church's apparent acceptance of them to be unjust. Due to the controversy, in February 2016 the woman spoke publicly for the first time, under the pseudonym "Carol", in an interview with the Brighton Argus, saying that she was sexually abused from the age of five until her family moved away when she was nine.

In June 2016 the Church of England announced that it would hold an independent review of the procedure used to investigate the church's handling of the allegations (not the truth of the allegations themselves) and in November it announced that Lord Carlile QC would be the reviewer. Carlile submitted his report to the Church of England in mid-October and on 15 December 2017 the church published it.

Carlile found that "there was a rush to judgment: The church, feeling it should be both supportive of the complainant and transparent in its dealings, failed to engage in a process which would also give proper consideration to the rights of the bishop." The report also found that the available evidence did not suggest there would have been "a realistic prospect of conviction" in court, the standard that prosecutors in England and Wales use in deciding whether to pursue a case.

The Church of England released a statement with the report, in which it apologised to Bell's relatives for the way it had investigated child abuse claims made against him, acknowledged the mistakes highlighted by the report, and promised to implement all except one of its recommendations. Archbishop Welby rejected calls to state that the investigation had cleared Bell's name and said that the allegations were handled as a civil matter, not a criminal one.

In late January 2018 the Church of England's national safeguarding team issued a statement saying it had passed 'fresh information' on to Sussex Police that it had recently received concerning Bell. In April 2018, Sussex Police stated that a proportionate investigation had been carried out to clarify the circumstances. As there were no safeguarding issues and Bell had been dead for sixty years, the matter was now closed as far as the police were concerned.

In March 2018, the Independent Inquiry into Child Sexual Abuse began examining the handling of allegations of sexual abuse in the diocese of Chichester, including this matter, which it said would unfold over two years. In January 2019 the church's National Safeguarding Team announced that new allegations by a "range of people", following publication of the Carlile Report, had been reviewed by ecclesiastical lawyer Timothy Briden whose terms of reference did not permit him to investigate the original complaint. He concluded that: "Concentrating exclusively upon the allegations remitted to me, I have decided that they were unfounded." Archbishop Justin Welby apologised for mistakes made after the original allegation while also stating that the original allegation cannot be "ignored or swept under the carpet".

In November 2021, Welby retracted his previous claim that there was a "significant cloud" over Bell's reputation, and announced that a statue of him would be erected on the west front of Canterbury Cathedral.

On 3 October 2023, the date on which Bell is commemorated in the church calendar, the name George Bell House was restored by Chichester Cathedral to the building dedicated to the late Bishop's memory at 4 Canon Lane, which it had removed in 2015. The process of full restitution has been delayed by the failure of the various Church authorities to issue an unequivocal apology not only for the way in which they handled the case but for a continued refusal to admit that there never was a case against him in the first place. Rather, the entire affair may be regarded as an example of overly zealous internal and secretive safeguarding practices within the Church of England, resulting in an immediate presumption of guilt, and the resulting defenstration without due process of the reputation of the individual concerned.

== Veneration ==
Bell is honoured with a commemoration in the Church of England on 3 October.

== Works ==
=== Primary works ===
- "A Brief Sketch of the Church of England", 1929
- "Life of Archbishop Randall Davidson." Biography, 1952 (3rd Edition) London OUP
- "Christianity and World Order", 1940
- "The Background of the Hitler Plot", in: Contemporary Review 10, London 1945
- "The Church and Humanity", 1946 (contains: "The Church's Function in Wartime." November 1939)
- "The Task of the Churches in Germany", 1947
- "Christian Unity: The Anglican Position", 1948
- "The Kingship of Christ: The Story of the World Council of Churches", 1954
- "Die Kirche und die Widerstandsbewegung (Politisch-historische Vorlesungsreihe der Universität Göttingen)", in: Evangelische Theologie (Zeitschrift) 7, 1957.

Edited (together with J. O. Cobham):

- "The Significance of the Barmen Declaration for the Oecumenical Church", London 1943.

=== Secondary works ===
- Franz Hildebrandt (Ed.), 'And other Pastors of thy Flock': a German tribute to the Bishop of Chichester, Cambridge, 1942
- Ronald C. D. Jasper: "George Bell, Bishop of Chichester." Oxford University Press, 1967.
- Kenneth Slack: "George Bell". SCM Book Club 204, 1971
- Eberhard Bethge: "Dietrich Bonhoeffer. Eine Biographie." Christian Kaiser Verlag München, 1978, ISBN 3-459-01182-3
- Jaakko Rusama: "Unity and Compassion. Moral issues in the life and thought of George K.A. Bell." Helsinki 1986. ISBN 951-95207-6-7.
- Annegret Winkler-Nehls / Andreas Nehls: "They find themselves between the upper and the nether millstones". Bischof Bells Nachlass zum Problem nichtarischer Flüchtlinge, 1933–1939. Eine Dokumentation. Beiträge zur Diakoniewissenschaft 152, Heidelberg 1991.
- Edwin Robertson: "Unshakeable Friend. George Bell and the German Churches". London: CCBI 1995. ISBN 0-85169-234-6.
- Andrew Chandler: "Brethren in Adversity. Bishop George Bell, The Church of England and the Crisis of German Protestants, 1933–1939". Woodbridge 1997.
- Stephen A. Garrett: "Ethics and Airpower in World War II. The British Bombing of German Cities." New York 1997
- Paul Foster (Ed.): "Bell of Chichester: A Prophetic Bishop." Otter Memorial Paper No. 17, February 2004, ISBN 0-948765-84-4
- Jeremy Haselock: "George Kennedy Allen Bell, Bishop of Chichester and Pastoral Liturgist." Studia Liturgica Vol 35, 2005.
- Lawson, Tom (2006). The Church of England and the Holocaust : Christianity, memory and Nazism. Woodbridge, UK: Boydell & Brewer. ISBN 1-84383-219-4. OCLC 64966225.
- Peter Raina: "George Bell: The greatest churchman – a portrait in letters." London: Churches Together in Britain and Ireland 2006. ISBN 0-85169-332-6 & ISBN 0-85169-334-2.
- Kenneth Slack: George Bell. S.C.M. Press, 1971. ISBN 0334000939.
- "George Bell, Bishop of Chichester, on the Morality of War". Anglican and Episcopal History 58 (1989): 498–509.
- Peter Webster, 'George Bell, John Masefield and "The Coming of Christ": context and significance', Humanitas. The Journal of the George Bell Institute, 10;2 (2009). Available online in SAS-Space
- Chandler, Andrew (2016). George Bell, Bishop of Chichester: Church, State and Resistance in the Age of Dictatorship. Grand Rapids, MI: Wm. B. Eerdmans Publishing. ISBN 9780802872272. LCCN 2015038505.
- https://www.spartacus-educational.com/GERbellG.htm
- http://www.joric.com/Conspiracy/Bell.htm
- George Bell in the Dictionary of National Biography (subscription required)
- Ruth Hildebrandt Grayson, "Presumption of Guilt: The Church's Flawed Case Against Bishop George Bell", Ekklesia, 2025, with an introduction by Keith Clements

== Sources ==
- Chandler, Andrew; David Hein (2012). Archbishop Fisher, 1945–1961. The Archbishops of Canterbury. London: Routledge. ISBN 978-1-4094-1233-5.

Church of England titles
Preceded by Winfrid Burrows	Bishop of Chichester; 1929–1958	Succeeded by Roger Wilson
