= Harold Wright (English cricketer) =

English cricketer

Harold Wright (19 February 1884 – 14 September 1915) was an English cricketer active from 1912 to 1914 who played for Leicestershire. He was born in Barrow-on-Soar and died in Marylebone, from his wounds from World War I. He appeared in eleven first-class matches as a lefthanded batsman who scored 243 runs with a highest score of 44.
