= The English School, Nicosia =

Coordinates: 35.1512°N 33.3503°E

The English School
- Αγγλική Σχολή (Greek); İngiliz Okulu (Turkish)

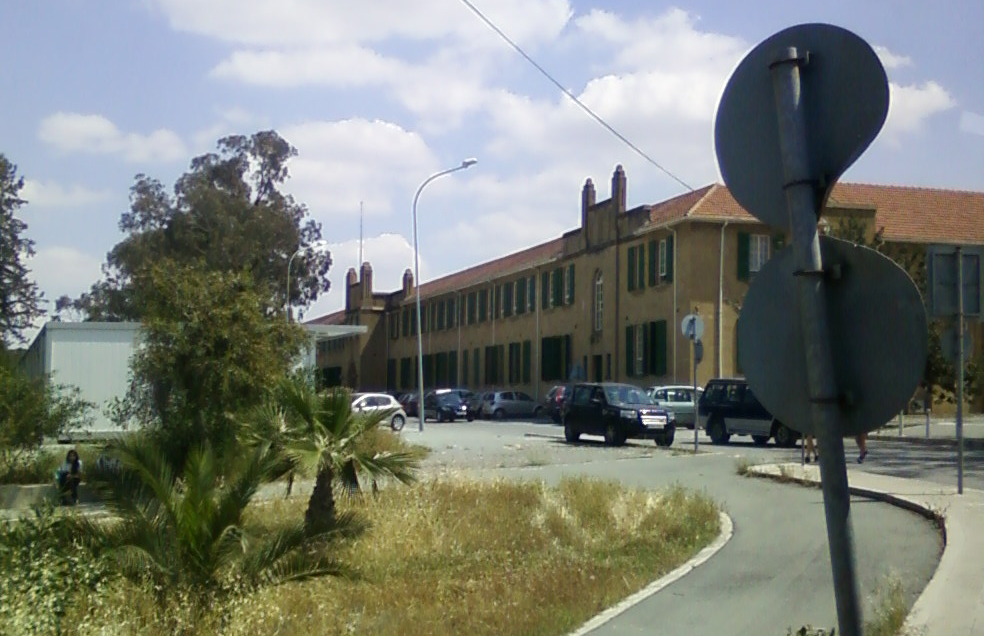
- Nicosia, Cyprus

Information
- Type: Selective Secondary School
- Motto: Non sibi sed scholae
- Established: 1900
- Founder: Frank Darvall Newham
- Chairperson: Charalambos Iosephides
- Head teacher: Popi Grouta
- Teaching staff: 110
- Age range: 11–19
- Enrollment: 1117 (585 Boys, 532 Girls)
- Houses: Wolseley; Beaconsfield; Newham; Kitchener
- Colour
- Website: www.englishschool.ac.cy

The English School is an independent selective secondary school in Nicosia, Cyprus. It has a rigorous selection process for admittance of students. It is one of the secondary schools in Nicosia designated to be bi-communal, with both Greek and Turkish Cypriots being educated at the school. The school, founded in 1900, is a member of the HMC (Headmasters' and Mistresses' Conference).

== History ==
The school was founded in 1900 by an Anglican clergyman, Canon Frank Darvall Newham and since its inception the school has offered a British-style secondary level education. Originally it only accepted the children of the British rulers of the island and was located within the medieval walls of Nicosia. Over the years it accepted Cypriot pupils too and moved to its current premises in 1939. Although a boys school at first, girls were first allowed in 1957 into an affiliated school which was then incorporated as a co-educational school in 1962.

The school started off as a private venture but control was transferred to the British Governor in 1930. Following independence from British occupation in 1960, control passed to the Cypriot Government. In 2007, the school's status and eligibility for state grants was challenged at the Supreme Court.

It is a highly selective academic co-educational secondary school and most of its leavers attend universities in Great Britain. Although previously a boarding school, it currently operates as a day school.

=== Intercommunal history ===
In 1958, EOKA distributed a text threatening Greek Cypriots that attended the school. This resulted in the parents removing students from the school and the number of Greek Cypriots attending fell from 317 to 21.

Following the Turkish invasion of Cyprus in 1974, Turkish Cypriot students withdrew from the school. From September 2003, however, the school returned to its bi-communal status by re-enrolling Turkish Cypriots.

In November 2006, Turkish Cypriot students were attacked at The English School by what was believed to be extremist members of "National Voice of Youth with a Greek Soul" (Ε.Φ.Ε.Ν). This followed reports that a Greek Cypriot student had been spat at for wearing a cross. The attackers were not other English School students. At the time, The US Department of State released the following statement:

"In April 2007 court proceedings began for 13 suspects charged with attacking Turkish Cypriot students. On November 22, 2006, 15 to 20 Greek Cypriot teenagers, believed to be members of an ultranationalist group, National Voice of Youth with a Greek Soul, entered the English School in Nicosia and attacked a group of Turkish Cypriot students, causing minor injuries. Reports in the Greek Cypriot press about an earlier incident at the same school, which reported that an 11-year-old male Turkish Cypriot student verbally insulted a Greek Cypriot student wearing a Christian cross, were blamed for inciting the latter event. The Government condemned the November 22 attack as an aberration, not indicative of a broader atmosphere of discrimination or racial hatred against Turkish Cypriots."

== Curriculum ==
The school has the following 16 departments:

1. Art and Design (see below)
2. Biology
3. Business
4. Chemistry
5. Computer Science (see below)
6. Design & Technology (see below)
7. Economics
8. English
9. Geography
10. Greek
11. Global Perspectives
12. History
13. Mathematics
14. Modern Languages (see below)
15. Music (see below)
16. Physical Education (see below)
17. Physics
18. PSHCE
19. Turkish

A Religious Instruction department also exists, but classes are optional as they are available only to Greek-Orthodox, Armenian-Orthodox and Maronite-Catholic students. Religious Education is also available for students who do not wish to partake in Religious Instruction; lessons review a more general overview of various faiths and their histories. Art and Design, Computer Science, Design and Technology, Modern Languages and Physical Education, are offered at A-Level, however, they are only taught if there are enough students interested each year.

== Grounds ==
The school is situated in a semi-wooded parkland near the centre of the capital Nicosia and is one of the largest school campus in Cyprus. The school's extensive sport grounds include a large multi-purpose indoor sports centre, a full size football field, four futsal fields, running and athletics tracks, three tennis courts, and a (lawn) hockey field. In 2017 construction commenced on a new building, the Newham building. The school has five buildings, the Lloyds building, the main building, the Newham building, the science building and the sports centre. These buildings surround a large area with benches for the students.

== Houses ==
The school operates a house system like many other British public schools. Pupils are randomly placed in one of four houses. These houses are Wolseley, Newham, Beaconsfield and Kitchener. This system mainly nurtures sporting competitions among the houses, each house has associated colours.

House	Named after	Colours
Beaconsfield	The Earl of Beaconsfield	Yellow
Kitchener	Horatio Herbert Kitchener	Dark blue
Newham	Canon Newham	Sky Blue
Wolseley	The Viscount Wolseley	Red

== Alumni ==
The school maintains an active alumni network, with a clubhouse found in the school's grounds.

Notable alumni include:

- Rauf Denktaş, Turkish Cypriot politician
- Theo Evan, singer-songwriter and dancer, Cypriot representative in the Eurovision Song Contest 2025
- Michalis Karaolis, the first EOKA revolutionary to be sentenced to death and hanged
- Alex Michaelides, writer
- Kypros Nicolaides, pioneer in fetal medicine
- Achilles Papadopoulos, diplomat
- Stephanie Solomonides, first Cypriot to reach North and South Poles
- Curtis Yarvin, computer scientist, political philosopher, neoreactionary thinker

In 2010, a book was published to list the notable Turkish Cypriot alumni of the school.

== Notable teachers ==
- Dimitris Lipertis
