= Alfred Matts =

English cricketer

Alfred Shipley Matts (2 April 1893 — 20 June 1970) was an English cricketer. He was a left-handed batsman and a left-arm bowler who played for Leicestershire.

Matts was born in Barrow-upon-Soar and died in Anstey.

Matts made a single first-class appearance for the team, in 1921, against Yorkshire. From the lower order, he scored three runs in the first innings in which he batted and a duck in the second innings, as Leicestershire lost the game by an innings margin.
