= Holy Trinity Church, Barrow upon Soar =

Church in Barrow upon Soar, Leicestershire

Coordinates: 52°45′10″N 1°08′51″W

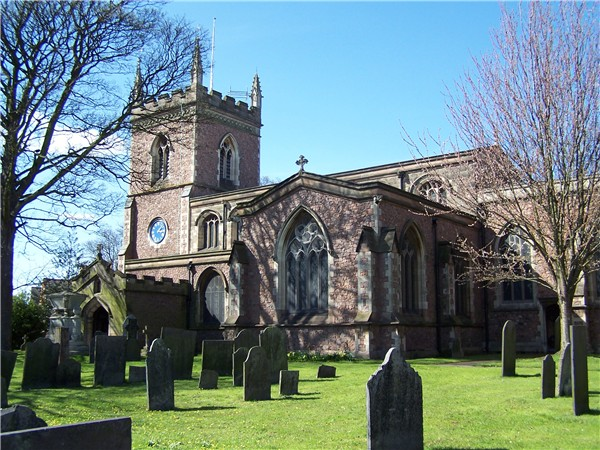
- Holy Trinity Church, Barrow upon Soar
- Denomination: Church of England

History
- Dedication: Holy Trinity

Administration
- Diocese: Leicester
- Archdeaconry: Loughborough
- Parish: Barrow upon Soar, Leicestershire

Holy Trinity Church is a church in Barrow upon Soar, Leicestershire. It is a Grade II* listed building.

== History ==
Interior

The church is mentioned in documents from Leicester Abbey dating from the 12th century.

The nave's 4 pillars date from the 12th century. The chancel was restored in 1862, the tower, which had collapsed, and other parts of the church were restored in 1863–70. The east window, by Powell & Co., dates from 1890, and depicts the arms of St John's College, Cambridge, Theophilus Cave, Humfrey Babington and Bishop William Beveridge, below the Four Evangelists.

The chancel has reredos depicting the Last Supper, choir stalls, altar rails dating from the 17th century and a memorial to Theophilus Cave.
