= John Curtis (cricketer) =

English cricketer

John Stafford Curtis (21 December 1887 – 8 March 1972) was an English cricketer active from 1906 to 1921 who played for Leicestershire. He was born in Barrow-on-Soar and died in Leicester. He appeared in 36 first-class matches as a righthanded batsman who bowled off breaks. He scored 868 runs with a highest score of 66 and took 71 wickets with a best performance of seven for 75.
