= Veronica van Heyningen =

English geneticist

Veronica van Heyningen CBE FRS FRSE FMedSci FRSB
- Born: Veronica Daniel; 12 November 1946 (age 79); Békéscsaba, Hungary
- Citizenship: United Kingdom (naturalised)
- Education: University of Cambridge (BA, MA); Northwestern University (MS); University of Oxford (DPhil)
- Spouse: Simon van Heyningen (m. 1968)
- Awards: EMBO Member (2002)
- Scientific career
- Fields: Human genetics; Developmental biology; Cis-regulatory control; Phenotype variability; PAX6
- Institutions: University of Edinburgh; MRC Human Genetics Unit; University College London; National Museums Scotland; The Genome Analysis Centre
- Thesis: Mitochondrial and other enzymes in somatic cell hybrids (1973)
- Doctoral advisor: Walter Bodmer
- Website: iris.ucl.ac.uk/iris/browse/profile?upi=VVANH41

Veronica van Heyningen (née Daniel; born 12 November 1946, Békéscsaba, Hungary) is an English geneticist who specialises in the etiology of anophthalmia as an honorary professor at University College London (UCL). She previously served as head of medical genetics at the MRC Human Genetics Unit in Edinburgh and the president of The Genetics Society. In 2014 she became president of the Galton Institute. As of 2019 she chairs the diversity committee of the Royal Society, previously chaired by Uta Frith.

== Early life ==
Veronica (Veronika) Daniel was born in 1946 in Békéscsaba, Hungary. Her parents were survivors of The Holocaust who had been interned in Nazi concentration camps. The majority of their families were murdered in Auschwitz. Her father was a textile engineer who had studied in Germany before World War II, enabling him to work after the war at a textile research institute in Budapest.

Sponsored by an uncle in Britain, the family was able to get an immigrant passport, arriving in Worthing, Sussex, on January 30, 1958. They soon moved to Loughborough, where her father had found a position as a technical director. Veronica van Heyningen has commented that these experiences made her and her sister "very aware that education is life's major portable asset". In 1963, as soon as it was legally possible to do so, her family applied for British citizenship.

She lived at 20 Valley Road in Loughborough. She started at Humphrey Perkins Grammar School from the age of 12, gaining 11 O-levels. She took Physics, Chemistry and Biology A-level, taking part in swimming, and was in the school debating society.

== Education ==
Veronica studied the Natural Sciences Tripos at the University of Cambridge, and was an undergraduate at Girton College, Cambridge where she specialised in genetics from 1965 to 1968. In June 1968 she married Simon van Heyningen, whom she had met when she was a student at Girton and he was a PhD student at King's College. Her subsequent career choices were shaped by the two-body problem.

She spent two years at Northwestern University in Evanston, Illinois, where she was awarded a Master of Science degree. After initially arranging to work on a PhD with Harry Harris in the UCL Galton Laboratory at University College London (UCL), she moved to Oxford where she was able to work with Walter Bodmer, newly arrived as Professor of Genetics. With Bodmer, van Heyningen worked on early gene mapping studies using somatic cell hybrids. She was supported by a three-year doctoral training grant from the Medical Research Council (MRC). In 1973 she completed her Doctor of Philosophy degree at the University of Oxford.

== Career ==
Van Heyningen was awarded a Beit Memorial Fellowship, which enabled her to take up a fellowship in Edinburgh with Peter Walker at the MRC Mammalian Genome Unit (MGU). In June 1977, after the fellowship ended, she joined the MRC Clinical and Population Cytogenetics Unit (CAPCU). She gained tenure there in February 1981. In 1992, Van Heyningen received funding as part of the International Research Scholar program of the Howard Hughes Medical Institute (HHMI). She became the leader of what later became known as the Medical and Developmental Genetics Section. Van Heyningen worked at CAPCU (later named the MRC Human Genetics Unit or MRC HGU) for 35 years, retiring in 2012.

Van Heyningen served as president of the European Society of Human Genetics (ESHG) in 2003 and of The Genetics Society from 2009 to 2012. Van Heyningen served as a member of the UK Human Genetics Commission.

After her retirement in 2012, Van Heyningen moved to London. She is an honorary (non-teaching) professor at the UCL Institute of Ophthalmology, associated with University College London and the Moorfields Eye Hospital. She continues to collaborate with researchers such as ophthalmologist Andrew Webster. In 2013 her work led to becoming patron of the charity Aniridia Network for people affected by aniridia in the UK.

== Research ==
Van Heyningen is a geneticist who studies eye development and disease. Among her research highlights is the discovery of the PAX6 gene, which is mutated in the eye disorder aniridia — the absence of the iris. PAX6 also coordinates the expression of other eye development genes, including the SOX2 and Orthodenticle homeobox 2 (OTX2) genes which are mutated in microphthalmia and anophthalmia. In the context of PAX6, she has explored in detail mechanisms of long-range gene regulation and aspects of phenotype variation.

== Awards and honours ==
Van Heyningen has received many awards in recognition of her work, including being appointed Commander of the Order of the British Empire (CBE) for services to science in the 2010 Birthday Honours. She was awarded the Carter Medal of the Clinical Genetics Society in 2011. Other awards include:

- 1991 Howard Hughes Medical Institute (HHMI) International Research Scholar
- 1997 Elected a Fellow of the Royal Society of Edinburgh (FRSE)
- 1999 Elected a Fellow of the Academy of Medical Sciences (FMedSci)
- 2002 Nominated a member of the European Molecular Biology Organization (EMBO)
- 2007 Elected a Fellow of the Royal Society (FRS)
- Interviewed by Jim Al-Khalili on The Life Scientific in 2014.
