= Martin Schepens =

English cricketer

Personal information
- Full name: Martin Schepens
- Born: 12 August 1955 (age 71); Barrow-on-Soar, Leicestershire, England
- Batting: Right-handed
- Bowling: Leg break

Domestic team information
- Years: Team
- 1973–1980: Leicestershire

Career statistics
Competition	First-class	List A
Matches	19	5
Runs scored	407	44
Batting average	15.58	8.80
100s/50s	–/1	–/–
Top score	57	24
Balls bowled	18	–
Wickets	–	–
Bowling average	–	–
5 wickets in innings	–	–
10 wickets in match	–	–
Best bowling	–	–
Catches/stumpings	12/–	–/–
- Source: Cricinfo, 4 March 2012

Martin Schepens (born 12 August 1955) is a former English cricketer. Schepens was a right-handed batsman who bowled leg breaks. He was born at Barrow-on-Soar, Leicestershire.

Schepens made his first-class debut for Leicestershire against Cambridge University in 1973. The following season he made his second appearance against the touring Pakistanis, before making his next appearance in the 1976 County Championship against Nottinghamshire. Schepens made sixteen further first-class appearances for the county, the last of which came against Nottinghamshire in the 1980 County Championship. In his total of nineteen first-class appearances, he scored 407 runs at an average of 17.69, with a high score of 57. This score was his only first-class half century and came against Glamorgan in 1979. Schepens also played List A cricket for Leicestershire, making his debut in that format against Essex in the 1978 Gillette Cup. He made four further List A appearances for the county, the last of which came against Surrey in the 1979 John Player League. In his five List A matches, he scored a total of 44 runs at an average of 8.80, with a high score of 24.
