= Rawlins Academy =

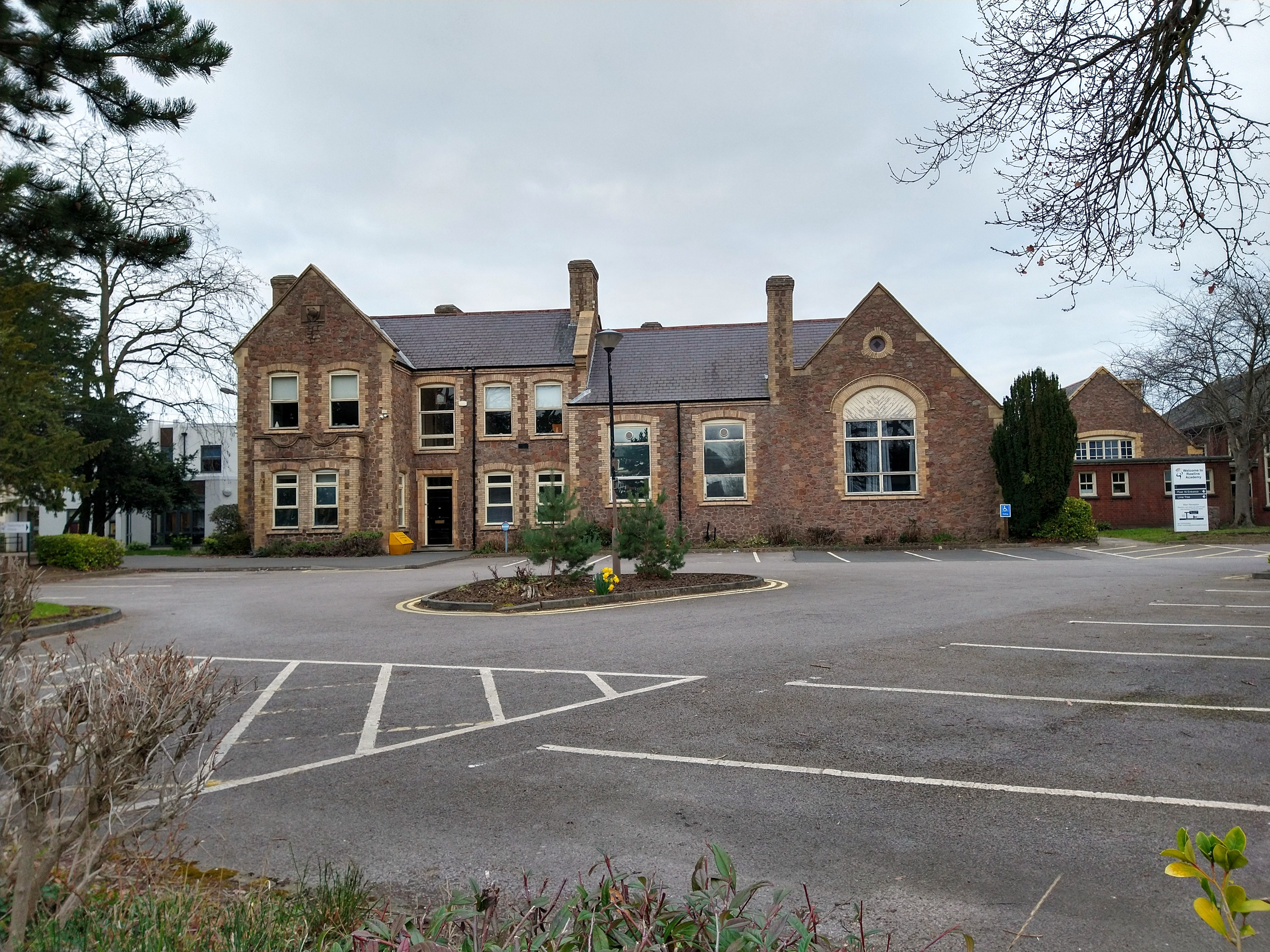

Location
- Loughborough Road; Loughborough, Leicestershire, LE12 8DY; England; 52°44′42″N 1°10′16″W

Information
- Type: Academy
- Motto: Work hard, be kind, belong
- Religious affiliation: Church of England
- Established: 1691
- Founder: Thomas Rawlins
- Department for Education URN: 137640 Tables
- Ofsted: Reports
- Principal: Stuart Morton
- Gender: Coeducational
- Age: 11 to 19
- Enrolment: 1,550 (as of 2025)
- Houses: Ignis, Terra, Aqua and Spiritus
- Colours: School uniform for Key Stages 3 and 4. Each house also has their own colour.
- Publication: Raw Release
- Diocese: Leicester
- Former names: Rawlins Grammar School Rawlins Upper School and Community College
- Website: http://www.rawlinsacademy.org.uk

Rawlins Academy is a secondary school of about 1600 students situated in Quorn, Leicestershire, England. It has a large Sixth Form of approximately 300 students, offering a wide array of A-Level subjects.

== History ==
=== Origin ===
Thomas Rawlins founded the school in 1691.

=== Grammar school ===
Rawlins became the Thomas Rawlins Grammar School, also known as Rawlins Grammar School.

=== Comprehensive ===
Leicestershire changed to comprehensive schools in the 1960s and 1970s, with its Leicestershire plan, implementing three-tier education with upper schools from the age of 14. The school was known as Rawlins School and Community College from 1967, before being renamed the Rawlins Upper School and Community College in the late 1970s.

In September 2013, Rawlins admitted over 240 year seven students as it moved from 14-19 provision to 11-19.

=== Academy ===
On 1 November 2011, Rawlins Community College officially gained academy status and became independent of local authority control. In September 2013 the name of the school became Rawlins Academy.

=== Principal update ===
In April 2026, Stuart Morton became the new principal of Rawlins Academy taking over from Bob White. Instantly there was a new school motto introduced, 'Work hard, Be Kind, Belong' which was presented to parents and students as encapsulating the new direction of the school.

== Structure ==
The school uses the house system. From 2009 to 2017, there were vertical tutor groups with students from all years being placed in the same forms. In 2017, Rawlins changed its coaching system to year tutor groups.

== Media enterprises ==
=== Raw TV ===
Raw TV broadcasts programs from news to event coverage and general entertainment programming via the Rawlins VLE. The current regular programme is the Raw TV News. Other shows currently air as one-off specials and cover anything from sporting events to Rawlins filmmakers. Raw TV was featured on BBC East Midlands Today in December 2008 as it is one of the only student run college TV networks in the country. The students who run Raw TV work in partnership with other local schools. Programs are edited by students using Apple Final Cut Pro.

== Notable former pupils ==
- Dorothy Bennett, Professor of Cell Biology, since 1999, at the Molecular and Clinical Sciences Research Institute at St George's, University of London
- Lucy D'Orsi, née Copson, chief constable of the British Transport Police (BTP) since 2021
- Louise Lear, BBC weather presenter (only for A-levels)
- George Martin, rugby player for Leicester Tigers; Premiership Rugby winner 2021/22
- Willie Thorne, snooker player and BBC TV commentator
- Jenny Tomlinson, née Mills, Archdeacon of Birmingham since 2019
