= St Bartholomew's Church, Quorn =

Church in Quorn, Leicestershire, England

Coordinates: 52°44′38.30″N 1°10′12.50″W

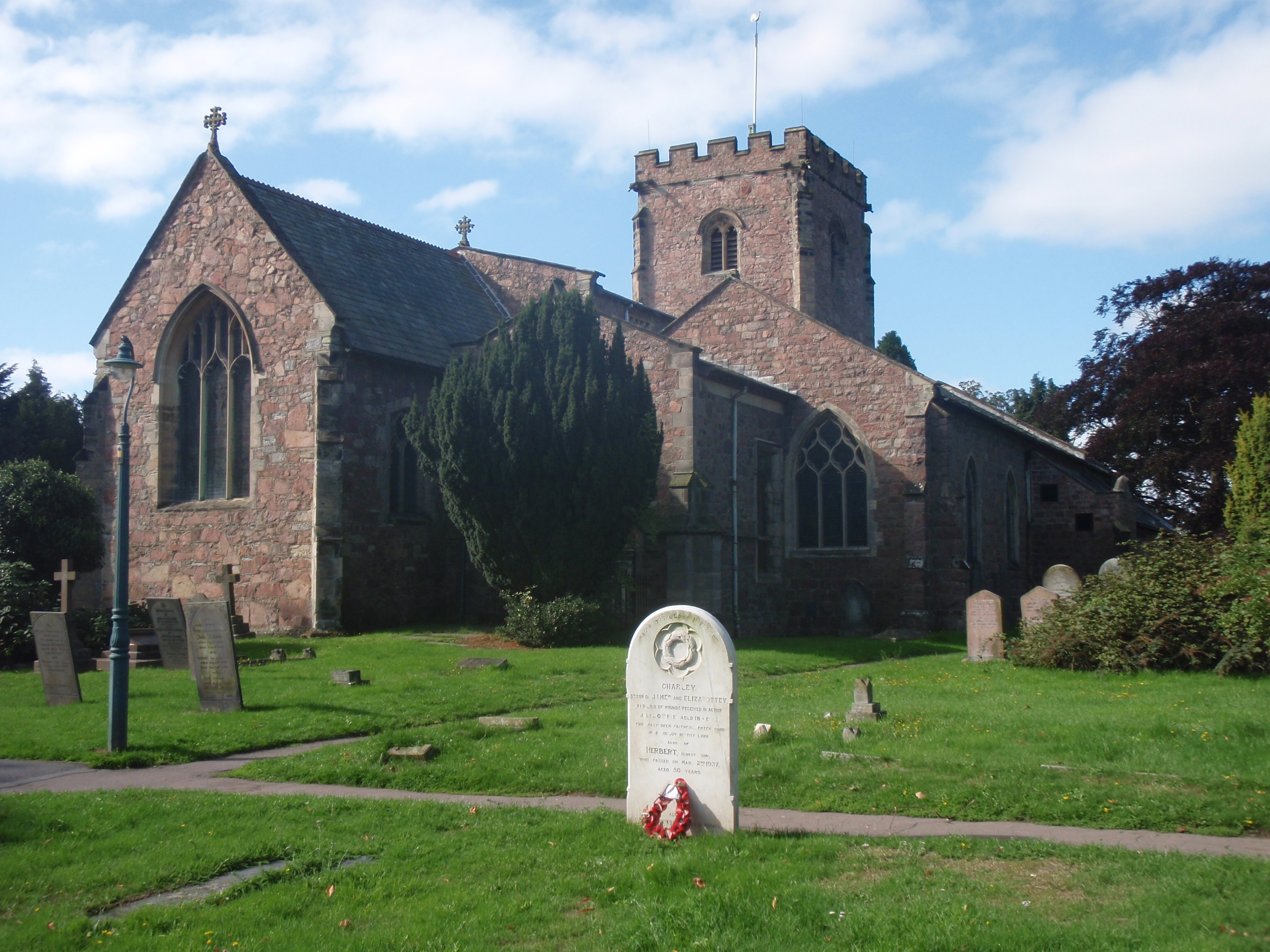
St Bartholomew's Church

St Bartholomew's Church, Quorn is the Church of England parish church for Quorn (Quorndon), Leicestershire.

It is a Grade I listed, dating from 12th century-14th century with a later 1848 addition.

The churchyard contains war graves of two army personnel of World War I and three of World War II.
