= Charnwood Museum =

Museum in Leicestershire, England

Coordinates: 52°46′14.05″N 1°12′38.9″W

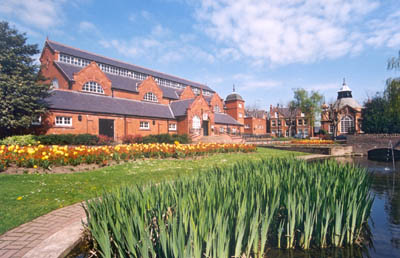
Charnwood Museum

Charnwood Museum is a local history museum in Loughborough, Leicestershire, England.

== Overview ==
It is accredited by the Museums, Libraries and Archives Council (MLA). It is managed in partnership between Leicestershire County Council and Charnwood Borough Council. Leicestershire County Council produce an Events Guide that lists all of the events at Charnwood Museum.

It has a wide range of exhibits reflecting the history, geology, archaeology and industries of Charnwood and surrounding areas. Permanent displays include ‘Coming to Charnwood’, ‘The Natural World of Charnwood’, ‘Living off the Land’ and ‘Earning a Living’. Each contains exhibits from the past and present including interactive displays, computers and audio-visuals. Visitors can handle rocks from Charnwood’s volcanic past, investigate the 4,000-year-old burial of the Cossington Boy, visit the Victorian grocer's shop or see a fly’s eye up close with a video microscope.

The museum is open every day and admission is free. It has a café and a shop and is fully accessible to disabled visitors. It runs many events including art and craft workshops held every school holiday for children, talks, tours and lectures throughout the year.

In October 2022 the museum opened a new exhibit featuring neolithic finds from Rothley.
