= Frank Darvall Newham =

Canon Frank Darvall Newham OBE (7 June 1864 – 6 March 1946) was an Anglican priest and educator from Barrow upon Soar who spent most of his career in Cyprus. He was the Director of Education of Cyprus under the colonial administration (1900-1930) and founded in 1900 The English School in Nicosia. He also served as the island's Boy Scouts commissioner, and was an honorary canon of the Anglican St. George's Cathedral, Jerusalem. He retired in 1930

During his term as Director of Education of Cyprus, Elementary Schools in Cyprus increased significantly and the quality of education improved substantially. In 1936, he gave The English School in trust to the colonial government of Cyprus and he purchased land across the Government House for the erection of a permanent building of the school.

A statue was built in his memory, next to the presidential palace, overlooking the Lloyds building. He introduced football, hockey and cricket to Cyprus. The English School's house team, Newham, was also named after him.

In the course of an around-the-world tour after he retired, he said that he planned to return to Cyprus once he finished the tour. After he returned to Cyprus, he retired to Kyrenia, where he died in 1946.
