= Gerald Hollis =

Gerald Hollis (16 May 1919 – 23 November 2005) was a British rugby player, Royal Navy officer and Church of England priest. He served as Archdeacon of Birmingham from 1974 to 1984.

== Sporting career ==
Hollis played rugby union at a senior level. As a student at Christ Church, Oxford, he was captain of the Oxford University RFC in the late 1930s. During World War II, he played for Sale, the Barbarians, and captained the Combined Services team. Later, he co-wrote with Mark Sugden a coaching manual titled Rugger: Do it this way.

== Military service ==
Hollis was prohibited from active service during World War II as he was colour blind. He joined the Royal Naval Volunteer Reserve (RNVR) in 1940, and was commissioned into the Royal Navy in 1942. He served as a physical training officer at the Britannia Royal Naval College in Dartmouth, Devon. The college was moved to Eaton Hall, Cheshire between 1943 and 1946, because of Nazi bombings.

== Ordained ministry ==
At the end of hostilities, Hollis felt drawn to holy orders: from 1945 to 1947, he trained for ordination at Wells Theological College. He was ordained into the Church of England in 1947 and then served his curacy at St Dunstan's, Stepney. In 1950, he moved to South Yorkshire where he worked as a parish priest under Leslie Hunter, Bishop of Sheffield. He first served as curate-in-charge of a new housing estate built in Rossington, Doncaster. In 1952, he additionally began ministering at the Doncaster Works; this was part of a slowly building link between the Church and industry which resulted in the formation of the British industrial mission. In 1954, he moved and became the parish priest of Armthorpe; he continued his railway ministry in addition to his new parish.

In 1960, he was appointed Vicar of Rotherham, and therefore the vicar of All Saints Church, Rotherham. In 1970, he was additionally appointed Rural Dean. The same year he was appointed an Honorary Canon of Sheffield Cathedral. On 25 September 1974, he was appointed Archdeacon of Birmingham and left Yorkshire for the Midlands. He was known to travel to visit the churches in his archdeaconry on foot. He served as a member of the House of Clergy of the General Synod of the Church of England from 1975 to 1984.

Hollis retired from full-time ministry in 1984. He was made an Honorary Canon of Birmingham Cathedral in 1984, and continued in this role until his death. He also held permission to officiate in the Diocese of Salisbury between 1987 and 2005.

== Personal life ==
In 1946, Hollis married Doreen Emmet Stancliffe. Together they had four children: three daughters and one son. His son is Tim Hollis, former Chief Constable of Humberside.

Hollis died on 23 November 2005.
