= Mansfield Owen =

English priest (1852–1940)

Charles Mansfield Owen (24 October 1852 – 4 November 1940) was an Anglican priest.

He was born at Rodborough, Gloucestershire in 1852, the seventh son of barrister Herbert Owen and Catherine Paterson. He was educated at Merton College, Oxford. Ordained in 1875, he began his career with a curacy at Holy Trinity, Southampton. In 1880, he became Vicar of Woolston then three years later St. George's Church, Edgbaston. Appointed to be Rural Dean of the area in 1905, he was promoted again to the post of Archdeacon of Aston and then in 1912 to Archdeacon of Birmingham. In 1915 he was appointed Dean of Ripon, where he remained until his death in 1940.

Owen married, in 1884, Susan Hilda Roaslie Longmore, and they had two sons:

- Basil Wilberforce Longmore Owen (1886–1943), who was an officer in the Royal Navy during World War I, and retired with the rank of Commander
- Reginald Mansfield Owen, who became a Major in the Oxfordshire and Buckinghamshire Light Infantry, and was killed in action aged 25 on the 2 August 1916 in France.

Church of England titles
Preceded by William Fremantle	Dean of Ripon; 1915 – 1940	Succeeded by Godwin Birchenough
