= Archdeacon of Birmingham =

Church of England ecclesiastical office

The Archdeacon of Birmingham is a senior ecclesiastical officer within the Diocese of Birmingham.

The archdeaconry was created within the Diocese of Worcester by Order-in-Council on 12 August 1892 (substantially from the Archdeaconry of Coventry but also from a small part of the Worcester archdeaconry) but became part of the new Diocese of Birmingham upon its creation by Order-in-Council on 13 January 1905.

The Archdeacon is responsible for the disciplinary supervision of the clergy within the archdeaconry's six deaneries: Edgbaston; Handsworth and Central; Kings Norton; Moseley; Shirley; and Warley.

The current archdeacon, since 2019, is Jenny Tomlinson.

== List of archdeacons ==
- 1894–1903: Edmund Knox, Bishop suffragan of Coventry
- 1903–1904: John Diggle
- 1904–1912: Winfrid Burrows

The archdeaconry was transferred from the diocese of Worcester to the newly created diocese of Birmingham by Order-in-Council on 13 January 1905.

- 1912–1915: Mansfield Owen
- 1915–1944: Charles Hopton
- 1944–1947: Geoffrey Allen
- 1947–1967: Sidney Harvie-Clark
- 1967–1974: Vernon Nicholls
- 1974–1984: Gerald Hollis
- 1985–January 2001: John Duncan
- 2001 – 1 November 2018 (ret.): Hayward Osborne
- 1 December 2018 – 31 May 2019: Julian Francis (Acting)
- 12 May 2019 – present: Jenny Tomlinson
