= Quorn, Leicestershire =

Village in Leicestershire, England

Coordinates: 52.742°N 1.167°W

Quorn
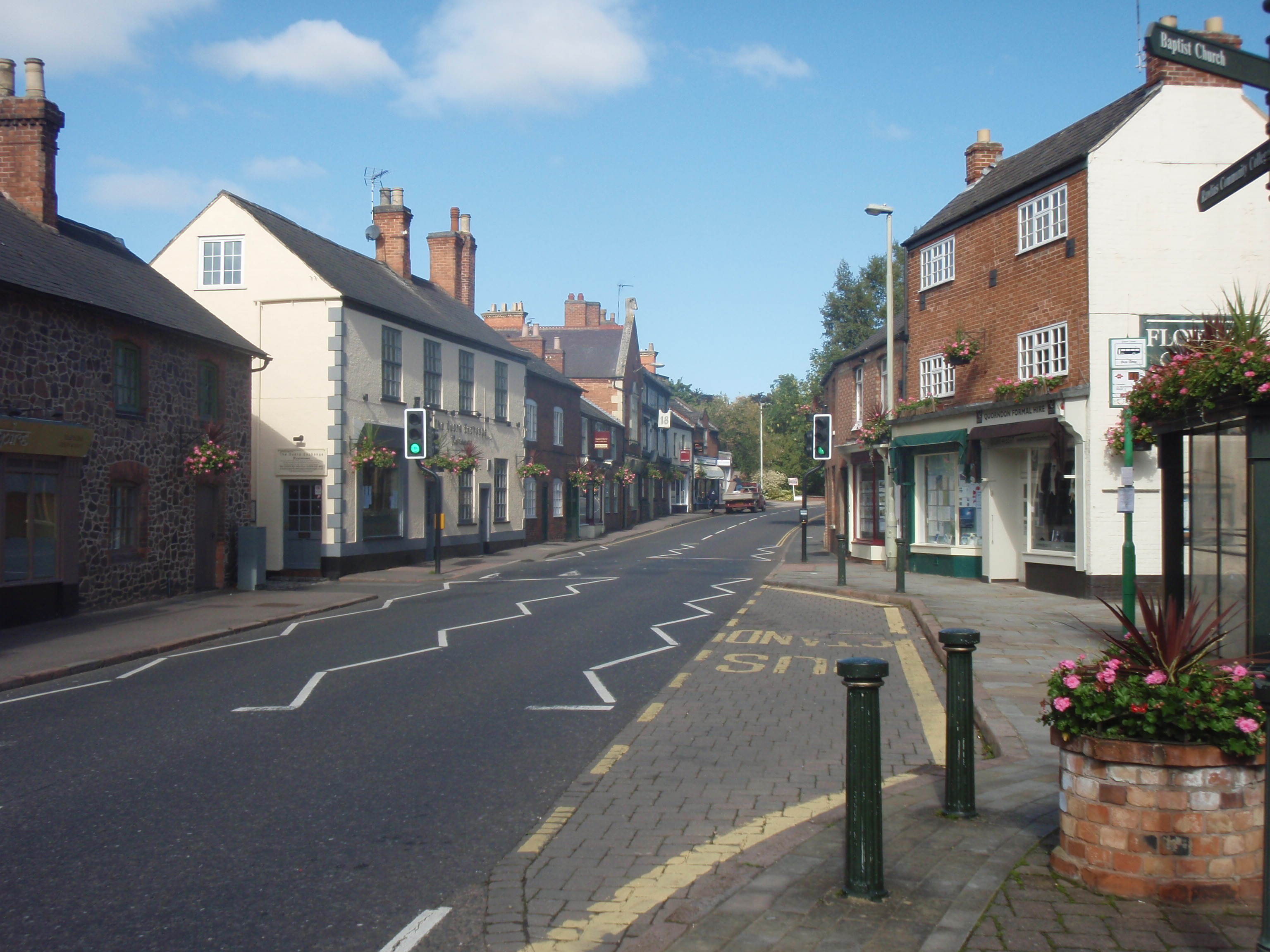
- Quorn High Street

- Location within Leicestershire
- Population: 5,177 (2011)
- OS grid reference: SK563164
- District: Charnwood
- Shire county: Leicestershire
- Region: East Midlands
- Country: England
- Sovereign state: United Kingdom
- Post town: LOUGHBOROUGH
- Postcode district: LE12
- Dialling code: 01509
- Police: Leicestershire
- Fire: Leicestershire
- Ambulance: East Midlands
- UK Parliament: Loughborough
- Website: Parish

Quorn (/kwɔːrn/) is a village and civil parish in Leicestershire, England, near the university town of Loughborough. Its name was shortened from Quorndon in 1889, to avoid postal difficulties owing to its similarity to the name of another village, Quarndon, in neighbouring Derbyshire.

== History ==
The first known evidence of the village is in the Lincoln Episcopal Registers for 1209–1235, as Quernendon. Other variations of the village name over the centuries include Querne, Quendon, Querendon, Quarendon, Qaryndon, Querinden, Querondon, and Quernedon.

The quarrying of stone in Quorn began at a very early age at Buddon Wood, on the edge of the parish. Granite millstones were quarried in the early Iron Age, and under the Romans stone was quarried for building in Leicester. Some of the larger millstones can still be seen in the area, however these days they are either used as garden ornaments, or worked into seats or slabs. The village's name is thought to be derived from the Old English cweorndun, meaning "hill (dun) where millstones (cweorn) are obtained".

Quorn Hall, off Meynell Road on the eastern edge of the village, was built for the Farnham family in about 1680. It became the home of renowned fox hunter Hugo Meynell in 1753. He established his pack of hounds there, where it continued under later masters until 1905, thus giving a name to the famous Quorn Hunt. Three Royal Navy ships have been named HMS Quorn after the hunt.

Throughout history, the village has suffered extensive flooding due to the shallow natural gradient of the River Soar. This was exacerbated in the late 18th century when locks and weirs were constructed as part of the Leicester Navigation (later the Grand Union) and the canalisation of the river.

The village is indirectly linked to the meat substitute Quorn, which began production in 1985.

== World Wars ==
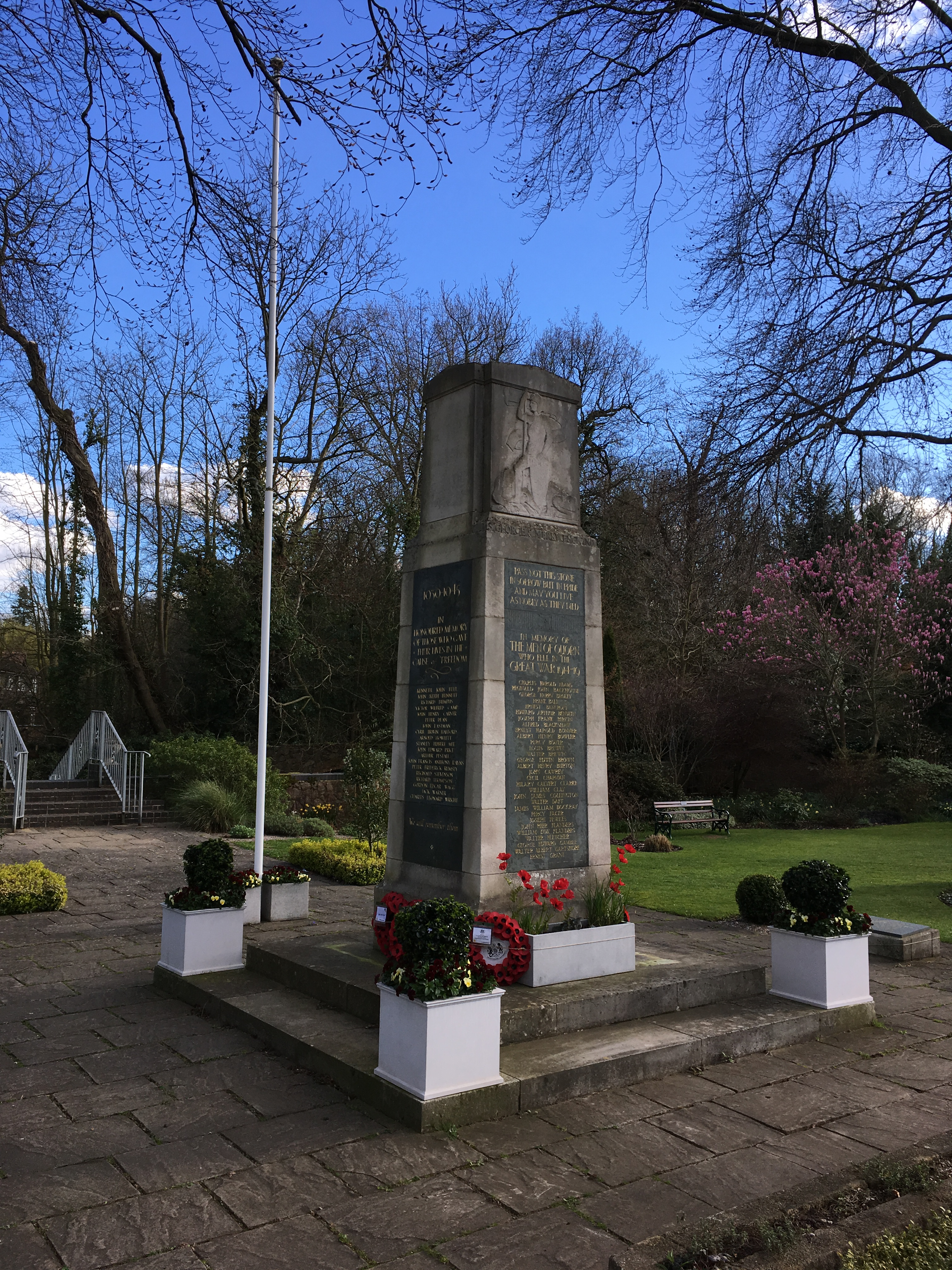
War memorial and gardens by Quorn Cross

96 men from Quorn lost their lives in the two World Wars (77 in World War I and 19 in World War II). A cenotaph in Quorn's Memorial Gardens honours these men.

Quorn Camp was established on the grounds of Quorn House during World War II. It was used as a PoW camp and was also host to a number of the United States Army 82nd Airborne Division's 505th Parachute Infantry Regiment. These paratroopers were involved in liberating the town of Sainte-Mère-Église, in Normandy, France, on the morning of D-Day and included Pvt. John Marvin Steele who famously became caught on the town's church spire. This incident is today commemorated with a dummy paratrooper and parachute attached to the church in Sainte-Mère-Église.

A number of American veterans came back to Quorn, particularly every tenth anniversary of the D-Day landings, to remember their time in Quorn and their comrades who did not return.

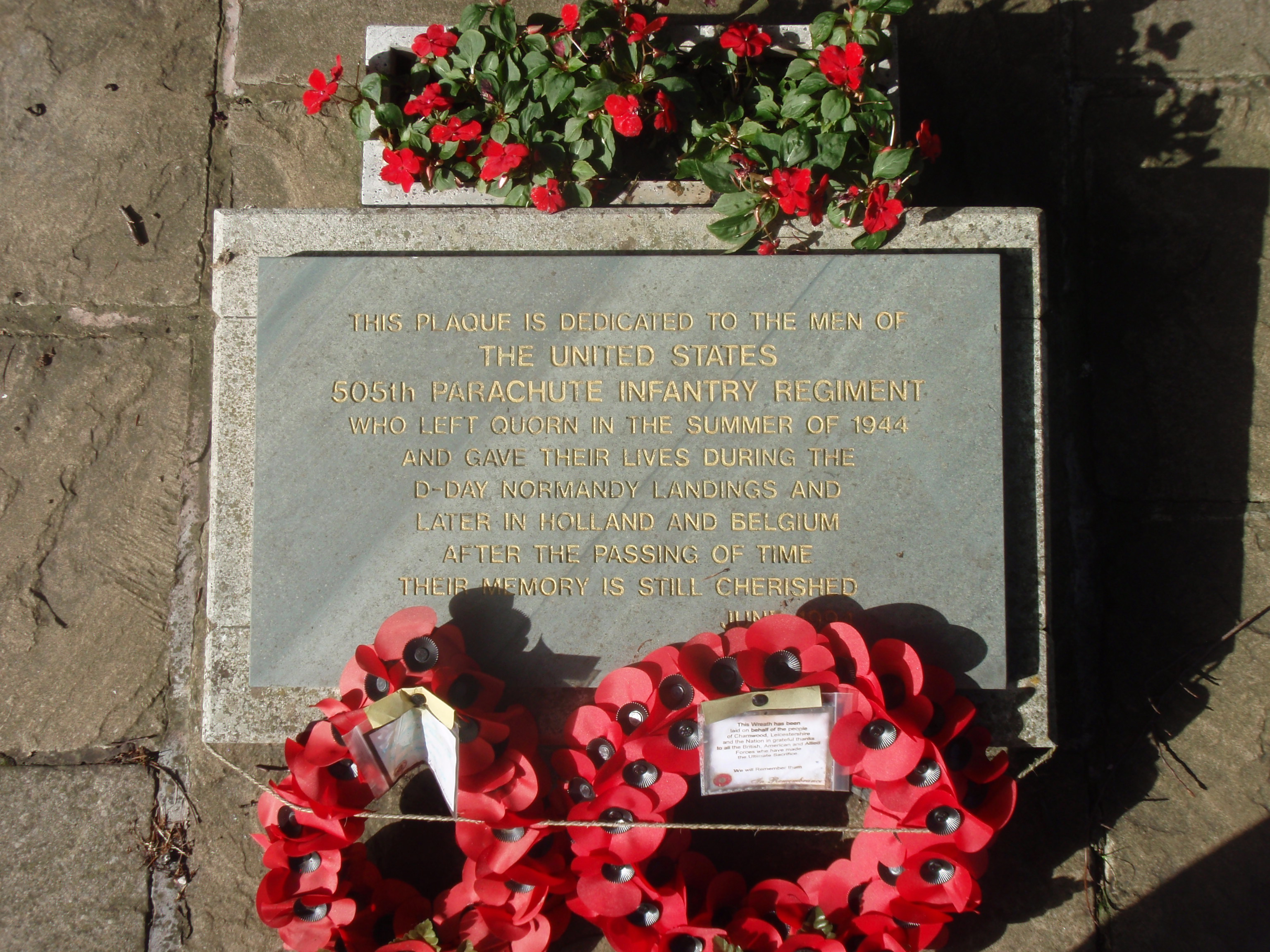
US war memorial plaque in Memorial Gardens

There is a plaque commemorating the lost US servicemen in Quorn's Memorial Gardens, upon which a poppy wreath is placed each year on Remembrance Sunday. There is also an avenue of lime trees in Stafford Orchard (the village park) in remembrance of those American soldiers that died, together with a plaque.

== Today ==
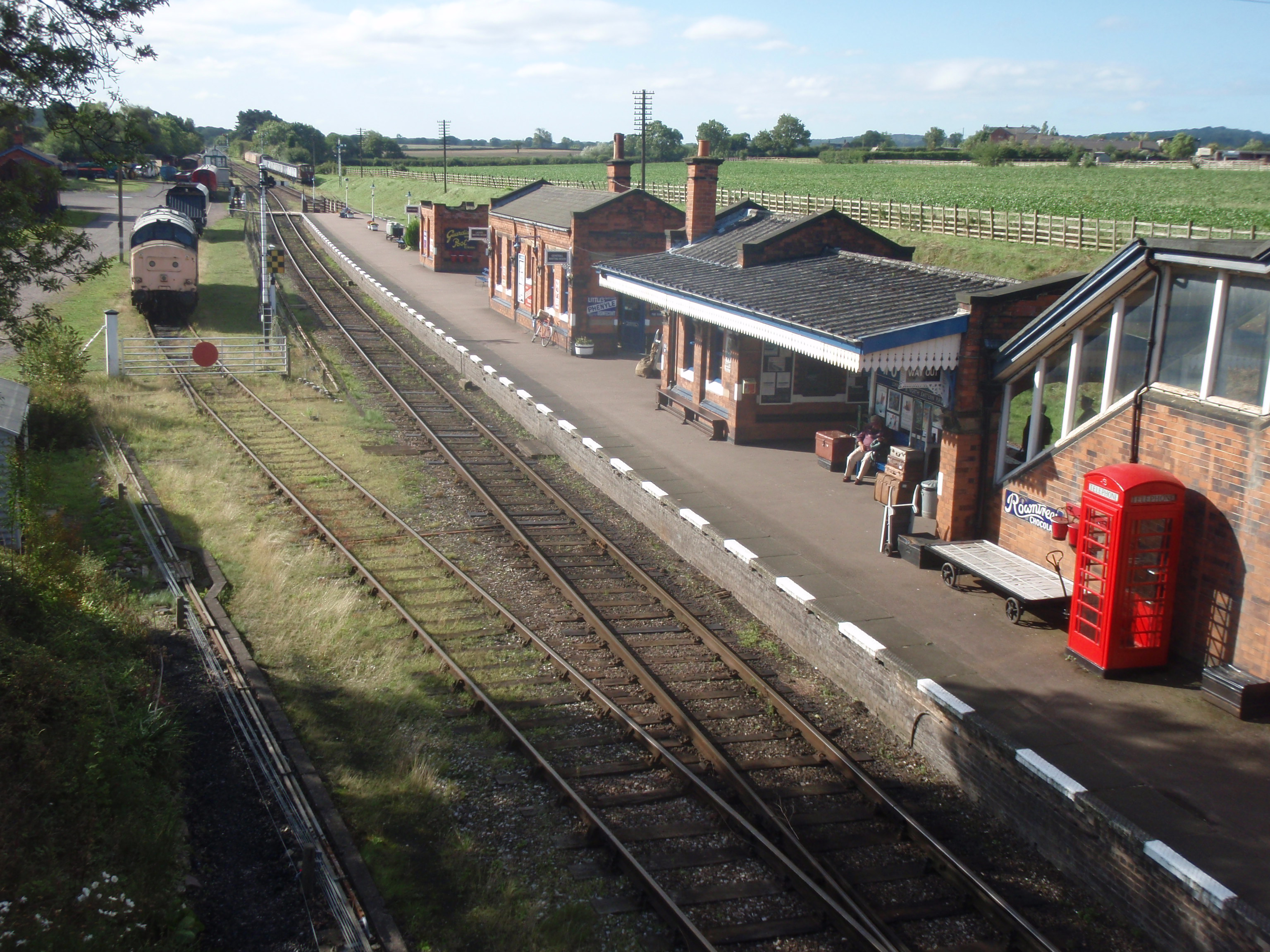
Great Central Railway, Quorn Station

Quorn is built around the old A6 road which runs through the centre of the village. On 28 October 1991 a dual carriageway bypass opened taking the A6 away to the north-eastern edge of the village.

The village has a railway station called Quorn and Woodhouse, shared with the neighbouring hamlet of Woodhouse, which was on the national Great Central Railway network, with the section through Quorn preserved as the Great Central Railway (heritage railway). Numerous royal visitors have disembarked at the station to take part in the Quorn Hunt, including the Prince of Wales (later King Edward VIII). As well as being a site of historical and cultural interest throughout the year, the station hosts a fireworks display on the Bonfire weekend. The station is also home to a small vintage tea room at the 'bridge-most' end of the platform, and the Butler Henderson Café in the main car park.

Sarson Street, running adjacent to Rawlins Community College, features many 19th-century terraced cottages, formerly those of framework knitters. Framework knitting was a major local industry until the onset of major mechanisation, and the cottages along this road display certain features typical of such an activity. Large windows for example were intended to allow in the necessary amount of light by which to work.

M. Wright & Sons Ltd have been manufacturing fabrics at Quorn Mill, on Leicester Road, since 1870. Originally producing fabrics for the footwear and corset trades, the factory now produces high technology textiles for various industries including military, aerospace and leisure.

"The Banks" area of the village is an ornate paved area with seating, designed to resemble the letter 'Q' when seen from the air.

The village prides itself on its green spaces, and more evidence of this can be seen with the opposition to proposed development at Caves field. This is a large cricket pitch with pavilion where Quorn Cricket Club play during the season, near the centre of Quorn, which was the focus of interest from a housing development company. Objection was widespread, not only at the prospect of losing the cricket field but also due to the threat to a neighbouring wetland ecosystem, considered valuable by environmentalists and the village population. The Farley Way Stadium is home to local association football club Quorn F.C. as well as Leicester City W.F.C.

In the past few years, efforts have been made to cater for the local young people. These have resulted in a half pipe being built next to the basketball court on Stafford Orchard, and a green shelter erected on the same site. In recent years the half pipe was removed and replaced by ready made ramps. Stafford Orchard is the large park, with a shaded area by the stream, youngster's play area and half pipe now appeals to people of all ages. Examples of how the Stafford Orchard contributes to the village can be seen at the large and successful Mayday celebrations, as well as the local pub football matches occasionally held there.

In 2016, Quorn was named as one of the top five places in the UK to bring up a family in a survey conducted by estate agents, Leaders.

In 2024, Quorn village suffered extensive flooding after Storm Henk hits the UK.

== Notable buildings ==
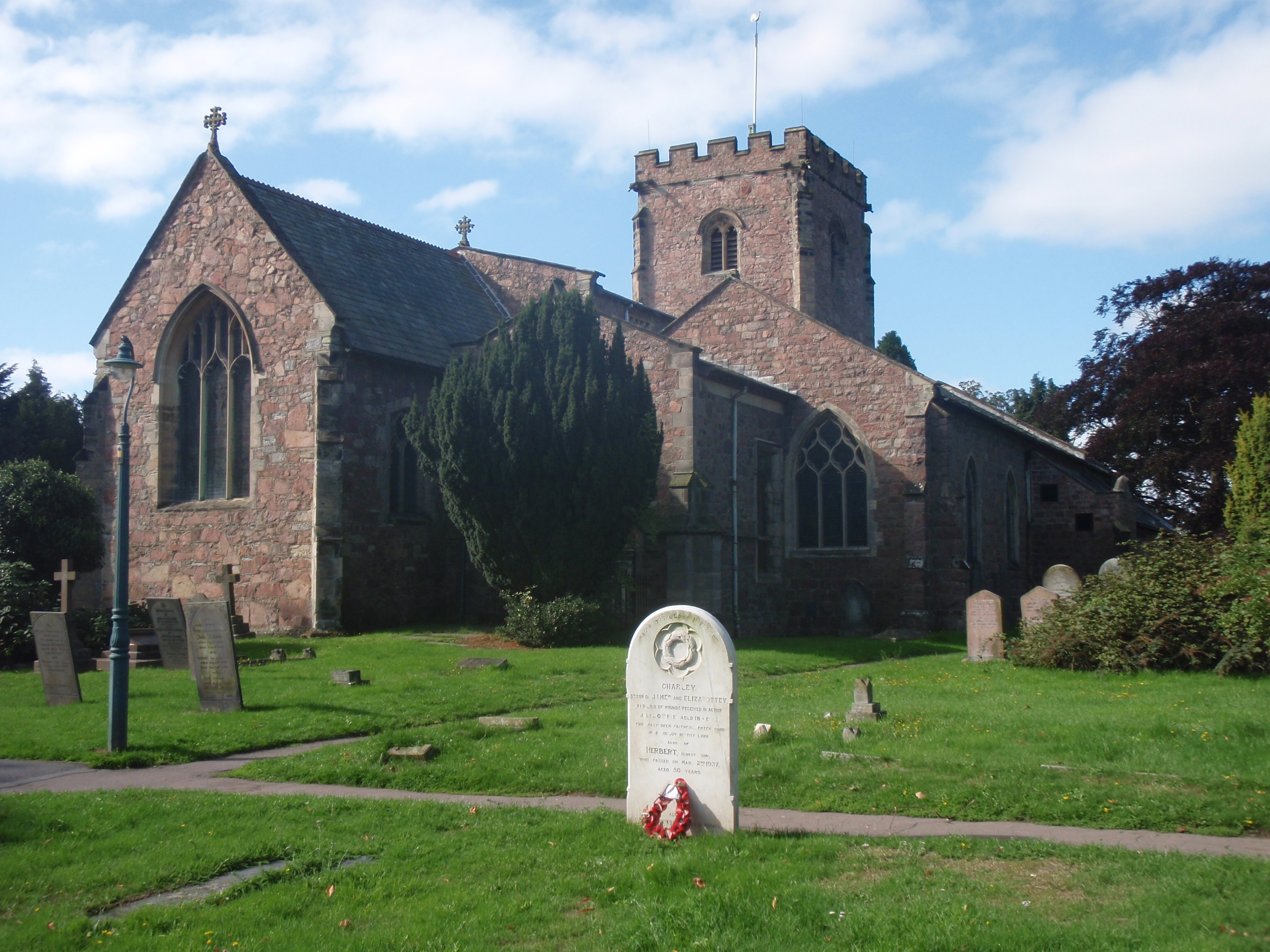
St Bartholomew's Church

The Church of St Bartholomew and Farnham Chapel is a Grade I listed building.

Quorn House, off Meeting Street, is a Grade II listed building, built in 1820, and was the seat of the Farnham family from c.1260 until 1993 when it was sold to fitness instructor Rosemary Conley, whose business occupied the building until 2015. Quorn House and the surrounding 120 acres of parkland was then purchased by Tarmac, operators of Mountsorrel Quarry, who have used the building as office space.

== Education ==
St Bartholomew's Primary School is a Church of England controlled school for foundation-age children through year 6.

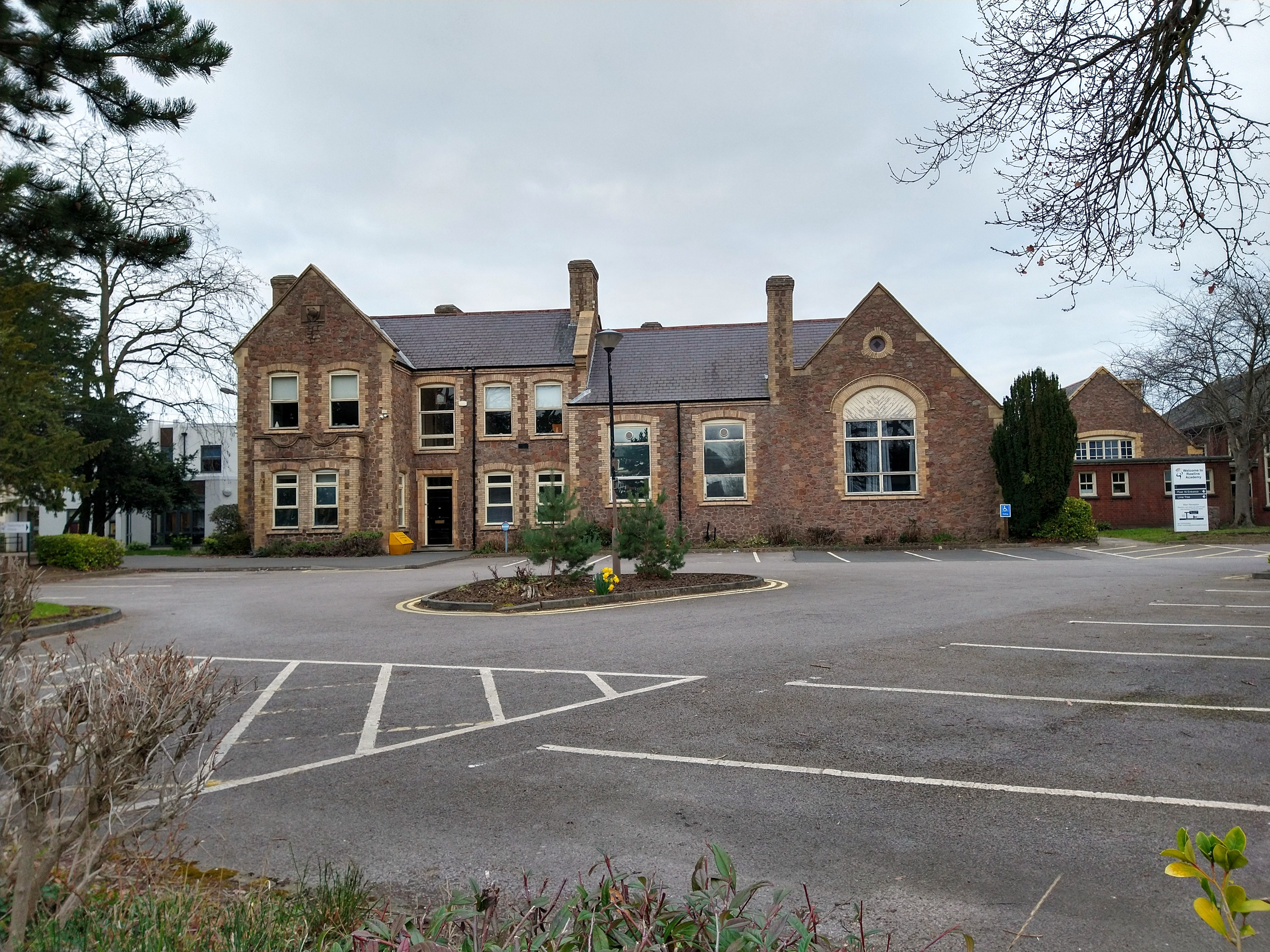
Rawlins Academy

In the centre of the village, adjacent to St Bartholomew's Church, is Rawlins Academy, a secondary school which goes from years 7 to Sixth form where they got a good in the 2017 Ofsted report and outstanding in the Sixth form. The school also provides adult education and leisure classes. This is on the site of the Thomas Rawlins Grammar School for Girls.

Loughborough Grammar School have a number of sports pitches on the edge of the village.

== Population ==
The 2011 census showed Quorn's population to be 5,177 (an increase from 4,961 in 2001), composed of 2,524 males and 2,653 females.

== Parish and boundaries ==
The full name, Quorndon, is still the official name of the civil parish.

The River Soar forms much of Quorn's eastern boundary with the village of Barrow upon Soar and captures Pilling's Lock and parts of the Grand Union Canal, Midland Main Line railway and A6 dual carriageway. The southern boundary, with the neighbouring villages of Mountsorrel, Rothley and Swithland, encompasses Buddon Wood, Mountsorrel Quarry and part of Swithland Reservoir. The Great Central Railway makes up most of western boundary with the village of Woodhouse. The northern boundary captures Bull in the Hollow Farm and is shared with the hamlet of Woodthorpe and the town of Loughborough.

== Notable residents ==
- Gordon Banks (1937 – 2019), the 1966 FIFA World Cup winning goalkeeper
- Rosemary Conley, businesswoman, author and broadcaster on exercise and health
- Jeremy Howick, University of Oxford researcher, former international rower, and competitor in The Boat Race 1996 representing Oxford
- Jane Hunt, former MP for Loughborough (Conservative)
- David Gower, former England cricketer and former cricket commentator for Sky Sports, was educated for a time in Quorn, at the Old Primary School
- Peter Jones, FA Premier League referee
- Hugo Meynell of Quorndon Hall (1735 – 1808), pioneer of fox hunting
- Peter Preston (1938 – 2018), former editor of The Guardian
- Andy Reed, former MP for Loughborough (Labour)
- Youri Tielemans, Manchester United footballer

== Quorn, Australia ==
The outback township of Quorn, South Australia, was named in May 1878 by Governor William Jervois of the then Province of South Australia after Quorn, Leicestershire – the birthplace of his private secretary, Mr J. H. B. Warner.

== See also ==
- Flesh Hovel Lane A road in Quorn
- Quorn Football Club
- Rawlins Community College
