= Mountsorrel =

Village in Leicestershire, England

Coordinates: 52.7167°N 1.15°W

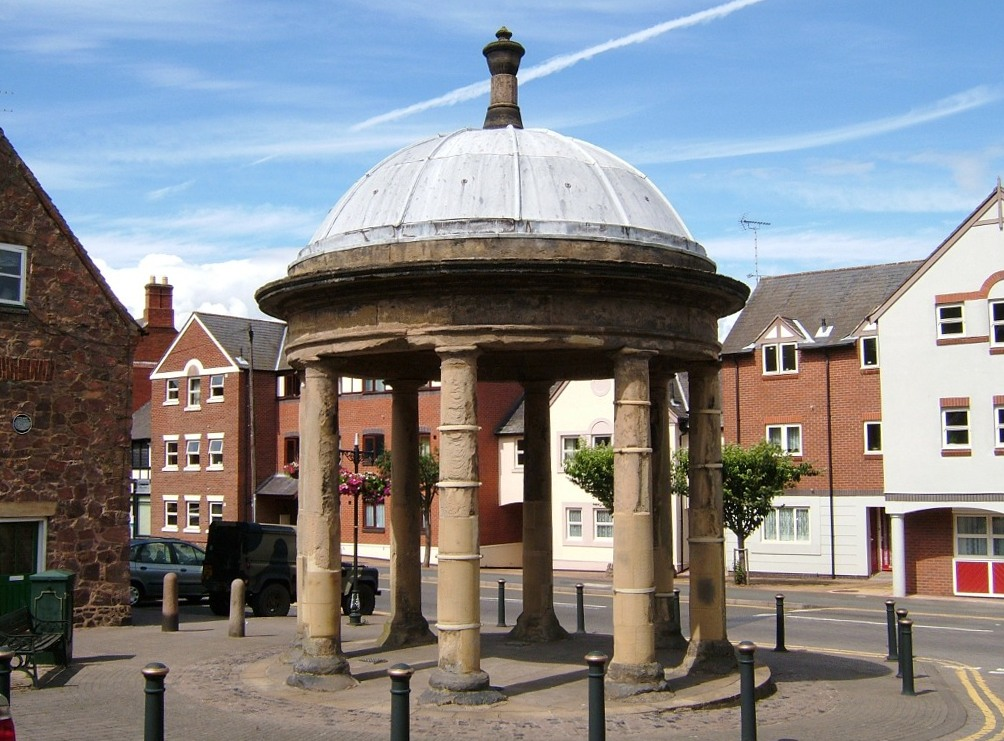
- The Butter Market

- Location within Leicestershire
- Population: 12,885 (2021 Census)
  - London: 95 miles (153 km) SSE
- District: Charnwood
- Shire county: Leicestershire
- Region: East Midlands
- Country: England
- Sovereign state: United Kingdom
- Post town: LOUGHBOROUGH
- Postcode district: LE12
- Dialling code: 0116
- Police: Leicestershire
- Fire: Leicestershire
- Ambulance: East Midlands
- UK Parliament: Mid Leicestershire

Mountsorrel is a large village in Leicestershire on the River Soar, just south of Loughborough. In 2021, it had a population of 12,885. It previously had a population in 2001 of 6,662 inhabitants, increasing to 8,223 at the 2011 census.

== Geography ==
The village is in the borough of Charnwood, surrounding a steep hill, once crowned by a castle, and is bordered to the east by the River Soar.

The village is renowned for the Buttercross Market in the village centre as well as its granite quarry, the largest in Europe. The Leicester arm of the Grand Union Canal runs through Mountsorrel.

The civil parish meets with Rothley to the south, and some houses are actually in Rothley parish near the southern A6 junction. To the west of the parish is a nature reserve. North of here, the Leicestershire Round passes east–west through the north of the village. The parish boundary meets Quorndon where it first meets the quarry near Buddon Wood. North of there, it crosses the former A6, 500 metres (1,600 ft) towards Quorn from the roundabout for the A6 roundabout. Close to the bypass, the River Soar becomes the parish boundary and south of the A6 northern junction it meets Sileby at the point where it crosses the A6 bypass. Five hundred metres (one thousand six hundred feet) south of there, the boundary leaves the river to the west, with the river becoming the Sileby-Rothley boundary.

=== Geology ===
The local area is built on granite. Leicester's Humberstone came from this granite (igneous rock), and was originally known as Hunbeort's Stan. Another piece of Mountsorrel granite is at an RAF memorial at Screveton in Nottinghamshire near the A46.

== History ==
=== Early history ===
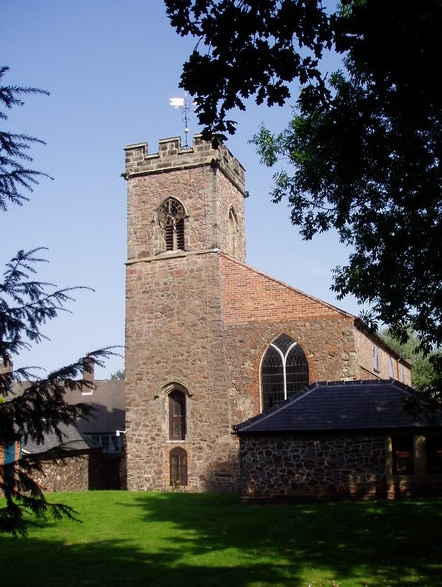
St Peter's parish church

A castle was built in 1080 by Hugh Lupus, but there is evidence of an earlier Norman settlement in the area in the form of pottery fragments. A Roman villa is supposed to have existed on Broad Hill during the 4th century AD, the site of today's quarry, as quarrying during the late 1800s revealed many artefacts including a preserved wooden bucket. However, the first recording of the village was in 1377, when it had a population of 156.

In 1151, Robert le Bossu, the Earl of Leicester and deputy to Henry II of England, who was the Justicar, or Chief Justice of the Peace for the area, acquired the tenancy of Mountsorrel castle. According to the historian Jim Bradbury, the acquisition of the castle by the Earl of Leicester was as a result of a 'final concord of peace' with Ranulf, Earl of Chester.

Whilst the origin of the name 'Mountsorrel' is still not understood fully, it is thought that the English nobility of the time named Mountsorrel after Montsoreau castle, a castle in France close to Fontevrault, where Henry II was buried. The name Mountsorrel is of Norman-French origin and is thought to have developed due to the close likeness of Montsoreau and Mountsorrel – both settlements sit on rivers, the Loire and the Soar respectively, and are overshadowed by surrounding hills.

Mountsorrel castle was used as a bastion against King Stephen, and was subsequently destroyed in 1217 by the King's men from Nottingham, branded "a nest of the Devil and den of thieves and robbers". The future King Louis VIII of France had sent support in the form of 20,000 men to the besieged barons in the castle, but this force had failed to arrive in time to prevent the razing to the ground of the castle. All that remains of the castle today is a granite crag on Castle Hill. The hill is also the site of a memorial (by Shirley Harrison, 1926) to those who lost their lives in World War I.

One of the parish churches is Christ Church and the other, a Grade II* listed building, is dedicated to St Peter.

=== Recent history ===
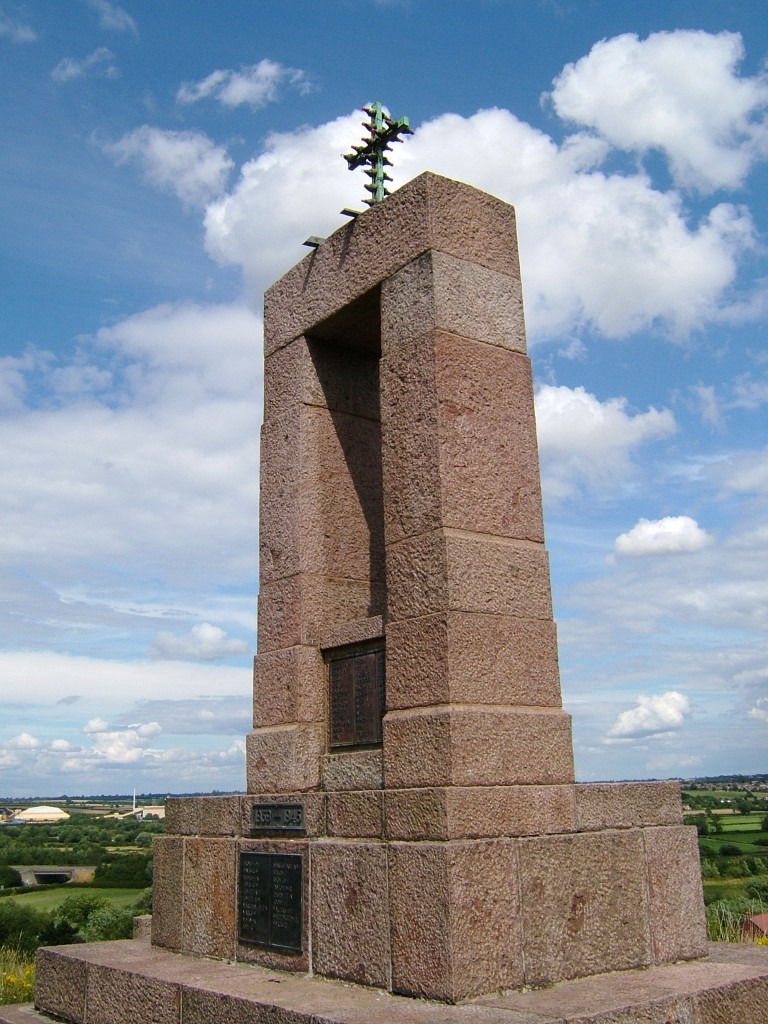
War memorial on Castle Hill

The village was visited by Methodist preacher John Wesley, where he preached in a building which now belongs to Stonehurst Family Farm, a tourist attraction. By an act of Parliament passed on 22 July 1782 Henry Walkery of Thurmaston and John Sultzer of Burton Overy were empowered to enclose the open fields and common grounds of Mountsorrel, some 300 acres (120 hectares). The Leicester Navigation was opened in 1794 and the first barges between Loughborough and Leicester departed on 26 October.

Mountsorrel was the site for a hospital for the mentally ill, which had 91 beds in 1979, but this has since closed and been converted to a housing estate.

By 1781, the population was recorded as '150 dwellings', and by 1840 the population of Mountsorrel had reached 1,900. During World War II, in 1942, Alvis, an armoured vehicle manufacturer based in Coventry, acquired a factory previously used to produce cardboard boxes in the village after their factory in Coventry was bombed by the Luftwaffe. Alvis built a new factory on the site of an old brickworks, which DeHavilland, an aeroplane propeller manufacturer, briefly used after the war until Rolls-Royce Limited acquired the site in 1945. The site has since closed and is now covered by housing (see below).

The A6 dual-carriageway Quorn-Mountsorrel Bypass opened in October 1991, allowing quarry traffic to avoid travelling through the village centre. On 31 July 2004 a new leisure centre opened in the village, the Soar Valley Leisure Centre. Christ Church & St Peters primary school is on Rothley Road.

The Stonehurst Family Farm and Motor Museum established in 1951 is located in the centre of the village and is home to many animals and offers tractor trailer rides.

=== The Butter Market ===
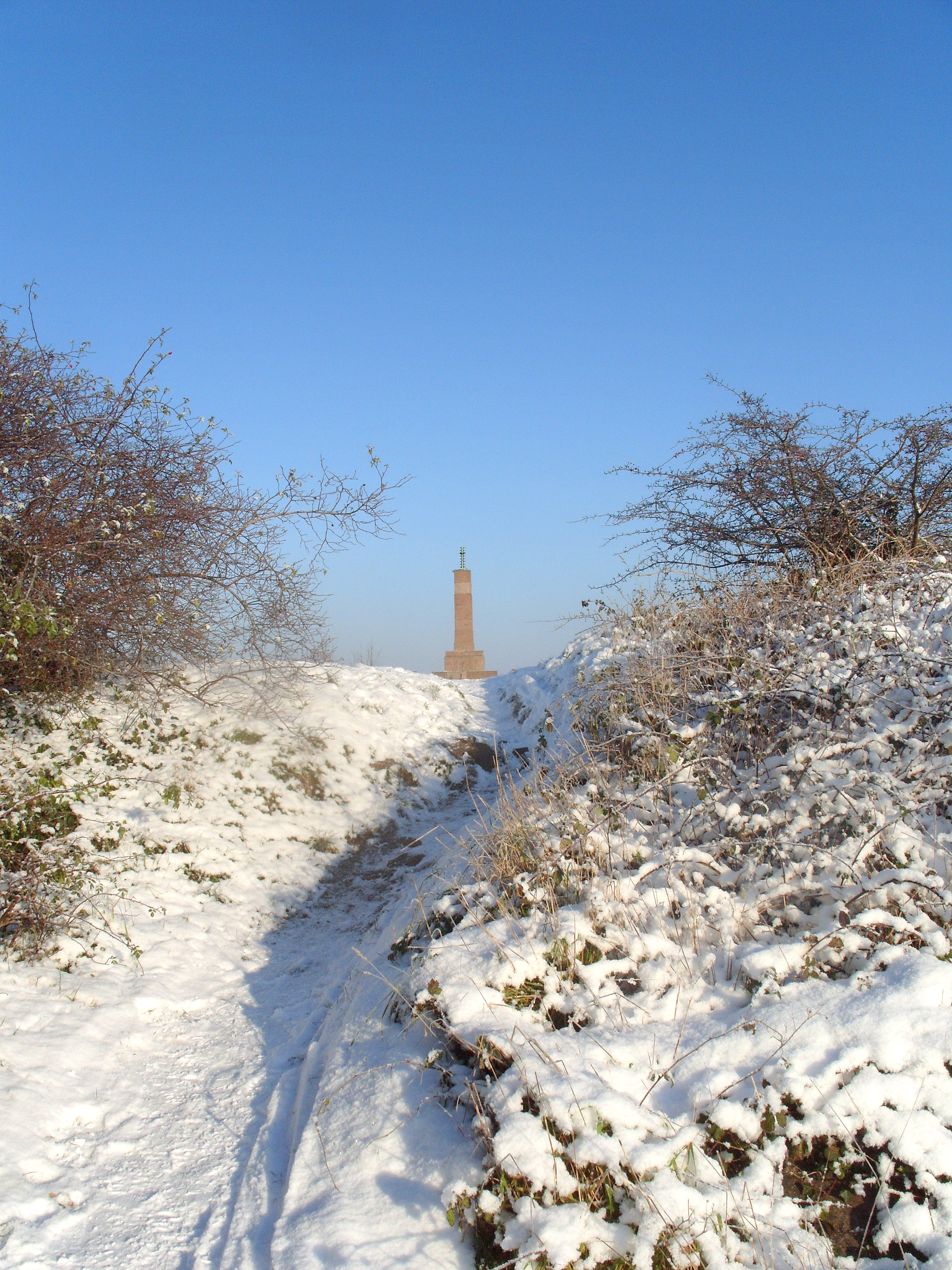
Part of Mountsorrel Castle

The Butter Market was built in 1793 by the Lord of the manor, Sir John Danvers, to replace the fifteenth century Mountsorrel Cross, a market cross which he removed for use as an ornamental garden feature on his estate in Swithland, where it still remains. It is a Grade II* listed structure.

=== The Old Rectory ===
The Adam Style building opposite St Peter's Church and actually on the Leicester to Loughborough road, was built in 1783 for Ralph Tebbutt, whose monument is in St Peter's Church. Formerly known as Mountsorrel Hall it was a vicarage until 1983. A copy of this building was erected in 1790 in Liverpool, and in that house the politician and former Prime Minister, William Ewart Gladstone (1809–1898) was born.

== Industry and trade ==
=== Market ===
In 1292, Nicholas de Seagrave became Lord of the manor and was granted by Edward I the right to hold a market in Mountsorrel each Monday. Seagrave's father, Stephen de Seagrave, was Chief Justice of England at the time, a position of great power, which may explain the granting of such a market.

In addition to the granting of the market, de Seagrave was permitted to hold an annual fair for the "eve and morrow of St John the Baptist and 5 days after". This fair was abolished in 1873 after villagers petitioned, as the legislation licensing the fair allowed anyone displaying a bush over their door to distribute liquor free of any duties.

By the eighteenth and nineteenth centuries, Mountsorrel market had become increasingly important, with trade in raw wool, leather and woollen yarn, horses and cattle as well as 'Mountsorrel gloves', once as highly regarded as gloves from Woodstock and Oxford, being common.

=== Quarry ===
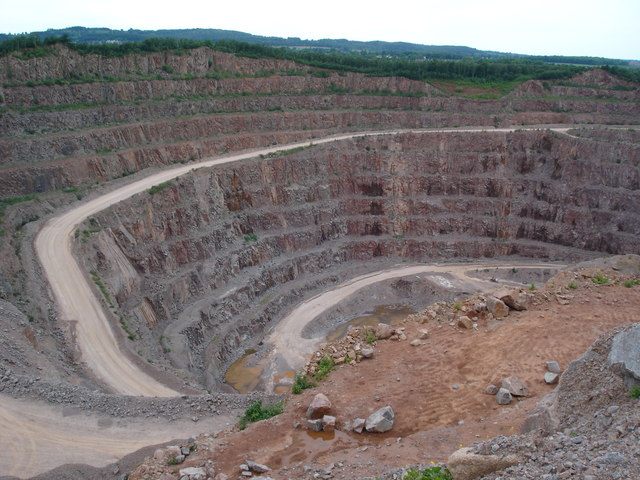
Buddon Quarry

As early as 1860, there was a branch line, the Mountsorrel Railway, to the quarry, the path of which is still followed by a mineral conveyor to Barrow-upon-Soar, where quarry rock is sorted for distribution. Organised quarrying of the granite in Mountsorrel Quarry began in the late eighteenth century, and had around 500 employees by 1870. In 1872, the Mountsorrel Granite Company acquired the rights to quarry the area from the Broad Hill quarry, and a hospital had become established in the village to deal with those made ill by the dust created by the quarrying.

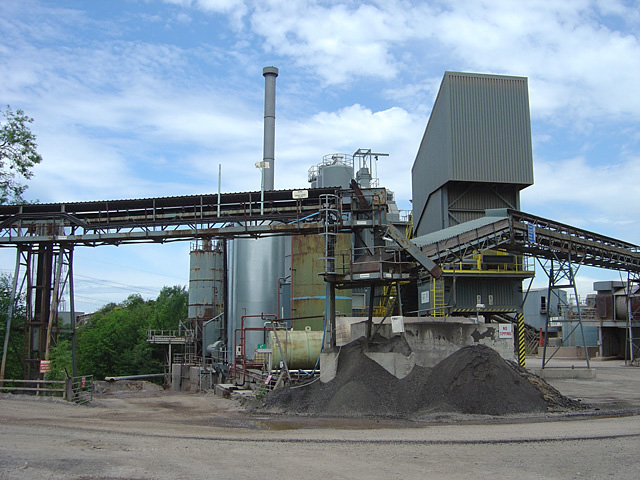
Mountsorrel quarry

Mountsorrel is home to one of the largest granite quarries in Europe, with an area of 785,400 m^{2}. The granite, technically hornblende granite, is primarily used in construction and road-repair. The quarry produces approximately 3 million tonnes per annum with reserves of 160 million tonnes of granite, making it one of the top ten largest producing quarries in Europe in 1997. The quarry is blasted at 12.30 pm most weekdays, with a force that is felt throughout most of the village, as well as in some parts of Loughborough, Quorn, Swithland, and Rothley.

The quarry was run by Redland Quarries until its acquisition by Lafarge in the 1990s. The quarry itself is home to the common lizard, an endangered species.

=== Rolls-Royce ===
Rolls-Royce acquired a factory previously used by an aircraft propeller manufacturer after World War Two in 1945. The factory, officially known as 'Rolls-Royce Mountsorrel', became a specialist production factory for 'structural and high temperature fabrications', advising on new designs of both aircraft and cars for Rolls-Royce.

In a fire during a heatwave on 13 May 1959, the manufacturing area of the factory was heavily damaged although the design department was left undamaged.

In 1969, the Mountsorrel Rolls-Royce factory designed and produced components for the RB211 engine for the Lockheed Tristar, and during the 1970s the factory employed 1,200 people. The site closed in 1994 as production methods changed and has since been replaced by a housing estate.

== Sport ==
Mountsorrel Castle Cricket Club is an amateur cricket club founded c.1880. It currently fields two senior teams in the Leicestershire and Rutland Cricket League. The home ground is based on the Memorial Recreation Ground, in Mountsorrel.

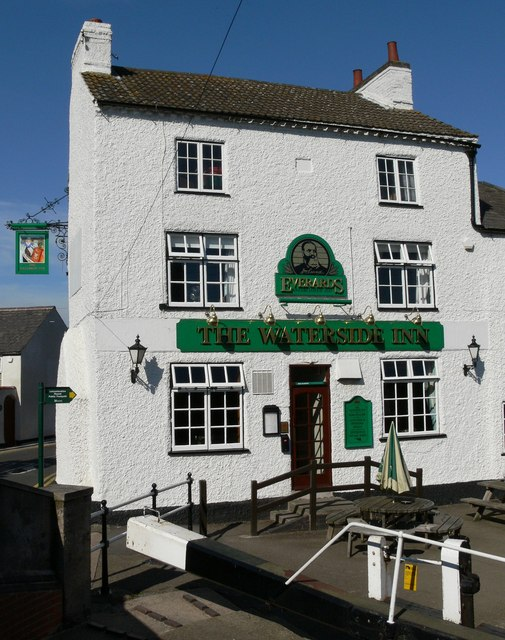
Waterside Inn

== Transport ==
The nearest major road is the A6, connecting Loughborough and Leicester. The village is currently served by only three buses.

Arriva Fox County 126/127 Leicester – Loughborough – Shepshed

Paul S Winson X27 – Loughborough – Quorn – Mountsorrel – Rothley

Roberts Coaches 27 – Loughborough – Barrow-Upon-Soar – Mountsorrel – Rothley -Syston – Thurmaston

The nearest mainline railway station is Sileby railway station, with hourly services to Leicester and Nottingham – Lincoln. The closest railway station is Mountsorrel railway station on Bond Lane, about a kilometre outside the village. The station is the terminus of the Mountsorrel Railway, a heritage railway and the branch line of the Great Central Railway.

== Notable persons ==
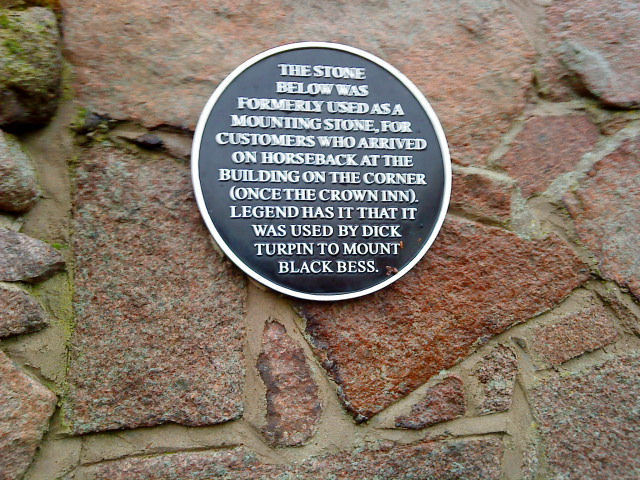
Dick Turpin plaque

- James Biddles, father of the 19th-century actor James Biddles, whose daughter Adelaide married the actor and stage manager Charles Alexander Calvert
- Rosemary Conley, the creator of the Hip & Thigh Diet, lived in Mountsorrel before moving to Quorndon.
- Professional footballer Billy Kee was born in Loughborough but raised in Mountsorrel.
- The sculptor John Charles Felix Rossi lived in the village in the 19th century
- There is a plaque, stating that it is believed locally that Dick Turpin used the mounting point opposite The Swan Inn, Loughborough Road
- Rebecca Wakefield née Brewin, was born here in 1844. She died in 1873 as a Methodist missionary in East Africa
