= Mountsorrel Railway =

Heritage railway in Leicestershire

Coordinates: 52.732967°N 1.142911°W

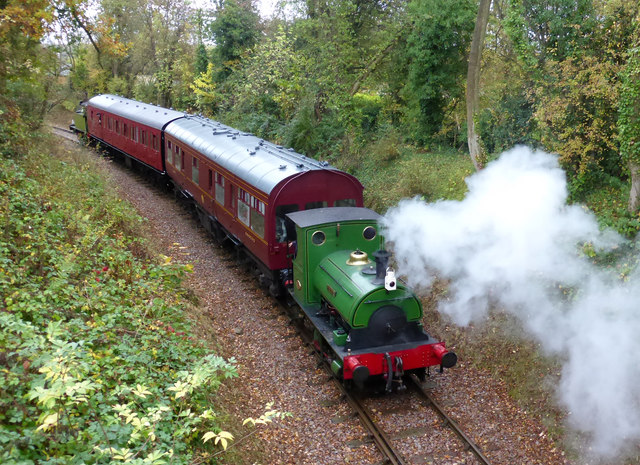
- The Mountsorrel Quarryman inaugural train on 24 October 2015
- Locale: Mountsorrel, Leicestershire, England

Preserved operations
- Operated by: Great Central Railway
- Stations: 2
- 2015: reopened

Website
- heritage-centre.co.uk

The Mountsorrel Railway was a network of industrial railway lines that served the granite quarries which dominate the Leicestershire village of Mountsorrel. After being closed in the 1950s, a section was reopened in 2015 as a heritage line run by the Mountsorrel & Rothley Community Heritage Centre.

== History ==
Mountsorrel Railway Act 1859
- Act of Parliament
- Parliament of the United Kingdom
- Long title: An Act for making a Railway from the Midland Railway to or near the Town of Mountsorrel in the County of Leicester.
- Citation: 22 & 23 Vict. c. lv

Dates
- Royal assent: 1 August 1859

Authorised by the Mountsorrel Railway Act 1859 (22 & 23 Vict. c. lv), construction started around November 1859 on a line 1.5 miles (2.4 km) long. It ran from the local quarries of the Mountsorrel Granite Company at the north west of Mountsorrel, through the village on an embankment 20 feet (6.1 m) high, crossing the turnpike road on an iron girder bridge of 39 feet (12 m) span, over the River Soar on a viaduct of 5 arches (the largest being 80 feet (24 m) in width) and then on an embankment to the Midland Railway, half a mile south of Barrow-upon-Soar railway station. The engineer was Mr. Addison of London, the contractor was Mr. Herbert of Leicester and the cost of construction was £18,000 (equivalent to £1,892,300 in 2025).

By the turn of the century there were eight-and-a-half miles of track serving the local quarries, now owned by Tarmac.

The line was extended and by 1898 ran from the Great Central Railway at Swithland Sidings.

The line fell out of use in the 1950s, the track was taken up in the 1960s, and most of the route was abandoned. Part of the 'main-line' is now covered by a conveyor belt which runs from Mountsorrel Quarry to the site of the junction on the Midland Main Line, near Barrow upon Soar. The conveyor belt replaced the original railway in the 1970s.

== Restoration ==
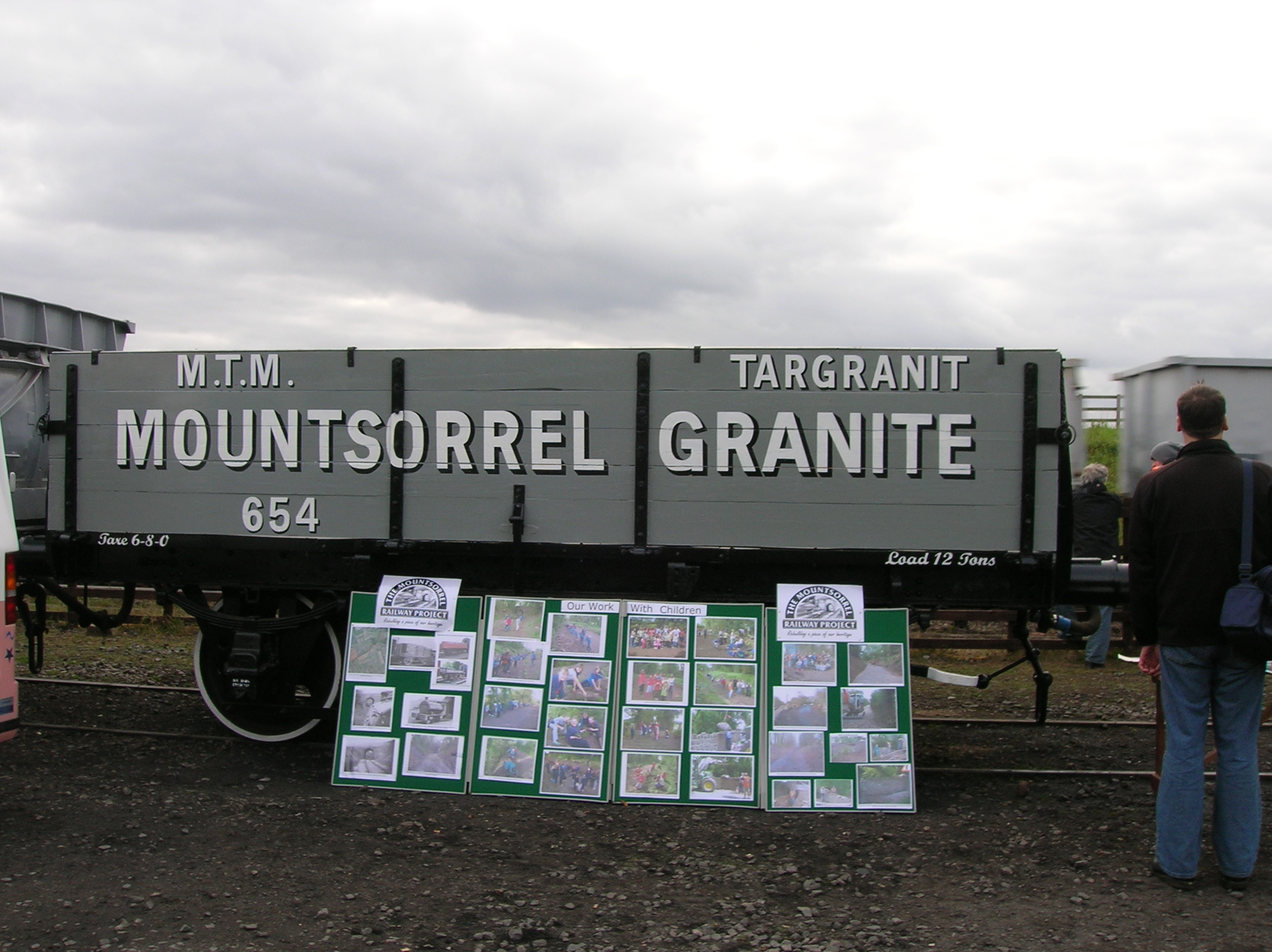
1950-built wagon No. B477060, restored as 654 for the Mountsorrel Railway project

A local resident, Steve Cramp, had been researching the railway and, as well as writing a book about it, led the project to rebuild the part of the railway going from Swithland to Mountsorrel. Donations came in for the project, including from Lafarge. The project reinstated one and a quarter miles (2 km) of new track to a small halt station under Bond Lane bridge. This enables the villagers of Mountsorrel to catch a train for nearby Rothley and then onto the rest of the preserved network. The line climbs at a grade of 1-in-62, which is far steeper than the gradients on the Great Central Mainline, as they reached only 1-in-175.

Despite numerous examples, none of the original Mountsorrel wagons had been preserved, so three wooden-bodied open wagons (two 5-plank bodies and one 3-plank) which closely resembled the old ones were selected to be returned to service in the official light grey livery of the old Mountsorrel Granite Company.

By 2010, the group had completed ballast laying over the first mile from the junction with the GCR to Wood Lane. On 10 May 2010, the track work began with the placement of a right-handed point at Swithland Sidings, the first part of the new junction. In June, the group received a £5000 donation from the Great Central's support charity, bringing them closer to their goal to complete the track laying. By May 2011, track had been laid over the first 300 m (1,000 ft) of the branch line, which allowed the first trains to run on the railway since the track lifting trains in 1959.

By the end of April 2012, phase 2 had been completed, with a further 300m laid and many hedgerows planted, and fund raising for phase three was well underway. This enabled the laying of the next 500 m (1,600 ft) of track up to Wood Lane, on the outskirts of Mountsorrel.

In early December 2012, track-laying passed through the bridge at Wood Lane. Materials had also been secured to reach the end of the line at Bond Lane. By this time, total project spend had been £90,000, with £9,500 still to be raised to complete the track to passenger-carrying standards.

In September 2014, contractors started work building a new 58-metre-long (190 ft) platform in the cutting at Bond Lane. The track laying to the current limit of the cutting, platform and sand drag had all been completed by February 2015. The complete branch line was officially opened on 24 September 2015 and the first train hauled by Peckett locomotive 'Teddy' visiting from the Chasewater Railway, and North Eastern Railway No. 1310 visiting from the Middleton Railway.

== The preserved line ==
On 21 November 2013, the first passenger train travelled the railway towards Mountsorrel hauling the project volunteers. Project leader Steve Cramp said on the day that "It’s been an emotional time for us all, everybody has worked so hard over the last six years to bring this vision to reality and it’s so nice to actually see a steam train get back up to Mountsorrel."

On 27 January 2014, planning permission for a simple 50 m-long (160 ft) platform built into the base of the cutting next to the bridge at Bond Lane was granted by Charnwood Borough Council. The platform was constructed from concrete blocks faced with Mountsorrel Granite. The aim for the new platform was to link up with Stonehurst Family Farm and Motor Museum bringing together the local community. The platform is now known as Mountsorrel railway station.

After eight years and over 80,000 hours of volunteer time, the Mountsorrel Railway was opened to the public over the weekend of 24 and 25 October 2015 by Lord Faulkner of Worcester, who is president of the Heritage Railway Association and vice chairman of the Science Museum.

The site of the former Nunckley Quarry now occupies Mountsorrel and Rothley Community Heritage Centre, which includes a coffee shop, heritage displays, a railway museum, a narrow gauge railway and Nunckley Hill railway station, as well as various other visitor attractions.

In January 2018, the Heritage Centre publicised its plans for the construction of the Discovery Centre, a brand new building which planned to provide an innovative and interactive teaching space, featuring an exhibition area, a library with archive storage, a lecture theatre/class room, a study room, and advanced AR equipment for 'hands-on' learning. The Heritage Centre applied for £800,000 from the Heritage Lottery Fund, although the bid later fell through in July of the same year due to a change in the HLF's requirements for grants.

In the summer of 2019, an extension to the railway museum was completed, providing a dedicated workshop for the restoration and maintenance of standard gauge rolling stock. A further expansion of the workshop took place in 2022, providing a new store for the narrow gauge locomotives at the site.

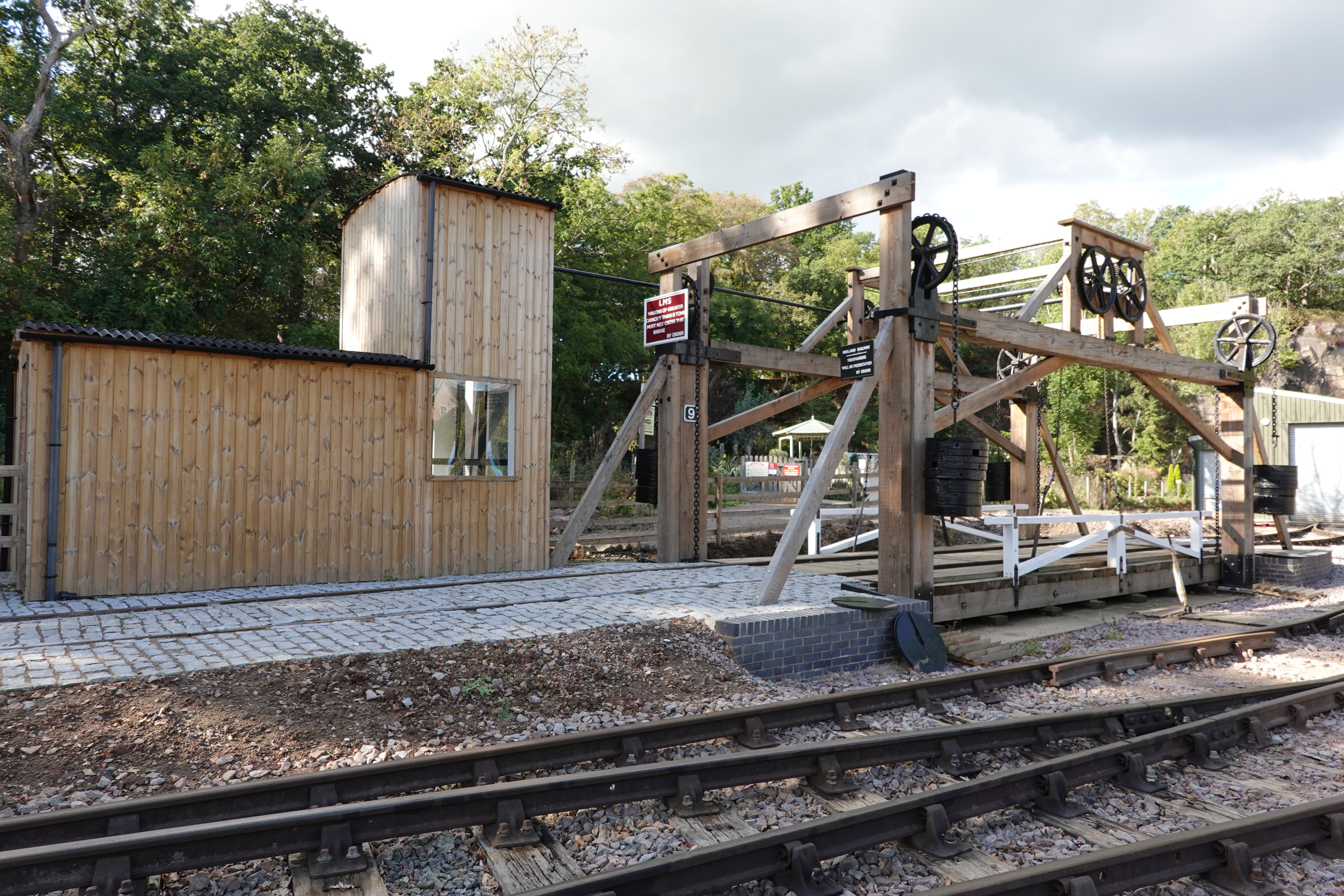
Stephenson railway lift bridge reconstructed at the Mountsorrel and Rothley Community Heritage Centre

In July 2020, the iron components of Robert Stephenson's Leicester and Swannington Railway Lift Bridge arrived at the Heritage Centre. The bridge had previously been exhibited at Snibston Discovery Centre, before it closed in 2015. The lift bridge was originally situated near West Bridge, Leicester and had been built in 1834 by Robert Stephenson to allow wagons from the Leicester and Swannington Railway to cross the Leicester Navigation, accessing nearby coal wharves. Following Snibston Discovery Centre's closure, the bridge was dismantled and the old timbers had been discarded, new beams had to be ordered as result, which did not arrive until 2022. A project of reconstruction is currently being undertaken as a collaboration between Mountsorrel and Rothley Community Heritage Centre, Leicestershire County Council and Leicester Industrial History Society.

== Locomotives and rolling stock ==
=== Locomotives ===
The last surviving locomotive of the original railway is a Peckett and Sons 0-4-0ST Works No. 1759 Elizabeth of 1928 currently undergoing restoration at Rutland Railway Museum in Cottesmore, with ambitions to bring it back to the railway once restored.

Number & Name	Type	Builder	Photograph	Livery	History	Owner
48DE	Ruston and Hornsby; 48DS	Ruston and Hornsby		Green	Built in 1956, it began its life at Bardon Hill Quarry before moving to the Battlefield Line. It then spent time at Snibston until it closed. During its time at Snibston it was acquired by the Leicester museums service. It was offered to the railway on a 1-year rolling loan following Snibston's closure Operational.	Leicestershire County Council
314	Powlesland & Mason 0-4-0ST	Brush Traction		Lined Green	This is the last surviving standard gauge steam locomotive built by Brush Traction. The engine was built in 1908 for Powesland & Mason, Swansea Dock, where it was acquired by the GWR, after the grouping of the railways in 1924 and was later sold by the GWR in 1928 to Berry Wiggins & Company's Oil Refinery at Kingsnorth (Medway) in Kent. It was acquired by the Leicester Museums Service in the 1960s, they moved it to Abbey Pumping Station for display and then onto Snibston Discovery Centre until its closure in 2015, after being in storage, it was then put back on display at Nunckley Hill in 2019.	Leicestershire County Council
85049	Ruston and Hornsby; LBT Series	Ruston and Hornsby	~	Yellow	Built in 1956, it was delivered to the British Transport Commission. It is a narrow gauge Ruston used to demonstrate quarry actions and haul passenger trains on the Quarry Bottom Railway. Operational.	Mountsorrel and Rothley Community Heritage
22070	4wDM narrow gauge	Simplex	~	Yellow	Built in 1960, this locomotive was acquired by the London Brick company, and was loaned to Butlins Holiday Camp in 1974, and subsequently went to the Derbyshire Dales Narrow Gauge Railway. It arrived at Mountsorrel Heritage Centre in 2018.	Mountsorrel and Rothley Community Heritage
7595	Wickham trolley	D Wickham & Co Ltd	~	Green	Built in 1957, for part of an order to British Railways North Eastern Region. Helped in the reinstating of the railway. Operational.	Private Owner
No. 1223 Colin McAndrew	Andrew Barclay 0-4-0ST	Andrew Barclay Sons & Co.		Lined Green	Built in 1911 and spent most of its working life in Edinburgh. Preserved at the Chasewater Railway in 1968 and it remained there until October 2020 when it was sold and moved to Mountsorrel. Operational, boiler ticket expires in 2030.	Mountsorrel and Rothley Community Heritage

=== Wagons ===
Number	Wagon Type	Built	Photograph	Notes
No. 539	5 Plank	1949	~	Restored in the style of Mountsorrel Granite wagons.
No. 654	5 Plank	1950		Restored in the style of Mountsorrel Granite wagons.
No. 127	3 Plank	1942	~	Restored in the style of Mountsorrel Granite wagons.
No. 23	4 Plank	~	~	Ellis & Everard mineral wagon; formerly of Snibston Discovery Park.
No. 618	5 Plank	1928	~	Restored in the style of Snibston Colliery wagons.
No. 402	3 Plank	~	~	Restored in the style of South Leicester Colliery wagons.
No. 860	Midland Railway 20T Brake Van	1926	~	Restored in the Midland Railway livery.
No. 501987	BR 12T Ventilated Van	1954	~	Restored in LMS Grey livery.
No. 48339	Cambrian Waggon Works Tar Waggon	1940	~	Restored in Midland Tar Distilleries livery.

=== Coaches ===
Number & Name	Description	History & Current Status	Livery	Owner(s)	Date	Photograph
No. 946	MS&LR Thomas Parker 5-Compartment.	Restored	MS&LR Chocolate & Cream.	GCR Rolling Stock Trust	1888	~

== See also ==
- List of heritage railways
