= James Biddles =

James Biddles (1815 –1871) was an English, and later American, actor and theatre manager of the nineteenth century.

His career encompassed a wide range of theatrical activity: an important provincial theatre (Leicester); a touring repertory company circuit; a major West End theatre (Covent Garden); the home of equestrian drama (Astley's Amphitheatre); management of a minor theatre (the Bower Saloon); and, in the United States, initially as member of the company of the Boston Theatre and later as a touring actor-manager in venues in many parts of the country.

== Life and career ==
=== Early years ===
James Biddles was born at Mountsorrel, in Leicestershire, the eldest of the seven sons of James Biddles – a farmer – and his wife, Elizabeth. The younger James Biddles married Ann Maria Phillips at St Margaret's Church, Leicester, on 11 December 1831. Their first two children died in infancy, but at least four daughters and possibly six – sources differ – survived, of whom the eldest two, Adelaide and Clara, became well-known actresses.

As a young man Biddles had a variety of occupations, including innkeeper, tobacconist and stage performer. His biographer Richard Foulkes records that by the mid-1830s Biddles was featuring frequently in the playbills and newspaper announcements for the Leicester Theatre. Foulkes lists among Biddles's roles Guildenstern to William Macready's Hamlet; Faldo in J. B. Buckstone's farcical comedy The Happiest Days of My Life; Petro in Isaac Pocock's melodrama The Miller and his Men and Robin Roughead in John Allingham's farce Fortune's Frolics.

Biddles and his wife joined a travelling repertory company that played in theatres in Devon and the Channel Islands. According to the memoirs of their daughter Adelaide, "the work was hard because in all theatres the bill was changed every night". In October 1843 Ann Maria Biddles died from consumption at the age of thirty. Biddles and his brother Tom devised a comic lecture, Pickings from Punch, which they toured around the provinces.

=== London ===
At the end of 1844 Biddles was a member of the sixty-strong chorus in the first English production of Sophocles' Antigone, with music by Mendelssohn, at the Theatre Royal, Covent Garden. From the chorus he progressed in 1845 to supporting roles in a season at Covent Garden, playing First Gravedigger in Hamlet, Third Witch in Macbeth and Glavis in Edward Bulwer-Lytton's The Lady of Lyons.

Foulkes comments that although Covent Garden was a prestigious venue, "it offered limited scope for a low comedian" and Biddles moved on. While performing at Astley's Amphitheatre he met and married his second wife, Malvina Watts Bridges, the daughter of Reuben Bridges, the amphitheatre's ringmaster.

Biddles then took over the management of the Bower Saloon, a minor theatre south of the Thames, off Westminster Bridge Road, Lambeth on a site adjoining which the Canterbury Music Hall was built during Biddles's tenure. The Survey of London describes the Bower as a venue "used for crude melodrama and variety entertainments in the middle of the 19th century"; Foulkes refers to the repertoire as "suited to the local clientele", but adds that in between melodramas and pantomimes Biddles presented more serious plays such as Macbeth and Sheridan Knowles's William Tell.

=== United States ===
In June 1854 the audience at the Bower included Thomas Barry, the manager of the new Boston Theatre in the US. He had sailed for Europe to engage actors, and wrote home that he had also acquired "a considerable assortment of theatrical equipment … the wardrobe belonging to the Strasburg Theatre … a fine lot of stage jewelry [and] a theatrical library". Barry was sufficiently impressed to offer a contract for the "whole family – father, mother, and six children ranging in age from five to nineteen".

The family sailed to the US on the Sumter, a small barque of five hundred tons, which took six weeks to cross the Atlantic. The two eldest Biddle daughters quickly established themselves as leading attractions. Adelaide married the actor Charles Calvert and became a star on both sides of the Atlantic; Clara married Barry and for many years was the leading lady of the Boston company.

In contrast with the success of their two eldest children, Biddles and his wife were little employed at the Boston Theatre, and in 1855 Biddles secured Barry's agreement to release the couple from their contracts. He then set up a small company with an American actor to tour farces. To further this initiative he took American citizenship. He returned to England for Adelaide's marriage to Calvert in 1856, but he went back to the US and spent the rest of his life there.

Biddles, together with members of his family, appeared in American cities including Chicago, St Louis, Milwaukee and others. He died in Minneapolis on 30 October 1870. (Note: According to Adelaide's memoirs, written in her eighties, he died in Iowa in 1871.)

== Notes, references and sources ==
=== Sources ===
- Calvert, Adelaide (1911). Sixty-Eight Years on the Stage. London: Mills and Boon. OCLC 3999154.
- Foulkes, Richard (1992). The Calverts: Actors of Some Importance. London: The Society for Theatre Research. OCLC 31739082.
- Hughes, Glenn (1951). History of the American Theatre 1700–1950. New York: Samuel French. OCLC 331136.
