= Grade II* listed buildings in Oadby and Wigston =

There are over 20,000 Grade II* listed buildings in England. This page is a list of these buildings in Oadby and Wigston.

== Oadby and Wigston ==
| Name | Location | Type | Completed (Note: The date given is the date used by Historic England as significant for the initial building or that of an important part in the structure's description.) | Date designated | Grid ref. (Note: Sometimes known as OSGB36, the grid reference is based on the British national grid reference system used by the Ordnance Survey.) Geo-coordinates | Entry number (Note: The "List Entry Number" is a unique number assigned to each listed building and scheduled monument by Historic England.) | Image |
|---|---|---|---|---|---|---|---|
| Church of St Peter | Oadby and Wigston | Parish Church | 14th century | 26 June 1987 | SK6237000384; 52°35′52″N 1°04′50″W | 1073650 | Church of St Peter More images |
| Church of St Thomas | South Wigston, Oadby and Wigston | Parish Church | 1892-3 | 26 June 1987 | SP5864698346; 52°34′47″N 1°08′09″W | 1073656 | Church of St Thomas More images |
| 42 and 44 Bushloe End | Wigston | House | Late 17th century | 26 August 1971 | SP6036198739; 52°34′59″N 1°06′38″W | 1073657 | 42 and 44 Bushloe End More images |
| Workshop to Rear of Number 44 Bushloe End | Oadby and Wigston | Workshop | Late 19th century | 26 August 1971 | SP6034198750; 52°35′00″N 1°06′39″W | 1177412 | Upload Photo |
