= Louis Calvert =

British actor (1859–1923)

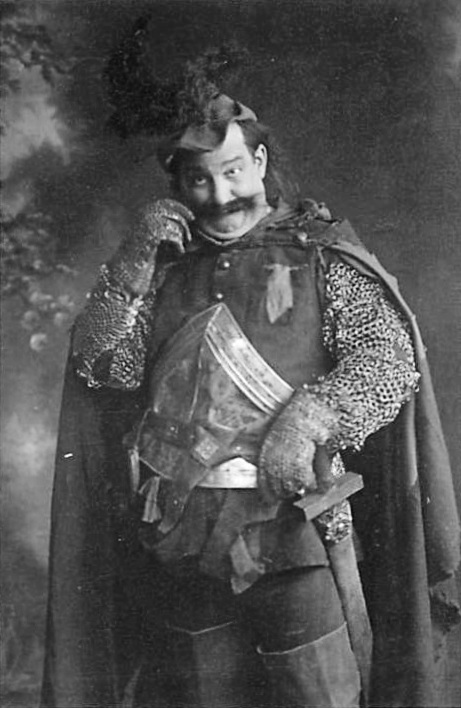
Louis Calvert as Pistol in Henry V

Louis James Calvert (25 November 1859 – 18 July 1923) was a British stage and early film actor of the late 19th and early 20th centuries and an actor-manager. He is remembered today for having created roles in plays by Bernard Shaw and for appearing in King John (1899), the earliest known example of any film based on Shakespeare,

== Early life ==
Calvert was born in Manchester, Lancashire one of eight children, and the third son, of the actors Charles Alexander Calvert and his wife Adelaide Calvert (baptised April 1836 - died 20 September 1921). He was educated privately in Manchester and in Germany. Although actively discouraged by his parents from taking up acting as a career, Louis Calvert made his theatrical debut in Natal in South Africa in 1878 before moving on to appear in Australia and then returning to Britain in 1880. During the 1880s he trained at Sarah Thorne's School of Acting at Margate, Kent, and went on to appear with Henry Irving at the Lyceum Theatre in London and toured with Lillie Langtry in the United States.

== Theatrical career ==
Calvert as Andrew Undershaft (left) and Harley Granville-Barker (right) as Adolphus Cusins in Major Barbara (1905)

He played Mark Antony to Frank Benson's Julius Caesar, and for the Manchester Committee of the Independent Theatre Society he staged and produced an Elizabethan-style version of Richard II in 1895. This innovative production brought Calvert to the attention of actor-manager Herbert Beerbohm Tree, who made him co-producer of his production of Henry IV, Part 1 at the Haymarket Theatre in May 1896, and again with Julius Caesar at Her Majesty's Theatre in January 1898. He appeared in Ben Greet's 1897 production of Macbeth at the Olympic Theatre. He appeared as Casca in Tree's 1899 production of Julius Caesar, and as Cardinal Pandulf in The Life and Death of King John in the same year, which was filmed as King John (1899), the earliest known example of any film based on Shakespeare. For Herbert Beerbohm Tree at the Haymarket Theatre Calvert played Francis Flute in A Midsummer Night's Dream in 1900, and Dogberry in Much Ado About Nothing in 1905. Of Calvert's interpretation of Dogberry, Bernard Shaw wrote in the Saturday Review: "To Mr Calvert [the dialogue] is as natural as his native speech; he makes it clear, expressive and vivid without the least preoccupation."

In 1904 Calvert created the role of Tom Broadbent in Shaw's John Bull's Other Island at the Court Theatre under the management of J. E. Vedrenne and Harley Granville-Barker. At the same theatre, and under the same management, he appeared in Shaw's You Never Can Tell in 1905, and created the role of Andrew Undershaft in Major Barbara in November 1905. He also appeared in the silent film David Garrick (1911)

== Later years ==
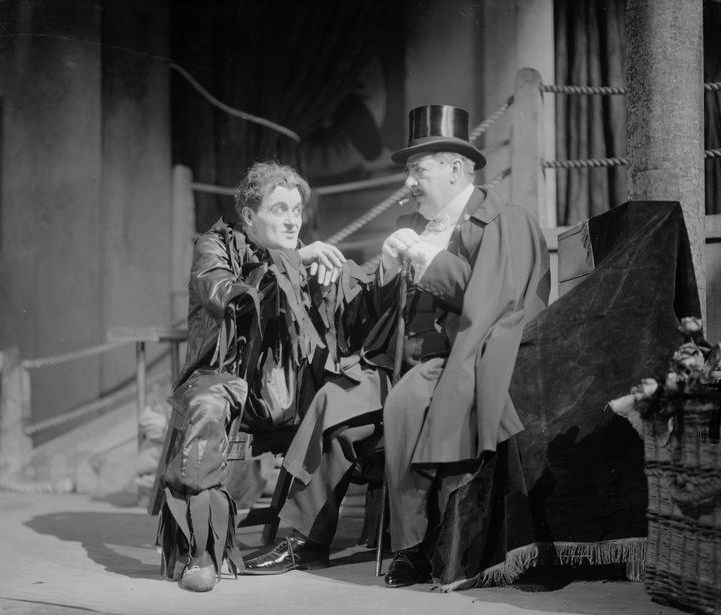
Richard Bennett (left) and Louis Calvert (right) in the English adaptation of Leonid Andreyev's He Who Gets Slapped (1922)

Calvert frequently toured the United States, and in 1909 he was appointed as the actor-manager of the New Theatre in New New York, where his responsibilities were to direct and star in productions of English plays, and especially the works of Shakespeare with a company made up of British and American actors. The first play staged was Antony and Cleopatra in November 1909 and starring E. H. Sothern and Julia Marlowe. The production was not a success; nor was the next production, Twelfth Night in January 1910. However, Calvert returned to his theatrical roots with his staging of A Winter's Tale in March 1910 which was a success largely due to his use of ensemble acting and Elizabethan staging. He directed Major Barbara at the Playhouse Theatre in New York City in 1915, and an Elizabethan-style version of The Tempest for the Shakespeare tercentenary in 1916.

Calvert spent his latter years in the United States, where he already had numerous relatives, becoming a teacher of Shakespearean acting in various universities and academies. In 1921 he created the role of Dr Ruiz in the premiere of Tom Cushing's Blood and Sand. He appeared with Richard Bennett in the 1922 English adaptation of Leonid Andreyev's He Who Gets Slapped, and played Alquist in the 1922 American premiere of Karel Čapek's R.U.R.. His last theatrical appearance was in The Adding Machine, which ran from March to May 1923.

Louis Calvert married twice: first to the actress Rose Roberts (born Rosina Matilda Ralph (1844-1915)) at St Martin in the Fields on 18 April 1886. The marriage was dissolved. Next he married the actress Violet Fenton, with whom he had two daughters, Beatrice 'Ray' Calvert and Patricia Calvert.

He died at his home on West 55th Street in New York City on 18 July 1923.

== Publications ==
- Calvert, Louis An Actor's Hamlet Mills & Boon (1912)
- Calvert, Louis Problems of the Actor Simpkin Marshall (1919).
