= Adelaide Calvert =

British playwright and actress

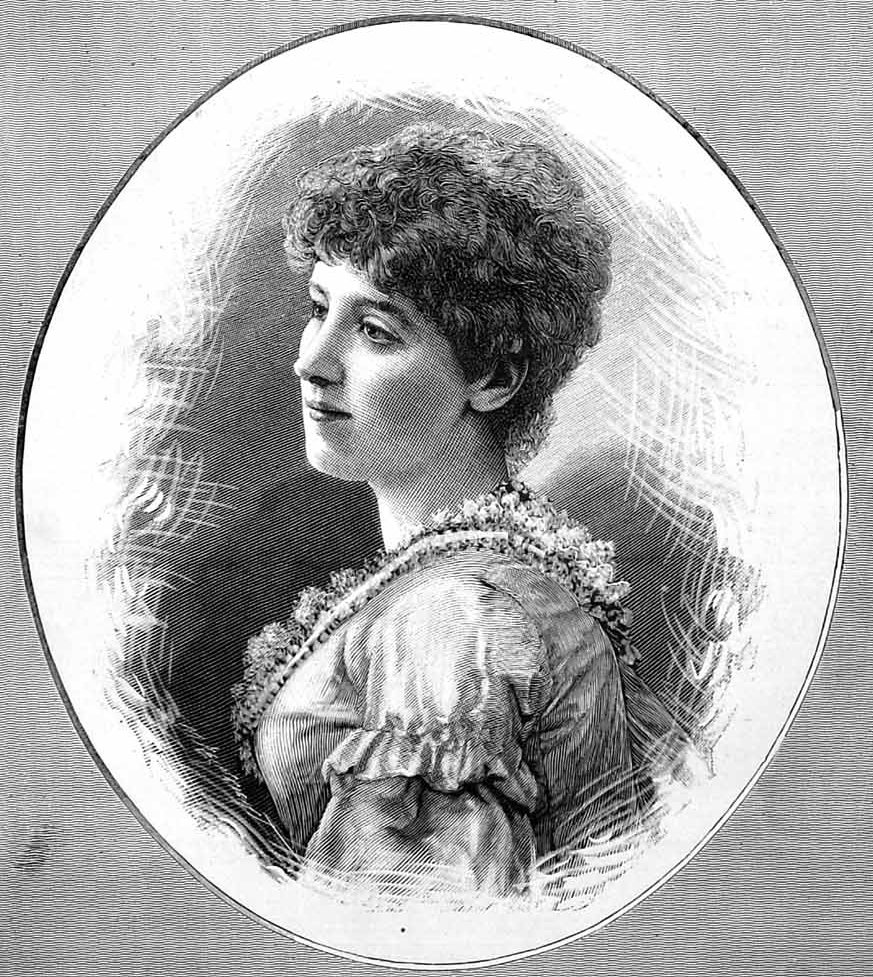
- Born: Adelaide Helen Biddles baptised in 1836; Loughborough, England, UK
- Died: 20 September 1921; Barnes, London, England, UK
- Occupation: Actress
- Spouse: Charles Calvert
- Children: 7

Adelaide Helen Calvert (née Biddles; baptised 1836 – 20 September 1921) was a British playwright and actress who achieved a 68-year career.

== Life ==
Calvert was born as Adelaide Helen Biddles in Loughborough and she appeared on stage as "child prodigy". She went to school but was recalled to acting by her parents. Her father was selling tobacco but he aspired to acting.

She and her sister, Clara, appeared in minor roles. They were friends with Mary Braddon before her interest turned to writing novels. She and her Clara would be invited to tea on Sundays and another invitee was Charles Calvert.

In 1851 Amy Lawrence: a Tale of an Old Man's Love a play she had adapted from a book was performed with Adelaide as Amy Lawrence. The play was performed at the Bower Saloon in Lambeth, which was managed by her father, James Biddles.

She married the leading actor Charles Alexander Calvert on 31 August 1856. In 1859 her husband became stage-manager/actor of the Theatre Royal, Manchester and five years later he was the manager of the newly built Prince's Theatre reviving Shakespeare. Meanwhile, went on to continue her stage success in her own right as "Adelaide Calvert". They had eight children, of whom five (three sons and two daughters) followed their parents' profession, including Louis Calvert, their third son.

Charles died in 1879 and it was said that 50,000 people watched his funeral. Adelaide was left with two daughters and five sons. In October Helen Faucit appeared as Rosalind in two benefit performances for Charles' family.

Adelaide went off to the US with Edwin Booth in 1879 and she took various minor roles in the UK and the USA. Her career was revived when she took a part in George Bernard Shaw's Arms and the Man. She worked steadily in better roles for the next fifteen years. She played the old woman in the 1911 British silent movie Henry III.

== Death ==
Calvert died in Barnes on 20 September 1921, after a career of 68 years.
