= Gimson and Company =

Engineering Company

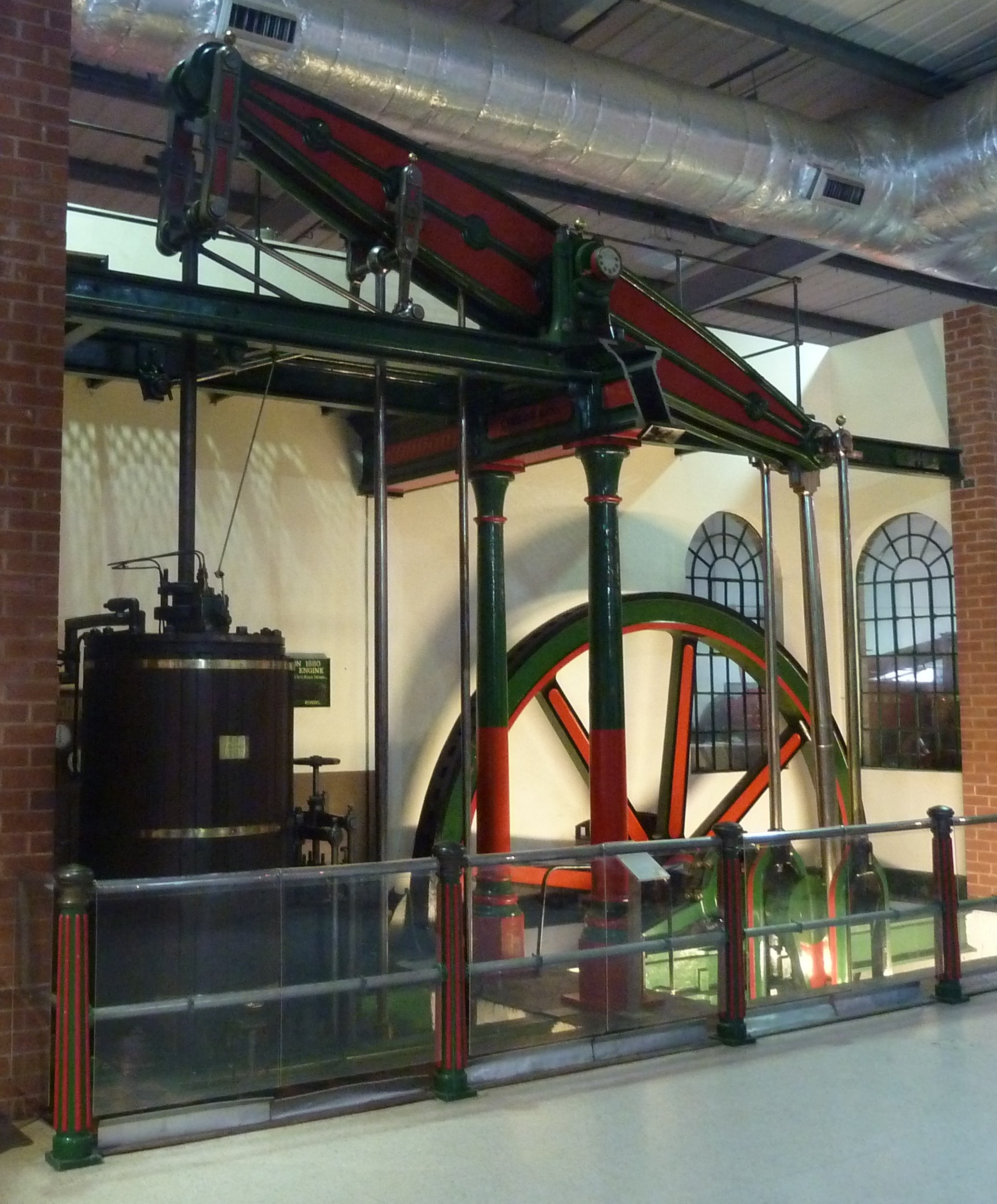
The beam engine at Snibston

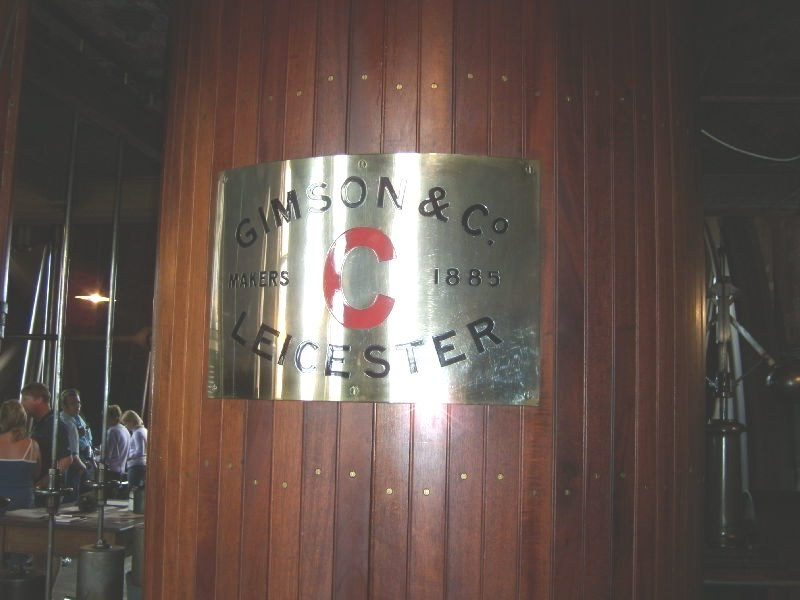
Gimson & Co builder's plaque on the cylinder casing of 'C' engine at Claymills Pumping Station

Gimson and Company were founded in 1840 by Benjamin and Josiah Gimson on Welford Road in Leicester. The company were listed as Engineers, Ironfounders, Boiler Makers & General Machinists. They later moved to Vulcan Works, Vulcan Road, Humberstone Road, Leicester.

== Expansion ==
Between 1876 and 1878 a new works, Vulcan Foundry, was developed beside the Midland Railway mainline. The site covered three and a half acres, the foundry shop was 180 ft by 62 ft. It had a workforce of 350 men and all lifting was done with steam hoists and travelling cranes.

== Boot and shoe machinery ==
Gimson became a major manufacturer of machinery for the footwear industry. The company sold its subsidiary the Gimson Shoe Machinery Company to the British United Shoe Machinery Company in 1930.

== Products ==
Stationary steam engines, passenger and goods lifts, boot and shoe machinery, agricultural machinery.

== Preserved steam engines ==
Woolf compound rotative beam pumping engines;

- Four of 1885 at Claymills Pumping Station, Burton on Trent.
- Four of 1891 at Abbey Pumping Station, Leicester

Single-cylinder condensing rotative beam pumping engines of 1879;

- One at Snibston Discovery Park, Coalville, Leics
- One at Forncett Industrial Steam Museum, Forncett St. Mary, Norfolk

Horizontal single cylinder;

- 12"×24" of 1895 Snibston Discovery Museum
- Engine of 1899 at Hall & Woodhouse., Brewery, Blandford St. Mary, Dorset.

Wall-mounted vertical single cylinder lift engine;

- One at Abbey Pumping Station, Leicester
