= Stonehurst Family Farm and Motor Museum =

Public museum and farm in Mountsorrel, Leicestershire

Coordinates: 52.732524°N 1.147145°W

- Established: 1951
- Location: Bond Lane, Mountsorrel, LE12 7AA, England Leicestershire; England
- Type: Public museum and farm
- Owner: Private
- Website: www.stonehurstfarm.co.uk

The Stonehurst Family Farm and Motor Museum is a working farm and a motor museum located in the village of Mountsorrel, Leicestershire. The farm won the Leicestershire Tourism Award for Best visitor experience 2000/2001.

== Farm ==
=== History ===
The farm (established in 1851) is currently open to the public daily and is home to many differing animals. The farm operates tractor trailer rides for the local children, currently hoping to link up with the Mountsorrel Railway creating a large linked family attraction. Stonehurst has a working farm with several interactive attractions.

=== Motor museum ===
The motor museum on the property has a large collection of vintage motorcycles and cars, including some 1960s sports cars.

== Attractions ==
- Wobbling bridges and balance beams
- Petting zoo
- Motor museum
- Tractor rides
- Adventure trail
- Pony rides
