= Stockdale Harrison =

British architect

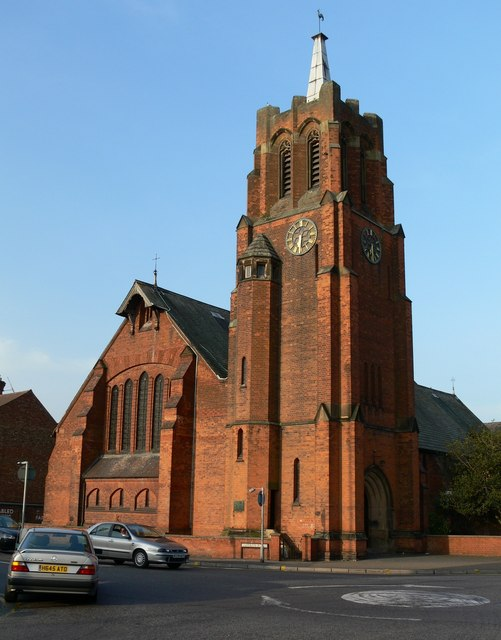
St Thomas's Church, South Wigston 1892-93

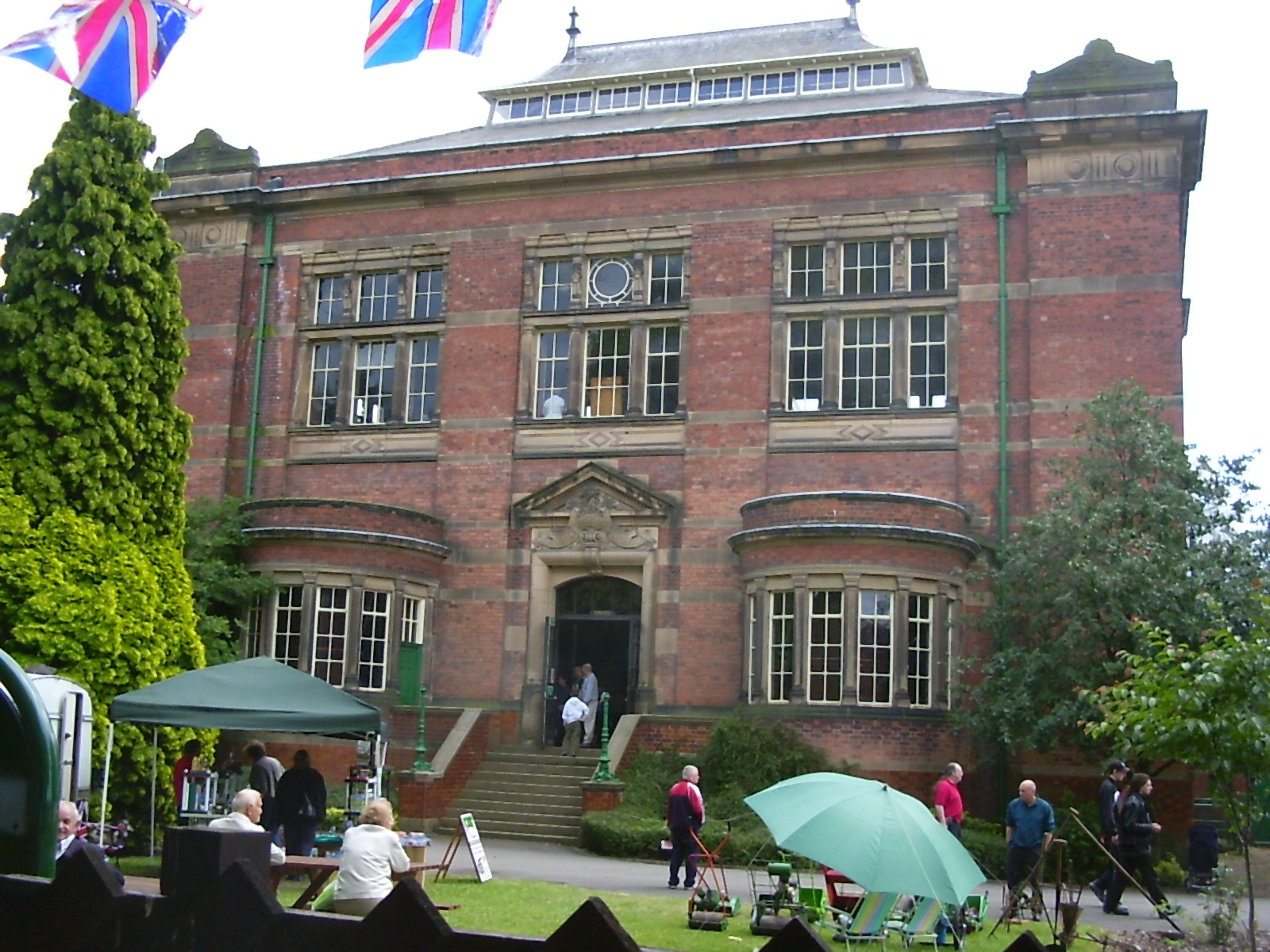
Abbey Pumping Station

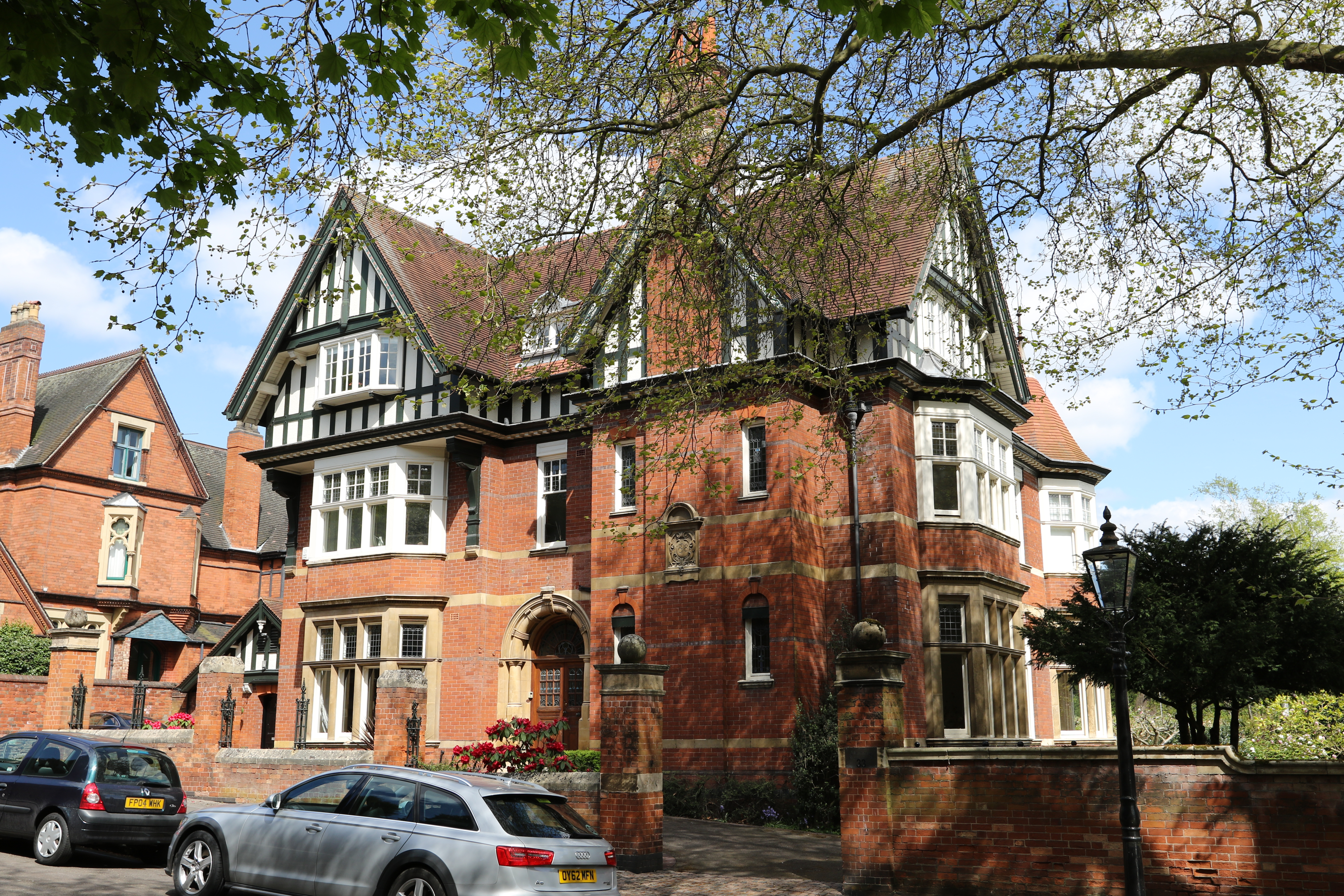
Redcliffe, The Park Estate, Nottingham 1897-98

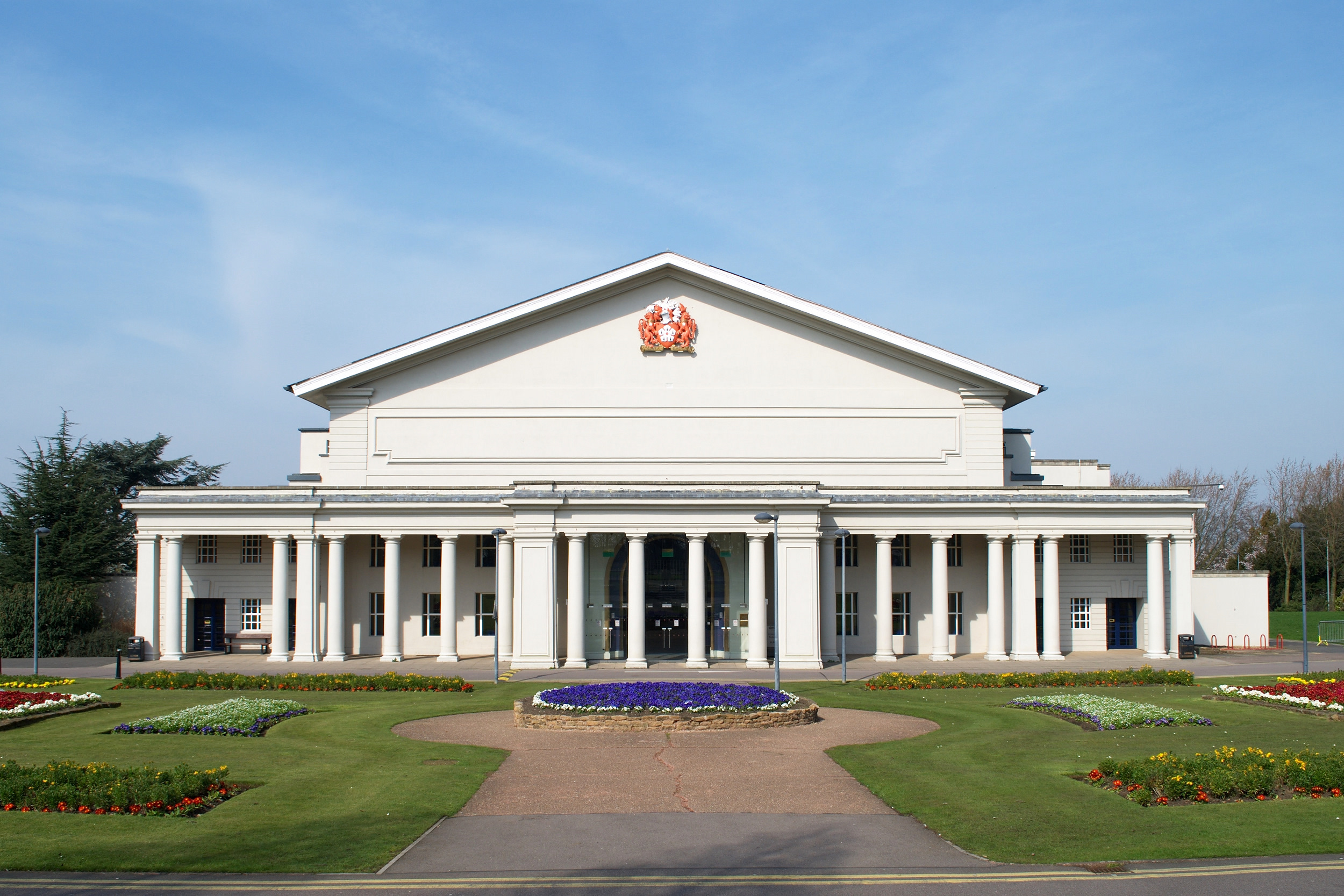
De Montfort Hall

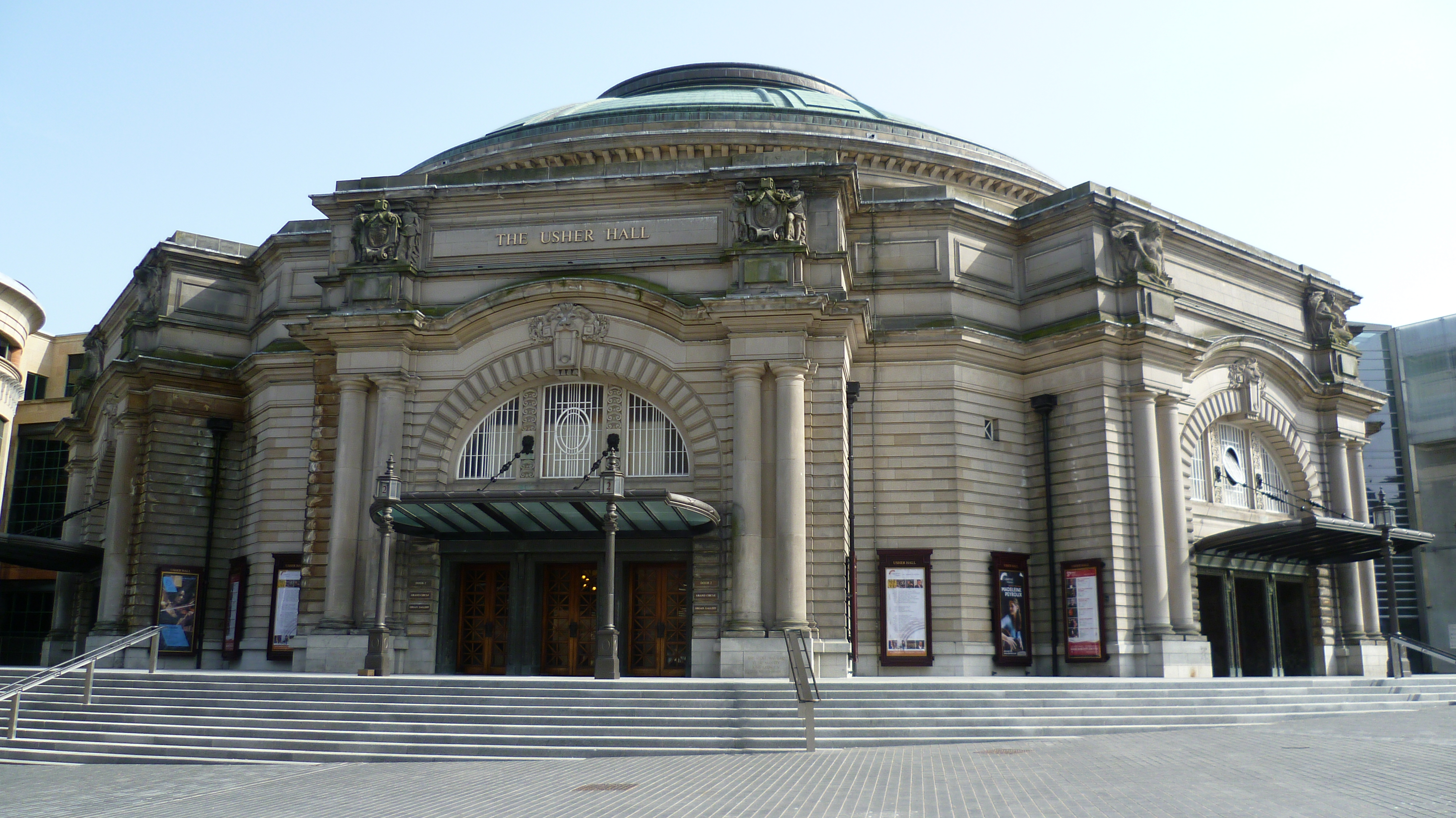
Usher Hall, Edinburgh 1911-1914

Stockdale Harrison (1846-10 November 1914) FRIBA was an architect based in Leicester best known for Usher Hall, Edinburgh.

== History ==
Stockdale Harrison was born in November 1846, the son of William Harrison (1813-1873) timber merchant, and Mary Everard (1820-1869). He was christened on 2 December 1846 in St George's Church, Leicester.

In 1863 Stockdale Harrison was articled to James Bird of Leicester. In 1868 he moved to become an assistant to George Somers Leigh Clarke of London. On 1 October 1869 he was made a Freeman and Apprentice of Leicester and he set up in private practice, initially in Hotel street and then at 7 St Martins. In 1882 he became an Associate of the RIBA; in 1890 he became FRIBA. Between 1890 and 1892 he was President of the Leicestershire and Rutland Society of Architects

He designed churches in the gothic revival style, and was also responsible for domestic architecture in the vernacular revival style mainly in Leicester, but also in other areas of the East Midlands.

He married artist Marianne Bailey (1847-1923), daughter of James Bailey and Mary Ann nee Musk, on 4 September 1872 at St Paul's Church, Leicester, and their children were:

- James Stockdale Harrison (1874-1952)
- Shirley Harrison (1875-1961)
- Marianne Harrison (1878-1971)
- Florence Harrison (b. 1878)
- (Captain) Everard Harrison (1880-1917)
- Gregory Harrison (1883-1889)
- Priscilla Harrison (1885-1975)
- Margaret Harrison (1891)

Stockdale Harrison was joined in business by his sons James (1892) and Shirley (1904), and from 1904 the business operated under the name Stockdale Harrison and Sons.

Stockdale Harrison died on 10 November 1914 leaving an estate valued at £22,529 7s 10d (equivalent to £2,730,967 in 2023) and the business continued under the management of his sons James and Shirley.

== Works ==
- Conway Buildings, Grey Friars, Leicester 1878
- Church School, St Saviour’s, Leicester 1882-83
- St Martin’s Church, Desford 1884. Extension and restoration
- Infirmary Wards, Workhouse, Fox Hill, Leicester 1886
- Holy Cross Schools, New Walk, Leicester 1886 - 1887
- Spinney Hill Park Lodge, Leicester 1888
- Westcotes Free Library 1889
- 15 Elms Road, Leicester
- 146-154 Upper New Walk, Leicester
- Wentworth, London Road, Leicester
- Newstead, Birstall Hill Park Road, Birstall
- Vaughan College, Leicester (replaced in 1967)
- Abingdon House, Springfield Road
- Four Gables, Elms Road, Leicester
- 27 Elms Road, Leicester
- Abbey Pumping Station, Leicester 1889-91
- Vestry Street Baths, Leicester 1891
- Grovesnor Rooms, 16 Halford Street, Leicester 1892
- St Thomas' Church, South Wigston 1892 - 1893 with tower of 1901
- Freemen’s Cottages, Wigston Road, Leicester 1893
- Stockdale House, 18 Stoneygate Road, Leicester 1897
- 10-16 Stoneygate Road, Leicester 1897
- 1-7 Albert Road, Leicester 1897
- Redcliffe, The Park Estate, Nottingham 1897-98
- St Stephen’s Church, North Evington 1897-98
- Hastings House, Stoughton Drive South, 1902
- Middlemeade 1904 (by Shirley Stockdale Harrison)
- Saracen’s Head, Hotel Street/Market Place, Leicester 1904
- Premier Works, Melton Road, Belgrave, Leicester 1910
- Rectory, Sawday Street, Leicester 1911
- Usher Hall, Edinburgh 1911-1914
- Britannia Mills, Markeaton Street, Derby 1912-13
- De Montfort Hall, Leicester 1913
- St Guthlac’s Church, South Knighton, Leicester 1912
- 14 Woodland Avenue, Stoneygate, Leicester 1913
