= Powlesland and Mason (railway shunting contractors) =

Powlesland and Mason were a company that provided steam locomotives and crews for shunting within Swansea Docks. The first name has sometimes been spelt "Powesland" and it is uncertain which spelling is correct.

== Early history ==
Powlesland and Mason (P&M) were a Swansea-based firm that existed between 1903 and the merger of their railway operations into the Great Western Railway (GWR) on 1 January 1924. As at 1 January 1924, P&M were operating nine steam locomotives on shunting activities within Swansea docks, supplementing the locomotives of the Swansea Harbour Trust.

== Operations under Great Western Railway ownership ==
The GWR continued to use the ex-P&M steam locomotives for shunting and short-trip freight train workings throughout the GWR's existence. Latterly, some P&M locomotives were based at locomotive sheds away from the immediate vicinity of Swansea docks, including Danygraig shed, to the east of Swansea, which was located to the west of Jersey Marine railway station.

== Locomotives operated ==
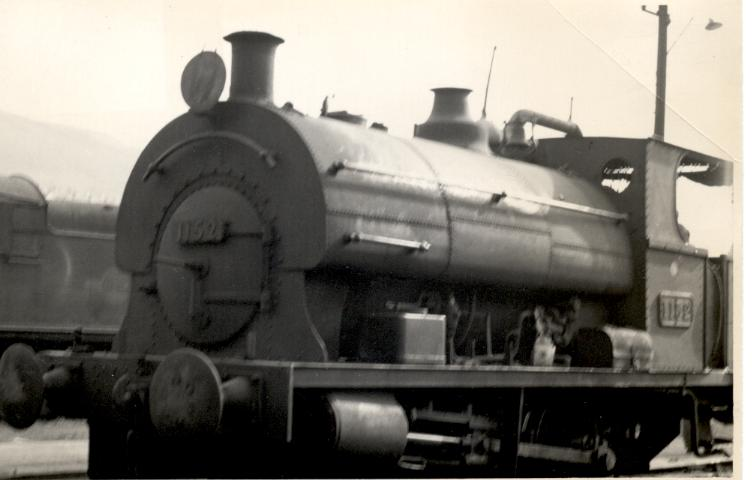
Powlesland & Mason Peckett 0-4-0ST GWR No. 1152 (P&M No.12) at Danygraig loco shed (Swansea) in May 1960

Powlesland and Mason utilised a fleet of nine 0-4-0ST saddle tank shunting locomotives on their railway duties within Swansea docks. The locos had been built between 1874 and 1916. The oldest, P&M No.7, was a former Raven Class broad gauge locomotive constructed for the South Devon Railway Company in 1874, and was sold by the GWR to P&M in 1906.

The P&M engines had been built by five different firms of locomotive constructors: Peckett and Sons (4 locos); Brush Electrical (2 locos); Avonside (1 loco); Andrew Barclay (1 loco); and Hawthorn Leslie and Company (1 loco).

== Preservation ==
Four of the locomotives survived to be taken into ownership of British Railways Western Region in 1948 and the last to be withdrawn from service was Peckett-built BR No. 1152 (P&M No. 12; GWR No. 935) in 1963.

Today, only one Powlesland and Mason locomotive survives in preservation. This is P&M loco No.6 (GWR No. 921) built by Brush in 1903/06 and sold by the GWR in 1929 to a private operator for further service. It is on public display, but not operational, at the Mountsorrel Railway in Leicestershire wearing No. 921.
