= Rebecca Wakefield =

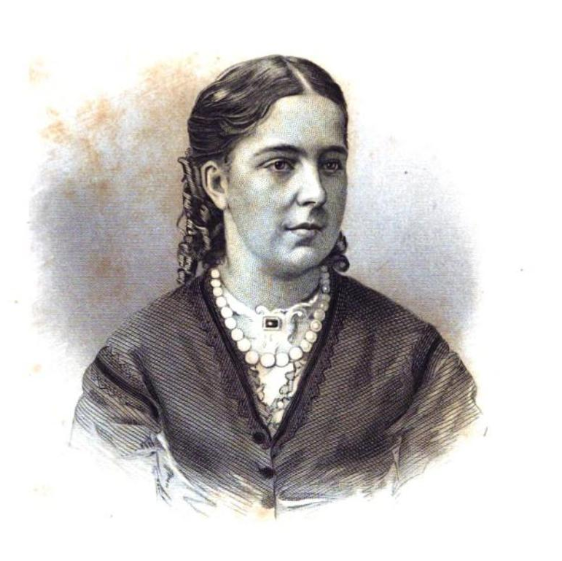
- Born: 19 August 1844; Mountsorrel
- Died: 16 July 1873 (aged 28); East Africa
- Occupation: missionary
- Spouse: Rev Thomas Wakefield

Rebecca Wakefield née Brewin (19 August 1844 – 16 July 1873) was a British Methodist missionary wife who worked and died in what is now Kenya.

== Life ==
Wakefield was born in 1844 in the Leicestershire village of Mountsorrel. Her parents were Rebecca (born Wale) and Simeon Brewin (d. 1857). Her father was a Methodist preacher and a hosier and draper. Her mother was a baker's daughter who was involved with temperance and Methodism in their well-to-do community. She was the youngest child and had three elder brothers.

She had accepted a proposal of marriage from an old school friend who was a missionary in Ceylon but before the marriage could be arranged he died.

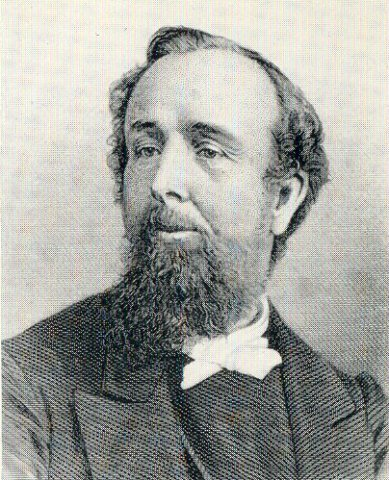
Rev Thomas Wakefield

In May 1869 she attended the United Methodist Free Churches Missionary Society annual meeting where she met Thomas Wakefield who had outlived other missionaries to lead a mission at Ribe in East Africa. This was north of Mombasa in what is now Kenya. By the end of the year they were married and on 24 February 1870 they set out for East Africa. She was pregnant and for nearly 100 days she was on board a small boat sailing to Zanzibar. Nellie Wakefield was born on 16 October 1870 at Zanzibar and they made their new home in a stone-built two-room house.

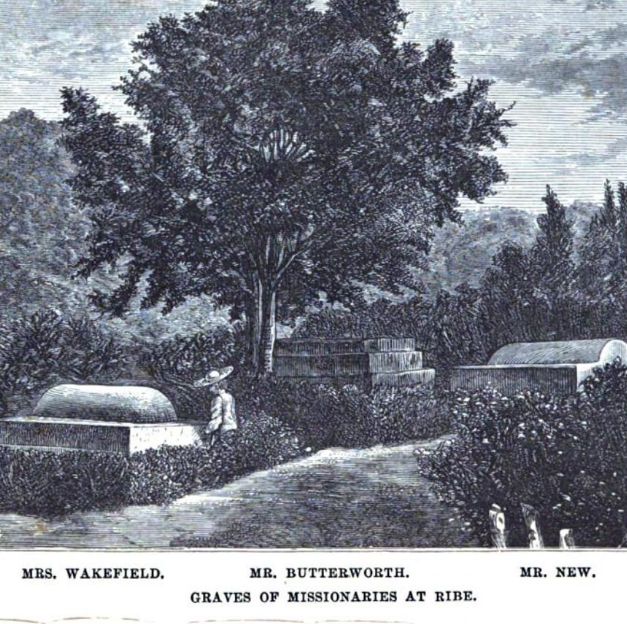
Graves of Rebecca Wakefield, Edmund Butterworth and New

She wrote letters home where she complained about the local wildlife. Leopards would take their foal and goats and the ants and rats would eat away at woodwork including the loss of the mission's piano. However she was able to dispense medicine, teach and preach. She taught children how to sew and to sing praises until she was 29. On 8 June 1873 their son Bertie was born but the two of them never recovered. Both she and her son were buried in the mission's graveyard in July. The same graveyard also accepted Reverend Charles New, who had climbed to Kilimanjaro's snow line, when he died in 1879 and Reverend Edmund Butterworth who had arrived with woodworking tools that were first used to create his coffin.

== Death and legacy ==
Wakefield died in East Africa in 1873. Her brother Robert wrote her biography, Memoirs of Rebecca Wakefield, wife of the Rev. T. Wakefield, United Methodist Free Churches missionary in eastern Africa, which was published in 1876. Thomas Wakefield married again to Elizabeth Sommers in 1882. He was to return to England where he was asked to be a Fellow of the Royal Geographical Society in 1889. He died in 1901.
