= St Thomas' Church, South Wigston =

Coordinates: 52°34′48.28″N 1°8′9.74″W

St Thomas’ Church, South Wigston
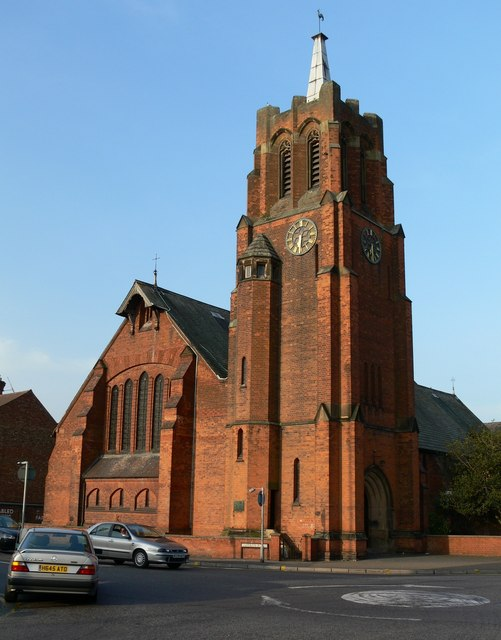
- St Thomas the Apostle, South Wigston

- Location within Leicestershire
- OS grid reference: SP 58646 98346
- Location: South Wigston
- Country: England
- Denomination: Church of England
- Website: wigstonbenefice.org.uk

History
- Dedication: Thomas the Apostle
- Consecrated: 2 February 1893

Architecture
- Heritage designation: Grade II* listed
- Architect: Stockdale Harrison
- Groundbreaking: 26 July 1892

Specifications
- Length: 128 feet (39 m)
- Width: 44 feet (13 m)

Administration
- Diocese: Diocese of Leicester
- Archdeaconry: Leicester
- Deanery: Gartree (2nd deanery)
- Parish: South Wigston

St Thomas’ Church, South Wigston is a Grade II* listed parish church in the Church of England in South Wigston, Leicestershire.

== History ==
The foundation stone was laid on 26 July 1892 by Thomas Ingram and it was consecrated on 2 February 1893 by Rt. Revd. Mandell Creighton the Bishop of Peterborough.

It was built in brick with a Westmorland slate roof by Henry Bland to the designs of the architect Stockdale Harrison at a cost of £3,600 (equivalent to £399,961 in 2025). It was 128 feet (39 m) long and 44 feet (13 m) wide.

The tower was added in 1901.

== Parish status ==
The church is in a joint benefice with

- All Saints' Church, Wigston Magna
- St Wistan's Church, Wigston Magna

== Organ ==
The church contains a pipe organ dating from 1895 by Stephen Taylor of Leicester. It was paid for by Thomas Ingram at a cost of £500 (equivalent to £56,842 in 2025) and dedicated on 26 September 1875 by Bishop Mitchinson. A specification of the organ can be found on the National Pipe Organ Register.

== The Bells ==
A peal of eight bells was cast in 1901 by John Taylor & Co. On 26 December 1904, seven ringers set a new world record when they rang a peal of 17,184 double Norwich Court Bob, breaking the record set in 1898 at Kidlington by the Oxford Guild. One of the ringers broke down after 10 hour 35 minutes.
