= Abbey Pumping Station =

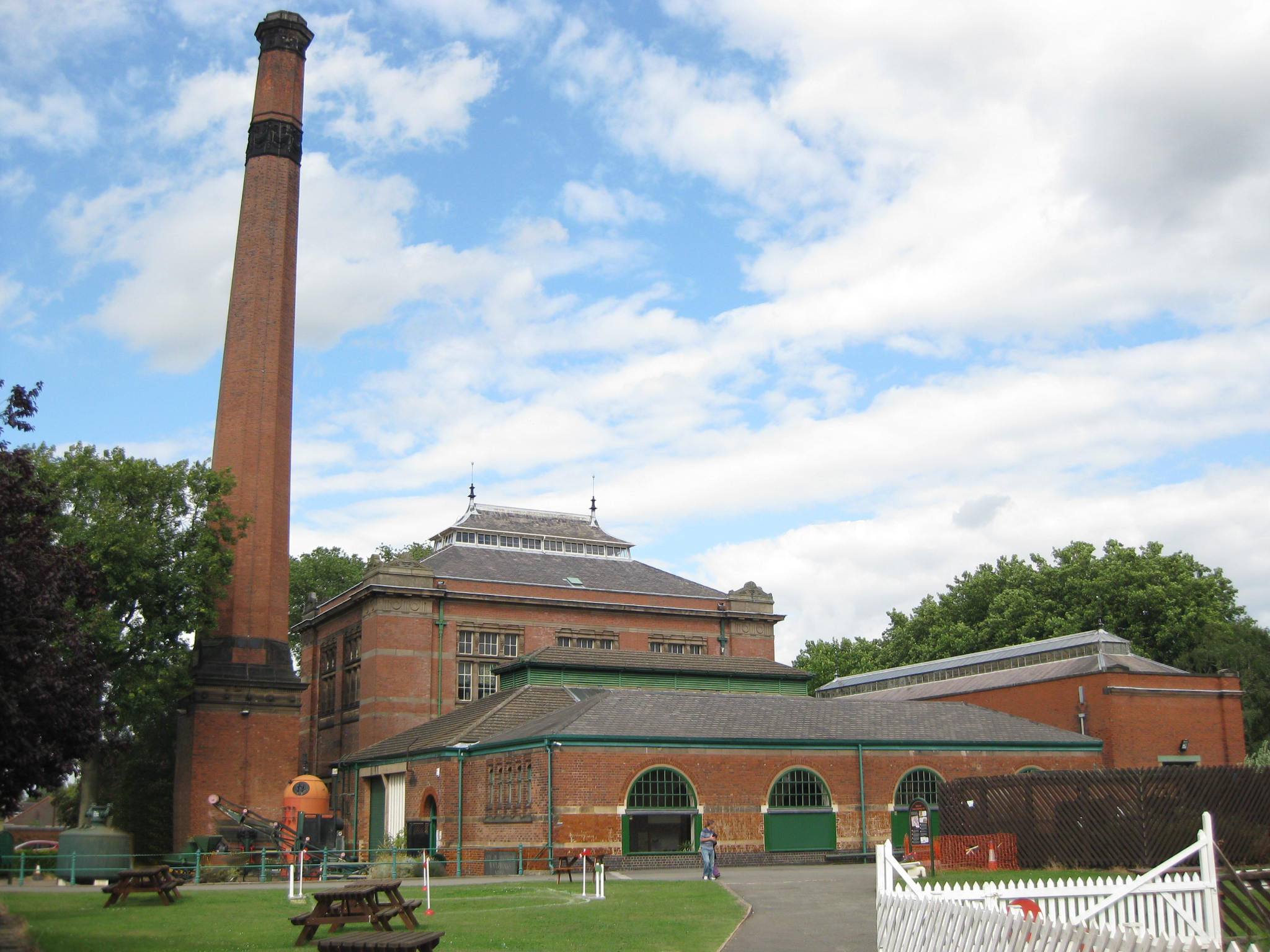
- Abbey Pumping Station, Leicester Museum of Science and Technology

- Location of the Museum in Leicester
- Established: 1972
- Location: Leicester, United Kingdom
- Coordinates: 52°39′18″N 1°07′50″W
- Type: Science and Technology Museum
- Key holdings: Steam engines, 'interactive toilets', steam shovel, buses
- Architect: Stockdale Harrison
- Website: abbey-pumping-station

The Abbey Pumping Station is a museum of science and technology in Leicester, England, on Corporation Road, next to the National Space Centre. With four working steam-powered beam engines from its time as a sewage pumping station, it also houses exhibits for transport, public health, light and optics, toys and civil engineering.

== Sewage pumping station ==
The building was constructed in 1891 by Leicester Corporation on the north side of Leicester, alongside the River Soar, as a pumping station used to pump the town's sewage to the sewage farm at Beaumont Leys. The grand Victorian building, designed by Stockdale Harrison (Leicester architect) in 1890, houses four Woolf compound beam engines built by Gimson and Company of Leicester. The first attempt to respond to the population's sewage disposal was in 1850 when piped water made water closets possible, and Thomas Wicksteed designed and built sewers leading to a sedimentation and deodorisation treatment works on the northern, downstream, edge of the town. Limited capacity and high costs meant that a Pail closet system continued to be used for poorer neighbourhoods. As the town expanded so did the problems of pollution in the River Soar from the treatment works. Disposal of the night soil from the pail closets, via railway wagons and canal barges, caused complaints of smell and pollution. A new solution was needed and the answer was to pump everything to a sewage farm on higher ground at Beaumont Leys. The Abbey Pumping Station replaced a smaller facility at Knighton. The pumping station was fed by two main trunk sewers, one from the East of the city that ran under Bruin Street and then under the Grand Union Canal, and another that ran along the route of Abbey Lane and then across fields. By 1912, the 2,000-acre sewage farm and pumping capacity of up to 20 million gallons a day was insufficient to meet the needs of the growing city, with 130 miles of new sewers built since the station opened, and extensions were agreed. In 1939 a ram pump was installed, reportedly the largest of its kind in Europe at the time. The station continued pumping Leicester's sewage until 1964, when electric pumps took over, and within a few years the Wanlip Sewage Treatment plant took over and the pumping station was no longer needed.

== Museum ==
In 1972 the building re-opened as a museum of science and technology, run by Leicestershire Museums. The huge beam engines were retained intact, and were gradually restored to full working order. It is one of several historic pumping stations which have been preserved. Leicester City Council became a unitary authority in 1997 and the Abbey Pumping Station is one of the museums that is within their jurisdiction.

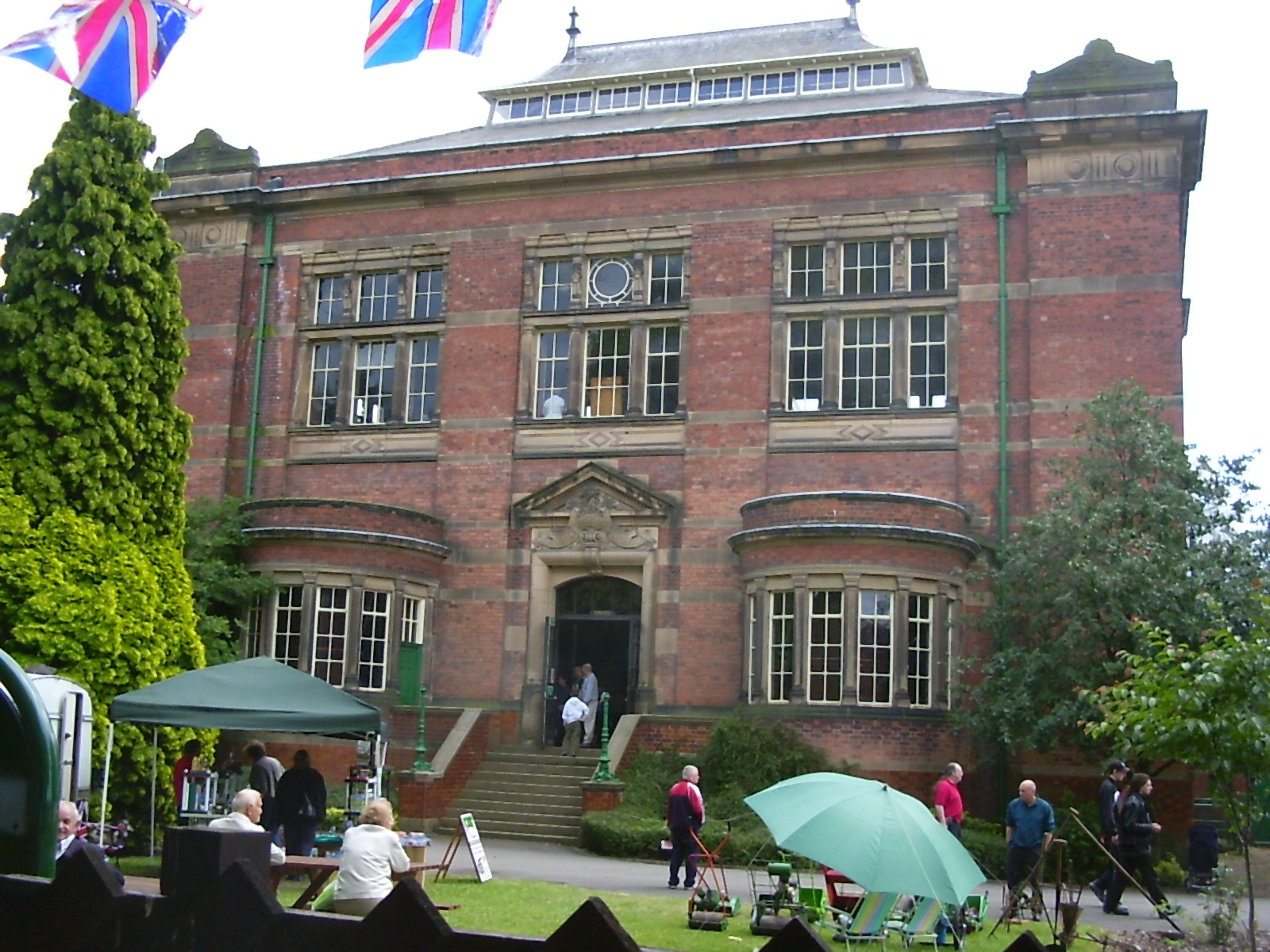
Building viewed from Northeast

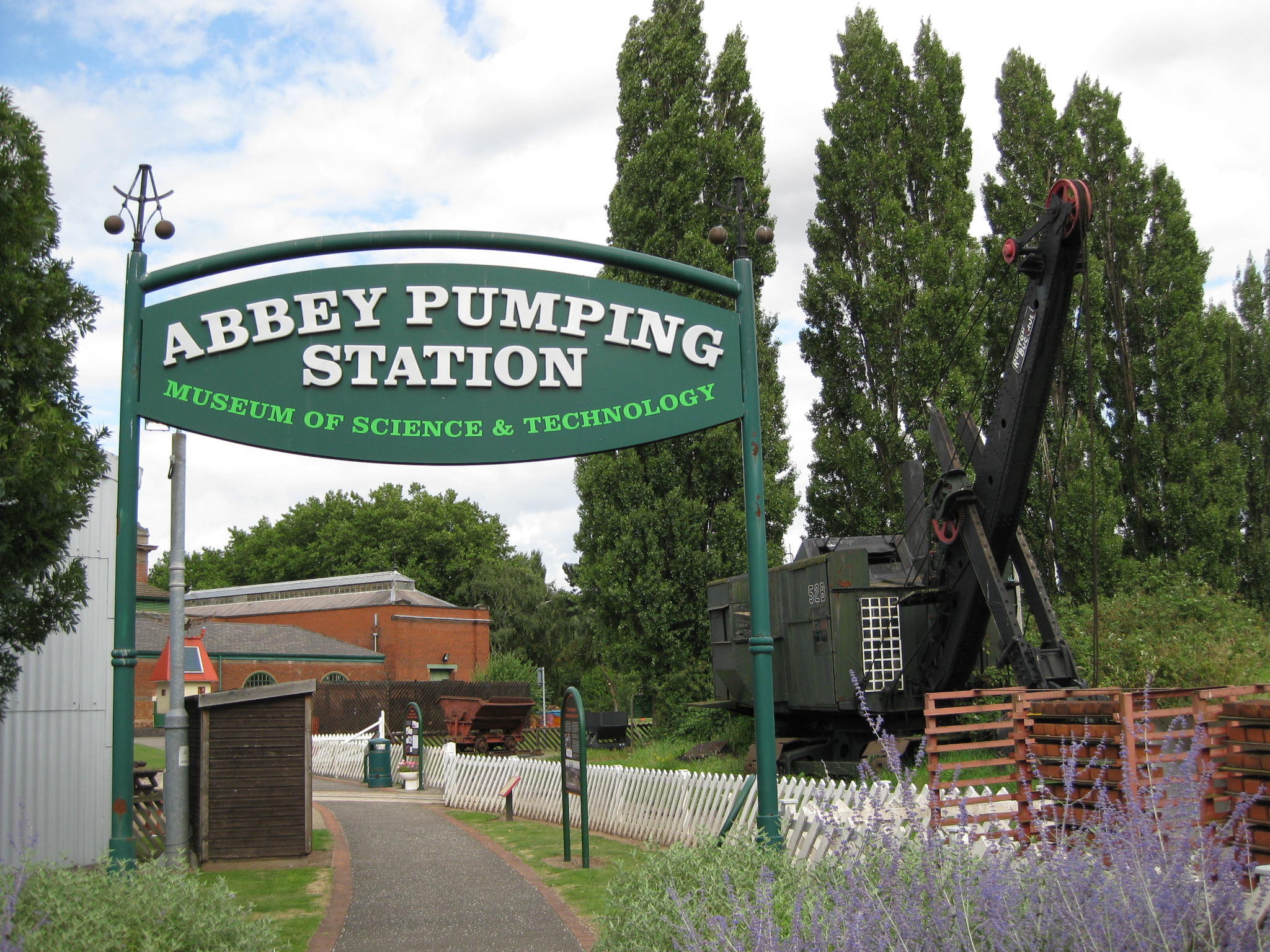
Abbey Pumping Station entrance

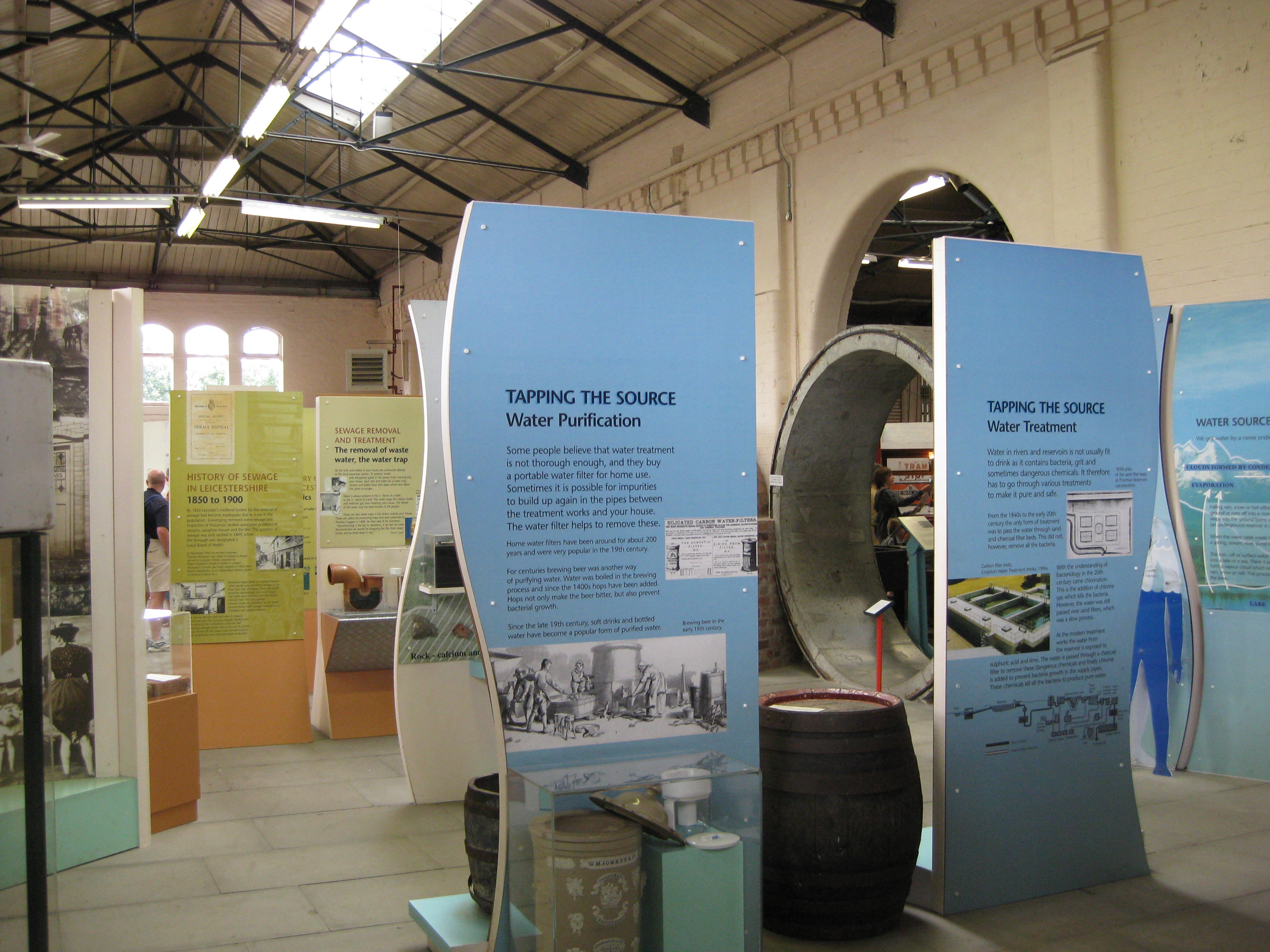
One of the educational displays

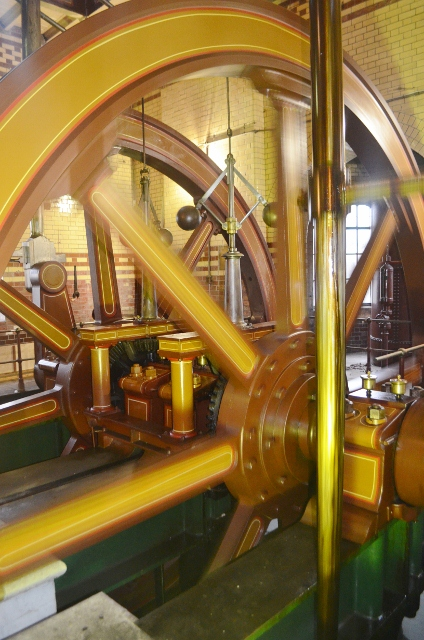
Beam engines

== Displays ==
The steam engines (see below) which drive the sewage pumps can be seen. In addition, there is combination of informative educational displays (mainly about water and sewage), an old-fashioned film theatre, and collections of artifacts and pictures ranging from domestic appliances to trams. An eclectic collection of larger items of industrial archeology is in the grounds. This includes a narrow-gauge railway and some transport items.

== Beam engines ==
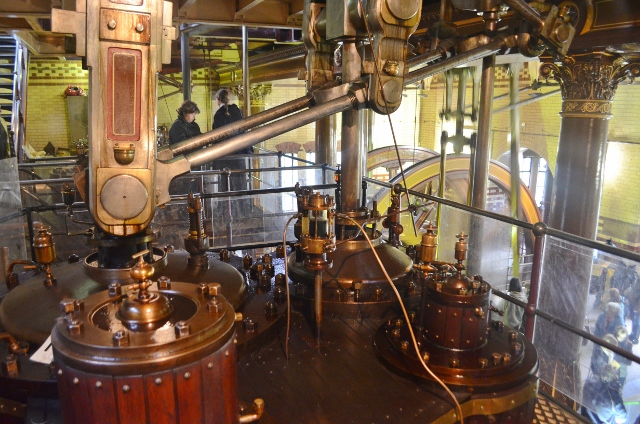
Cylinder heads in late 2011

The four steam engines were built in Leicester by Gimson and Company and today are rare examples of Woolf compound rotative beam engines. At the time these engines were built they were considered an old-fashioned but very well-established design. The engines are large examples. The cylinders are 30 inches (76 cm) x 69.5 inches (177 cm) and 48 inches (120 cm) x 102 inches (260 cm). The cast-iron flywheels are 21 feet (6.4 m) diameter and the beams are of plain steel plate construction and 28 feet (8.5 m) long. The engines are of 200 indicated horsepower each.

These engines are rated at 200 hp, at 12–19 rpm, of which they pumped 208,000 imperial gallons of sewage an hour (263 L/s).

All four engines have been restored to working condition by a team of volunteers: the Leicester Museums Technology Association. It is the only engine house in the world where you can see four working examples of the same beam engine in one building.

Current projects in the engine house are the ongoing maintenance of the latest restored engine, No.1 (restored over a period of 4 years by the volunteers).

== Museum collections ==
The Pumping Station is normally open Daily from 11am - 4:30pm. Engines can be seen in steam at various steam days along with other steam and early internal combustion exhibits.

== Transport collection ==
The Museum has a narrow-gauge railway which is normally operated by Leonard, an 0-4-0ST 2 ft (610 mm) narrow-gauge locomotive built by W.G. Bagnall, Stafford as works number 2087 in 1918, but four diesel locomotives – two Simplex, one Lister and one Ruston – are also available if needed.

There is also a collection of vintage road vehicles which are operated on selected days. Exhibits include several fire engines, buses (see below), an 1894 Aveling and Porter steam roller, several diesel rollers, a Bedford fish and chips van, an ex Leicester Corporation Tramways tower wagon and an Austin K2 brewery dray lorry with ales.

Buses

- 1939 Leicester City Transport: AEC Renown 0664 CBC 921. Fully restored and operational.
- 1958 Delaine Coaches: Leyland Tiger Cub PSUC1/2 MTL 750. Fully restored and operational.
- 1958 Leicester City Transport: Leyland Titan PD3/1 TBC 164. Fully restored and operational.

== Paranormal ==
The Ghost of an Engineer who died after falling from a great height whilst working at the Pumping Station in 1890 is said to Haunt the Building.

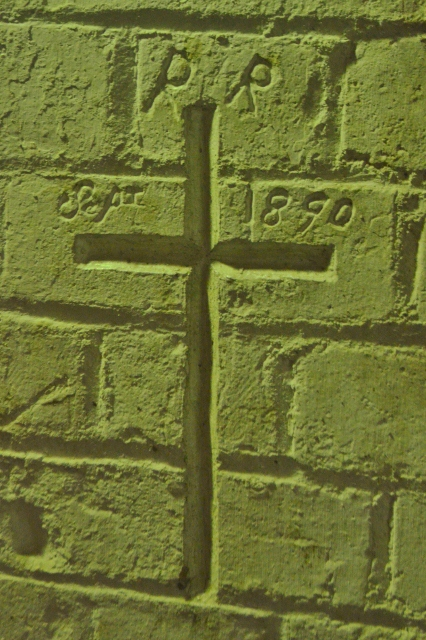
Memorial for the Deceased Engineer at the spot that he fell to

== See also ==
- Gimson and Company
- Cambridge Museum of Technology
- Prickwillow Museum
- Stretham Old Engine
- Anson Engine Museum
- Nottingham Industrial Museum
