= Charles Alexander Calvert =

British actor and theatre manager

- Born: 28 February 1828; London
- Died: 12 June 1879 (aged 51)
- Education: King's College School
- Occupations: actor, manager
- Known for: Theatre Royal, Manchester, Prince's Theatre, Manchester

Charles Alexander Calvert (28 February 1828 – 12 June 1879) was a British actor and theatre manager known for arranging new productions of the Shakespearean canon featuring elaborate staging and what were considered historically accurate sets and costumes.

== Early life ==
Calvert was born in London on 28 February 1828, and educated at King's College School. After leaving, he spent some time in the office of a London solicitor and in a mercer's business in St. Paul's Churchyard; but before long he was drawn to the stage, having derived a first impulse towards it from the plays of Shakespeare produced at Sadler's Wells Theatre by Samuel Phelps, from whom Calvert afterwards modestly declared that he had learnt all his art.

== Acting career ==
He first acted professionally in 1852, at Weymouth Theatre, under the management of Edward Askew Sothern, famous for creating the role of Lord Dundreary. Then he played leading parts at Southampton and in South Wales, until in about 1855 he joined the company of Messrs. Shepherd and Creswick at the Surrey Theatre in London, where he played leading youthful parts of a "legitimate" type. A year after his arrival in London he married the actress Adelaide Ellen Biddies, who went on to continue her stage success in her own right as Adelaide Calvert. They had eight children, of whom five (three sons and two daughters) followed their parents' profession, including Louis Calvert, their third son.

In 1859, Calvert became stage-manager and principal actor of the Theatre Royal, Manchester. Five years later in 1864, by then manager of the newly built Prince's Theatre, Calvert began the series of Shakespearean "revivals" which were the chief efforts of his professional life. Convinced that Shakespeare could be "made to pay," he consistently produced plays with elaborate attention to scenery, costume, and every other element of stage effect. The Shakespearean plays revived by Calvert were the following:

- The Tempest (1864), with which the Prince's Theatre opened, and which proved a signal success
- Antony and Cleopatra (1866)
- The Winter's Tale (1869)
- Richard III (1870)
- The Merchant of Venice, with Arthur Sullivan's music (1871)
- Henry V (1872)
- Twelfth Night (1873)
- Henry IV, part 2 (1874)

From a draft in his handwriting it appears to have been his intention, had his connection with the Prince's Theatre continued, to crown the series by an arrangement of the three parts of Henry VI together with Richard III in three plays, under the title of The Houses of York and Lancaster. Some of Calvert's less elaborate productions included Byron's Manfred (1867) and other plays by Shakespeare. He generally had a good "stock" company, in which several actors and actresses of mark received their training. The financial viability of the ventures he was associated with seems to have varied. The Prince's Theatre passed into the hands of a company in 1868 who quickly rebuilt it, allowing Calvert to fulfill his promise of providing "dramatic entertainment of the highest class". His connection with the theatre ended in 1875, shortly before which Calvert had staged a very successful production of Henry V in New York. After leaving the Prince's Theatre he produced, at the Theatre Royal, Manchester, Henry VIII in 1877, for which he commissioned a new score for the fifth act by Arthur Sullivan. He also staged Byron's Sardanapalus at Liverpool and at the Theatre Royal, Manchester, and superintended a "replica" at Booth's Theatre in New York.

== Later years ==
His last years were migratory, spent at the head of a travelling company which appeared in Manchester and at other places. Towards the end the state of his health, which had given way four years previously, persuaded him to retire to Hammersmith, London where he died on 12 June 1879. The genuine admiration felt for him in Manchester had been shown on the occasion of his first departure for New York by a public banquet (4 January 1875). His funeral at Brooklands cemetery, near Sale in Cheshire, was made the occasion of a popular demonstration. Later in the year (1 and 2 October) a benefit performance of As You Like It was staged in Manchester for his family.
