= Philip Clissett =

Arts and Crafts artisan

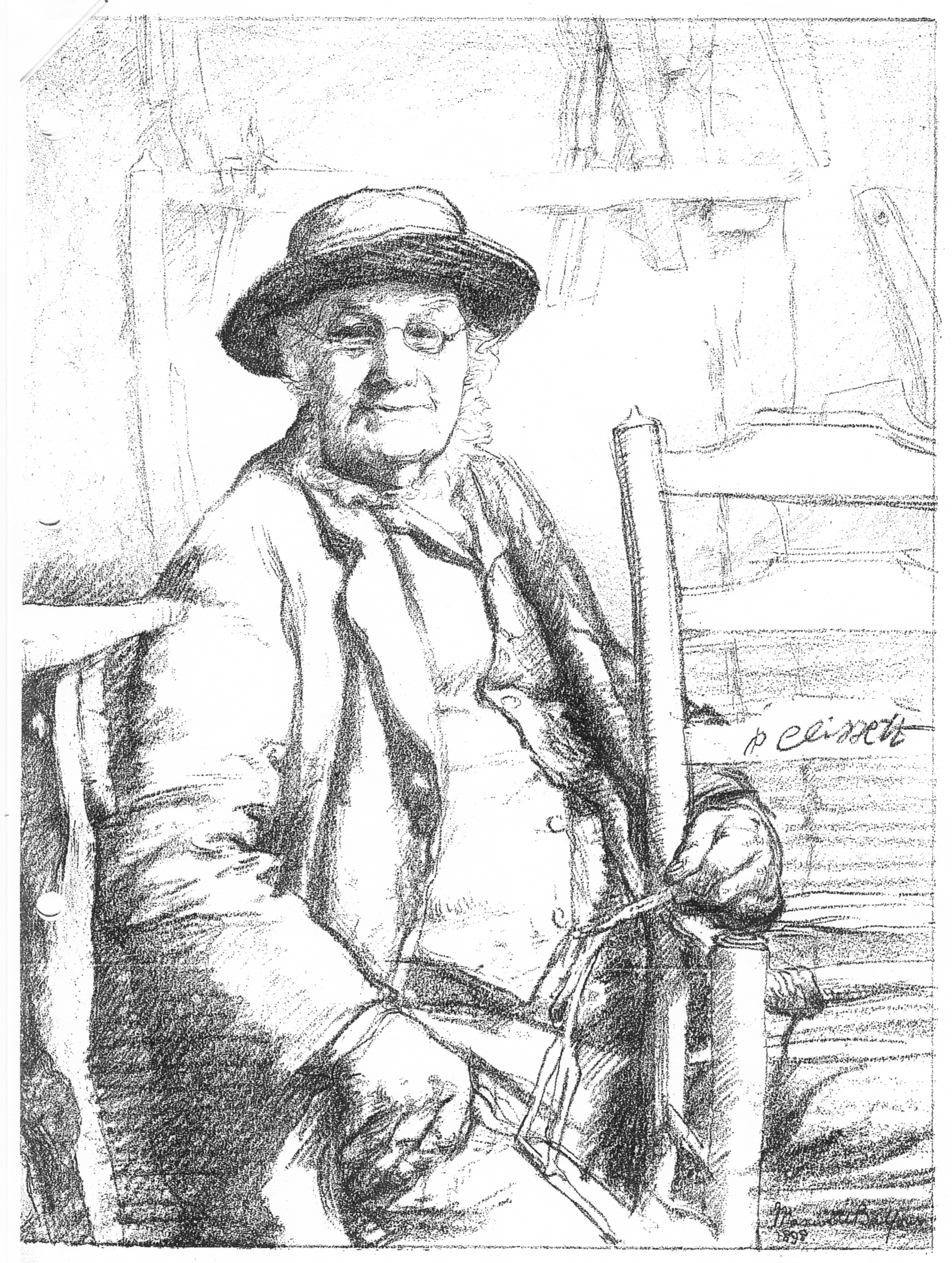
Philip Clissett by Maxwell Balfour, 1898

Philip Clissett (born 8 January 1817, Birtsmorton, Worcestershire, England; died 17 January 1913, Bosbury, Herefordshire) was a Victorian country chairmaker who influenced and inspired the English Arts and Crafts Movement through various architects and designers. His chance meeting with James MacLaren has been described as "undoubtedly a seminal point in the subsequent development of the Arts and Crafts Movement", and led to the furnishing of the meeting room of the Art Workers Guild with a large number of his chairs which can still be seen today. These chairs have been "highly influential", having been "seen by almost everyone involved in art and design from the late 1880s". They particularly influenced Ernest Gimson who, in 1890, spent six weeks with Clissett learning to make ladderback chairs. Clissett's chairs were popular with the Arts and Crafts cognoscenti, and were used by Charles Rennie Mackintosh in early commissions, and by the architectural team of Richard Barry Parker and Raymond Unwin. They were also used as part of the original furnishing of the Passmore Edwards Settlement at Mary Ward House, 5 Tavistock Place, London by the architects A. Dunbar Smith and C. Cecil Brewer.

The following is a list of more or less well-known people who are known to have had Clissett's ladderback chairs amongst the furnishings in their home: Dugald S. MacColl, Sidney Barnsley, Ernest Barnsley, Geoffrey Lupton, Norman Jewson, George Frampton, Emery Walker, Edward Burne-Jones, Philip Burne-Jones, Raymond Unwin, Wilson Bidwell (architect of Letchworth Town Hall, Cecil Hignett (probable; architect of the Spirella Building, Letchworth), Charles Canning Winmill (probable).

By the late 1890s, Clissett was well-known enough for his portrait, by Maxwell Balfour, to appear in a prestigious arts journal, The Quarto.

Clissett made chairs in the West Midlands tradition, turning the parts from fresh, unseasoned ash (Fraxinus excelsior) with a pole lathe. Other parts were sawn and shaped with a drawknife while held in a shave horse. Seats were generally made from an elm board, or from woven rush. While rush-seated ladderback chairs are his most well-known output, he also made spindleback chairs which are often stamped with his initials. Clissett is often referred to as a bodger but this is incorrect as he made entire chairs rather than just turned parts.

Clissett's chairs are now widely collected, and can be found in various museums and collections, including:

- Victoria and Albert Museum, London
- Geffrye Museum, London
- William Morris Gallery, Walthamstow, London
- 7 Hammersmith Terrace, London
- Hunterian Museum and Art Gallery, Glasgow
- New Walk Museum, Leicester
- Cheltenham Art Gallery & Museum, Cheltenham, Gloucestershire
- Worcestershire County Museum, Hartlebury, Worcestershire
- Hereford Museum and Art Gallery, Hereford
- Butcher Row House Museum, Ledbury, Herefordshire
- Rodmarton Manor, nr Cirencester, Gloucestershire
- Marchmont House, nr Greenlaw, Berwickshire
- Los Angeles County Museum of Art, USA
- Crab Tree Farm, Lake Bluff, Illinois, USA
