= Shaving horse =

Traditional bench for woodworking

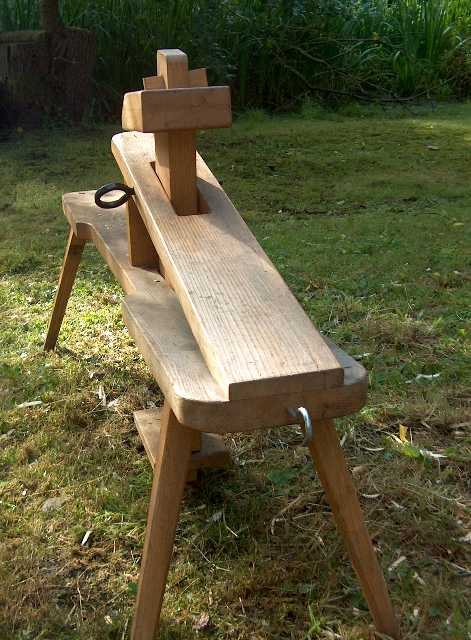
Shaving horse

A shaving horse (also shave horse, shaving bench, or schnitzelbank) is a combination of vice and workbench, used for green woodworking. Typical usage of the shaving horse is to create a round profile along a square piece, such as for a chair leg or to prepare a workpiece for the pole lathe. They are used in crafts such as coopering and bowyery.

== Operation ==
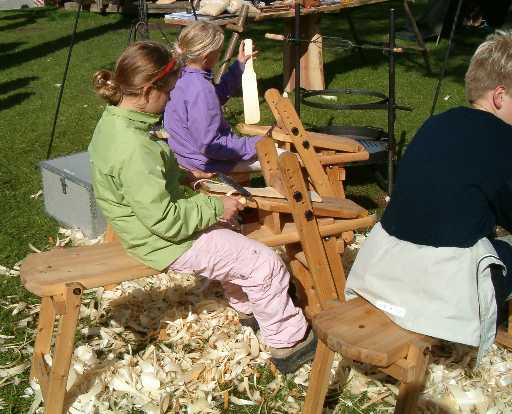
Shaving horses in use

The shavehorse is commonly used in the preparation of stock prior to turning in a lathe, to roughly form cylindrical billets, the intermediate dressing phase between a crudely dressed raw split log and the final lathe work.

As the name "horse" suggests, the worker sits astride the shaving horse. The clamp is operated by the operator pressing their feet onto a treadle bar below. A foot-actuated clamp holds the work piece securely against pulling forces, especially as when shaped with a drawknife or spokeshave.

The shavehorse provides a rapid and sturdy clamp, which allows the operator to use their legs and upper body weight as additional "power" for work. It is considered by some to result in less fatigue than generated by constantly standing.

Shaving green wood with the drawknife or spokeshave along the grain is far quicker and easier work than turning across it. Skilled operators can produce very fine results with a drawknife and shavehorse, requiring minimal lathe finishing.

Straddling a shave horse while carelessly using any dangerous power tool, such as a circular saw, may result in the operator suffering serious bodily injury.

== Construction ==
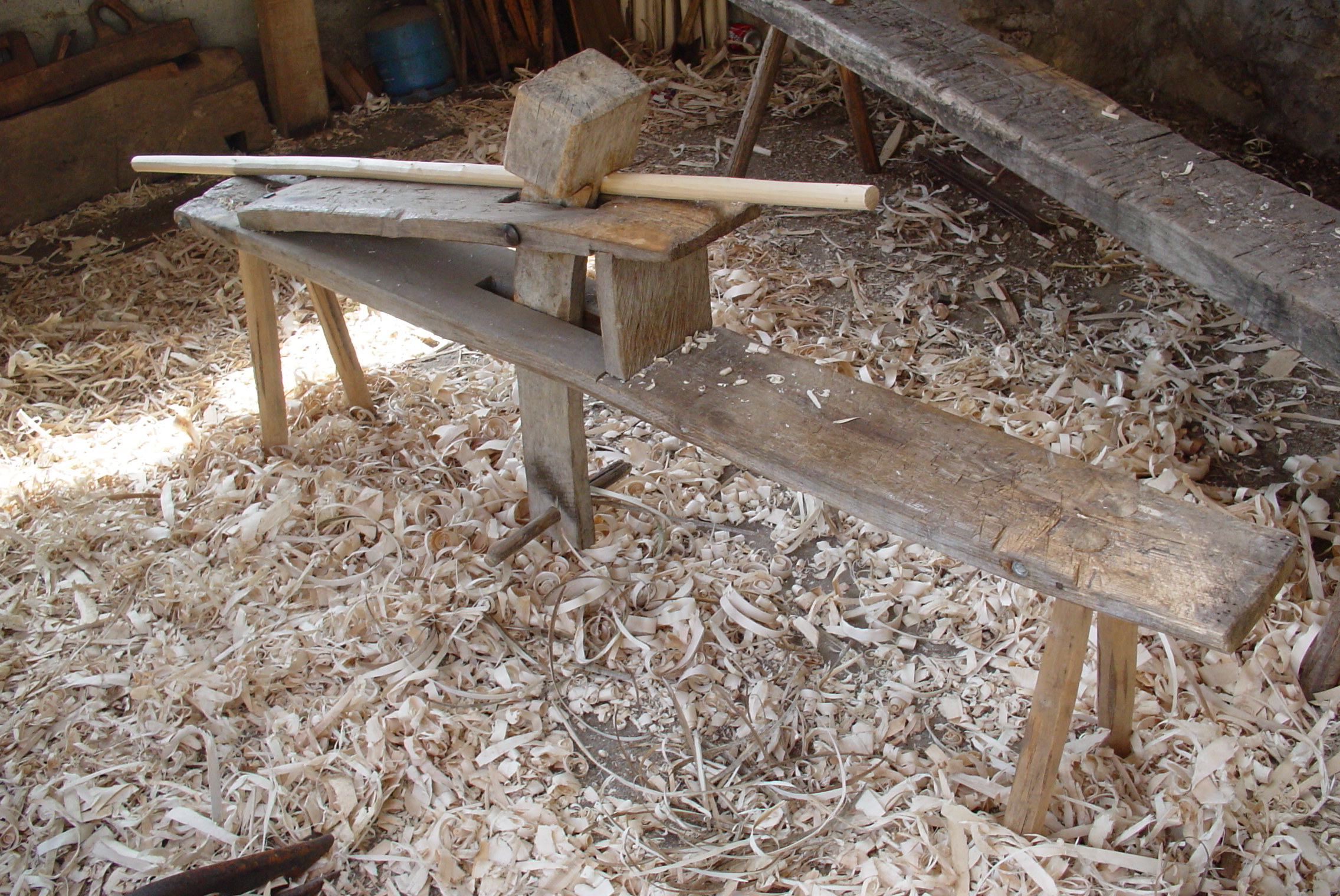
Simple French example, with a stick in place for working

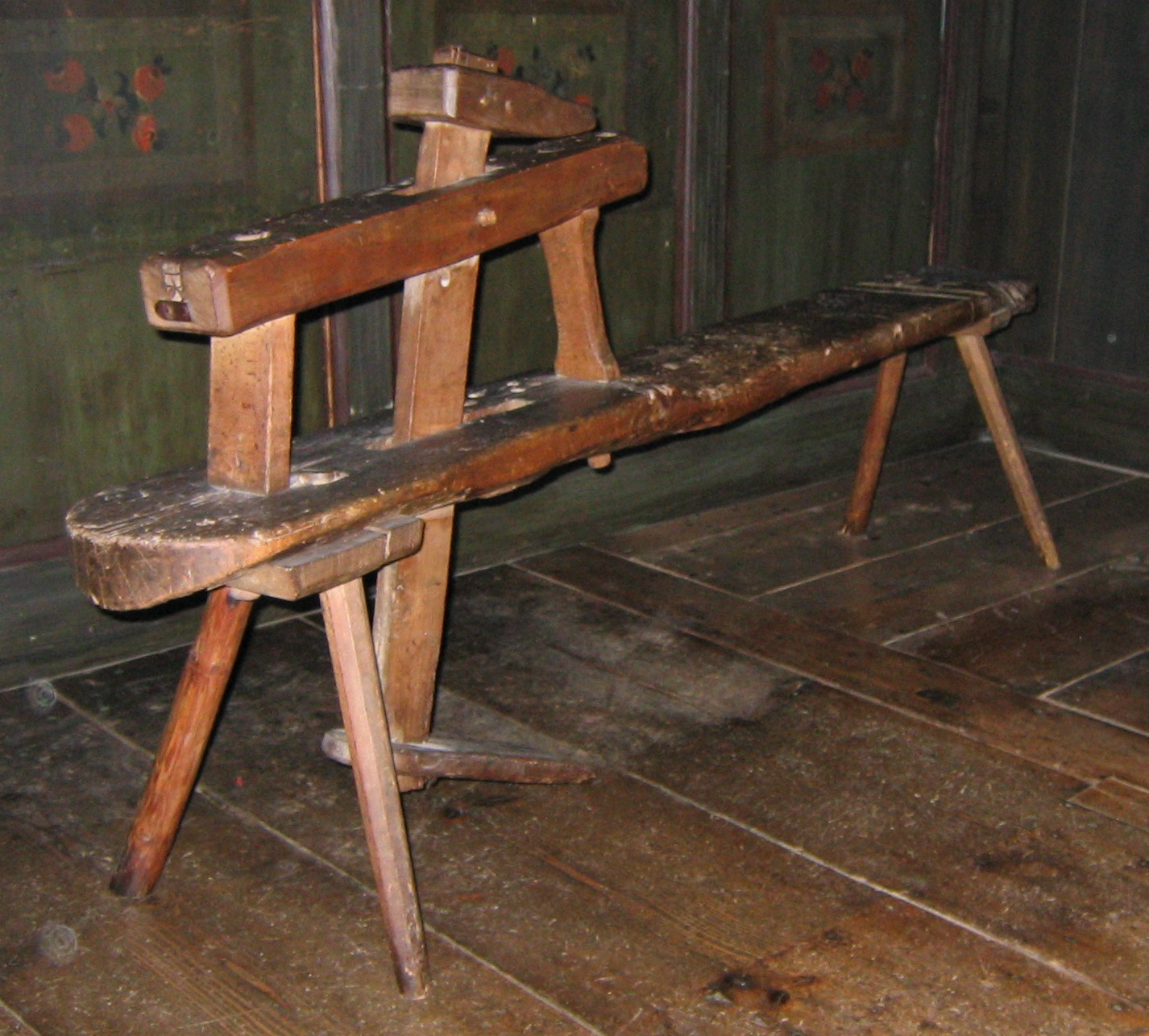
A Black Forest pattern, with more precise clamp

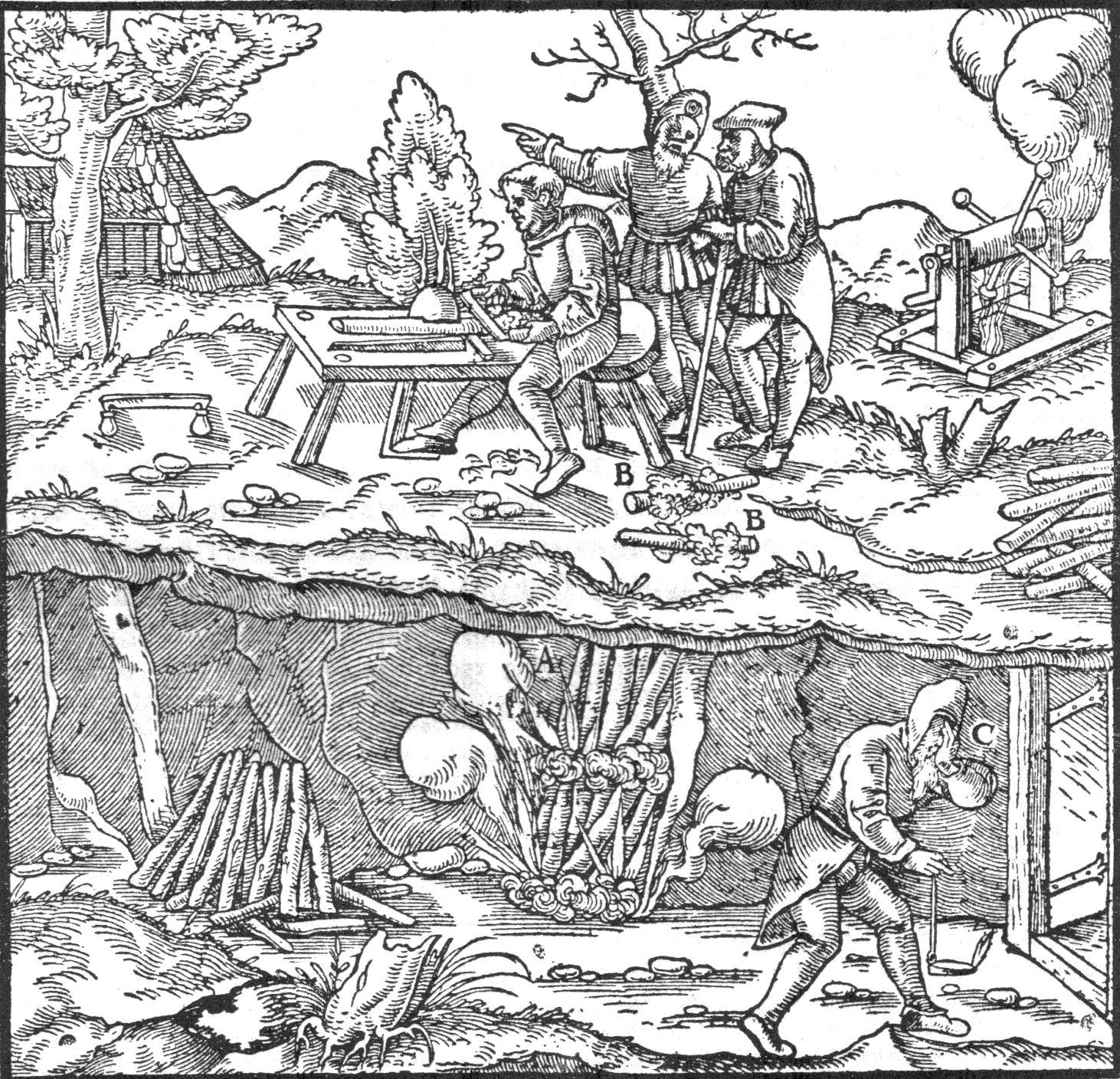
Use of a drawknife and shaving horse from De Re Metallica, a sixteenth-century work on mine technology

The typical clamp is a vertical bar or bars, hinged on a pivot attached to or passing through the bench/seat top. The top of this bar is enlarged into the "horse-", "dog-", or "dumb" head, the part that holds the wood. Some clamps are worked via string or rope, rather than mechanical leverage.

For extra precision and better clamping force, the clamp pivot point may be raised above the bench level on a sub-bench, giving more leverage. These so-called "Black Forest" or German and Swiss shave horses (as pictured) give a longer lever-ratio, creating greater mechanical advantage and thus greater force to trap the wood very securely.

Shave-horses are commonly workshop-made by their user and entirely wooden, though modern screws, washers, metal sleeves and threaded bolts with locking nuts are a very practical addition, allowing re-tightening or adjusting capabilities as necessary.

For the itinerant bodgers, simplicity and lightness of their tools was important, thus the bodgers often created their shave horses from logs found in their woodland plot.

== Criticism ==
Mike Dunbar, a now retired Windsor chairmaker, has posted a blog decrying the use of the shave horse for actual production work: "I do not use a shave horse. When asked why, I answer, 'Why would I impose a pay cut on myself?' That is in effect the result of using this tool. It is so limiting that it slows down the chairmaker and costs him income. I prefer a vise. Using a vise I am standing, not sitting, and I am far more productive and efficient. I work far faster, using less energy." Mike Dunbar was widely criticised for this commentary following the blog post's publication. Most well-known Windsor chairmakers would use and employ a well made shave horse in the production of their chairs to great effect.
