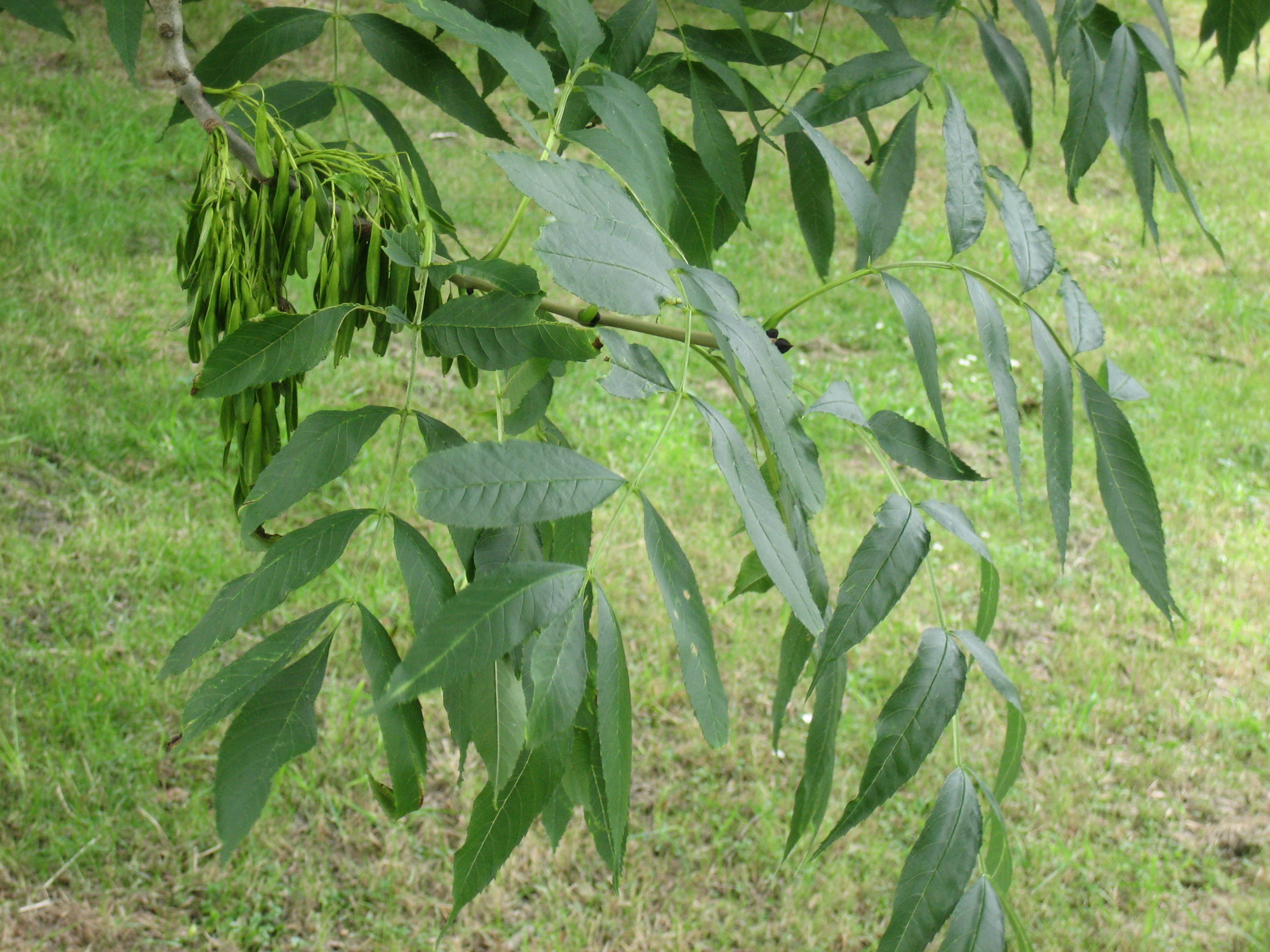
- Foliage and immature fruit

Conservation status
- Near Threatened (IUCN 3.1)

Scientific classification
- Kingdom: Plantae
- Clade: Tracheophytes
- Clade: Angiosperms
- Clade: Eudicots
- Clade: Asterids
- Order: Lamiales
- Family: Oleaceae
- Genus: Fraxinus
- Species: F. excelsior

Binomial name
- Fraxinus excelsior L.
- Distribution map

= Fraxinus excelsior =

European ash

Species of deciduous tree

Fraxinus excelsior, known as the ash, or European ash or common ash to distinguish it from other types of ash, is a flowering plant species in the olive family Oleaceae. It is native throughout mainland Europe east to the Caucasus and Alborz mountains, and west to Great Britain and Ireland, the latter determining its western boundary. The northernmost location is in the Trondheimsfjord region of Norway. The species is widely cultivated and reportedly naturalised in New Zealand and in scattered locales in the United States and Canada. The wood has many uses as it is flexible, workable, strong and lightweight.

== Description ==
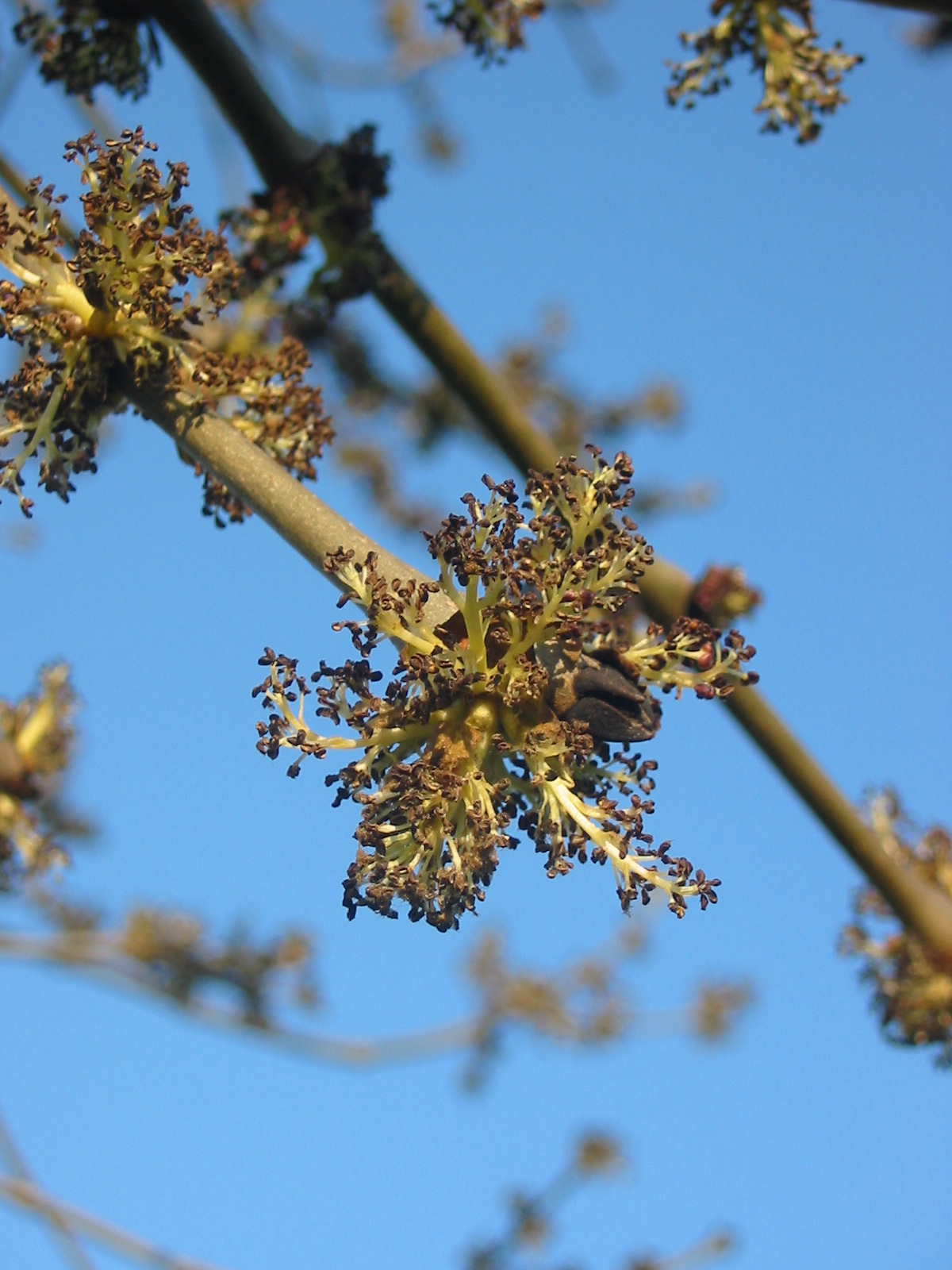
Male flowers

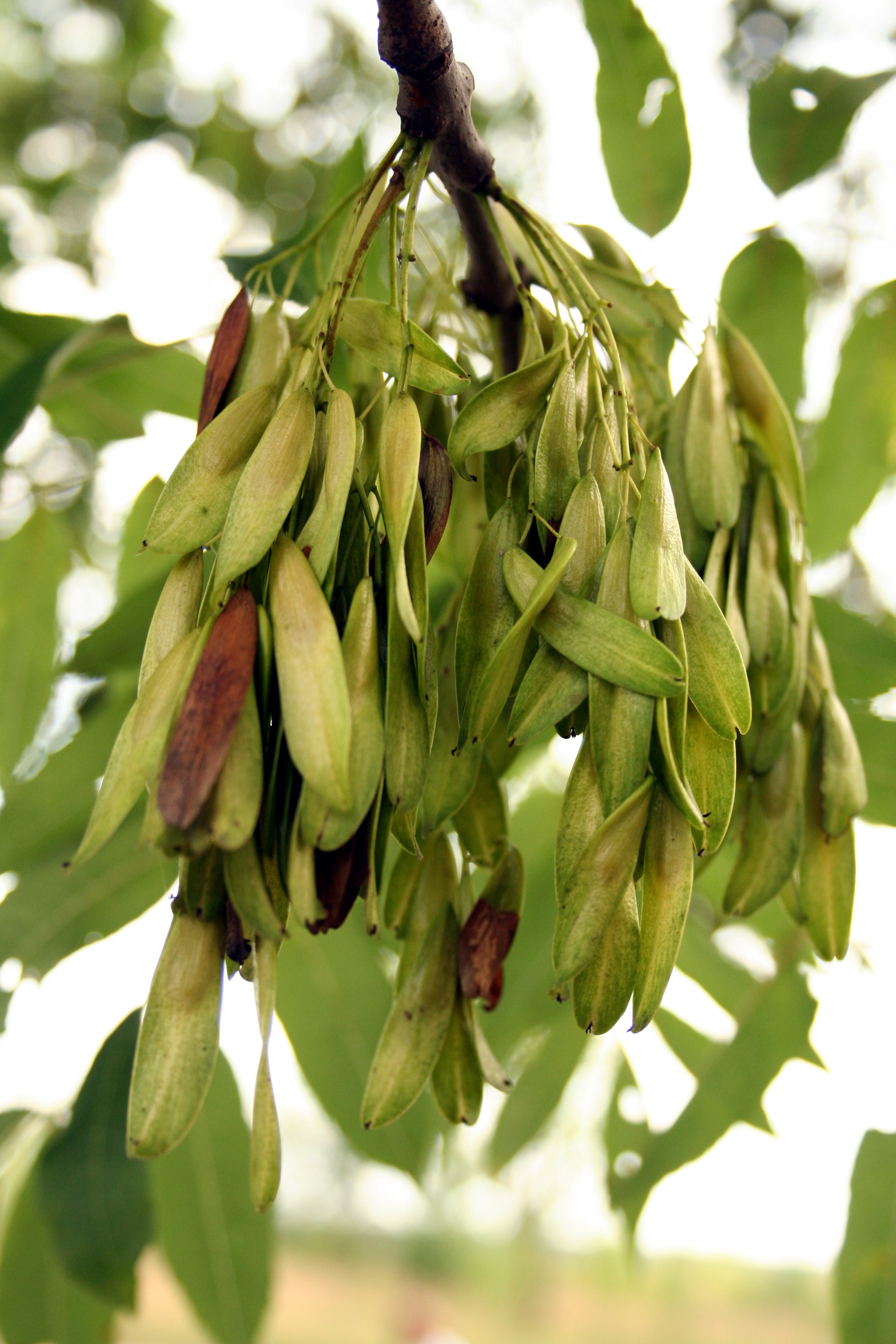
Seeds of Fraxinus excelsior, popularly known as "keys" or "helicopter seeds", are a type of fruit known as a samara.

It is a large deciduous tree growing to 12–18 m (39–59 ft) (exceptionally to 43 m or 141 ft) tall with a trunk up to 2 m (6.6 ft) (exceptionally to 3.5 m or 11 ft) diameter, with a tall, narrow crown. The bark is smooth and pale grey on young trees, becoming thick and vertically fissured on old trees. The shoots are stout, greenish-grey, with jet-black buds (which distinguish it from most other ash species, which have grey or brown buds). The leaves are opposite, 20–35 cm (7.9–13.8 in) long, pinnately compound, with 7–13 leaflets with coarsely serrated margins, elliptic to narrowly elliptic, 3–12 cm (1.2–4.7 in) long and 0.8–3 cm (0.31–1.18 in) broad and sessile on the leaf rachis. There are no stipules. These features distinguish ash from mountain ash (Sorbus aucuparia) in which the leaves are alternate with paired stipules. The leaves are often among the last to open in spring, and the first to fall in autumn if an early frost strikes; they often fall dull green or develop a bright yellow autumn colour. The flowers are borne in short panicles, open before the leaves, and have no perianth. The female flowers are somewhat longer than the male flowers, dark purple, without petals, and are wind-pollinated. Both male and female flowers can occur on the same tree, but it is more common to find all male and all female trees. Ash can sometimes exhibit sequential hermaphroditism; a tree that is all male one year can produce female flowers the next, and similarly a female tree can become male. The fruit is a samara 2.5–4.5 cm (0.98–1.77 in) long and 5–8 mm (0.20–0.31 in) broad, often hanging in bunches through the winter; they are often called 'ash keys'. If the fruit is gathered and planted when it is still green and not fully ripe, it will germinate straight away, however once the fruit is brown and fully ripe, it will not germinate until 18 months after sowing (i.e. not until two winters have passed).

European ash rarely exceeds 250 years of age. However, there are numerous specimens estimated between 200 and 250 years old and there are a few over 250. The largest is in Clapton Court, England, and is 9 m (29.5 ft) in girth. There are several examples over 4.5 metres (14.8 ft) in Derbyshire alone.

The genome of Fraxinus excelsior has been sequenced using the self-pollinated offspring of a tree from Worcestershire, held by the Earth Trust.

== Distribution ==
Fraxinus excelsior is native to Europe from northern Spain to Russia, and from southern Fennoscandia to northern Greece. It is also considered native in southwestern Asia from northern Turkey east to the Caucasus and Alborz mountains. The northernmost naturally occurring location is in the Trondheimsfjord region of Norway, though they are planted further north. The species is widely cultivated and reportedly naturalized in New Zealand and in scattered locales in the United States and Canada including Nova Scotia, New Brunswick, Quebec, Massachusetts, Connecticut, New York, New Jersey, Maryland, Ontario, Ohio, Kentucky and British Columbia.

It is native throughout Britain and Ireland, particularly on limestone, as in northern Scotland, where the most northerly native ashwood in Britain occurs on limestone at Rassal Ashwood. It is widely planted elsewhere.

== Ecology ==
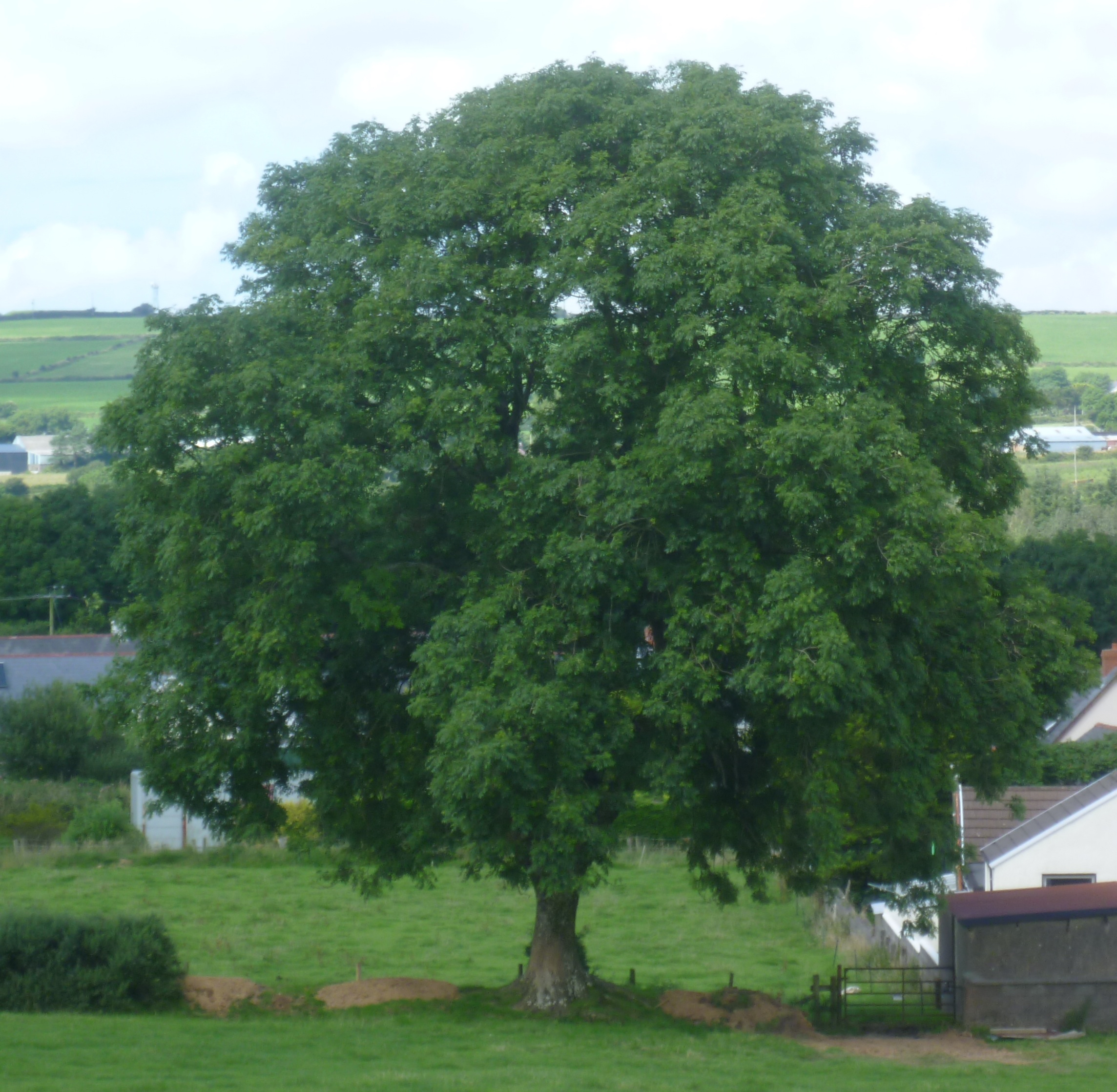
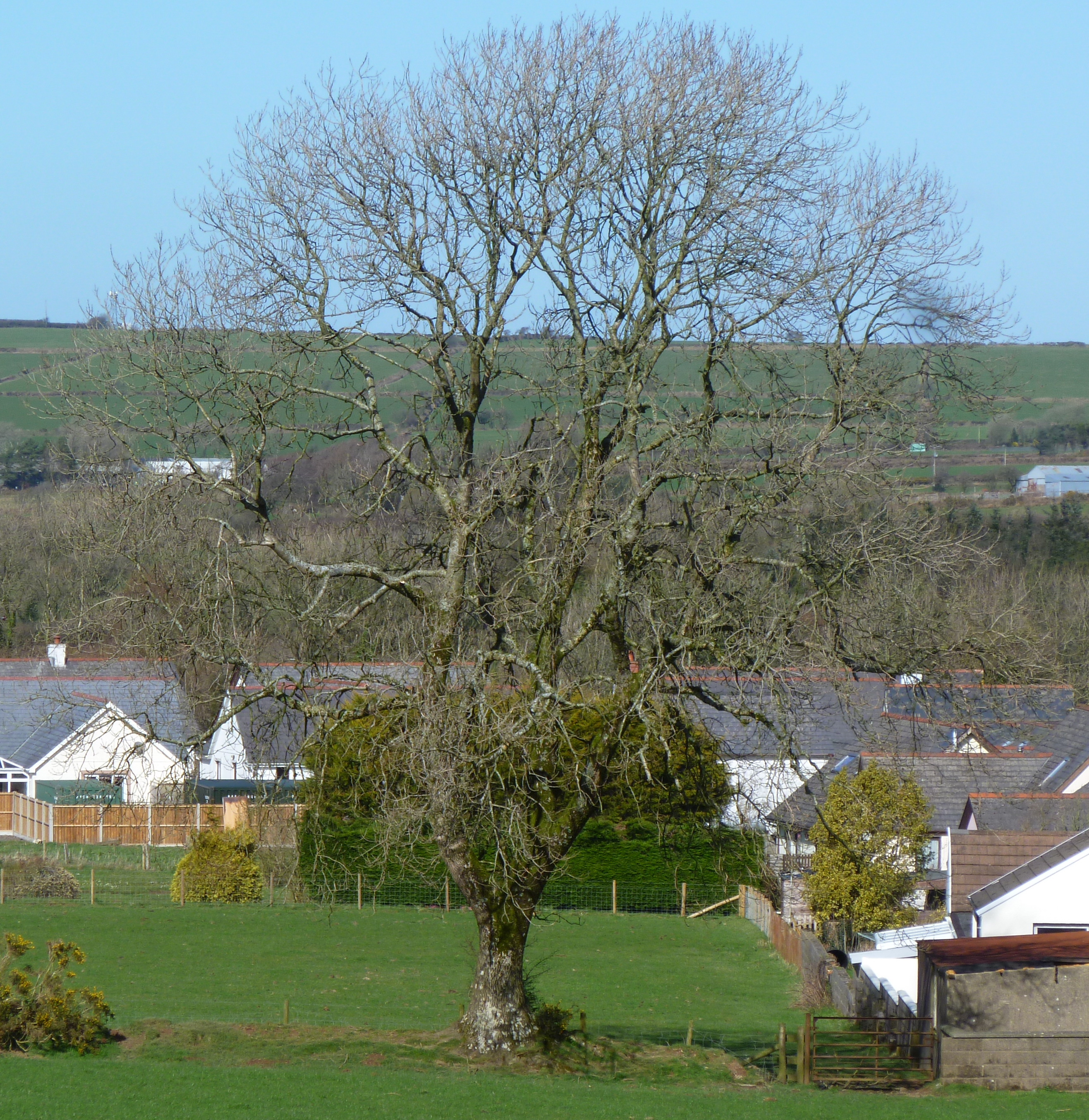
Ash tree (~20m tall) in Wales at 185 m asl in July (l) and March (r), showing branch structure

Ash occurs on a wide range of soil types, but is particularly associated with basic soils on calcareous substrates. The most northerly ashwood in Britain is on limestone at Rassal, Wester Ross, latitude 57.4278 N. Ash prefers moister soil types and is commonly limited by temperature and so not found at the higher colder altitudes in much of Europe, though in Iran, it may reach 2000 m asl. As a young seedling, it is shade tolerant, but older trees are light-demanding. It is an early-succession species and may well outcompete beech and oak, which are later-succession species.

F. excelsior mycorrhizae are of the internal arbuscular mycorrhizal type, in which the fungus grows within the tissues of the root and forms branched, tree-like structures within the cells of the root cortex. Unlike other Fraxinus species, F. excelsior does not form ectomycorrhizae.

The Biological Records Centre of the UK records 111 species of insects and mites using ash as a food plant, of which 29 are specific to ash. A further six are specific to ash and its Oleaceae relative wild privet (Ligustrum vulgare). A number of Lepidoptera species use the species as a food source. One example of an ash-specific feeding moth is the centre-barred sallow (Atethmia centrago). The larvae burrow into the buds when newly hatched and later feed on the flowers and leaves. A common moth which causes the browning of ash leaves, as well as garden privet and lilac, is Gracillaria syringella. The usually gregarious larvae form an epidermal gallery (i.e. feed within the leaf) which leads to a brown blotch with black frass. Later, two successive cones are formed by folding the tip of a leaf downwards.

In Britain, 14 galls have been recorded on ash. The British Plant Gall Society defines a gall as "... an abnormal growth produced by a plant under the influence of another organism".

=== Ash dieback ===
Ash dieback is caused by the fungus Hymenoscyphus fraxineus which was previously known as Chalara fraxinea. Research into the genetics of the resistance of ash (Fraxinus excelsior) has shown that resistance does occur in European populations, but at least for the samples tested, it is neither common nor strong. In some cases, it has been observed that the pathogen can trigger the full replacement of the species in native forests. Due to the importance of F. excelsior as a host, Jönsson and Thor 2012 find that rare/threatened lichens face an unusually high (0.38) coextinction risk probability vis-a-vis the host tree in the wooded meadows of Gotland, Sweden. The genomic basis of ash dieback resistance has been characterised by the sequencing of mass screening trials. It was demonstrated that natural selection was acting in a natural woodland in Surrey, England, to increase resistance to ash dieback in the younger generation of ash. The genomic basis of ash dieback resistance has also been investigated in continental Europe.

=== Emerald ash borer ===
The emerald ash borer Agrilus planipennis has recently begun to invade the range of Fraxinus excelsior. Some studies suggest that Fraxinus excelsior may be less susceptible to emerald ash borer than American species of ash are. However, the effect of the interaction of ash dieback and emerald ash borer is as yet unknown.

== Uses ==
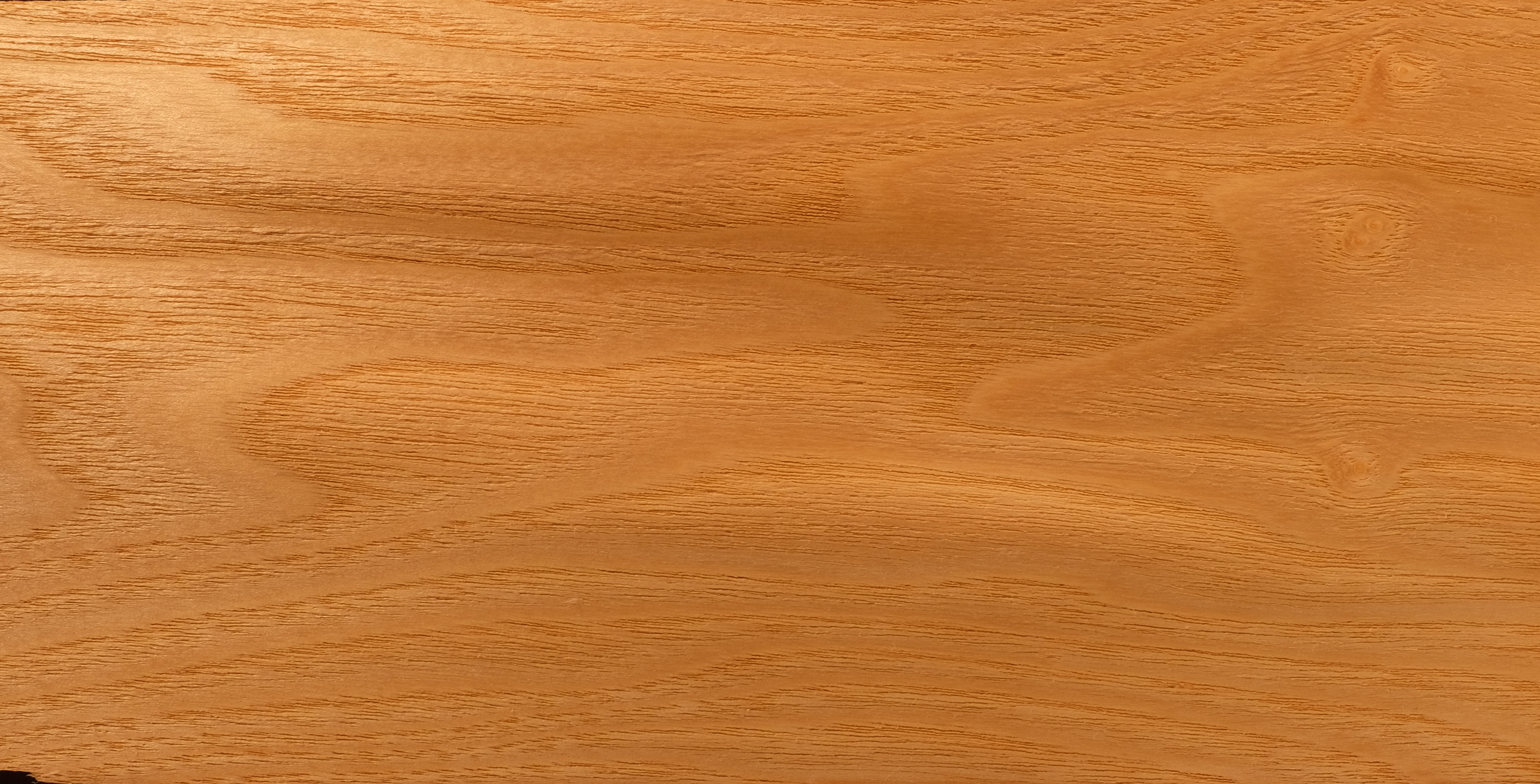
Veneer of common ash wood

The resilience and rapid growth made it an important resource for smallholders and farmers. It was probably the most versatile wood in the countryside with wide-ranging uses. Until World War II, the trees were often coppiced on a 10-year cycle to provide a sustainable source of timber for fuel and poles for building and woodworking. The colour of the wood ranges from creamy white to light brown, and the heart wood may be a darker olive-brown. Ash timber is hard, tough and very hard-wearing, with a coarse, open grain and a density of 710 kg/m^{3}. It lacks oak's natural resistance to decay, and is not as suitable for posts buried in the ground. Because of its high flexibility, shock resistance, and resistance to splitting, ash wood is the traditional material for bows, tool handles, especially for hammers and axes, tennis rackets, and snooker cues.

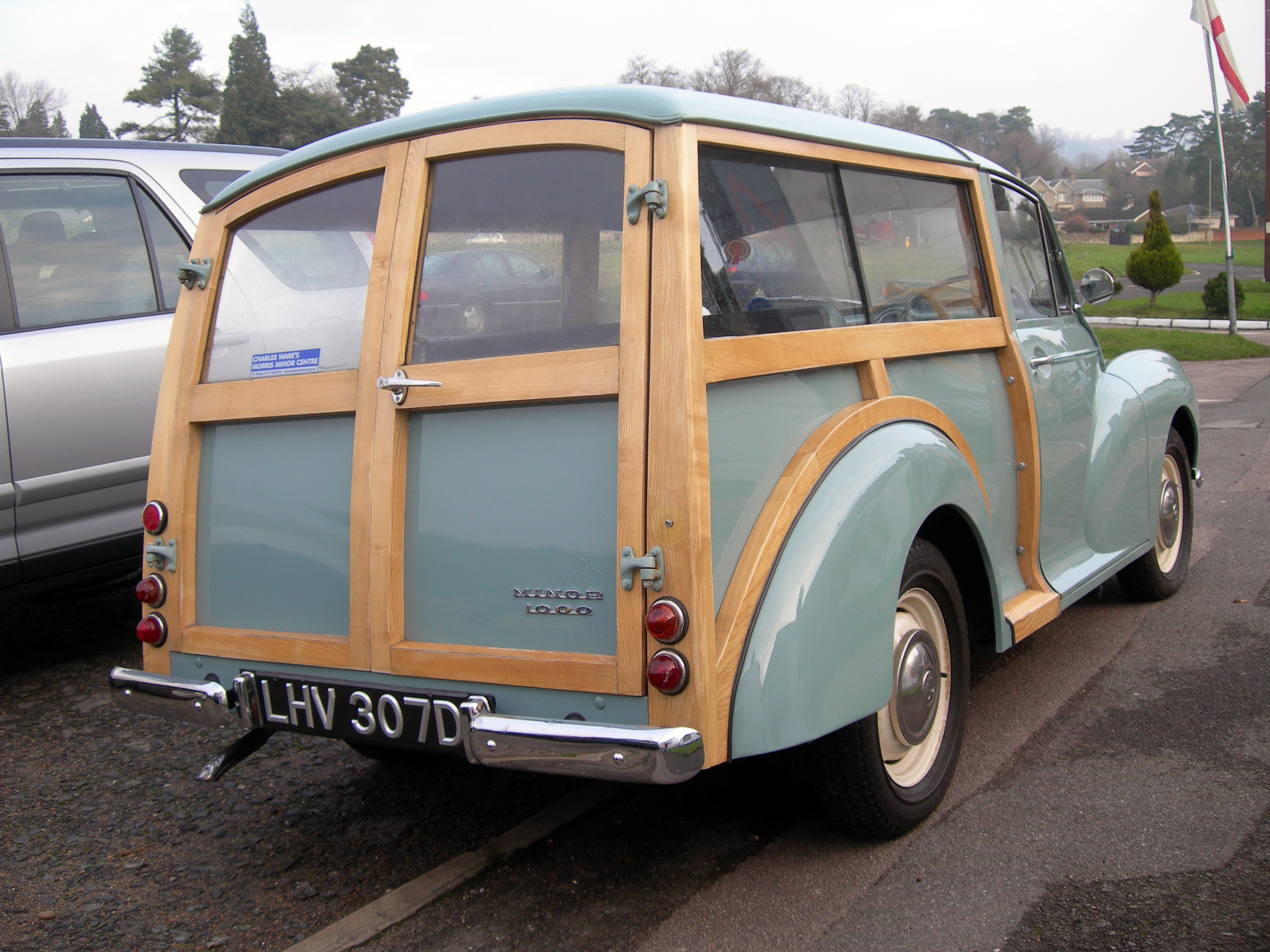
Morris Minor Traveller with ash frame, 1960

Ash was extensively used in the construction of early aircraft, and is, or has been used in the construction of some motor vehicles such as Morgan and Morris Traveller.

Ash was commonly used green for making chair frames which would be seated with another timber or with woven rush (e.g. those made by Philip Clissett, see also The English Regional Chair). The parts were turned on a pole lathe or shaped with a drawknife. The practice essentially died out in the early 20th century, but has seen a revival in recent years.

Ash is an important constituent of wood pasture, a European management system in which open woodland provided shelter and forage for grazing animals. Ash was coppiced and pollarded, often in hedgerows, and evidence in the form of some huge boles with multiple trunks emerging at head height can still be seen in parts of Britain. The Glen Lyon ash is a notable example of a pollarded ash which at about 400–500 years of age achieved a girth of 6 m (20 ft). In Northumberland, crab and lobster pots (traps) sometimes known as 'creeves' by local people are still made from ash sticks. Because of its elasticity European ash wood was commonly used for walking sticks. Poles were cut from a coppice and the ends heated in steam. The wood could then be bent in a curved vise to form the handle of the walking stick. The light colour and attractive grain of ash wood make it popular in modern furniture such as chairs, dining tables, doors, and other architectural features and wood flooring.

Ash is the only wood used for the manufacture of hurleys, referred to as hurls in parts of Leinster and known as a camán in Irish, the timber sticks used in the game of hurling in Ireland. Hurleys are manufactured from the butt log (bottom 1.5-m of the stem) and from trees ideally of a diameter at breast height around 25–30 cm (9.8–12 in). Only fast-grown, straight, and knot-free ash can be used for this purpose. Due to the lack of available ash in Ireland, over 75% of the timber needed to produce the 350,000 hurleys required for the game annually must be imported, mostly from Eastern European countries. The importance of ash timber to the game of hurling is reflected in the fact that the game is referred to all over Ireland as "The Clash of the Ash".

Ash is valuable as firewood because it burns well even when 'green' (freshly cut). Ash bark and leaves are used in modern herbal medicine for their astringent and laxative properties.

== Mythology ==
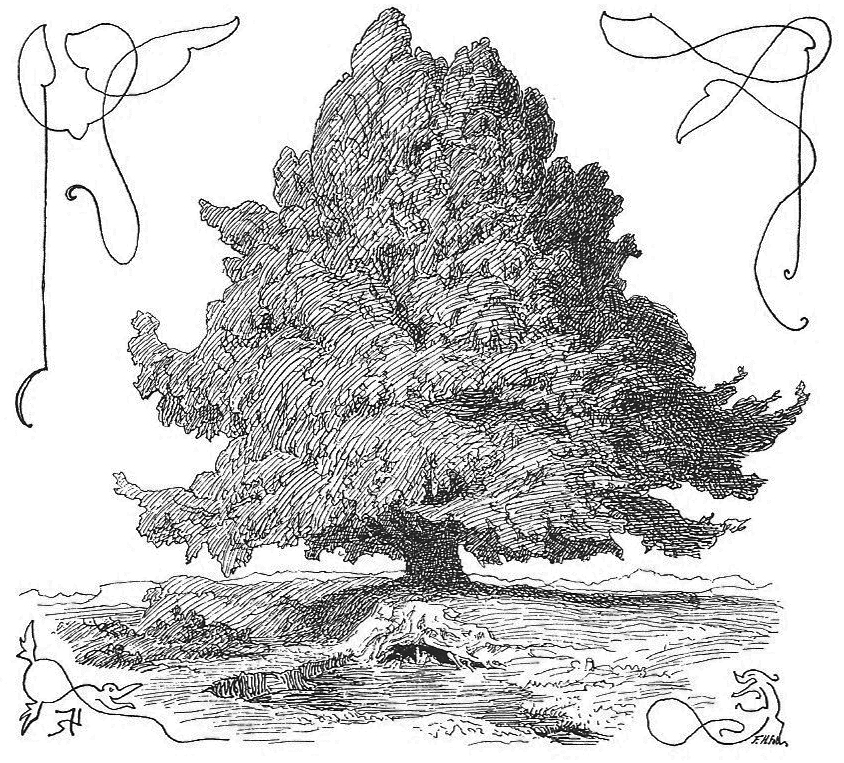
The world tree of Norse mythology, Yggdrasil—seen here depicted by Lorenz Frølich—is typically described as an ash tree.

In the 13th-century Edda and other writing relating to Norse mythology, the vast ash tree Yggdrasil ("the steed (gallows) of Odin"), watered by three magical springs, serves as axis mundi, sustaining the nine worlds of the cosmos in its roots and branches.

== Folklore ==
On the Isle of Bute in Scotland, lovers reportedly used to eat leaves of an ash tree known as the "Dreamin' Tree" that grew near the church of St Blane, and the pleasant dreams they then experienced revealed their actual spouses and intended fates.

== Cultivars ==
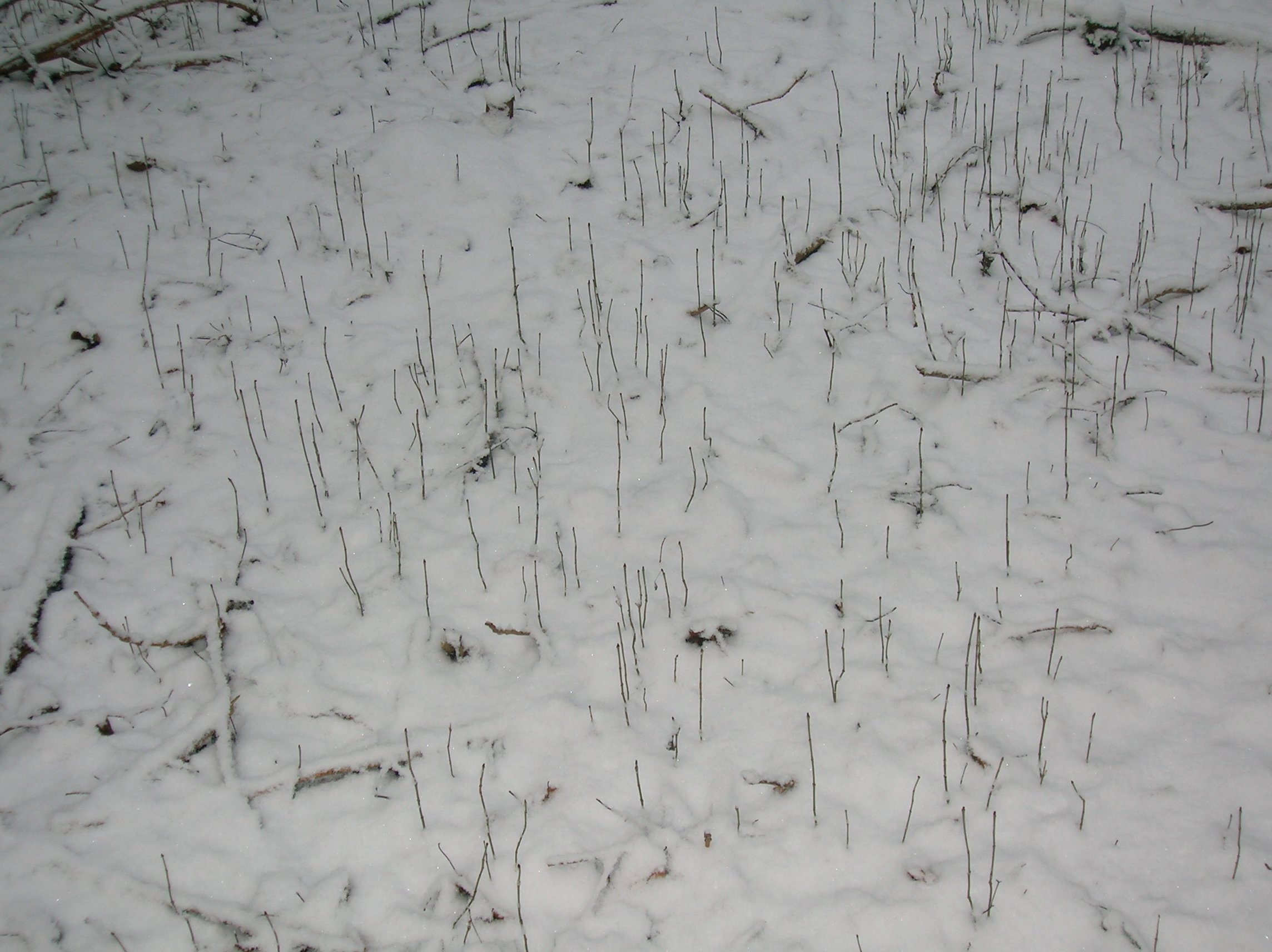
Ash saplings from a mast year

Its many cultivars include;

- Fraxinus excelsior 'Aurea', the traditional, slow-growing golden ash ─ not to be confused with 'Jaspidea'
- Fraxinus excelsior 'Aurea Pendula' (weeping golden ash)
- Fraxinus excelsior 'Autumn Blaze'
- Fraxinus excelsior 'Autumn Purple'
- Fraxinus excelsior 'Crispa'
- Fraxinus excelsior 'Diversifolia' (one-leaved ash)
- Fraxinus excelsior 'Erosa'
- Fraxinus excelsior 'Jaspidea' a modern, vigorous golden ash
- Fraxinus excelsior 'Monophylla'
- Fraxinus excelsior 'Nana'
- Fraxinus excelsior 'Pendula' (weeping ash), one of the best-known cultivars, widely planted during the Victorian era, grows vigorously forming an attractive small to medium-sized tree with mounds of weeping branches
- Fraxinus excelsior 'Skyline'

== Gallery ==
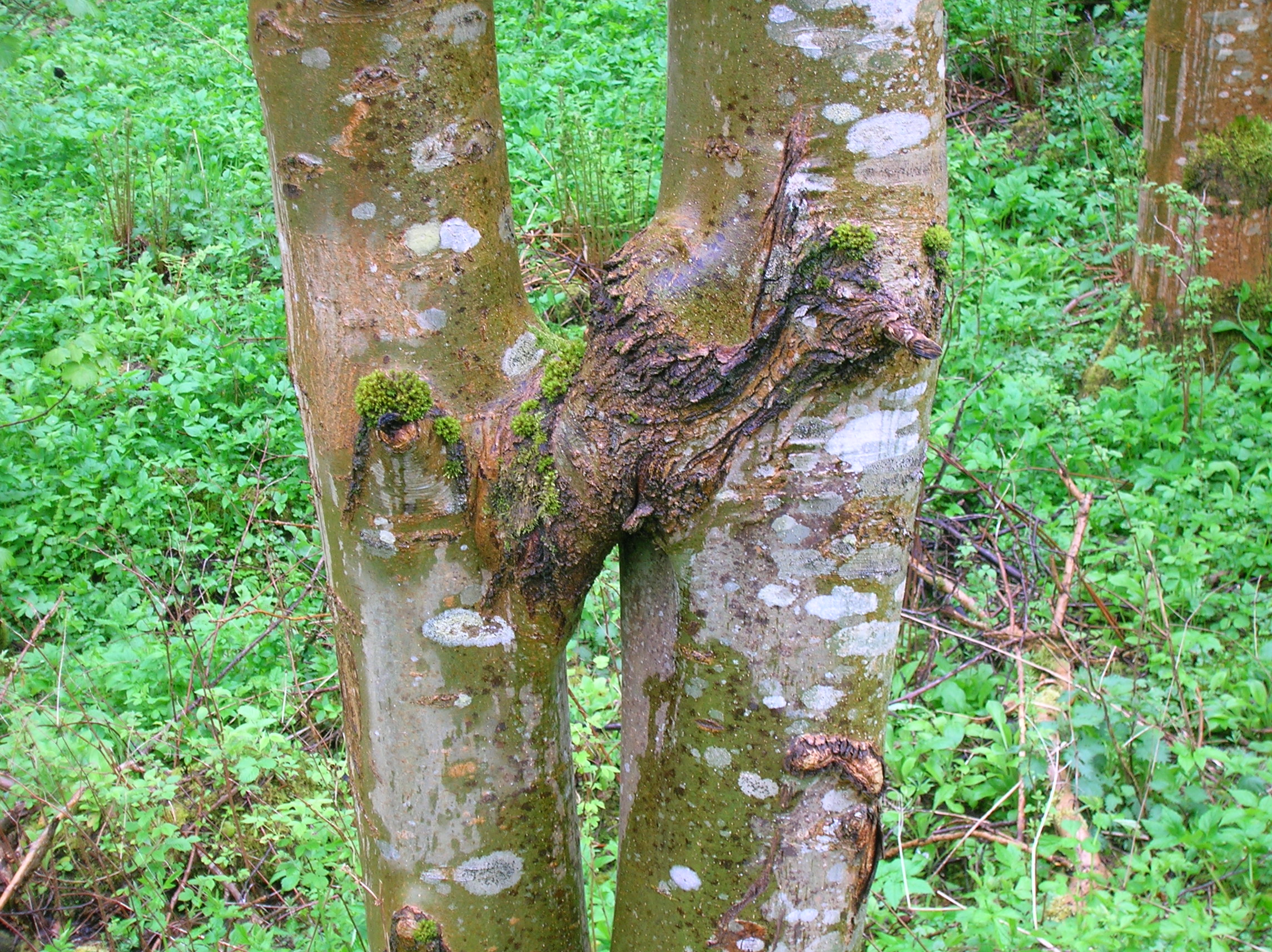
Two ash trees fused together

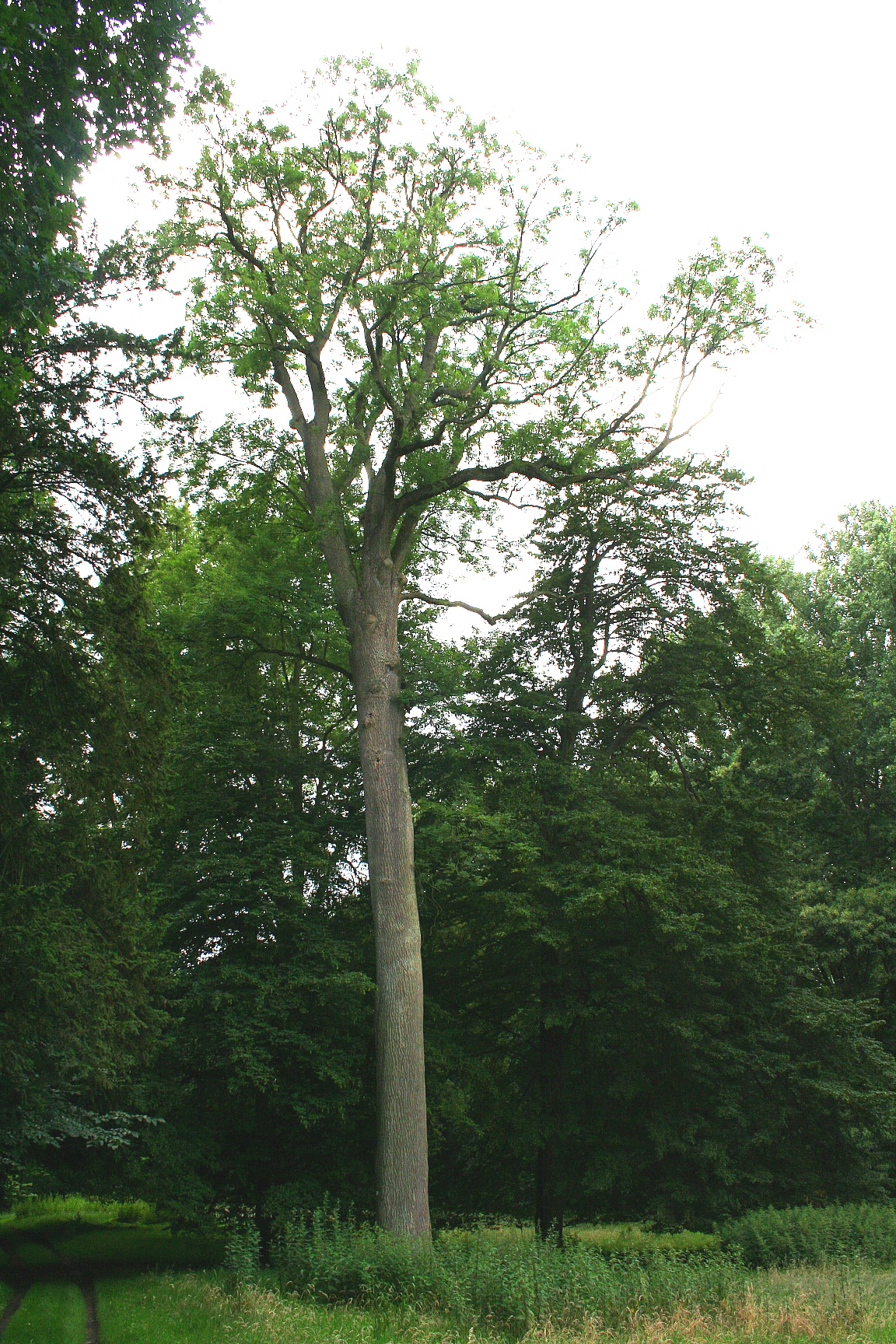
Tree 46 m tall, Château des princes de Croÿ, Le Roeulx, Belgium

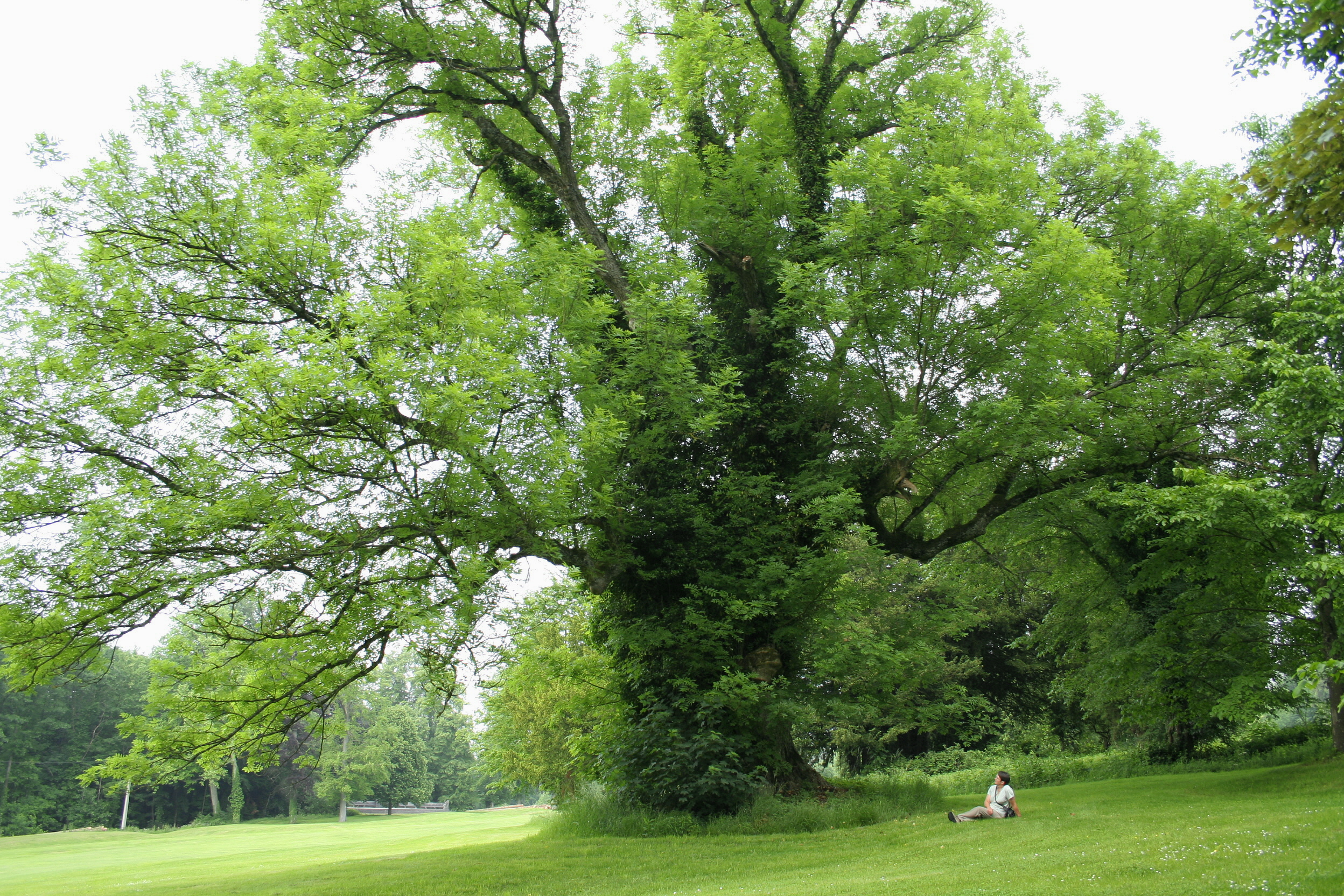
Old tree, Belgium

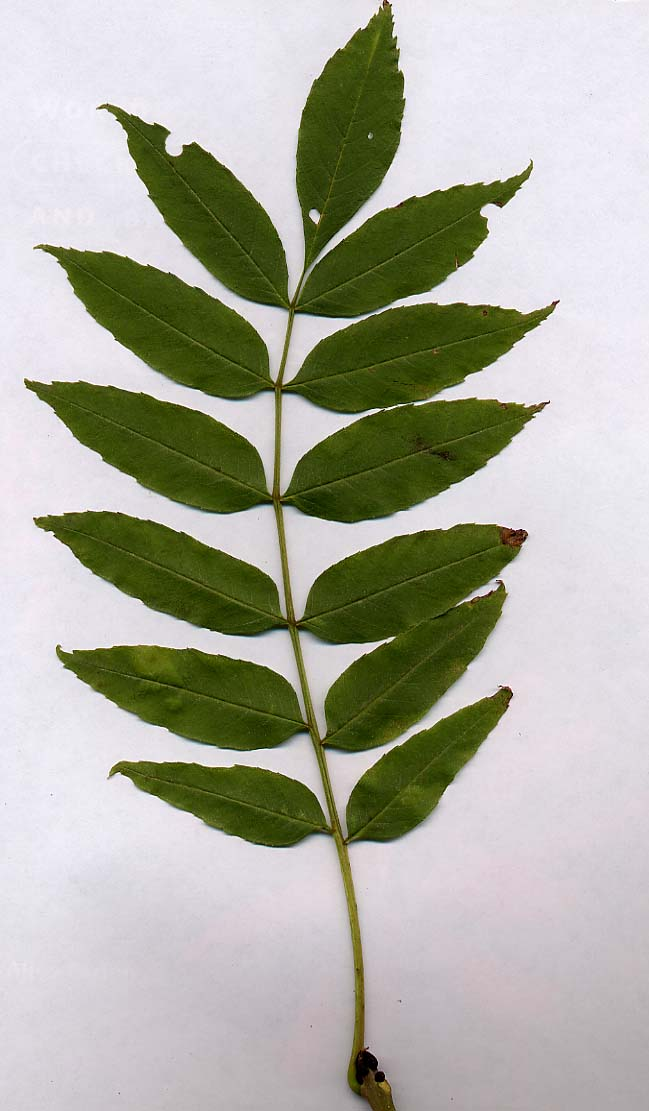
Leaf and shoot, showing black bud

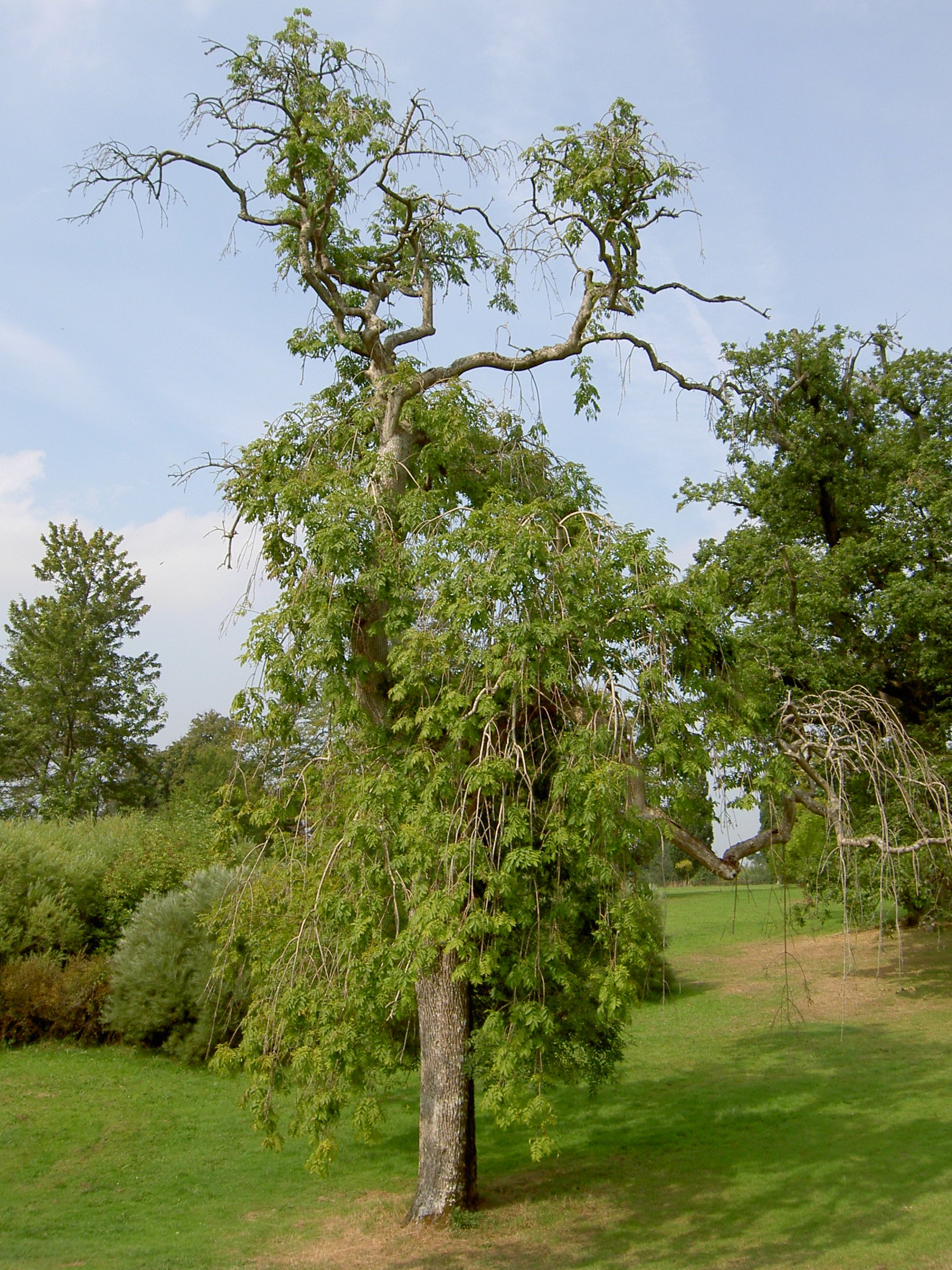
Weeping ash Fraxinus excelsior 'Pendula', Knightshayes Court, England

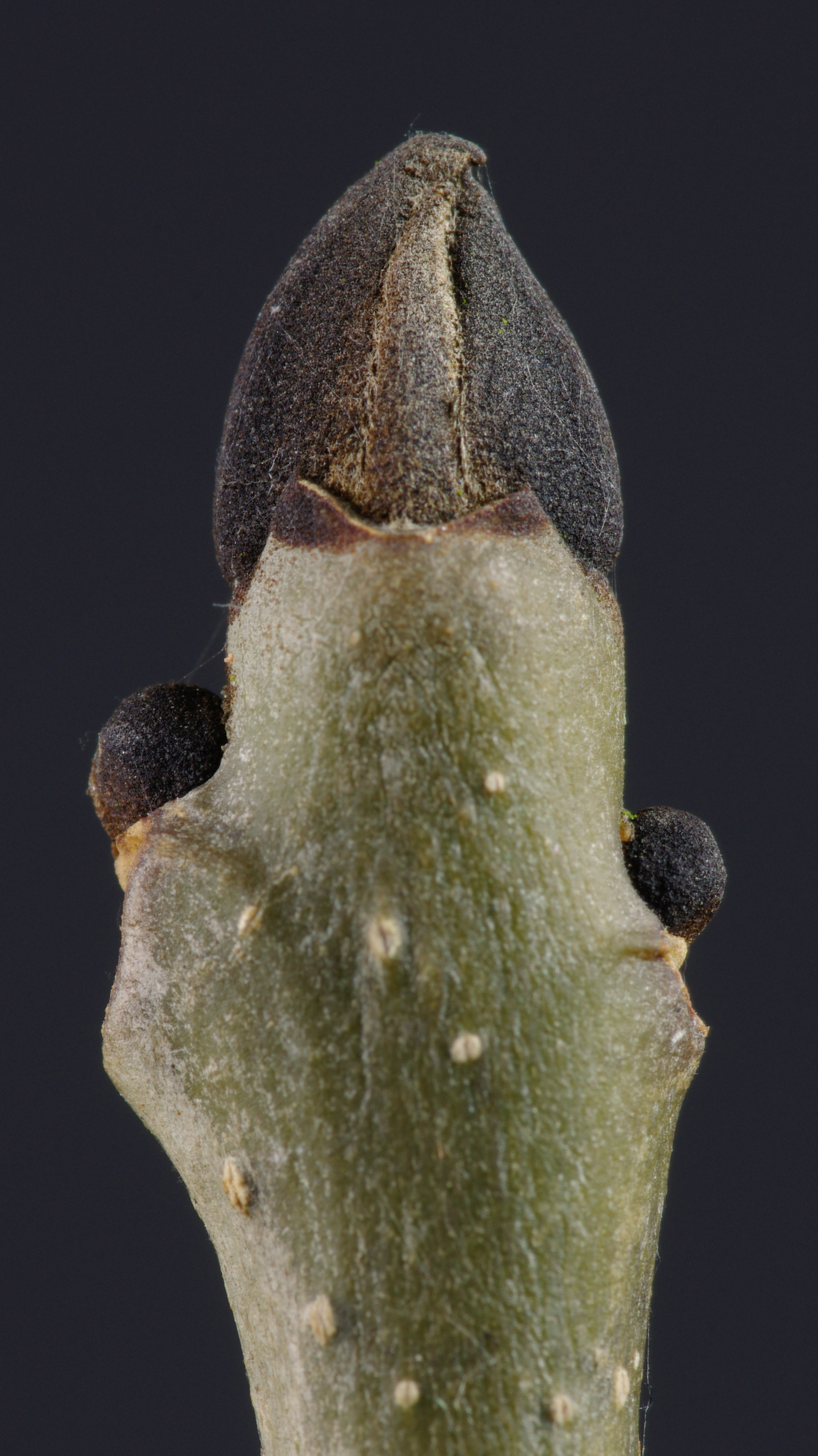
Buds

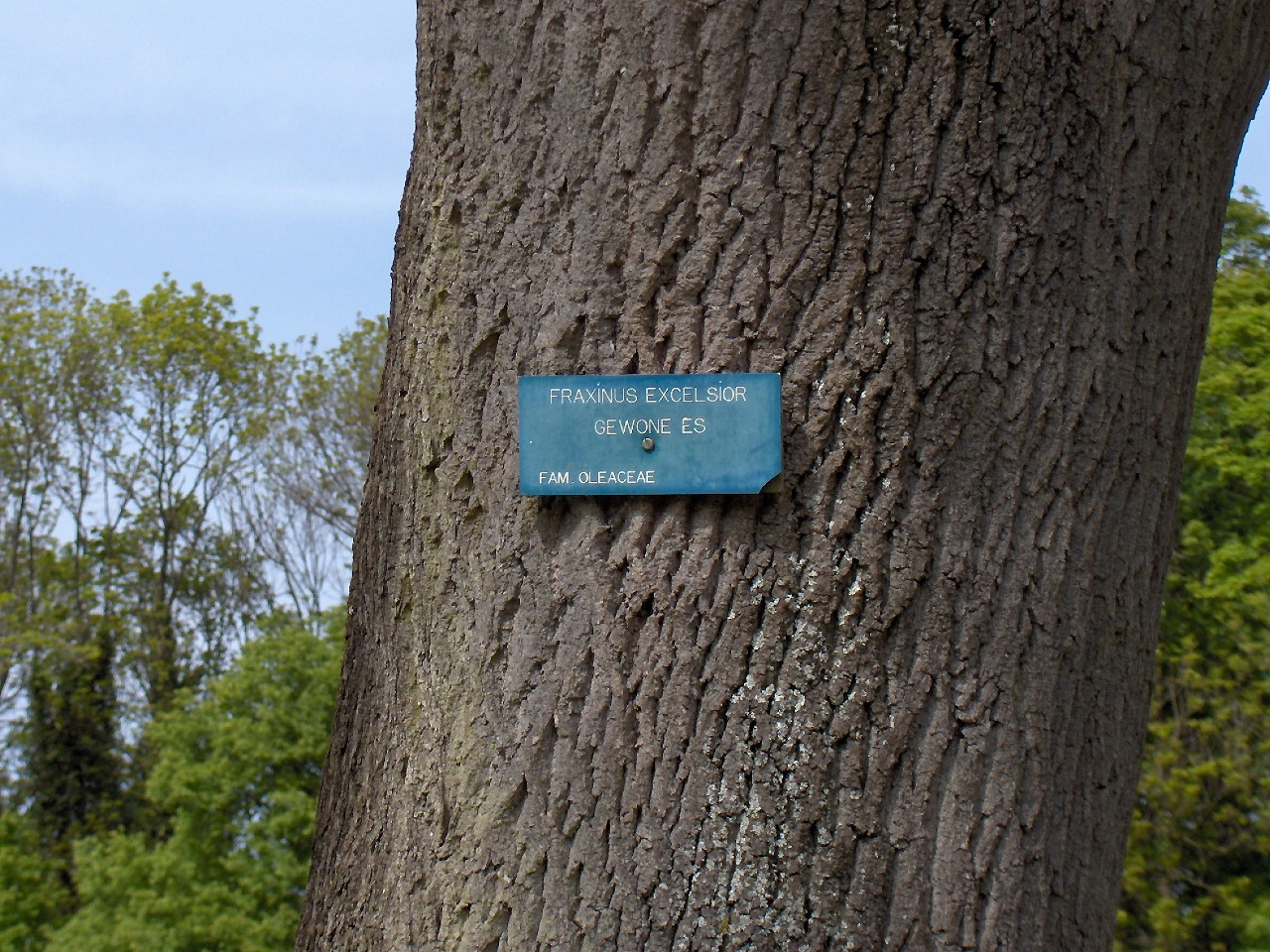
Bark

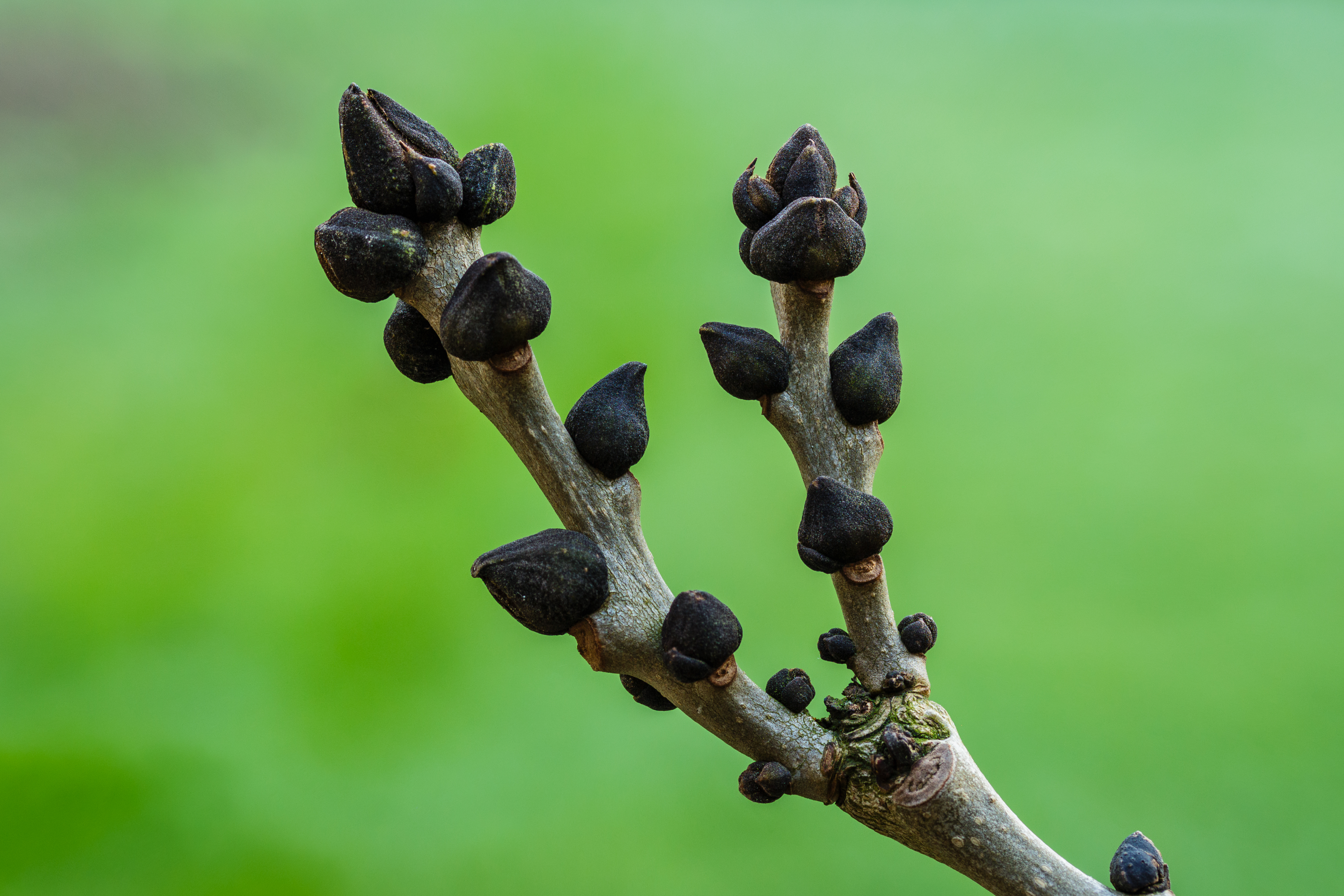
Buttons of a Fraxinus excelsior.
