= Bodging =

Traditional green woodturning craft

Bodging (full name chair-bodgering (Note: The OED Supplement s (1972) lists a bodger as a local name, in Buckinghamshire, for a chair leg turner. Hence (chair)-bodgering the action or process of chair-leg turning.)) is a traditional woodturning craft, using green (unseasoned) wood to make chair legs and other cylindrical parts of chairs. The work was done close to where a tree was felled. The itinerant craftsman who made the chair legs was known as a bodger or chair-bodger. According to Collins Dictionary, the use of the term bodger in reference to green woodworking appeared between 1799 and 1827 and, to a much lesser extent, from 1877 to 1886 and from 1939 to present.

== History ==
The term was once common around the furniture-making town of High Wycombe in Buckinghamshire, England. Traditionally, bodgers were highly skilled wood-turners, who worked in the beech woods of the Chiltern Hills. The term and trade also spread to Ireland and Scotland. Chairs were made and parts turned in all parts of the UK before the semi industrialised production of High Wycombe. As well recorded in Cotton the English Regional Chair.

Bodgers also sold their waste product as kindling, or as exceptionally durable woven-baskets.

Chair bodgers were one of three types of craftsmen associated with the making of the traditional country "Windsor Chairs" . Of the other craftsmen involved in the construction of a Windsor chair, one was the benchman who worked in a small town or village workshop and would produce the seats, backsplats and other sawn parts. The final craftsman involved was the framer. The framer would take the components produced by the bodger and the benchman and would assemble and finish the chair.

In the early years of the 20th century, there were about 30 chair bodgers scattered within the vicinity of the High Wycombe furniture trade. Although there was great camaraderie and kinship amongst this close community nevertheless a professional eye was kept upon what each other was doing. Most important to the bodger was which company did his competitors supply and at what price. Bodger Samuel Rockall's account book for 1908 shows he was receiving 19 shillings (£0.95) for a gross (144 units) of plain legs including stretchers. With three stretchers to a set of four legs this amounted to 242 turnings in total.

Another account states: "a bodger worked ten hours a day, six concurrent days a week, in all weathers, only earning thirty shillings a week" (360 pence=£1&10s.-) (Note: By comparison the national average earnings for 1908 was about £70 per annum ( ≈27 shillings a week).)

The rate of production was surprisingly high. According to Ronald Goodearl, who photographed two of the last professional bodgers, Alec and Owen Dean, in the late 1940s, recalled they had stated "each man would turn out 144 parts per day (one gross) including legs and stretchers- this would include cutting up the green wood, and turning it into blanks, then turning it".

Although the last of the original itinerant bodgers were relegated to the history books in the 1950s, the subsequent revival of interest in pole lathe turning since 1980 has seen many current chairmakers now calling themselves bodgers.

== Etymology ==
With this, we charged again: but, out, alas!
We bodged again; as I have seen a swan
With bootless labour swim against the tide
And spend her strength with over-matching waves.

Henry VI, part 3, Act 1, Scene 4 - Shakespeare

The origins of the term are obscure. There is no known etymology of the modern term bodger that refers to skilled woodworkers. It first appears c. 1910, and only applied to a few dozen turners around High Wycombe, Buckinghamshire. The Oxford English Dictionary Supplement of 1972 has two definitions for bodger, one is a local dialect word from Buckinghamshire, for chair leg turner. The other is Australian slang for bad workmanship. The etymology of the bodger and botcher (poor workmanship) are well recorded from Shakespeare onwards, and now the two terms are synonymous.

In Samuel Johnson's dictionary of the English language published in 1766, the Shakespearean use of the word "bodged", means to "boggle". According to Johnson "boggle" is another word for hesitate.

Other definitions of the word bodge taken from Robert Hunter's "The encyclopædic dictionary", suggest that it could also be a corruption of "botch", meaning "patch", or a measurement of capacity equivalent to half a peck - equal to 1 imperial gallon (4.5 L).

There is a hypothesis that bodges, defined as rough sacks of corn, closely resembled packages of finished goods the bodgers carried when they left the forest or workshop. Another hypothesis (dating from 1879) is that bodger (Note: In Sussex, England bodger is a dialect word for Badger. Parish, W. D. (2008). A Dictionary of the Susssex Dialect. Alfriston: The Snake River Press. p. 19.) was a corruption of badger, as similarly to the behaviour of a badger, the bodger dwelt in the woods and seldom emerged until evenings.

Other hypotheses about its origin include the German word Böttcher (cooper, a trade that uses similar tools), and similar Scandinavian words, such the Danish name Bødker. These words have similar origins to the English word butt, as in water butt. Or possibly it may have been a derogatory term used by workers in furniture factories, referring to the men who worked in the woods that produced the “incomplete” chair parts. The factory workers would then take the output of that "bodged job" and turn it into a finished product.

== Tools ==
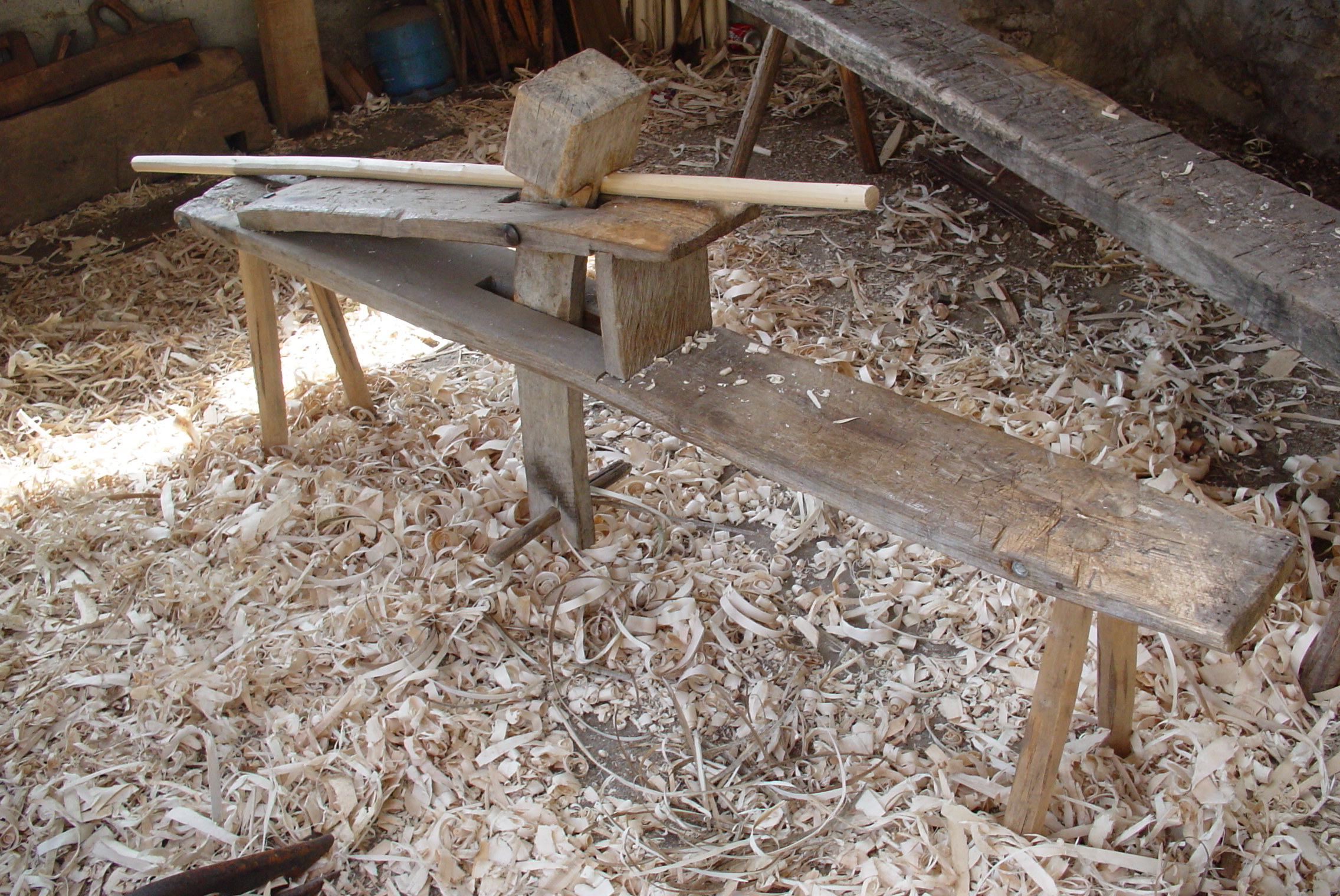
Shave horse

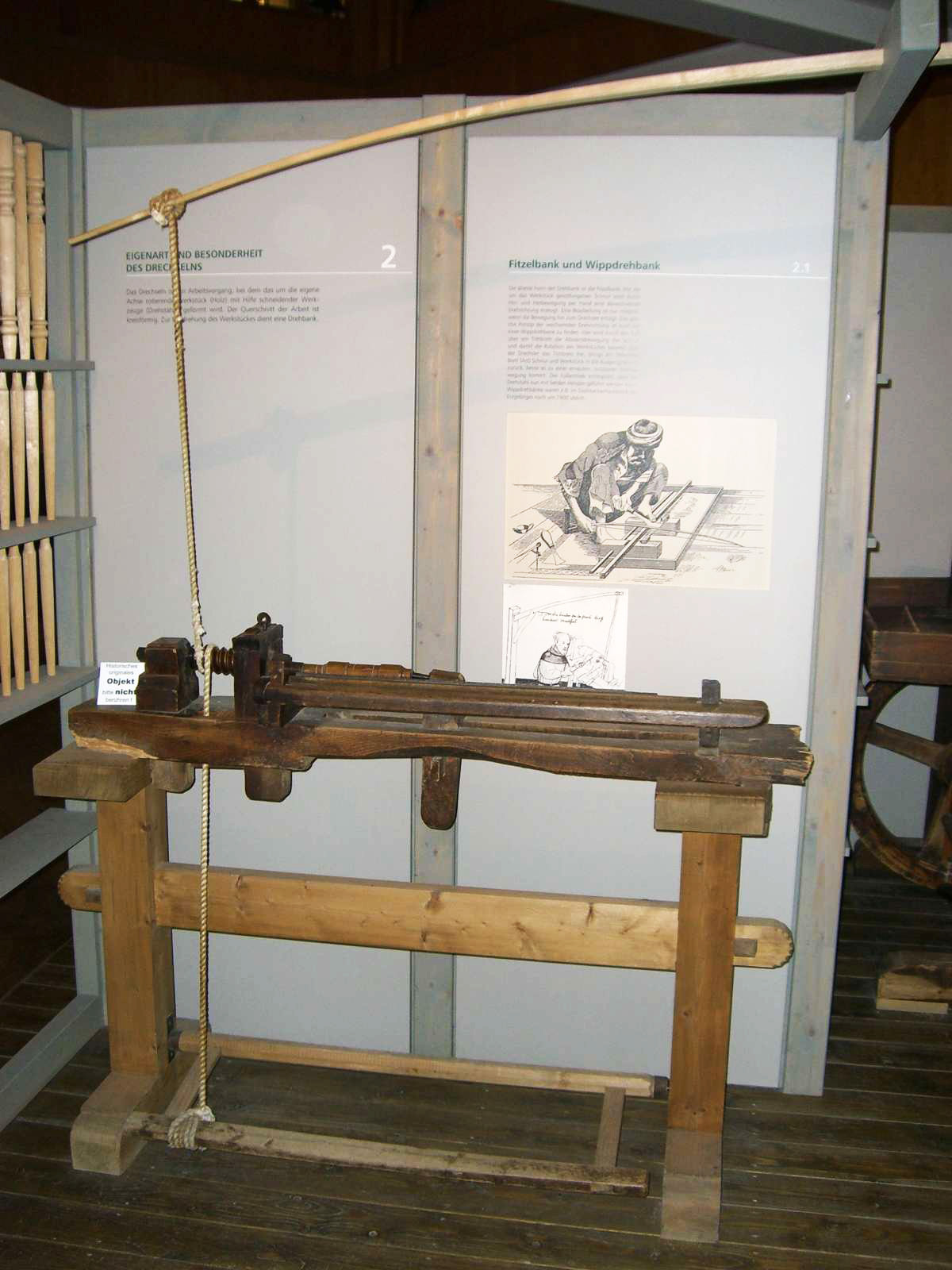
Polelathe in a museum in Seiffen, Germany.

The bodger's equipment was so easy to move and set up that it was easier to go to the timber and work it there than to transport it to a workshop. The completed chair legs were sold to furniture factories to be married with other chair parts made in the workshop.

Common bodger's or bodging tools included:

- the polelathe and a variety of gouges and chisels, and likely sharpening stones or grinding wheel for honing the rapidly blunted tools which are blunted far more rapidly than if used to shape seasoned wood stock.
- the spokeshave-like drawknife: for crudely rounding billets of green wood to be intermediately finished for the wood-turner. This is because "green" wood is far easier to slice near-finished to shape with the grain than to cut against the grain as per turning on the lathe.
- trestle or saw-horse (likely fabricated in the forest as required)
- a coarse saw: for cutting fallen or newly felled wood to length
- axes and adzes: for hewing wood into rough billets
- a shave horse to firmly hold the wooden billets for using the drawknife

== Accommodation ==
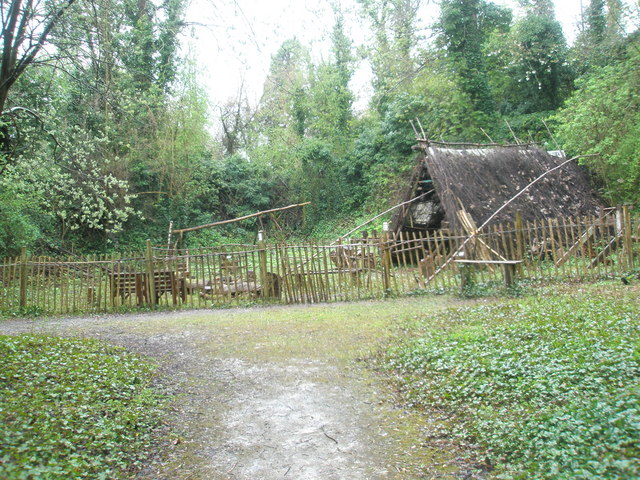
The Bodger's Hut at Amberley Museum & Heritage Centre

A bodger commonly camped in the open woods in a "bodger's hovel" or basic "lean-to"-type shelter constructed of forest-floor lengths suitable for use as poles lashed, likely with twine, together to form a simple triangular frame for a waterproof thatch roof. The "sides" of the shelter may have been enclosed in wicker or wattled manner to keep out driving rain, animals, etc. (Note: These "camps" were not where the bodgers lived, just where they worked during the day. They lived in cottages in the villages of the area and walked to work each day. They were no more "itinerant" than a modern day dry stone waller or thatcher.)

== High Wycombe lathe ==
High-Wycombe lathe became a commonly used generic term to describe any wooden-bed pole lathe, irrespective of user or location, and remained the bodger's preferred lathe until the 1960s when the trade died out, losing to the more cost-effective and rapid mechanised mass production factory methods.

== Working practices ==
Traditionally, a bodger would buy a stand of trees from a local estate, set up a place to live (his bodger's hovel) and work close to trees.

After felling a suitable tree, the bodger would cut the tree into billets, approximately the length of a chair leg. The billet would then be split using a wedge. Using the side-axe, he would roughly shape the pieces into chair legs. The drawknife would further refine the leg shape. The finishing stage was turning the leg with the pole lathe (the pole lathe was made on site). Once the leg or stretchers were finished, being of "green" wood, they required seasoning. Chair legs would be stored in piles until the quota (usually a gross of legs and the requisite stretchers) was complete. The bodger would then take their work to one of the large chair-making centres. The largest consumer of the day was the High Wycombe Windsor chair industry.

There were traditionally two other types of craftsmen involved in the construction of a Windsor chair. There was the benchman who worked in a workshop and would produce the seats, backsplats and other sawn parts. Then there was the framer who would take the components produced by the bodger and the benchman. The framer would assemble and finish the chair. After completion the chairs were sold on to dealers, mainly in the market town of Windsor, Berkshire, which is possibly how the name "Windsor Chair" originated.

== Notable bodgers ==
Samuel Rockall learnt the trade from his uncle, Jimmy Rockall. At the age of 61, Samuel was almost the last of the living chair bodgers. Rockall's bodging tradition was captured on film shortly before he died in 1962. His two sons helped in the reconstruction of his working life in the woods and his workshop. The colour film was produced by the furniture manufacturer Parker Knoll and follows the complete process using Sam's own tools and equipment. A film copy is available at the Wycombe Museum.

== Cultural references ==
In contemporary British English slang, bodging can also refer to a job done of necessity using whatever tools and materials come to hand and which, whilst not necessarily elegant, is nevertheless serviceable. Bodged should not be confused with a "botched" job: a poor, incompetent or shoddy example of work, deriving from the mediaeval word "botch" – a bruise or carbuncle, typically in the field of DIY, though often in fashion magazines to describe poorly executed cosmetic surgery. A "bodge", like its synonyms kludge and fudge, is serviceable: a "botched" job most certainly is not.

Douglas and Lucretia Bodger were brother-and-sister characters in the comic strip 'Flook', which appeared in the U.K. Daily Mail newspaper in the 1950s and 1960s.

Bodger is the name of a dog in The Incredible Journey.

Wycombe Wanderers Football Club's official mascot is a man called 'Bodger', referring to the club's record goalscorer Tony Horseman. He had earned the moniker from supporters through being employed in the town's furniture industry, but admitted in an interview after his playing career that he had never worked as an itinerant turner in the woods.

A character named Bodger is the protagonist in the British children's television programme Bodger & Badger and is himself involved in handiwork. In John Winton's comic naval novels, a major character is "The Artful Bodger".

== See also ==
- Chair
- Artisan
- Green wood
- Green woodworking
- Woodturning
- Woodworking
- BODGE (tag)

== Footnotes ==
Bodgers were also known to work in Mid Wales making chair legs, chairs and other common garden and household articles that could be made from "green locally felled wood"
