= Drawknife =

Woodworking hand tool

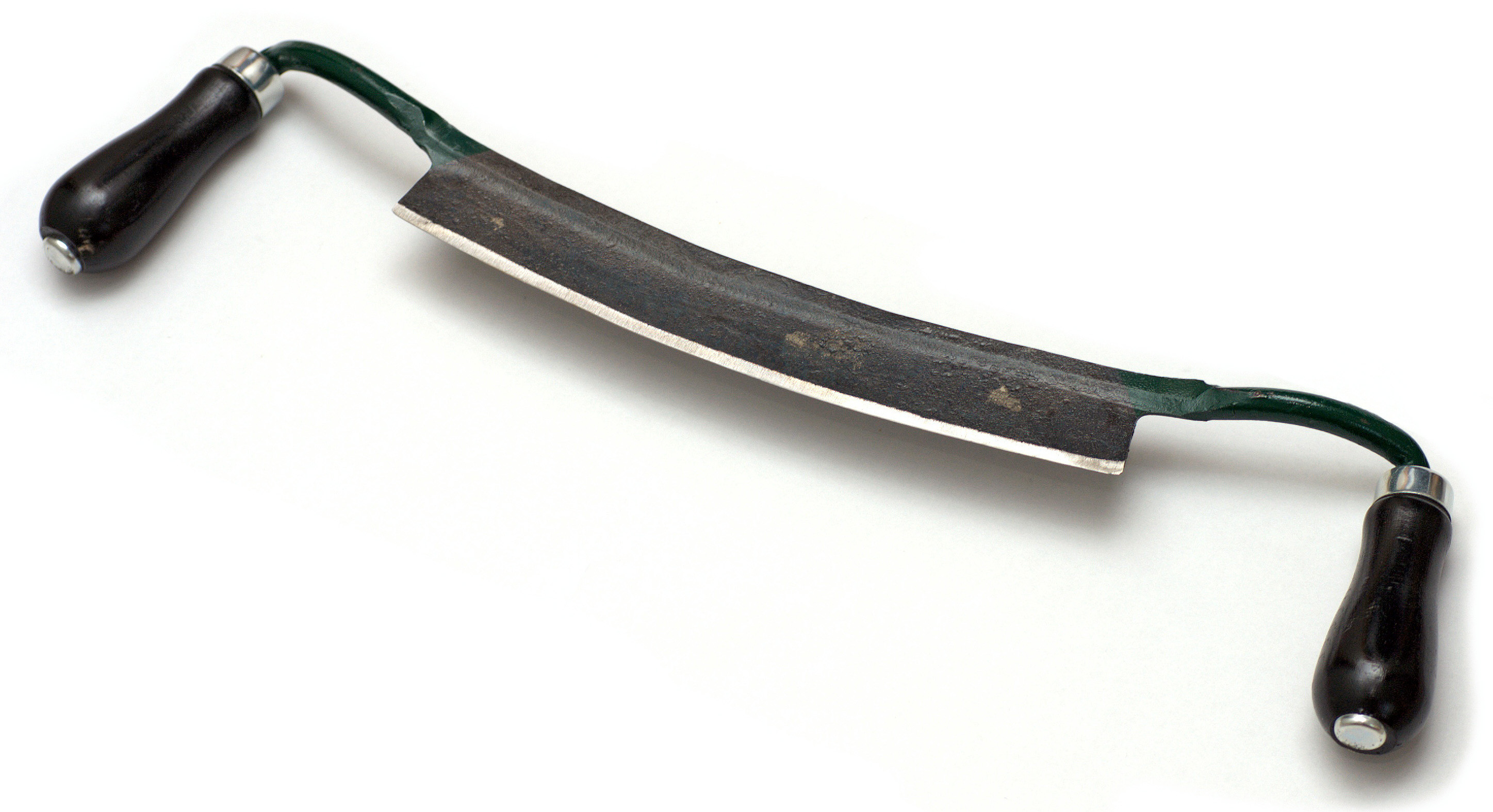
Traditional draw knife

A drawknife (drawing knife, draw shave, shaving knife) is a traditional woodworking hand tool used to shape wood by removing shavings. It consists of a blade with a handle at each end. The blade is much longer (along the cutting edge) than it is deep (from cutting edge to back edge). It is pulled or "drawn" (hence the name) toward the user.

The drawknife in the illustration has a 23 cm (9.1 in) long blade, although much shorter drawknives are also made. The blade is sharpened to a chisel bevel, usually about 25 degrees. Traditionally, it is a rounded, smooth bevel. The handles can be below the level of the blade (as in the illustration) or at the same level.

== Purpose ==
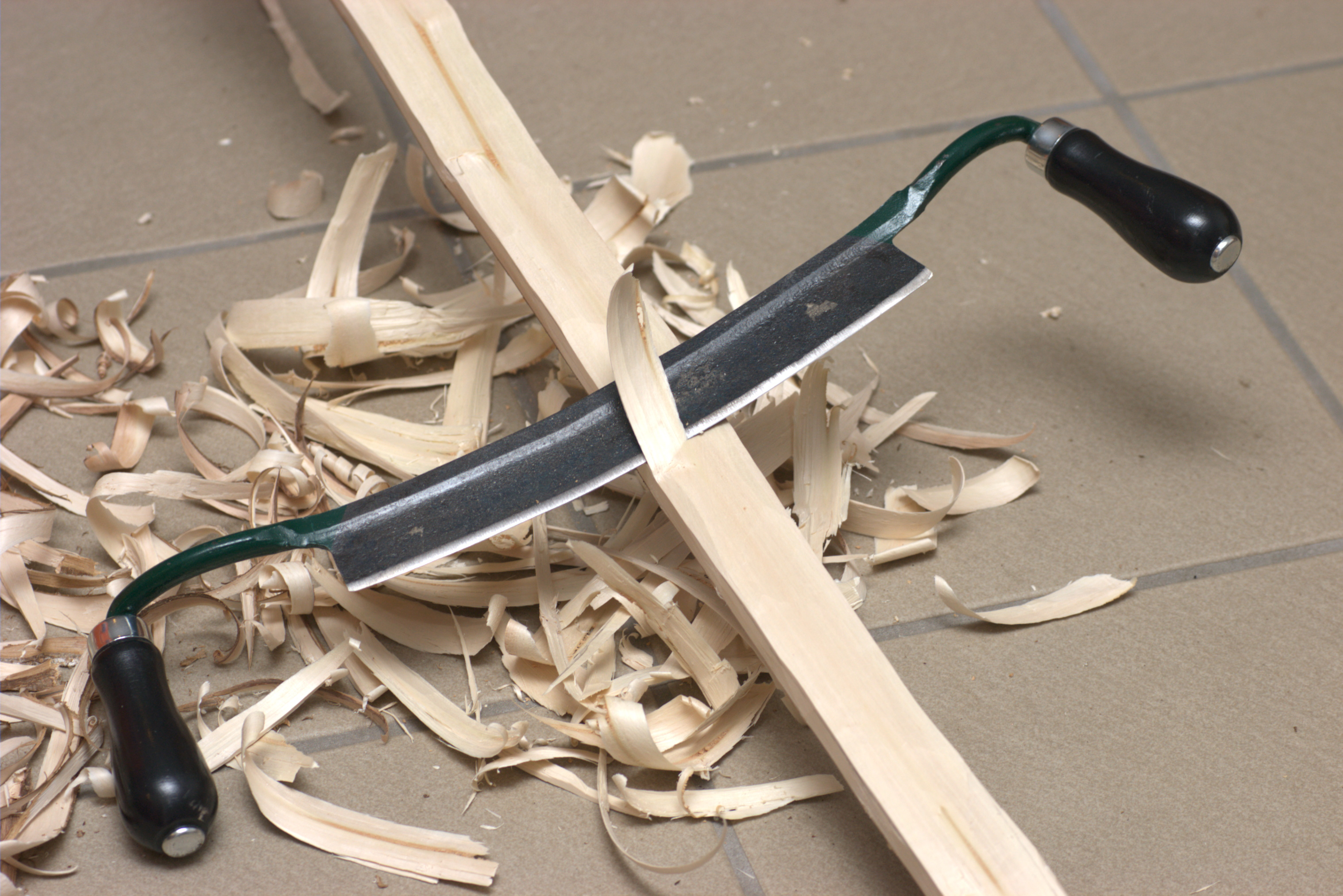
Using a drawknife in making a flatbow

A drawknife is commonly used to remove large slices of wood for flat faceted work, to debark trees, or to create roughly rounded or cylindrical billets for further work on a lathe, or it can shave like a spokeshave plane, where finer finishing is less of concern than a rapid result. The thin blade lends itself to create complex concave or convex curves.

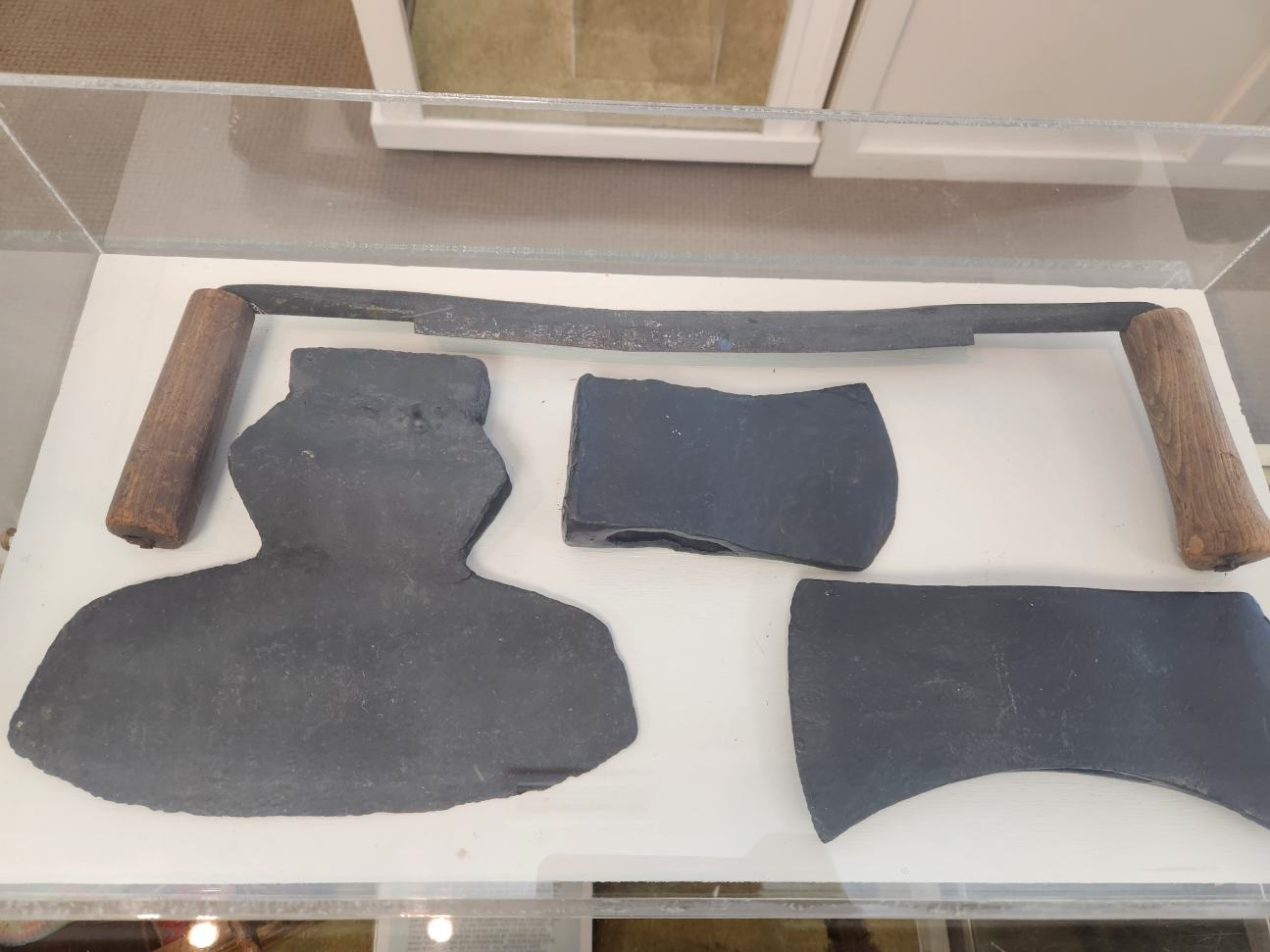
American drawknife circa 1800

Unlike a spokeshave, it does not have a closed mouth to control chip formation, and so lacks the spokeshave's superior cutting and shaving precision.

They are also a vital piece of equipment in hand-made cricket bats, being used to shape the curve of the bat.

=== Operation ===
The drawknife ideally is used when the operator is in a seated position astride a traditional shaving horse, which safely grips the working stock, and they can also use their legs for additional pulling power. The ideal working stock has the grain of the wood running parallel to the shaving horse, and perpendicular to the blade of the drawknife, so that the drawknife shaves away the entire wood fibre and does not cut against it. It is best not pulled with blade perfectly perpendicular to the wood stock, but pulled slightly upward toward them in a skewed (blade at a slight diagonal) or slithering fashion, aiming not to take off as much wood as possible, but gradually "shave" the work. The operator gently levers the blade to "bite" into the wood and then controls the depth of the cut by raising or lowering the handles as they pull the drawknife towards them.

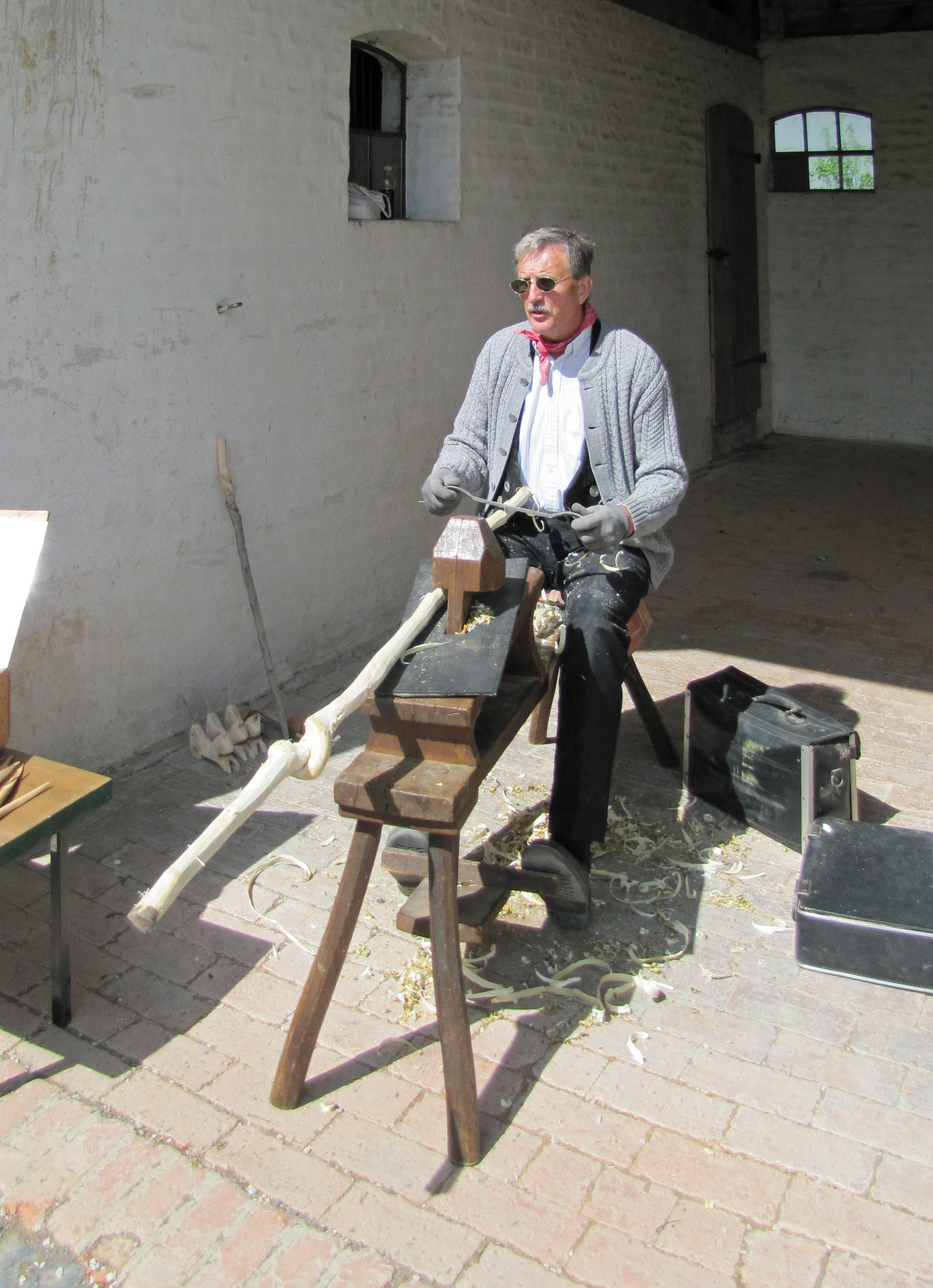
Draw shaves are often used with shaving horses.

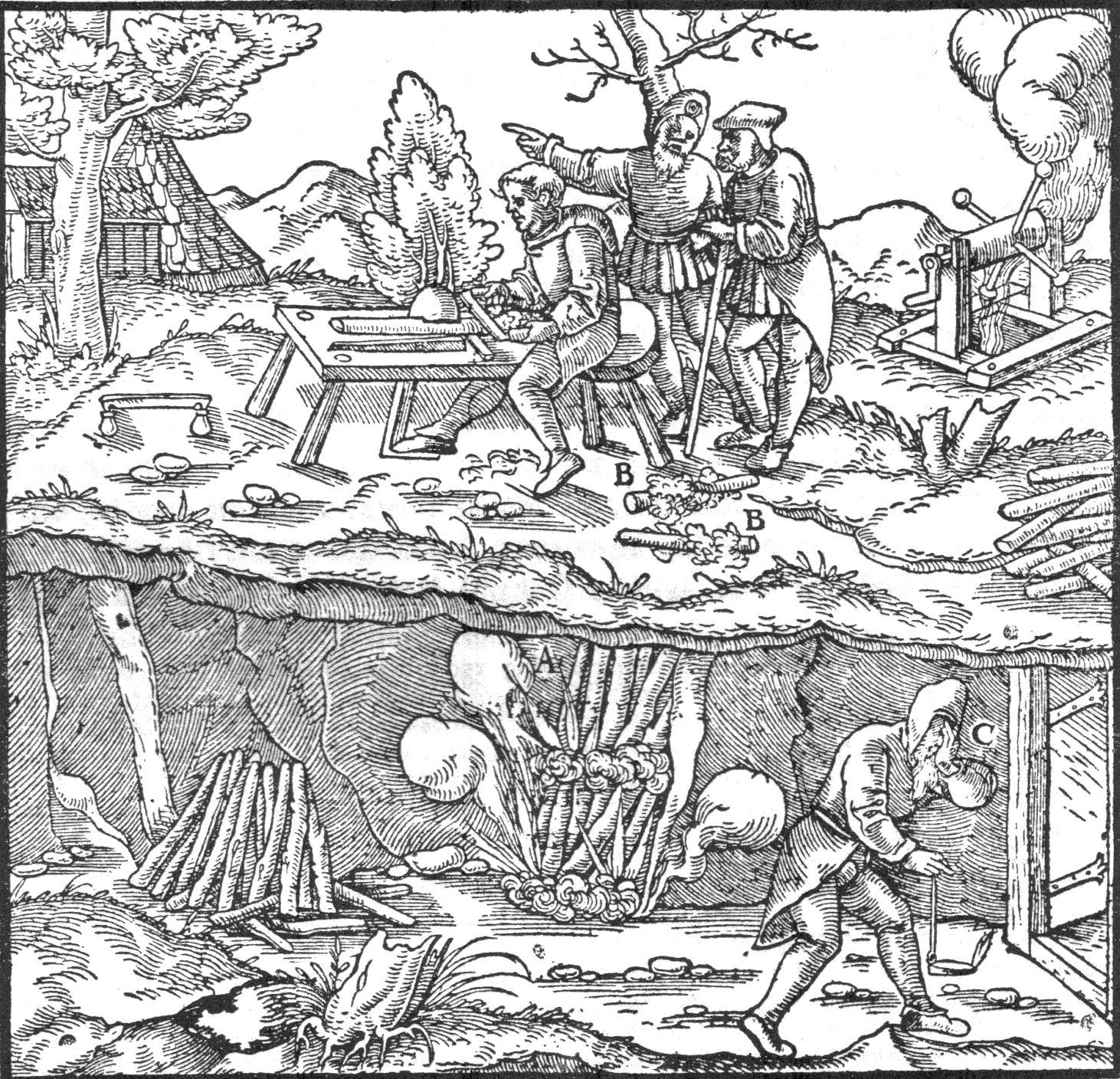
Use of a drawknife and shaving horse from De Re Metallica, a sixteenth-century work on mine technology

=== Straight cuts ===
One works from the centre of the piece to the end, not the entire length all at once. The operator then reverses the piece in the shaving horse or vise and works from near centre to trim the "fatter" end to match the centre and just finished original "skinny" end. Final work can be done by spokeshave, sanding block or lathe.

- When operated conventionally, that is, with the blade bevel-side upward, the drawknife takes deeper cuts and some novices may find it has a tendency to "dive" (cut unintentionally deep).
- When operated bevel-side down, there is the advantage of removing less stock, but the blade dulls more rapidly, requiring frequent honing.

=== Convex ===
The operator applies little leverage from centre and most leverage, so the blade "bites" deeper, thus removing more wood as they approach the end grain.

=== Concave ===
The operator applies minimal, then most, then least force on the handles from centre toward the end grain. The work stock is reversed and same method repeated this time commencing a tiny distance away from centre so as to leave a coarse raised section. The coarse raised section where the two concave curves meet can be finished with a rasp, file, spokeshave or other tool.

=== Splitting ===
For very rapid and rough removal of stock, the blade is drawn toward the user and rapidly levered into the wood to make as deep a cut as possible. The operator immediately stops pulling, and uses the drawknife blade to lever upward so as to "flick" the splinter or splice out of the worked piece. This technique is advanced and may damage the worked piece and drawknife blade if due care is not observed.

Traditionally, the waste shavings, which are particularly durable, are used for basket weaving or for kindling. They also make excellent compost and plant bed material.

Large drawknives can be used to dress logs, and small sizes for carving and shaving. A common use of a drawknife is to create a roughly cylindrical billet of wood for turning on a pole lathe.

=== Similar tools ===
A pushknife or wood splitting knife is a similar tool, used by pushing, rather than pulling.

An inshave is a similar tool with a blade curved out to the side between the two handles. It is used to shave wood to form a hollowed out surface, such as the top of a chair seat. It is also called a scorp. There are also versions with a single handle.

== See also ==
- Spokeshave
