= Green woodworking =

Carpentry on unseasoned timber

Green woodworking (also written greenwoodworking) is a form of woodworking that uses unseasoned or "green" timber. The term "unseasoned" refers to wood that has been freshly felled or preserved by storing it in a water-filled trough or pond to maintain its naturally high moisture content. This wood is much softer than seasoned timber and is therefore much easier to shape with hand tools. As moisture leaves the unseasoned wood, shrinkage occurs. This can be used as an advantage, as this shrinkage can help ensure tight joints. To enhance the effect of the shrinkage, a half of a joint may be forcibly over-dried in a simple kiln while its encapsulating component is left green. The components tighten against each other as the parts exchange moisture and approach equilibrium with the surrounding environment. The swelling of the dry tenon inside the shrinking “green” mortise makes for an incredibly tight and permanent joint despite a lack of adhesives. Bodging is a traditional green woodworking occupation, where chair components were made in the woods and exported to workshops where the complete chairs were assembled by furniture makers (or cabinetmakers, as they are referred to in the UK). Green woodworking has seen a recent revival due to increased media coverage and the renaissance of hand tool woodworking in general.

== See also ==
- Bodging
- Bentwood
- Engineered wood
- Green building and wood
- Jennie Alexander
- Timber recycling
