= Pole lathe =

Non-motorized woodworking tool

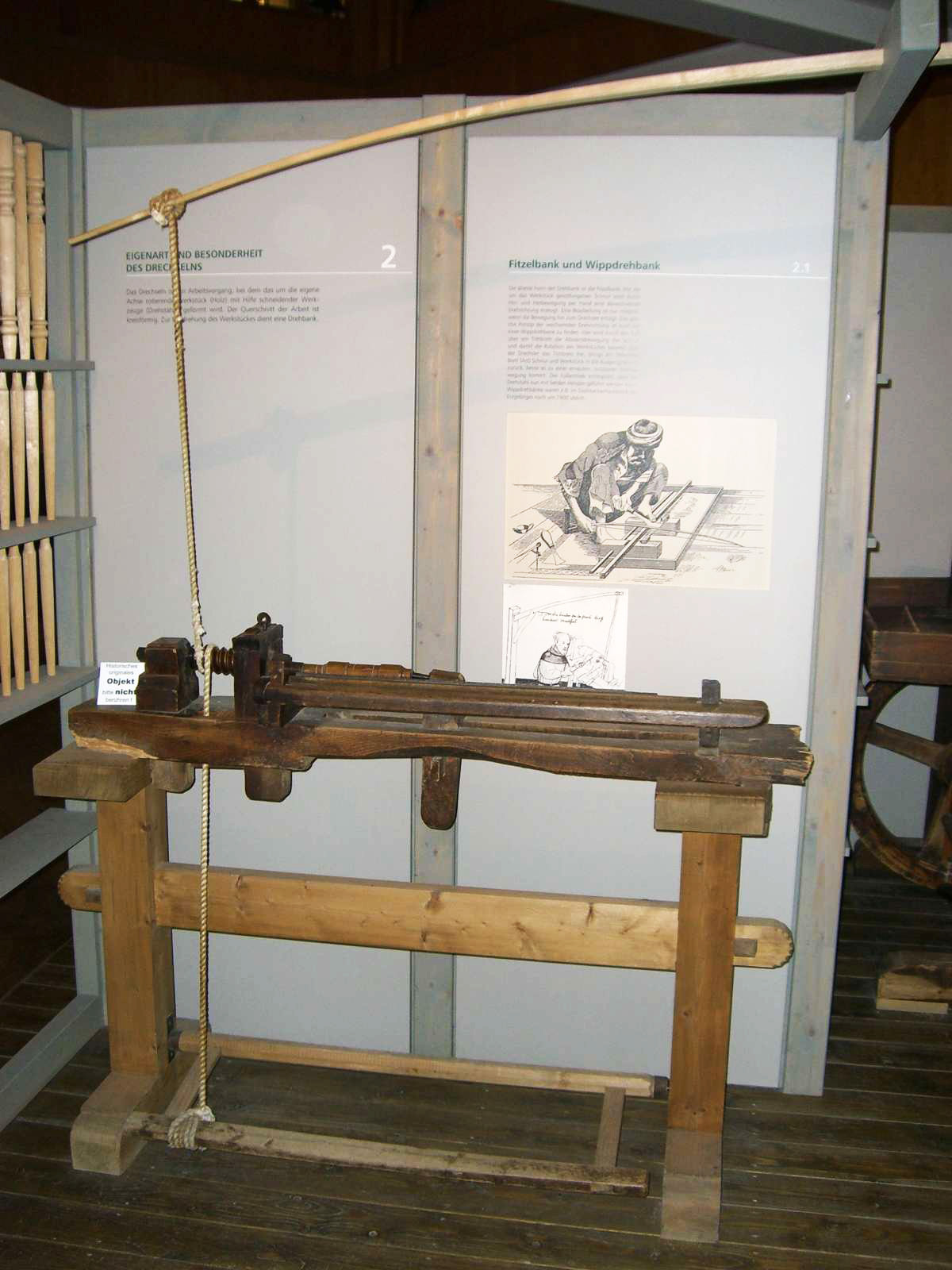
A pole lathe in a museum in Seiffen, Germany

A pole lathe, also known as a springpole lathe, is a wood-turning lathe that uses the resilience of a long pole as a return spring for a treadle. Pressing the treadle pulls on a cord that is wrapped around the piece of wood or billet being turned. The other end of the cord reaches up to the end of a long springy pole. As the action is reciprocating, the work rotates in one direction and then back the other way. Cutting is only carried out on the down stroke of the treadle, the spring of the pole only being sufficient to return the treadle to the raised position ready for the next down stroke. Bungee cords are sometimes used as a modern replacement for springpoles. A bungee cord can function within a smaller space but the pole lathe still rotates in two directions and cutting is only possible on the downstroke.

While the action of the pole lathe and the skills required are similar to those employed on a modern power lathe, the timber used on a pole lathe is usually freshly felled and unseasoned, i.e., green. Dry wood can be turned but the work will be slow and rough on the cutting edge of the tools.

The angle that the tools are ground is closer to that of a carpenter's chisel than that of a power lathe tool. Using power lathe tools on a pole lathe is safe, but hard work. Using a pole lathe chisel on a power lathe risks serious injury, since the forces are such that the blade is likely to break. The cutting edge on pole lathe tools needs to be quite sharp, being honed and stropped beyond the grinding, tools for power turning should not be improved beyond the ground edge derived by not finer than 120 grit. The higher speed and friction will degrade the cutting edge very quickly. In this aspect, pole lathe tools do not perform satisfactorily for very long on power lathes and power lathe tools give a poor finish on a pole lathe that will need to be improved by scraping or even sanding after the work piece has dried adequately.

The pole lathe's origin is lost in antiquity; it is known that Vikings used them from the archaeological finds at Jórvík, the Viking settlement discovered beneath the modern city of York in England. While the use of pole lathes died out in England after World War II, it has seen a return through the increased interest in green woodwork, although the majority of practitioners are at the hobby rather than professional level. Around Britain there are regular courses for learning the art of pole lathe turning and associated skills, culminating in making chairs or simpler items. The use of the spring pole lathe as well as other reciprocating lathes has found a minor following in Europe and the United States following the example found with the Association of Pole-lathe Turners & Green Woodworkers based in England.

As the wood is turned green or unseasoned it will shrink slightly as it dries. This is in slightly different proportions in line with the growth rings and across them and this differential shrinkage means the work piece becomes very slightly elliptical. This does not happen if the wood is pre-seasoned so you can differentiate between them. It is not often obvious to the eye but can usually be felt by running a hand around the piece.

== See also ==
- Bodging
- Philip Clissett
