= Billet (wood) =

Standardised form of wood fuel

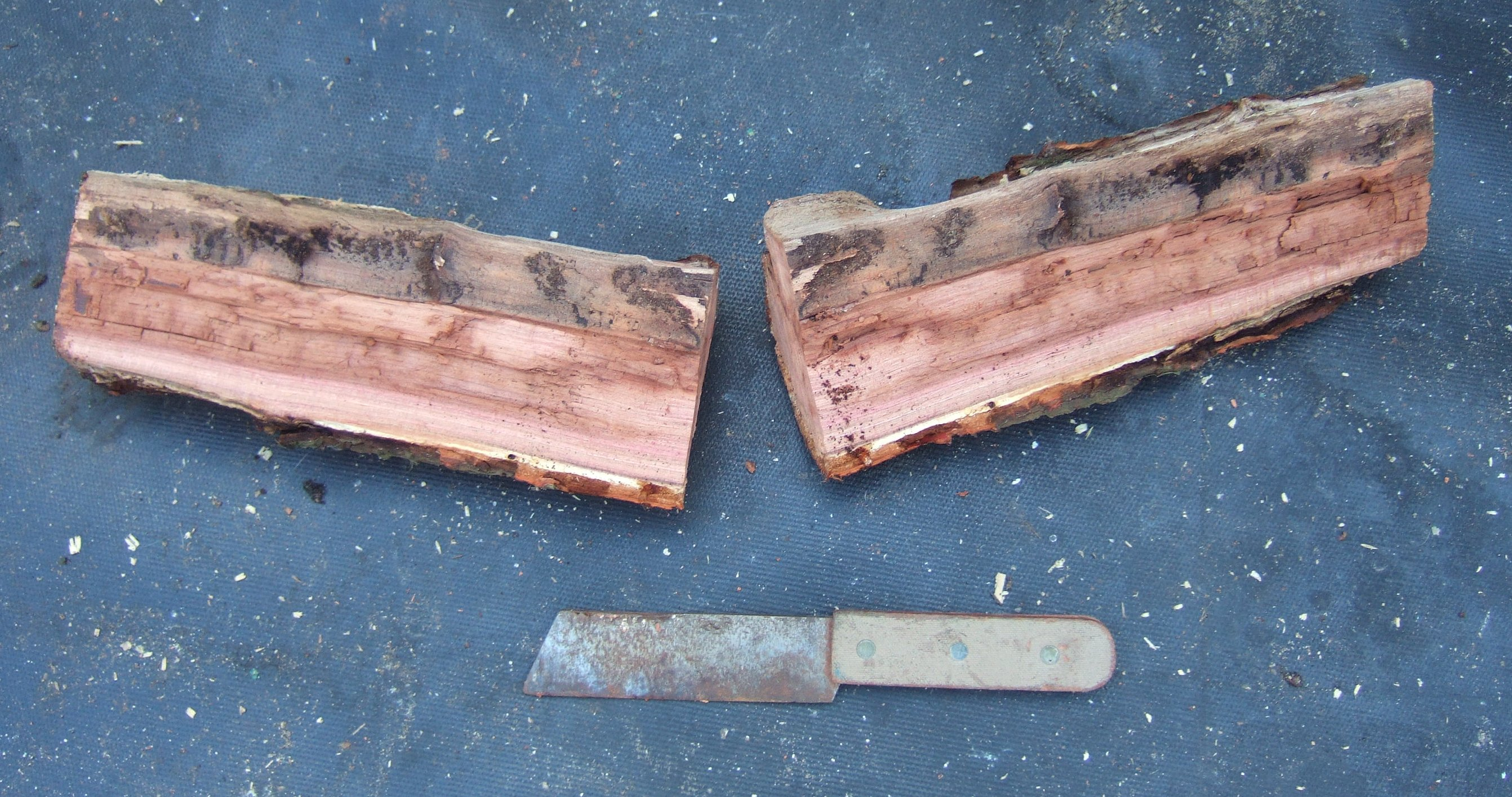
A split billet

A billet was a specific and standardised form of wood fuel of significant importance in the traditional pre–fossil fuel economy. The term could also be applied to a cudgel.

== Nature and use ==
Billets were especially designed for burning on open hearth fires, often in conjunction with spits.

== Measurements and cost ==
The 16th C standardised a billet as three foot four inches in length, and ten inches around.

A century later, Anthony A Wood recorded a load of billet wood as costing 12s 6d; while extravagance consisted of "burning in one yeare threescore pounds worth of the choicest billet".

== Literary references ==
- The William Shakespeare play Measure for Measure contains the phrase "beat out my brains with billets".

== See also ==
- Bavin (wood)
- Fascine
- billet (heraldry)
