= Log, Russia =

Log (Russian: Лог) is the name of several rural localities in Russia:

- Log, Novosokolnichesky District, Pskov Oblast, a village in Novosokolnichesky District, Pskov Oblast
- Log, Porkhovsky District, Pskov Oblast, a village in Porkhovsky District, Pskov Oblast
- Log, Pskovsky District, Pskov Oblast, a village in Pskovsky District, Pskov Oblast
- Log, Vladimir Oblast, a village in Vyaznikovsky District of Vladimir Oblast
- Log, Volgograd Oblast, a selo in Logovsky Selsoviet of Ilovlinsky District of Volgograd Oblast
- Log, Vologda Oblast, a village in Velikoselsky Selsoviet of Kaduysky District of Vologda Oblast
- Log, Voronezh Oblast, a selo in Nizhnedevitskoye Rural Settlement of Nizhnedevitsky District of Voronezh Oblast

== See also ==
- Log (disambiguation)
