= Cleaving axe =

Axe used for splitting wood

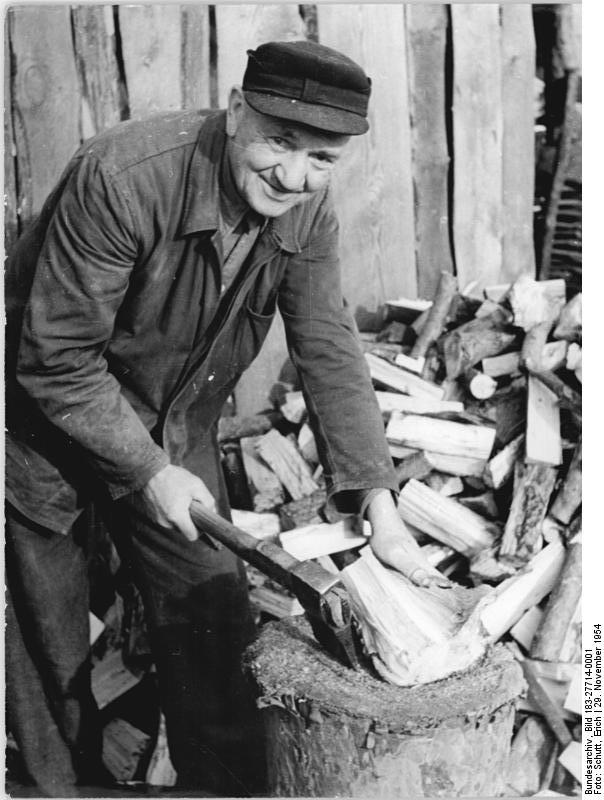
Using a cleaving axe. Attribution: Bundesarchiv, Bild 183-27714-0001 / CC-BY-SA

A cleaving axe or cleaver is a form of axe used within green woodworking to split wood lengthways. Cleaving (riving) is used to turn a log into lumber or billets (short or thick pieces of wood) into firewood. Splitting axe is sometimes described as an old name for a splitting maul or froe.

== Overview ==
A cleaving axe resembles a felling axe but is heavier, more wedge shaped, not sharp-edged and the poll is flat for driving wedges. The edge is of medium length, almost straight with just a slight camber, and symmetrical top and bottom. A section through the edge is that of a simple splitting wedge. The edge itself does not need to be sharp: cleaving relies more on wedge action than chopping (cutting) with an edge. The section of the axe should be triangular though, with flat sides, rather than the deeply hollow-sided forged and welded axes, or the modern convex-sided "apple pip" axe grind. Nor should the edge be ground at a bevel. The work of using the axe, and its ability to split cleanly, depends on having flat sides with the minimum of friction, rather than all the force of the timber being concentrated on one protruding line. The handle is straight and fairly short, around 18 in (460 mm), as the cleaving axe is only held, not swung. As the axe head must penetrate fully into the wood, the poll is minimal, narrower than the axe cheeks, and is never used for pounding other tools, lest it damage or mushroom the head.

== Cleaving ==
Wood cleaving

Cleaving is done by driving a wedge between the fibres of a log, so as to split fibres apart along their weakest path. This work may appear strenuous, but is far less effort than rip sawing by hand. It is first done radially, to split the log into wedged segments. Timbers with medullary rays, such as oak, may be hard to split through these radial rays and so careful alignment is made to split between them. Segments are halved symmetrically at each step, as this encourages them to split more evenly than attempting to cleave off thin sheets repeatedly from one end.

Cleaving usually begins from one end of a log, by driving the cleaving axe or a splitting wedge into the end of the log. It is driven further by use of a mallet or froe club. As always, a hammer should be avoided when striking a hard steel tool, as it damages the tool by mushrooming it and may even cause cracking. A short log may be split entirely from one end, a long log will require an initial split to be extended along the log by the use of axe or wedges, driven in from the sides. Short logs are cleaved vertically, long ones horizontally.

The ability to use several tools at once makes the use of an axe and wedges capable of cleaving far heavier logs than a froe. The froe must also be used gradually from one end, the axe (or wedges) may enter the log from the side. The froe does however have a wider blade, and so may give a more precisely flat surface when cleaving wide timber, such as for roofing shingles. It is common to start cleaving a log with an axe, finish the first heavy splits with wedges, then use a froe to make the finished items.

== Related tools ==
- Billhook, used for light cleaving of withies.
- Froe, a precise tool for cleaving wide sections.
- Side knife, a light froe.
- Splitting wedge, used in multiple, for initial heavy splitting.

=== Splitting axes ===
Splitting mauls are heavy axes (6 lbs or more) used for rough splitting of firewood. They have small heads in terms of edge length, but are heavy as they are especially wide across the cheeks and have a steep taper for rapid splitting. To provide the power necessary, they have full-length shafts and are used with a full swing at the log. Splitting is usually done to logs that are already sawn to length and so they may be split vertically. To split longer logs, wedges are driven with the heavy poll of this maul, giving its alternative name of "hammer-poll axe".

Splitting axes are inconsistently described. Some are cleaving axes, used for green woodworking. Others are a crude firewood-splitting axe, but without the heavy poll of a maul. Light axes, unless specifically intended for it, should never be used for hammering with their poll.
