= Split log =

Split log may refer to:

- Wood splitting
- Billet (wood), a first step in green woodworking manufacture
- Shake (shingle)
- Puncheon log, a slab of timber with one face smoothed, used for flooring or construction, as described at Copus massacre

== Tools ==
- Log (disambiguation)
- Log splitter
- Splitting maul
