= Wood splitting =

Process of cleaving wood into lumber along the grain

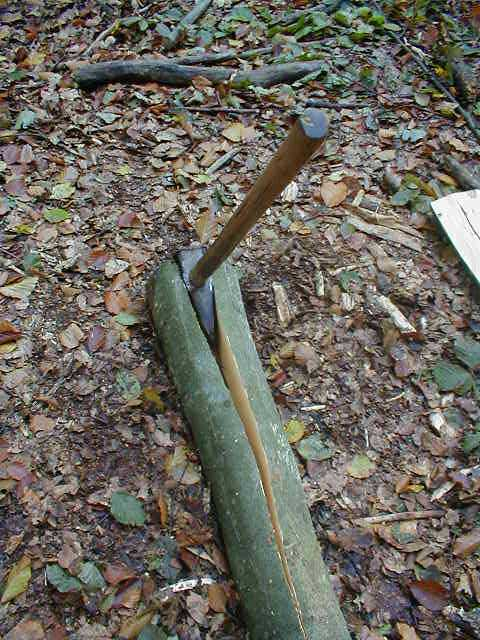
Splitting or riving a log

Bucking, splitting and stacking logs for firewood in Kõrvemaa, Estonia (October 2022)

Wood splitting (riving, cleaving) is an ancient technique used in carpentry to make lumber for making wooden objects, some basket weaving, and to make firewood. Unlike wood sawing, the wood is split along the grain using tools such as a hammer and wedges, splitting maul, cleaving axe, side knife, or froe.

== Woodworking ==
In woodworking carpenters use a wooden siding which gets its name, clapboard, from originally being split from logs—the sound of the plank against the log being a clap. This is used in clapboard architecture and for wainscoting. Coopers use oak clapboards to make barrel staves. Split-rail fences are made with split wood.

== Basket making ==
Some Native Americans traditionally make baskets from black ash by pounding the wood with a mallet and pulling long strips from the log.

== Firewood ==
Log splitting is the act of splitting firewood from logs that have been pre-cut into sections (rounds, bolts, billets). This can be done by hand using an axe or maul, or by using a mechanical log splitter. When splitting a log by hand, it is best to aim for the cracks (called checks), if there are any visible. Some types of wood are harder to split than others, including extremely hard woods, as well as types like gum which an axe will often bounce off, and cherry, which is typically so twisted it's near impossible to get a clean split, and elm. Any type of wood, being thick or tall, having large knots or twisted grain can make it difficult to split. In some cases, it is easiest to aim for the edges and split the log into multiple pieces. Batoning is splitting small pieces of wood for kindling or other purposes sometimes with a batoning chisel, a special chisel with one sharp side used for splitting.

== Advantages ==
The advantages of splitting wood along its grain, rather than sawing it is that the wood is much stronger. Due to this, it was historically used for building ships (e.g. drekars) and traditional skis. A defining feature of shakes, which are like shingles, is that they are split rather than sawn and because the cell structure of the wood remains intact may be more durable, and similarly trunnels when split are stronger than when sawn.

== Prevention ==
Sometimes wood splitting is undesirable. Methods to prevent splitting in woodworking are the butterfly joint, truss connector plates, or metal straps. Columns may be hollowed in the center to prevent splitting. Nail points may be blunted or pilot holes drilled to prevent splitting of lumber while nailing or screwing. End grain sealers are liquid products usually containing wax which help prevent rapid drying of the ends of lumber resulting in splits. Metal end plates or S-shaped pieces of metal may be driven into the butt ends of a timber. Splitting is the primary reason building codes do not allow notching in the bottom of joists and beams.
