= Axe =

Type of wedge tool

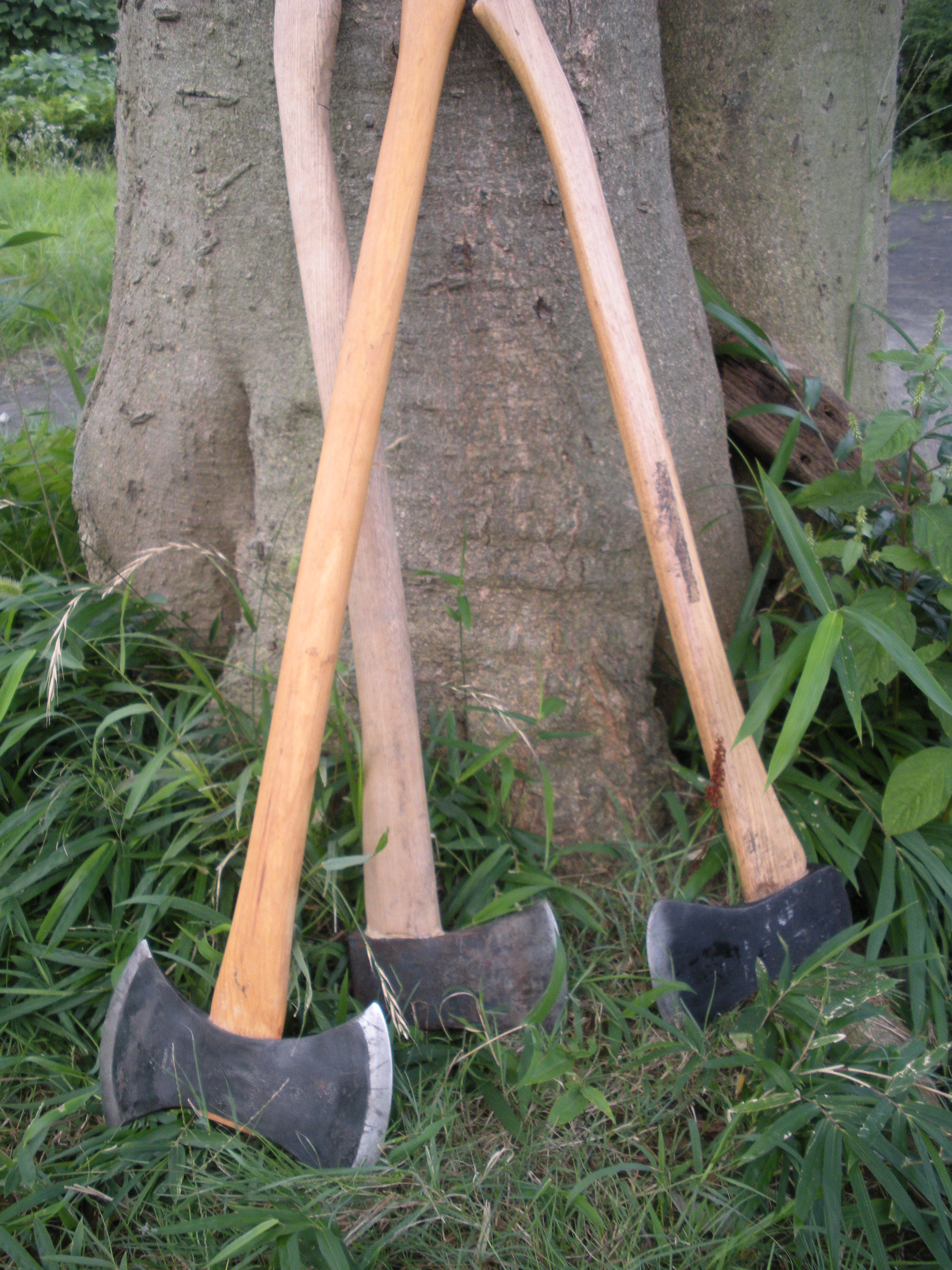
Double- and single-bit felling axes A diagram showing the main points on an axe

An axe (/æks/; sometimes spelled ax in American English; see spelling differences) is an implement that has been used for thousands of years to shape, split, and cut wood, to harvest timber, and as a weapon. The axe has many forms and specialised uses but generally consists of a head with a sharpened blade (also called a "bit") attached to a handle (also called "haft" or "helve").

Before the modern axe, the stone-age hand axe without a handle was used from 1.5 million years BP. Hafted axes (those with a handle) date from at least 46,000 years BP by Northern Indigenous Australians. The earliest examples of handled axes have heads of stone with some form of wooden handle attached (hafted) in a method to suit the available materials and use. Axes made of copper, bronze, iron and steel appeared as these technologies developed.

The axe is an example of a simple machine, as it is a type of wedge, or dual inclined plane. This reduces the effort needed by the wood chopper. It cuts and splits the wood into two parts by the pressure concentration at the blade and then the movement of the head in behind the initial cut. The handle of the axe also acts as a lever allowing the user to increase the force at the cutting edge. Generally, the blades of 'cutting axes', which are used for felling, limbing, and bucking, have a shallow (acute) wedge angle, whereas 'splitting axes' have a deeper (more obtuse) angle. Most axes are double bevelled (i.e. symmetrical about the axis of the blade), but some specialist broadaxes have a single bevel blade.

Most modern axes have steel heads and wooden handles, although plastic or fibreglass handles are also common. Modern axes are specialised by use, size and form. Hafted axes with short handles designed for use with one hand are often called "hand axes", but the term "hand axe" can also refer to an axe without a handle. Hatchets tend to be short-, small-hafted axes often with a hammer on the back side (the poll, or butt). Relatively easy to make and use, the axe has frequently been used in combat, and is one of humanity's oldest weapons. Axes are also linchpins to the competitive sport of wood-chopping.

== History ==
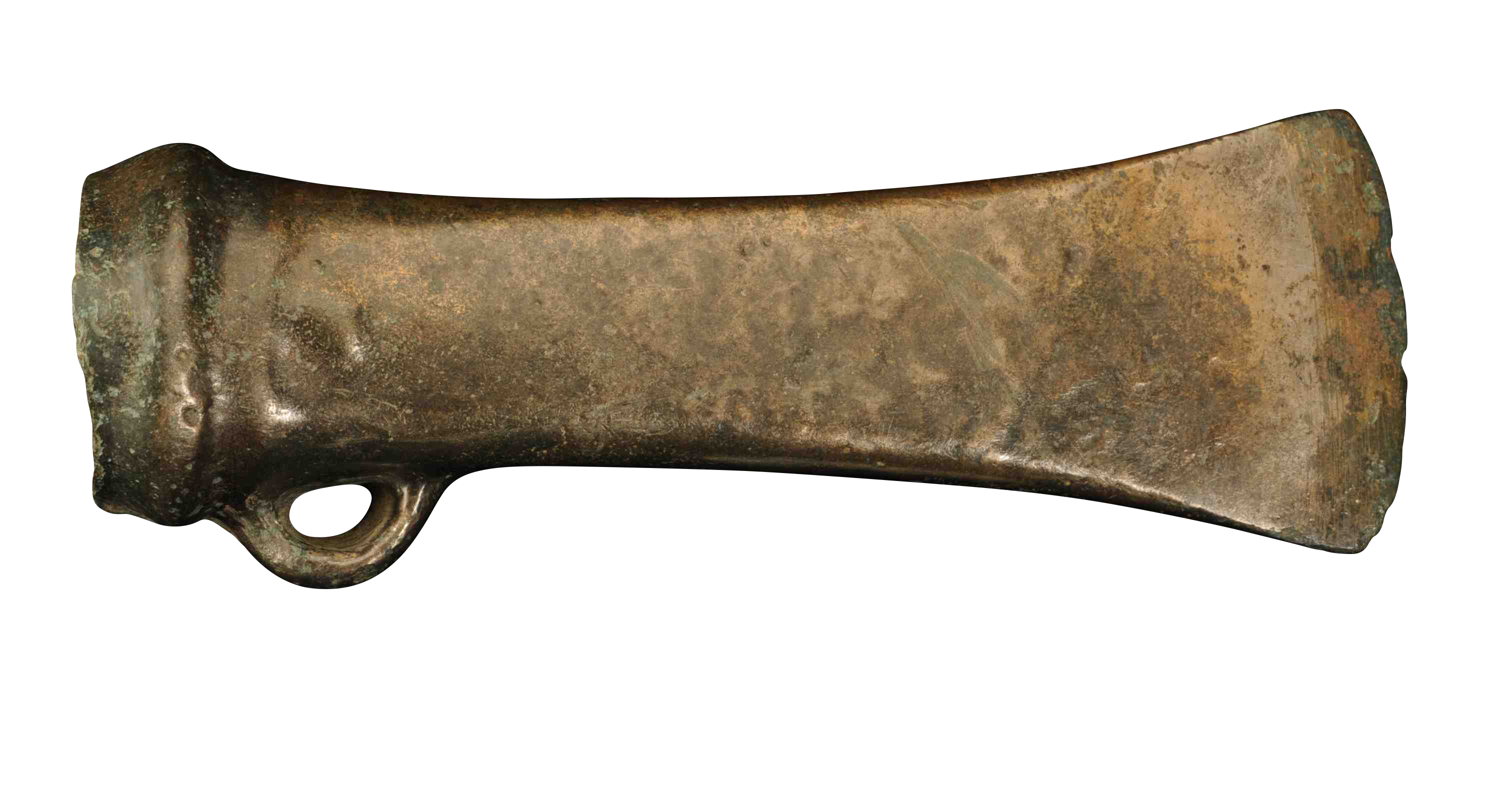
Bronze socketed axe from the Heppeneert hoard (Belgium), about 800 BCE, collection of the King Baudouin Foundation, Gallo-Roman Museum (Tongeren)

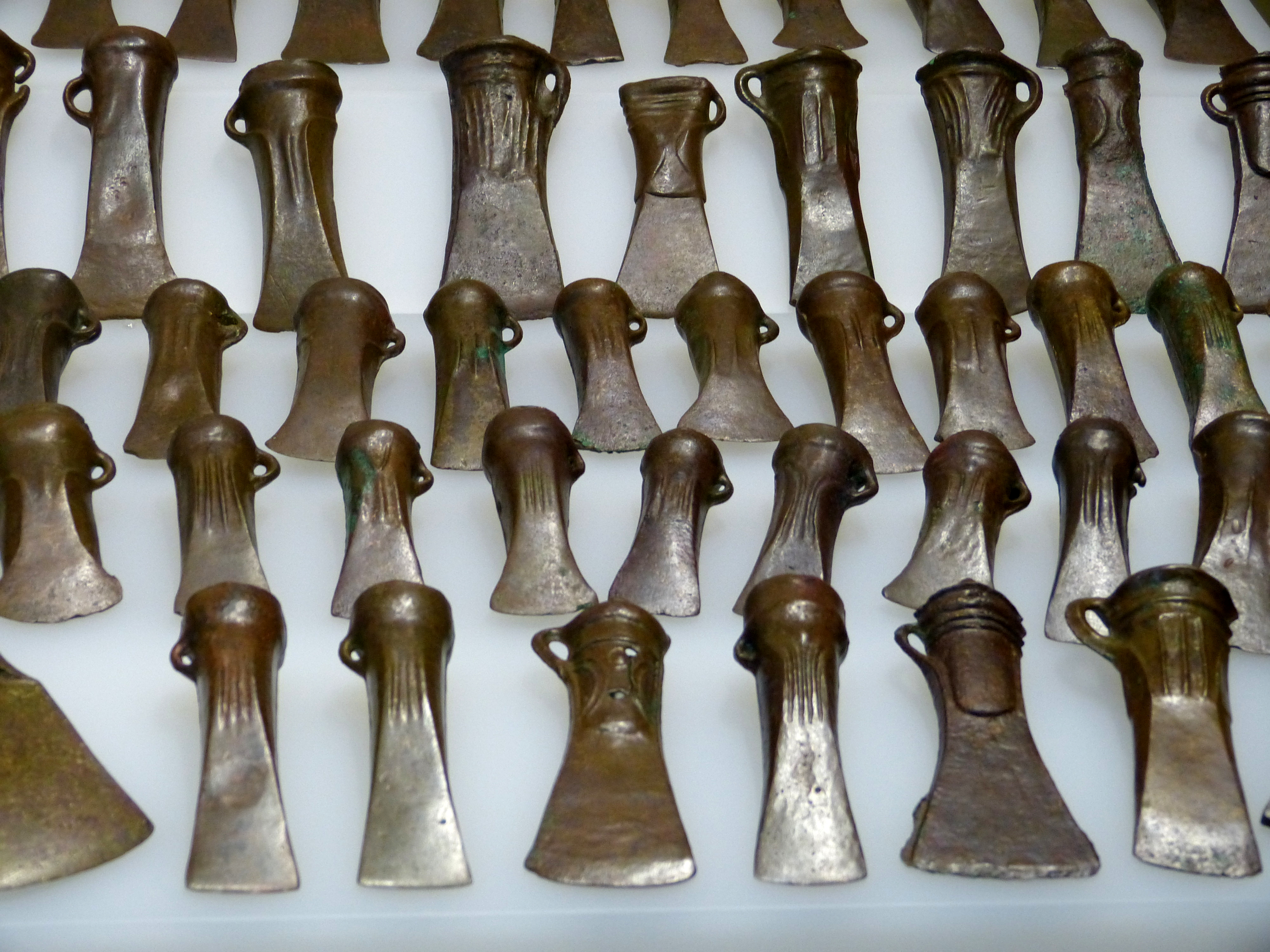
A collection of bronze socketed axe blades from the Bronze Age found in Germany. This was the prime tool of the period, and also seems to have been used as a store of value.

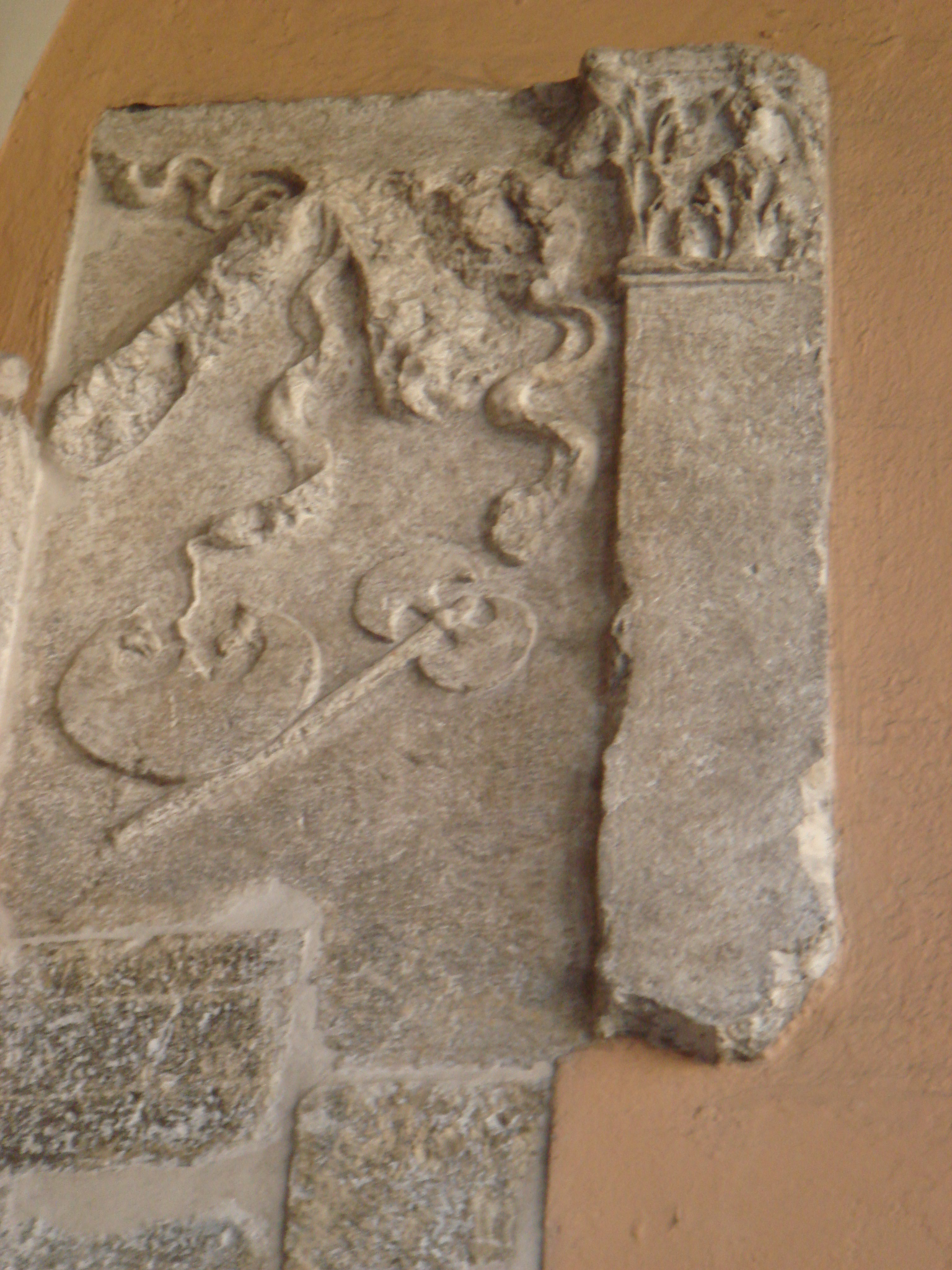
Roman axes in an ancient Roman relief in Brescia, Italy

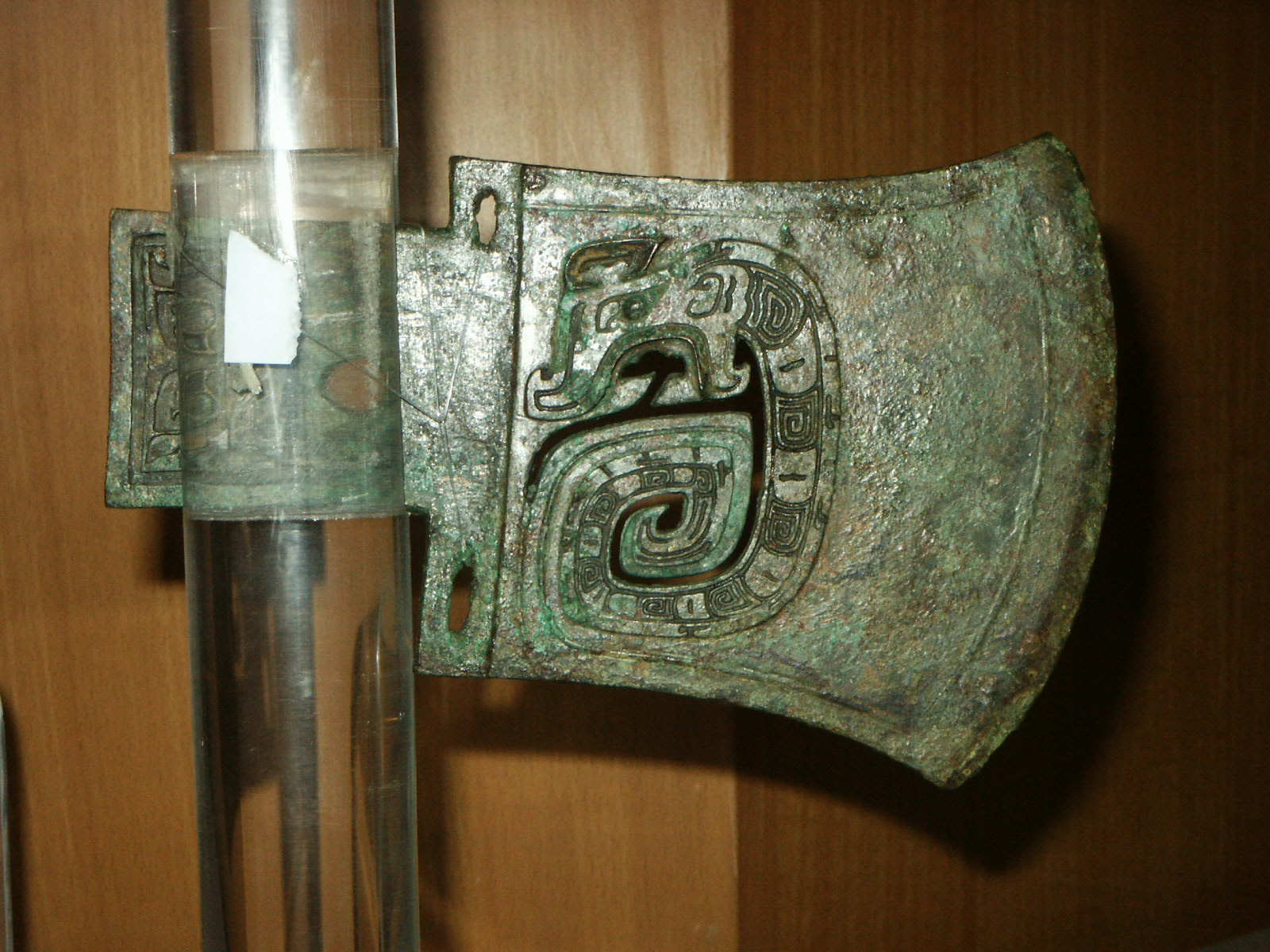
Shang dynasty axe

Hand axes, of stone, and used without handles (hafts) were the first axes. They had knapped (chipped) cutting edges of flint or other stone. Early examples of hand axes date back to 1.6 mya in the later Oldowan, in Southern Ethiopia around 1.4 mya, and in 1.2 mya deposits in Olduvai Gorge.

Stone axes made with ground cutting edges were first developed in the late Pleistocene in Australia. Ground-edge axe heads have been recovered from the earliest occupation layers at Madjedbebe, on the western edge of the Arnhem Land plateau in Kakadu National Park, dated to around 65,000 years ago. A fragment of a ground-edge axe from the Kimberley has been dated to 44,000–49,000 years ago, and one from Jawoyn Country in Arnhem Land to about 35,400 years ago.

Ground-edge axes were later present in Japan some time around 38,000 BP, and are known from several Upper Palaeolithic sites on the islands of Honshu and Kyushu. Hafted axes are first known from the Mesolithic period (c. 6000 BC). Few wooden hafts have been found from this period, but it seems that the axe was normally hafted by wedging. Birch-tar and rawhide lashings were used to fix the blade.

The distribution of stone axes is an important indication of prehistoric trade. Thin sectioning is used to determine the provenance of the stone blades. In Europe, Neolithic "axe factories", where thousands of ground stone axes were roughed out, are known from many places, such as:

- Great Langdale, England (tuff)
- Rathlin Island, Ireland (porcellanite)
- Krzemionki, Poland (flint)
- Neolithic flint mines of Spiennes, Belgium (flint)
- Plancher-les-Mines, France (pelite)
- Aosta Valley, Italy (omphacite).

Stone axes are still produced and in use today in parts of Papua, Indonesia. The Mount Hagen area of Papua New Guinea was an important production centre.

From the late Neolithic/Chalcolithic onwards, axes were made of copper or copper mixed with arsenic. These axes were flat and hafted much like their stone predecessors. Axes continued to be made in this manner with the introduction of bronze metallurgy. Eventually the hafting method changed and the flat axe developed into the "flanged axe", then palstaves, and later winged and socketed axes.

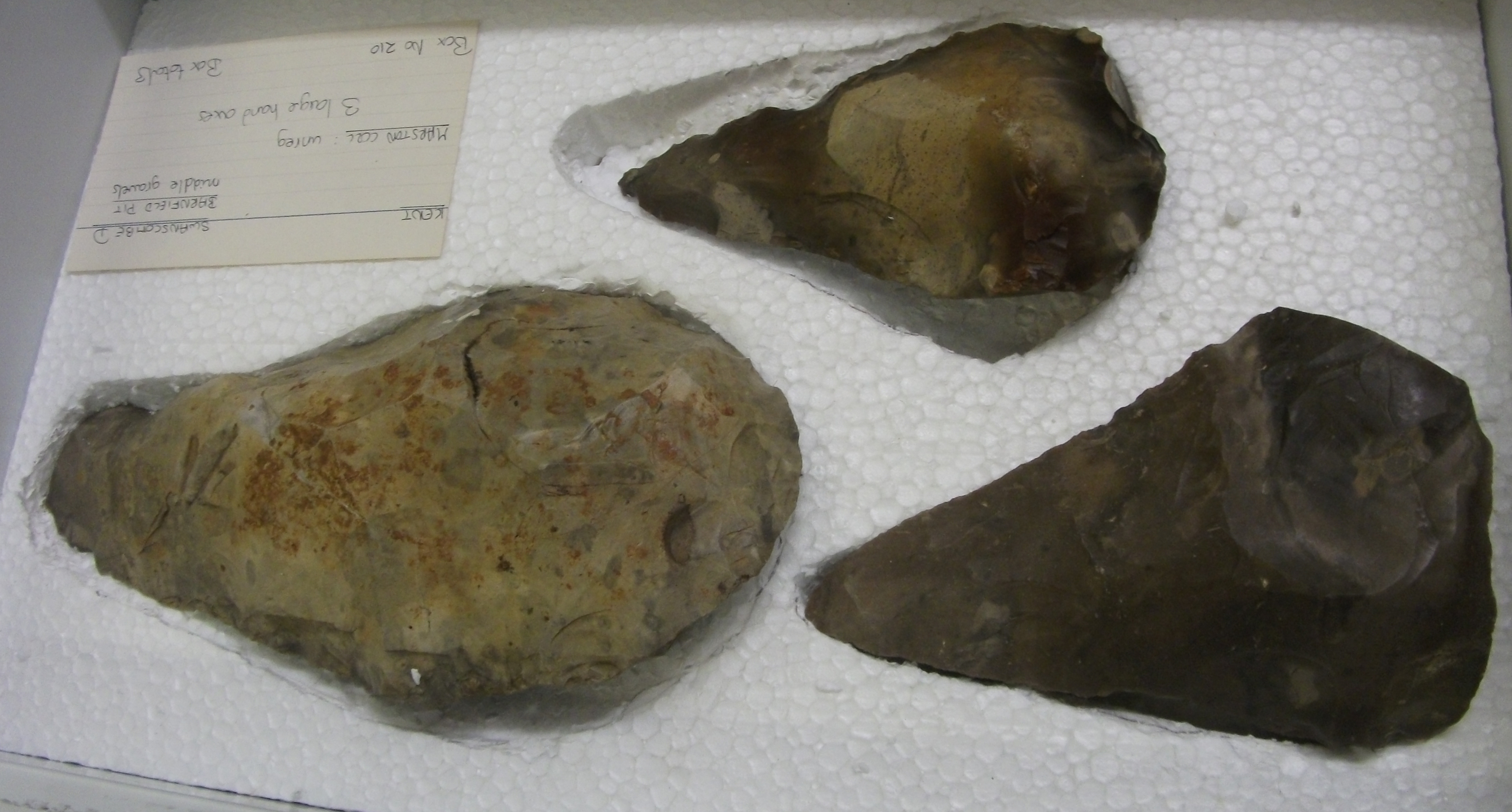
Hand axes from Swanscombe at the British Museum that belongs to Swanscombe Man who lived 200,000–300,000 years ago

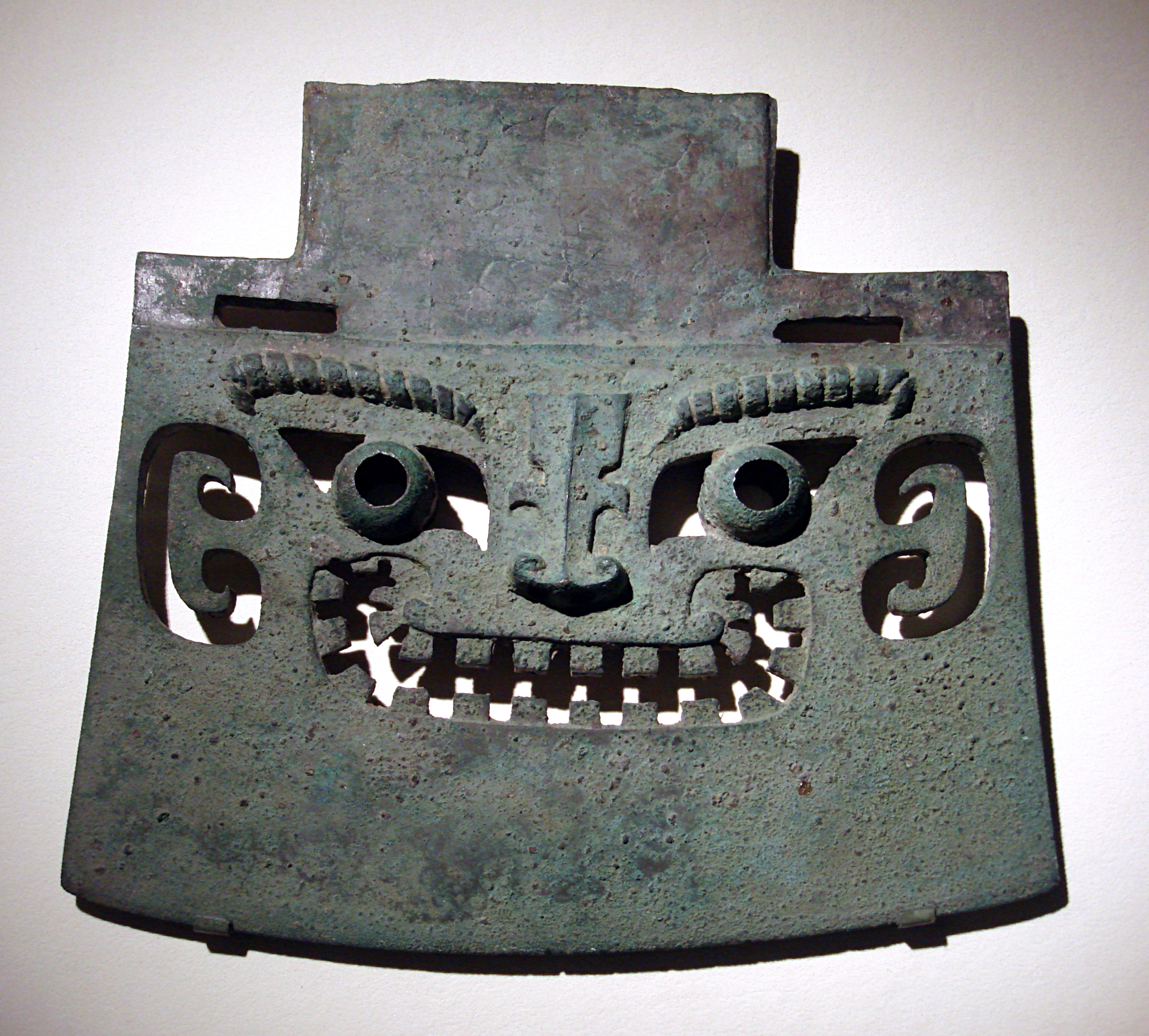
A bronze axe from the Chinese Shang dynasty, 12th to 11th centuries BC

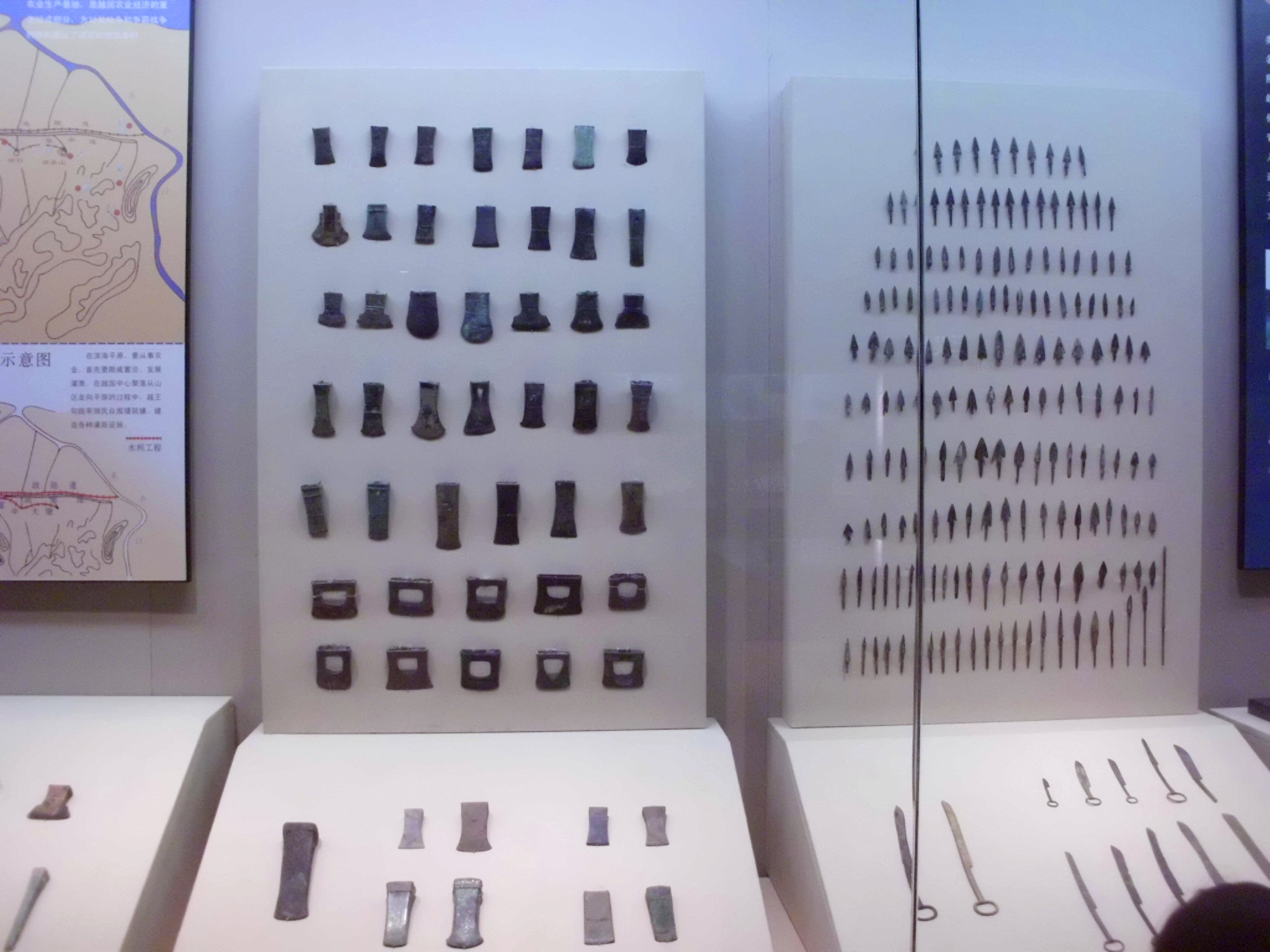
Various Warring States period axes

== Symbolism, ritual, and folklore ==
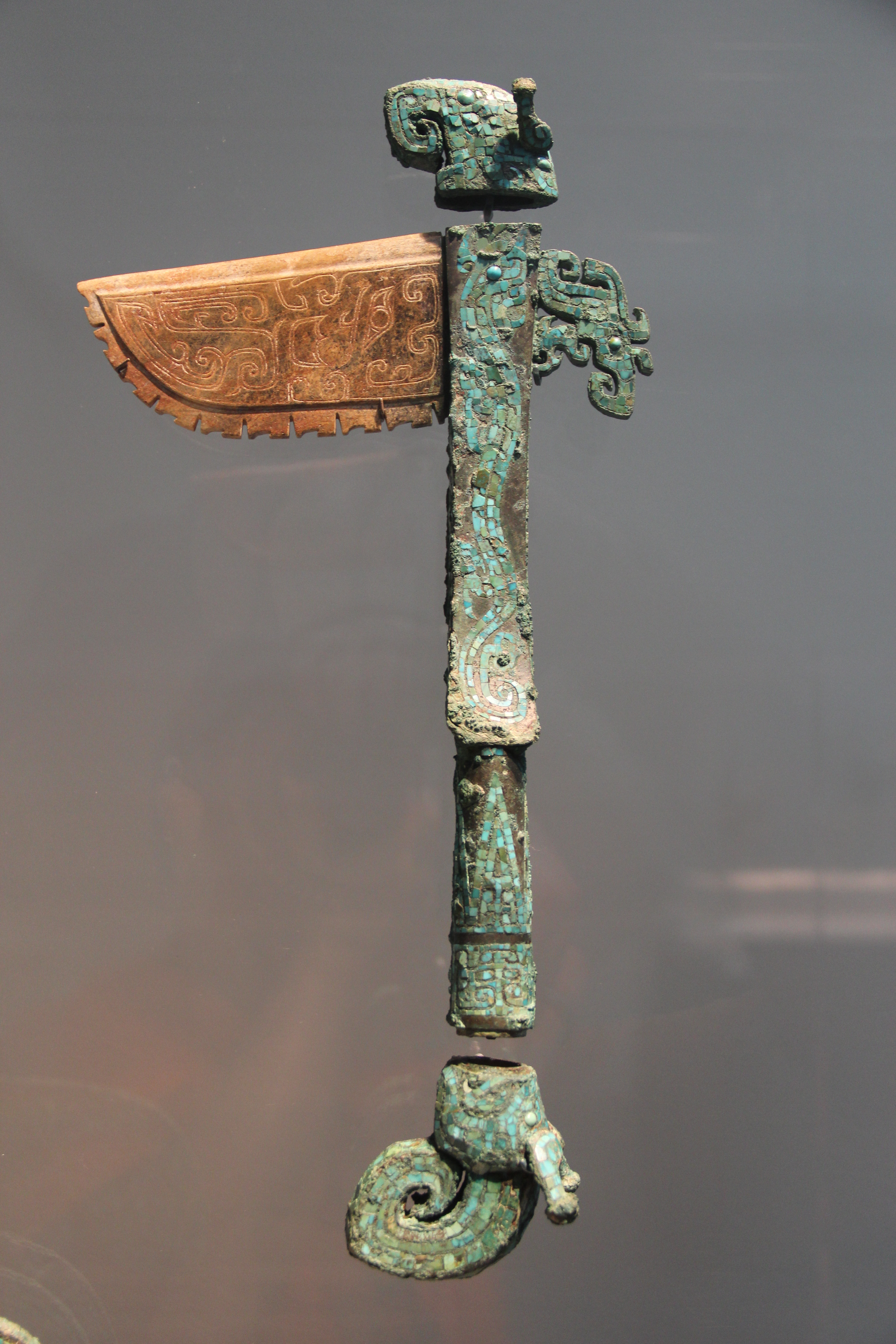
Jade axe, Shang dynasty

T7
Axe
in hieroglyphs

T7A
Axe alternative
in hieroglyphs

At least since the late Neolithic, elaborate axes (battle-axes, T-axes, etc.) had a religious significance and probably indicated the exalted status of their owner. Certain types almost never show traces of wear; deposits of unshafted axe blades from the middle Neolithic (such as at the Somerset Levels in Britain) may have been gifts to the deities.

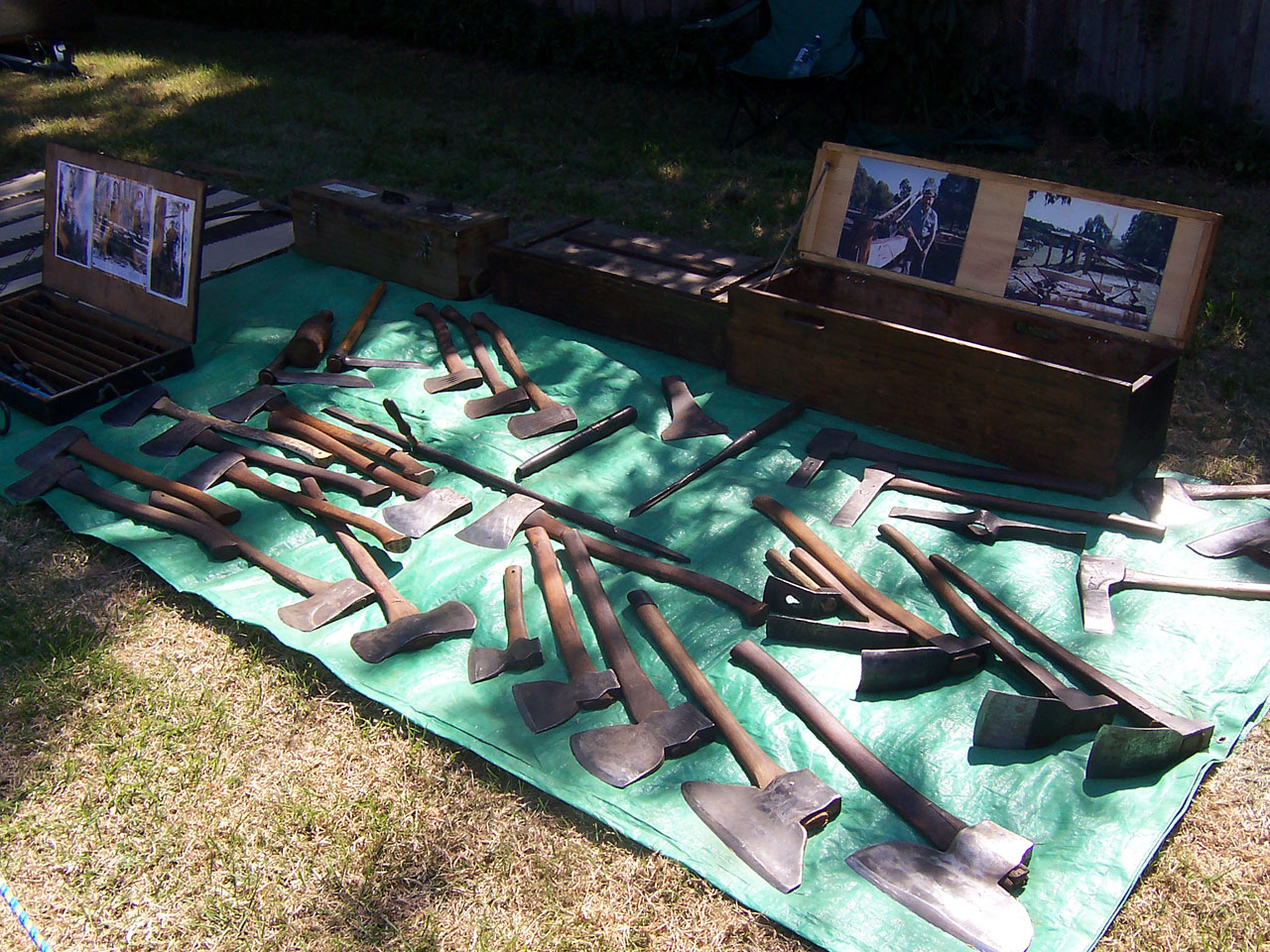
A collection of old Australian cutting tools including broad axes, broad hatchets, mortising axes, carpenter's axes, and felling axes. Also five adzes, a corner chisel, two froes, and a twybil.

In Minoan Crete, the double axe (labrys) had a special significance, used by priestesses in religious ceremonies.

In 1998, a labrys, complete with an elaborately embellished haft, was found at Cham-Eslen, Canton of Zug, Switzerland. The haft was 120 cm (47 in) long and wrapped in ornamented birch-bark. The axe blade is 17.4 cm (6.9 in) long and made of antigorite, mined in the Gotthard-area. The haft goes through a biconical drilled hole and is fastened by wedges of antler and by birch-tar. It belongs to the early Cortaillod culture.

The coat of arms of Norway features a lion rampant carrying an axe which represents King Olaf II of Norway, who was honoured as the Eternal King of Norway.

Axe pictured in the coat of arms of Tórshavn

Two axes pictured in the former coat of arms of Kalvola

In folklore, stone axes were sometimes believed to be thunderbolts and were used to guard buildings against lightning, as it was believed (mythically) that lightning never struck the same place twice. This has caused some skewing of axe distributions.

Steel axes were important in superstition as well. A thrown axe could keep off a hailstorm, sometimes an axe was placed in the crops, with the cutting edge to the skies to protect the harvest against bad weather. An upright axe buried under the sill of a house would keep off witches, while an axe under the bed would assure male offspring.

Basques, Australians and New Zealanders have developed variants of rural sports that perpetuate the traditions of log cutting with axe. The Basque variants, splitting horizontally or vertically disposed logs, are generically called aizkolaritza (from aizkora: axe).

In Yorùbá mythology, the oshe (double-headed axe) symbolises Shango, Orisha (god) of thunder and lightning. It is said to represent swift and balanced justice. Shango altars often contain a carved figure of a woman holding a gift to the god with a double-bladed axe sticking up from her head.

The Hurrian and Hittite weather god Teshub is depicted on a bas-relief at Ivriz wielding a thunderbolt and an axe.

The Arkalochori Axe is a bronze Minoan axe from the second millennium BC thought to be used for religious purposes. Inscriptions on this axe have been compared with other ancient writing systems.

In Mark Masonry, the axe is a symbol of punishment meant to remind Mark Master Masons to be truthful and avoid deceit.

== Types ==
=== Axes designed to cut or shape wood ===
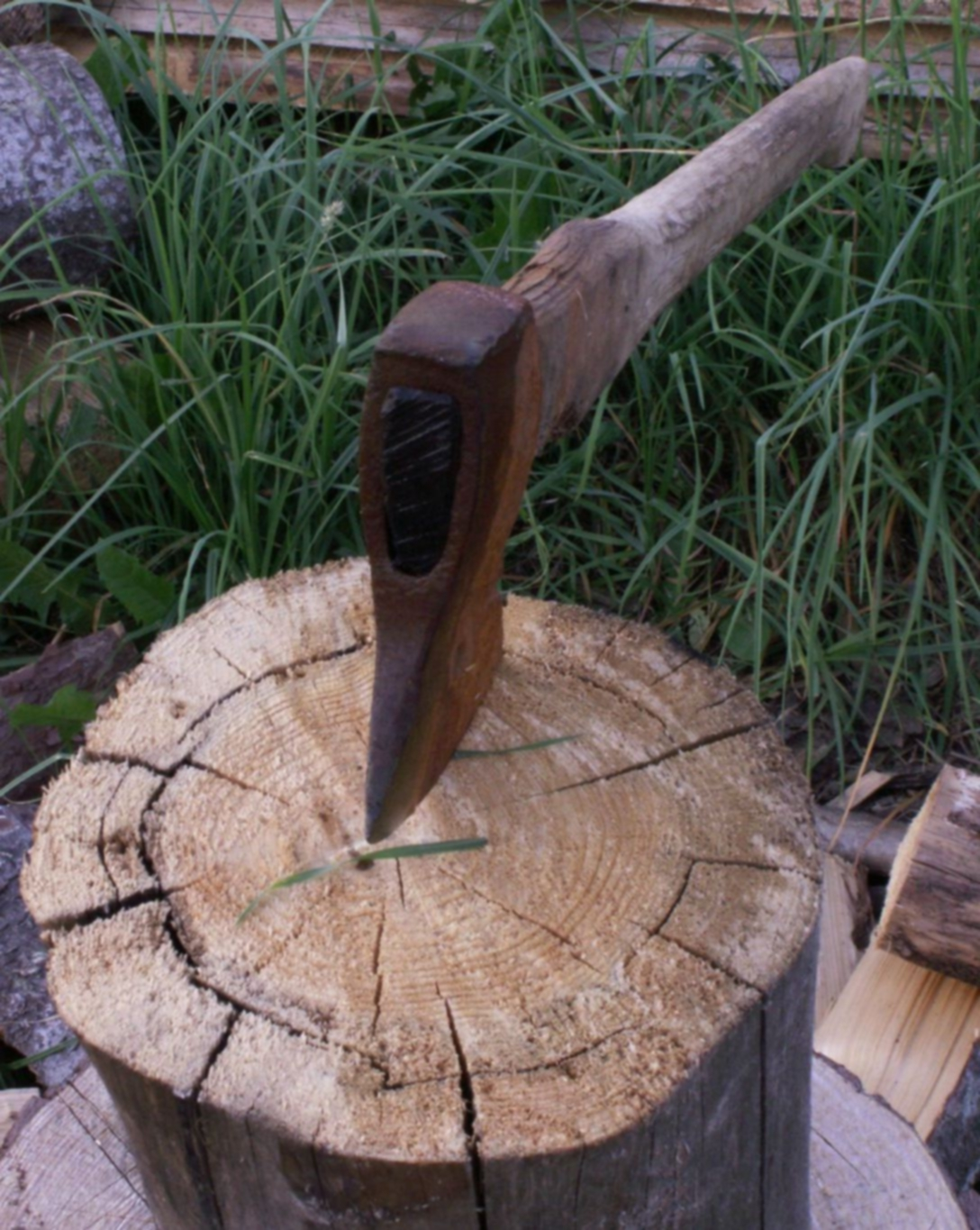
Splitting axe

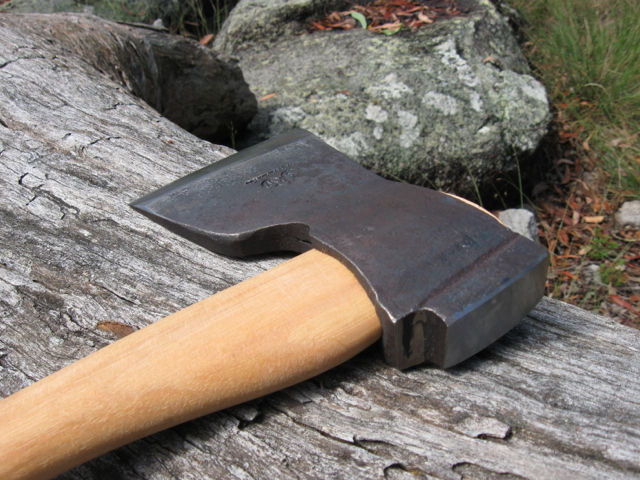
A Swedish carpenter's axe

- Broadaxe: Used with the grain of the wood in precision splitting or "hewing" (i.e. the squaring-off of round timbers usually for use in construction). Broad axe bits are most commonly chisel-shaped (i.e. one flat and one beveled edge) facilitating more controlled work as the flat cheek passes along the squared timber.
- Adze: A variation featuring a head perpendicular to that of an axe. Rather than splitting wood side-by-side, it is used to rip a level surface into a horizontal piece of wood. It can also be used as a pickaxe for breaking up rocks and clay.
- Hatchet: A small, light axe designed for use in one hand specifically while camping or travelling.
- Carpenter's axe: A small axe, usually slightly larger than a hatchet, used in traditional woodwork, joinery and log-building. It has a pronounced beard and finger notch to allow a "choked" grip for precise control. The poll is designed for use as a hammer.
- Hand axe: A small axe used for intermediate chopping, similar to hatchets.
- Mortising axe: Used for creating mortises, a process which begins by drilling two holes at the ends of the intended mortise. Then the wood between the holes is removed with the mortising axe. Some forms of the tool have one blade, which may be pushed, swung or struck with a mallet. Others, such as twybil, bisaigüe and piochon have two, one of which is used for separating the fibres, and the other for levering out the waste.

=== Axes as weapons ===
- Battle axe: In its most common form, an arm-length weapon borne in one or both hands. Compared to a sword swing, it delivers more cleaving power against a smaller target area, making it more effective against armour, due to concentrating more of its weight in the axehead.
- Dagger-axe (Ji or Ge): A variant of Chinese polearm-like weapon with a divided two-part head, comprising the usual straight blade and a scythe-like blade. The straight blade is used to stab or feint, then the foe's body or head may be cut by pulling the scythe-like horizontal blade backwards. Ge has the horizontal blade but sometimes does not have the straight spear.
- Dane axe: a long-handled weapon with a large flat blade, often attributed to the Norsemen.
- Halberd: a spear-like weapon with a hooked poll, effective against mounted cavalry.
- Head axe: a type of thin-bladed axe with a distinctive shape specialized for headhunting from the Cordilleran peoples of the Philippines.
- Hurlbat: An entirely metal throwing axe sharpened on every auxiliary end to a point or blade, practically guaranteeing some form of damage against its target.
- Ono: a Japanese weapon wielded by sōhei warrior monks.
- Panabas: A chopping bladed tool or weapon from the Philippines often described as a cross between a sword and a battle axe.
- Parashu: The parashu (Sanskrit: paraṣu) is an Indian battle-axe. It is generally wielded with two hands but could also be used with only one. It is depicted as the primary weapon of Parashurama, the 6th Avatar of Lord Vishnu in Hinduism.
- Poleaxe: designed to defeat plate armour. Its axe (or hammer) head is much narrower than other axes, which accounts for its penetrating power.
- Sagaris: An ancient weapon used by Scythians.
- Shepherd's axe: used by shepherds in the Carpathian Mountains, it could double as a walking stick.
- Throwing axe: A weapon that was thrown and designed to strike with a similar splitting action as its handheld counterparts. These are often small in profile and usable with one hand.
- Tomahawk: used almost exclusively by Native Americans, its blade was originally crafted of stone. Along with the familiar war version, which could be fashioned as a throwing weapon, the pipe tomahawk was a ceremonial and diplomatic tool.
- Yue: A Chinese weapon with very large axe blade, also served as ceremonial weapon.

=== Axes as tools ===
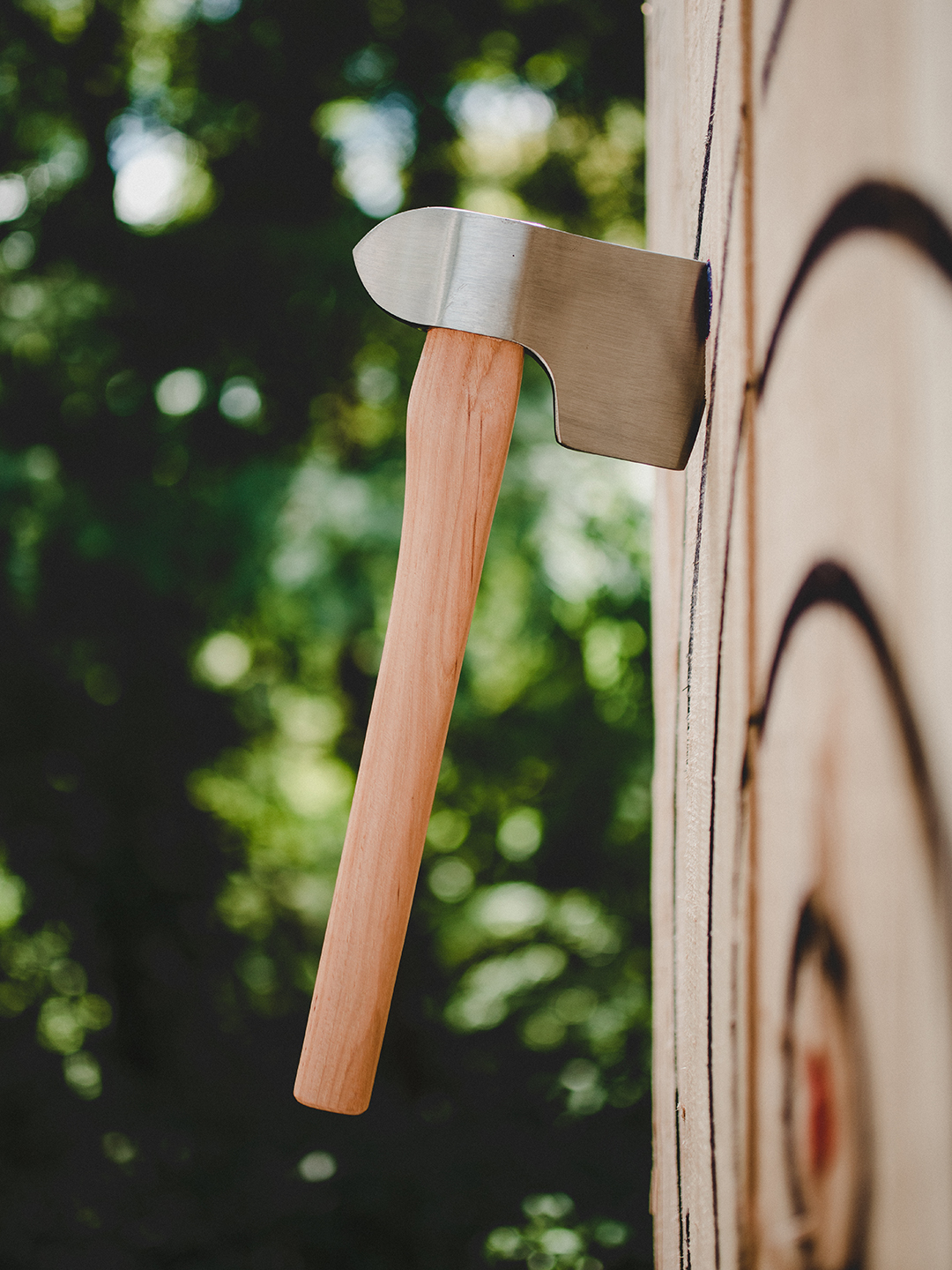
A sport throwing axe embedded into a wood target.

- Crash axe: An axe carried as emergency equipment aboard certain aircraft. It may be used to cut or punch through aircraft interior panels to gain access to a hidden fire. European Union regulations require aeroplanes with a maximum certified take-off mass of more than 5,700 kg (12,600 lb), or a maximum operational passenger seating configuration of more than nine, to have at least one crash axe or crowbar in the flight crew compartment (cockpit). Aeroplanes configured for more than 200 passengers must have an additional crash axe or crowbar in or near the rearmost galley, and crash axes or crowbars located in the passenger compartment must not be visible to passengers. In the United States, regulations governing air-carrier operations under Part 121 require each airplane to be equipped with a crash axe, except for certain nontransport-category airplanes.
- Ice axe or climbing axe: A number of different styles of ice axes are designed for ice climbing and enlarging steps used by climbers.
- Mattock: A dual-purpose axe, combining an adze and axe blade, or sometimes a pick and adze blade.*
- Pickaxe: An axe with a large pointed end, rather than a flat blade. Sometimes exists as a double-bladed tool with a pick on one side and an axe or adze head on the other. Often used to break up hard material.
- Pulaski: An axe with a mattock blade built into the rear of the main axe blade, used for digging ('grubbing out') through and around roots as well as chopping.
- Splitting maul: A splitting implement that has evolved from the simple "wedge" design to more complex designs.

=== Axes for sport ===
- Throwing axe: A tool that was thrown and designed to strike wooden targets and stay embedded in the target to score points in sport throwing competitions such as those hosted by the World Axe Throwing League. These can range from axes that are small in profile and usable with one hand, or longer axes thrown with two hands.
- Racing axe: A tool designed for competitive wood chopping sports such as the Stihl Timbersports Series.

== Hammer axe ==
Hammer axes (or axe-hammers) typically feature an extended poll, opposite the blade, shaped and sometimes hardened for use as a hammer. The name axe-hammer is often applied to a characteristic shape of perforated stone axe used in the Neolithic and Bronze Ages. Iron axe-hammers are found in Roman military contexts, e.g. Cramond, Edinburgh, and South Shields, Tyne and Wear.

== See also ==
- Axe murder
- Cleaving axe
- Corded Ware culture
- Fasces
- Kaiser blade
- Nzappa zap
- Sagaris

Related forestry terms

- Felling
- Hewing
- Limbing
- Pruning
- Splitting maul
- Woodchopping
