= Batoning =

Technique of splitting wood

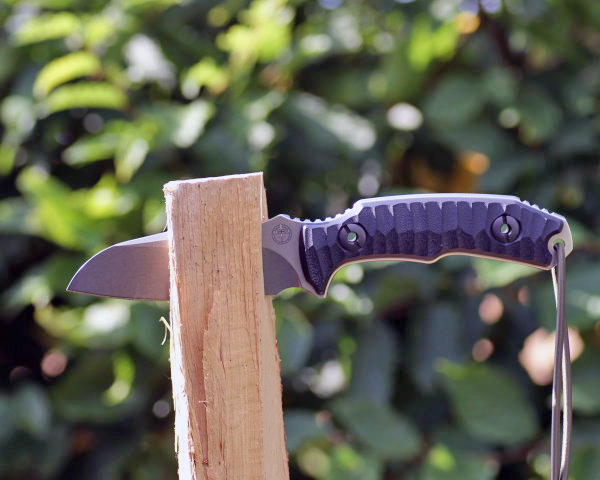
Batoning a piece of wood

Batoning is the technique of cutting or splitting wood by using a baton-sized stick or mallet to repeatedly strike the spine of a sturdy knife, chisel or blade in order to drive it through wood, similar to how a froe is used. The batoning method can be used to make kindling or desired forms such as boards, slats or notches. The practice is most useful for obtaining dry wood from the inside of logs for the purpose of fire making.

== Tools ==
Tools used in batoning are: a strong, fixed-blade, preferably full tang knife or machete with a thick spine, and a club-sized length of dense or green wood for striking the knife's spine and tip.

== Technique ==
The basic method involves repeatedly striking the spine of the knife to force the middle of the blade into the wood. The tip is then struck, to continue forcing the blade deeper, until a split is achieved.

== Uses and advantages ==
This technique is useful for the simple splitting of wood for kindling, to access dry wood within a wet log, and for the production of shingles, slats, or boards. It is also useful for cutting notches, or making clean crosscuts against the grain of the wood. The technique is also especially useful when a chopping tool is not available.

== Hazards ==
Care must be taken to avoid damage to the knife. Breakage of the blade is a common result of striking the spine of the knife at an angle. If this happens the broken blade can become irretrievably embedded within the split. In a survival situation, this can be catastrophic.

== See also ==
- Bushcraft
- Fire making
- Scoutcraft
- Survival skills
- Woodcraft
