= Log, Slovenia =

Settlements, within municipalities in Slovenia, and sometimes called Log include:

- Those distinguished by the name of the including municipality:
  - Log v Bohinju, in Bohinj
  - Log, Kranjska Gora
  - Log, Lukovica
  - Log, Mokronog-Trebelno
  - Log, Rogatec
  - Log, Ruše
  - Log, Sevnica
  - Log nad Škofjo Loko, in Škofja Loka
- Those distinguished other than by the name of the including municipality:
  - Log pod Mangartom (in Bovec)
  - Log pri Brezovici (in Log–Dragomer)
  - Log pri Mlinšah (in Zagorje ob Savi)
  - Log pri Polhovem Gradcu (in Dobrova–Polhov Gradec)
  - Log pri Vrhovem (in Radeče)
  - Log pri Žužemberku (in Trebnje)
  - Log (in Škofja Loka) (known since 1951 as Na Logu)
