= Log =

Log most often refers to:

- Trunk (botany), the stem and main wooden axis of a tree, called logs when cut
  - Logging, cutting down trees for logs
  - Firewood, logs used for fuel
  - Lumber or timber, converted from wood logs
- Logarithm, in mathematics

Log, LOG or LoG may also refer to:

== Arts, entertainment and media ==
- Log (magazine), an architectural magazine
- The Log, a boating and fishing newspaper published by the Duncan McIntosh Company
- Lamb of God (band) or LoG, an American metal band
- The Log, an electric guitar by Les Paul
- Log, a fictional product in The Ren and Stimpy Show
- The League of Gentlemen or LoG, a British comedy show.

== Places ==
- Log, Russia, the name of several places
- Log, Slovenia, the name of several places

== Science and mathematics ==
- Logarithm, a mathematical function
- Log file, a computer file in which events are recorded
- Laplacian of Gaussian or LoG, an algorithm used in digital image processing

== Other uses ==
- Logbook, or log, a record of important events in the operation of a ship
- Chip log, or log, a tool used to estimate vessel speed
- Log (unit), unit of volume in the Bible and Jewish law
- Log profile, shooting profile on some digital video cameras

== See also ==
- Log house
