= Flint axe =

Type of flint tool

A flint axe was a Flint tool used during prehistoric times to perform a variety of tasks. These were at first just a cut piece of flint stone used as a hand axe but later wooden handles were attached to these axe heads. The stone exhibits a glass-like fracture similar to obsidian, and can be knapped to form large blades. The offcuts were sharp enough to be used as small flint knives, while the larger parts of a knapped nodule could be polished to form an axe-head. They competed with other hard rocks such as greenstone, which were produced at Langdale in the British Lake District and got larger as working continued. They tend to be larger and heavier than the simple axes, and are sometimes known as axe-hammers.

There are many different types of flint axes. A specific one that appeared during the Early Stone Age was the core axe. This is an unpolished flint axe that is roughly hewn. The cutting edge is usually the widest part and has a pointed butt. Flake axes are created from the chips from the core axe.

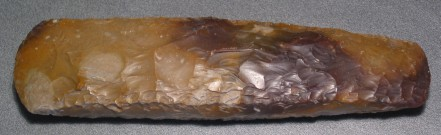
Late Stone Age flint axe, about 31 cm long

Flint axes helped people cut trees, which would help make fire.

== Applications ==
During the prehistoric times, the flint axe was a widely used tool for multiple different tasks. They were widely used during the Neolithic period to clear forests for early farming. The polished axes were used directly to cut timber across the grain, but some types (known as a Splitting maul) were designed to split wood along the grain. The axe was also used to prepare different parts of the animals they killed. They would butcher the meat and prepare the skins. They could also use them to dig up different things when needed. The flint axes were an everyday tool to use for some settlement sites. Some sites used them more for farming and some sites used them more for chopping down trees.

When needed, flint axes were used as a weapon. At a burial site associated with the Globular Amphora Culture, there are 15 individual remains with similar injuries. Using forensic medical analyses to determine these injuries, it was determined that majority of the fractures came from a flint axe. Flint axes are normally found within the graves sites of this particular culture. It was undetermined if this was an invasion or if they used the flint axes as a ritual for the Neolithic community.

== Occurrence ==
Flint nodules are commonly found in Cretaceous chalk deposits, such as those of southern Britain and northern France. They were mined during the Neolithic period in many locations, one of the most famous being at Grimes Graves in Norfolk, England. In Nagada, an Upper Egypt Predynastic settlement site, the Flint axe was one of the most commonly bi-facial tools located there. Flint axes have been discovered along the Nile Valley from Matmar to El Qara. These axes have also been located in Kharga Oasis.
