= Log, Vladimir Oblast =

Log Лог
- Village
- Location within Vladimir Oblast Location within Russia
- Coordinates: 56°13′N 42°18′E
- Country: Russia
- Region: Vladimir Oblast
- District: Vyaznikovsky District
- Time zone: UTC+3:00

Log (Russian: Лог) is a rural locality (a village) in Gorod Vyazniki, Vyaznikovsky District, Vladimir Oblast, Russia. The population was 21 as of 2020.

== Geography ==
Log is located 11 km east of Vyazniki (the district's administrative centre) by road. Rudelyovo is the nearest rural locality.
