= Wedge =

Triangular shaped tool

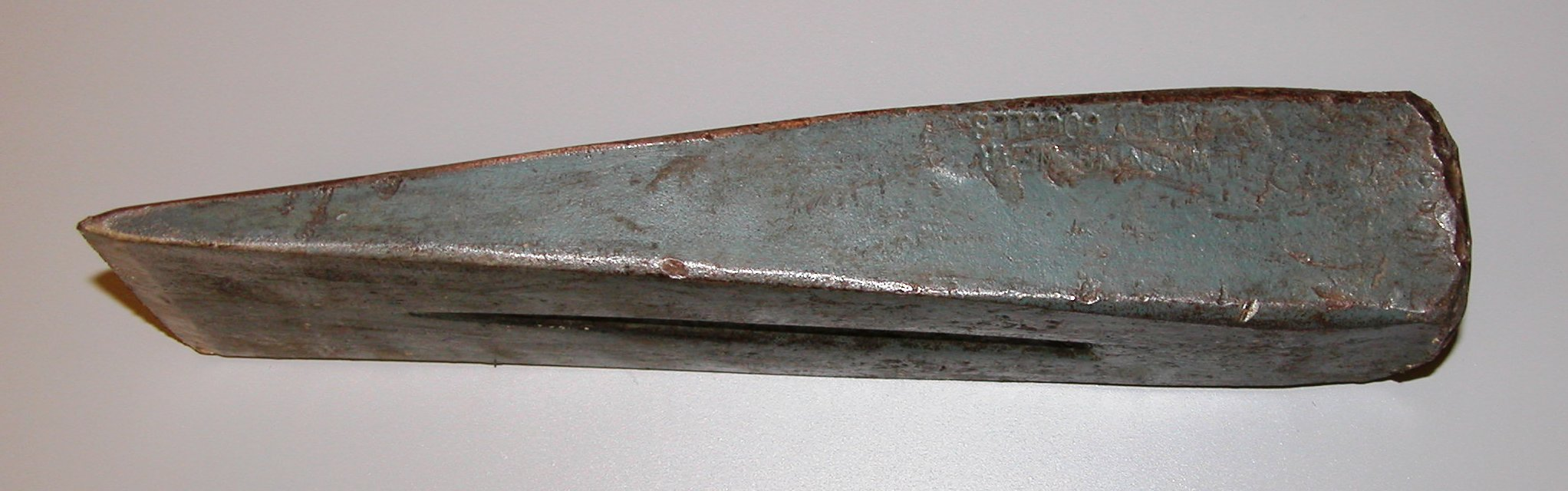
A wood splitting wedge

A wedge is a triangular shaped tool, a portable inclined plane, and one of the six simple machines. It can be used to separate two objects or portions of an object, lift up an object, or hold an object in place. It functions by converting a force applied to its blunt end into forces perpendicular (normal) to its inclined surfaces. The mechanical advantage of a wedge is given by the ratio of the length of its slope to its width.

== History ==
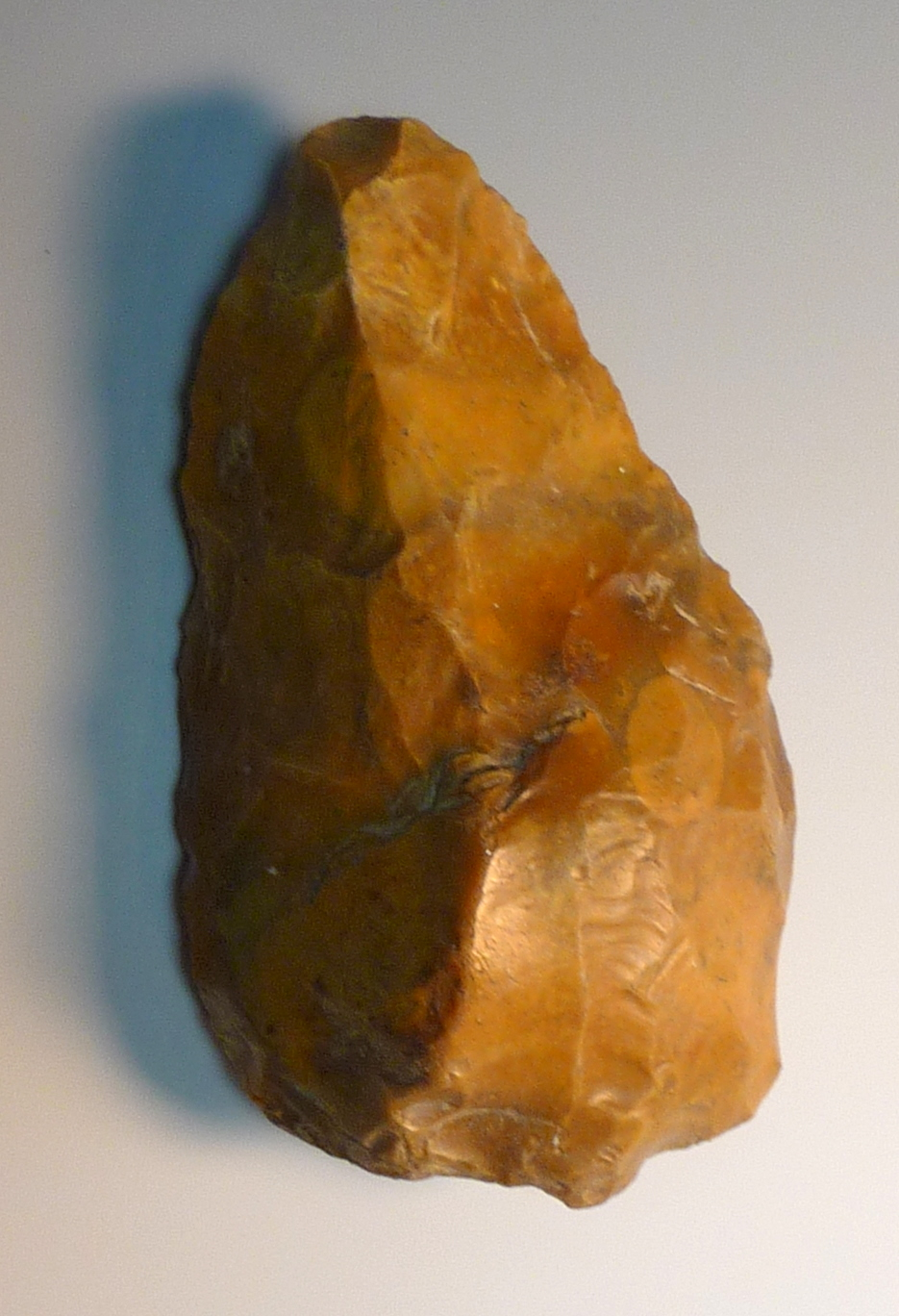
Flint hand axe found in Winchester

Wedges have existed for thousands of years. They were first made of simple stone. Perhaps the first example of a wedge is the hand axe (see also Olorgesailie), which is made by chipping stone, generally flint, to form a bifacial edge, or wedge. A wedge is a simple machine that transforms lateral force and movement of the tool into a transverse splitting force and movement of the workpiece. The available power is limited by the effort of the person using the tool, but because power is the product of force and movement, the wedge amplifies the force by reducing the movement. This amplification, or mechanical advantage is the ratio of the input speed to output speed. For a wedge, this is given by 1/tanα, where α is the tip angle. The faces of a wedge are modeled as straight lines to form a sliding or prismatic joint.

The origin of the wedge is unknown. In ancient Egyptian quarries, bronze wedges were used to break away blocks of stone used in construction. Wooden wedges that swelled after being saturated with water were also used. Some indigenous peoples of the Americas used antler wedges for splitting and working wood to make canoes, dwellings and other objects. The wedge was first used by early humans in different parts of the world, so we don't know where the exact place it came from.

== Uses of a wedge ==
Wedges are used to lift heavy objects, separating them from the surface upon which they rest.

Consider a block that is to be lifted by a wedge. As the wedge slides under the block, the block slides up the sloped side of a wedge. This lifts the weight F_{B} of the block. The horizontal force F_{A} needed to lift the block is obtained by considering the velocity of the wedge v_{A} and the velocity of the block v_{B}. If we assume the wedge does not dissipate or store energy, then the power into the wedge equals the power out.

Or

$$\frac{F_\mathrm{B}}{F_\mathrm{A}} = \frac{v_\mathrm{A}}{v_\mathrm{B}}.$$

The velocity of the block is related to the velocity of the wedge by the slope of the side of the wedge. If the angle of the wedge is α then

$$v_\mathrm{B} = v_\mathrm{A} \tan{\alpha}, \!$$

which means that the mechanical advantage

$MA = \frac{F_\mathrm{B}}{F_\mathrm{A}} = \frac{1}{\tan{\alpha}}.$

Thus, the smaller the angle α the greater the ratio of the lifting force to the applied force on the wedge. This is the mechanical advantage of the wedge. This formula for mechanical advantage applies to cutting edges and splitting operations, as well as to lifting.

Note that since wedge explicitly relies on force of resistance on both sides of the wedge to deliver the force multiplier and achieve an equilibrium, the situations when one of the sides of the wedge is limited in the amount of force of resistance it can deliver is no longer a classical wedge and should be considered separately.

They can also be used to separate objects, such as blocks of cut stone. Splitting mauls and splitting wedges are used to split wood along the grain.

A narrow wedge with a relatively long taper, used to finely adjust the distance between objects is called a gib, and is commonly used in machine tool adjustment.

The tips of forks and nails are also wedges, as they split and separate the material into which they are pushed or driven; the shafts may then hold fast due to friction.

== Blades and wedges ==
The blade is a compound inclined plane, consisting of two inclined planes placed so that the planes meet at one edge. When the edge where the two planes meet is pushed into a solid or fluid substance, it overcomes the resistance of materials to separate by transferring the force exerted against the material into two opposing forces normal to the faces of the blade.

The blade's first known use by humans was the sharp edge of a flint stone that was used to cleave or split animal tissue, e.g. cutting meat. The use of iron or other metals led to the development of knives for those kinds of tasks. The blade of the knife allowed humans to cut meat, fibers, and other plant and animal materials with much less force than it would take to tear them apart by simply pulling with their hands. Other examples are plows, which separate soil particles, scissors which separate fabric, axes which separate wood fibers, and chisels and planes which separate wood.

Wedges, saws and chisels can separate thick and hard materials, such as wood, solid stone and hard metals and they do so with much less force, waste of material, and with more precision, than crushing, which is the application of the same force over a wider area of the material to be separated.

Other examples of wedges are found in drill bits, which produce circular holes in solids. The two edges of a drill bit are sharpened, at opposing angles, into a point and that edge is wound around the shaft of the drill bit. When the drill bit spins on its axis of rotation, the wedges are forced into the material to be separated. The resulting cut in the material is in the direction of rotation of the drill bit, while the helical shape of a bit allows the removal of the cut material.

== Examples for holding objects faster ==
Wedges can also be used to hold objects in place, such as engine parts (poppet valves), bicycle parts (stems and eccentric bottom brackets), and doors. A wedge-type door stop (door wedge) functions largely because of the friction generated between the bottom of the door and the wedge, and the wedge and the floor (or other surface).

== Mechanical advantage ==
Cross-section of a splitting wedge with its length oriented vertically. A downward force produces forces perpendicular to its inclined surfaces.

The mechanical advantage or MA of a wedge can be calculated by dividing the height of the wedge by the wedge's width:

$$\rm MA={Length \over Width}$$

The more acute, or narrow, the angle of a wedge, the greater the ratio of the length of its slope to its width, and thus the more mechanical advantage it will yield.

A wedge will bind when the wedge included angle is less than the arctangent of the coefficient of friction between the wedge and the material. Therefore, in an elastic material such as wood, friction may bind a narrow wedge more easily than a wide one. This is why the head of a splitting maul has a much wider angle than that of an axe.

== See also ==
- Cotter (pin)
- Drawing pin
- Froe
- Log splitter
- Nail (fastener)
- Plug and feather
- Quoin (printing)
- Scalpel
- Sickle
- Wheel chock
