= Log, Voronezh Oblast =

Log Лог
- Selo
- Location within Voronezh Oblast Location within Russia
- Coordinates: 51°34′N 38°22′E
- Country: Russia
- Region: Voronezh Oblast
- District: Nizhnedevitsky District
- Time zone: UTC+3:00

Log (Russian: Лог) is a rural locality (a selo) in Nizhnedevitskoye Rural Settlement, Nizhnedevitsky District, Voronezh Oblast, Russia. The population was 222 as of 2010. There are 4 streets.

== Geography ==
Log is located 4 km north of Nizhnedevitsk (the district's administrative centre) by road. Nizhnedevitsk is the nearest rural locality.
