= Hacking knife =

Heavyweight knife or light hatchet

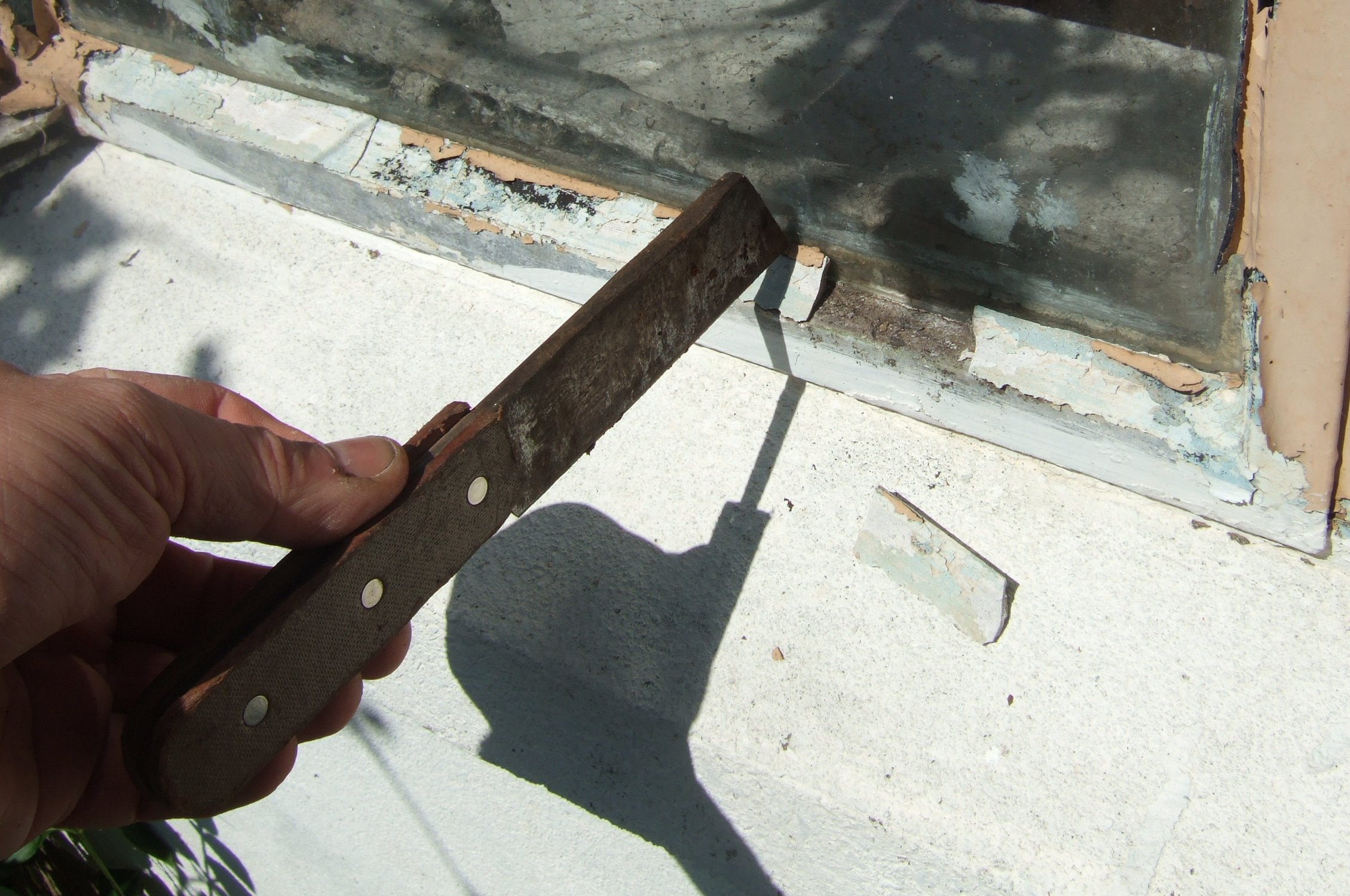
Glazing work, removing old putty before re-glazing

Hacking or side knives are heavyweight knives.

They are strongly constructed with a single-sided straight edge. The back of the blade is exposed for hammering on. This back edge is intended to be hit with a steel hammer, not a wooden mallet or club. The handle is a solid steel through tang, with side scales. The scales are often of thick leather, to absorb shocks.

Their typical uses are either for glazier's work, or else as a light froe for splitting timber.

== Glazing ==
The hacking knife is used to chop out old putty before replacing glass panes. The cut is always made into the side of the frame, parallel to the surface of the glass, so as to avoid striking the glass and probably cracking it. Old putty is brittle and easily breaks out into small pieces. The hacking knife is strong enough to cut through any hidden glazing sprigs (small nails) that are hidden beneath the putty.

== Splitting timber ==
The side knife may be used as a light froe, for splitting small billets of wood. It is driven through the billet using a hammer. Unlike a froe's extended handle, the side knife does not permit twisting to lever the split open and so it must be driven through all the way.

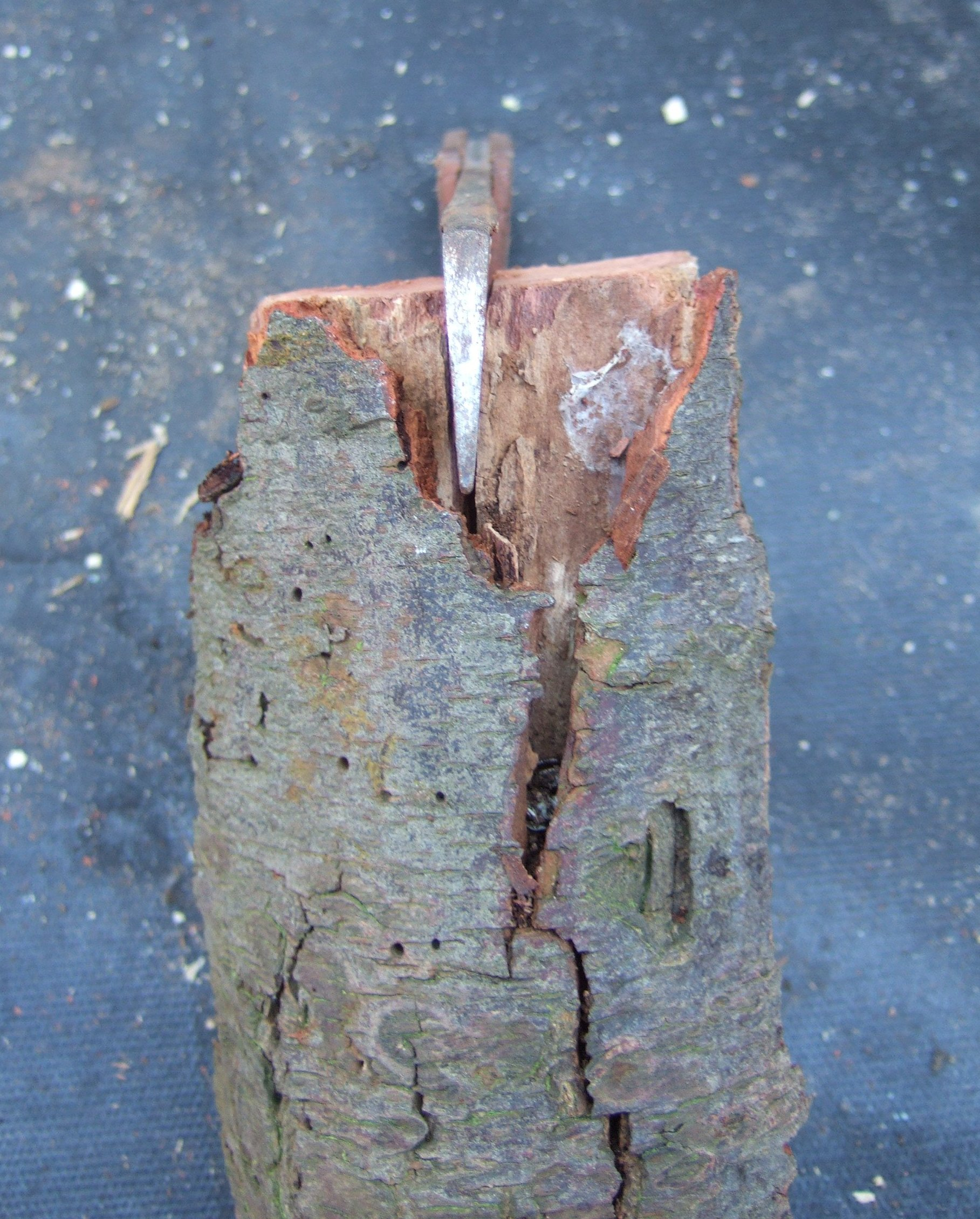
Beginning the split

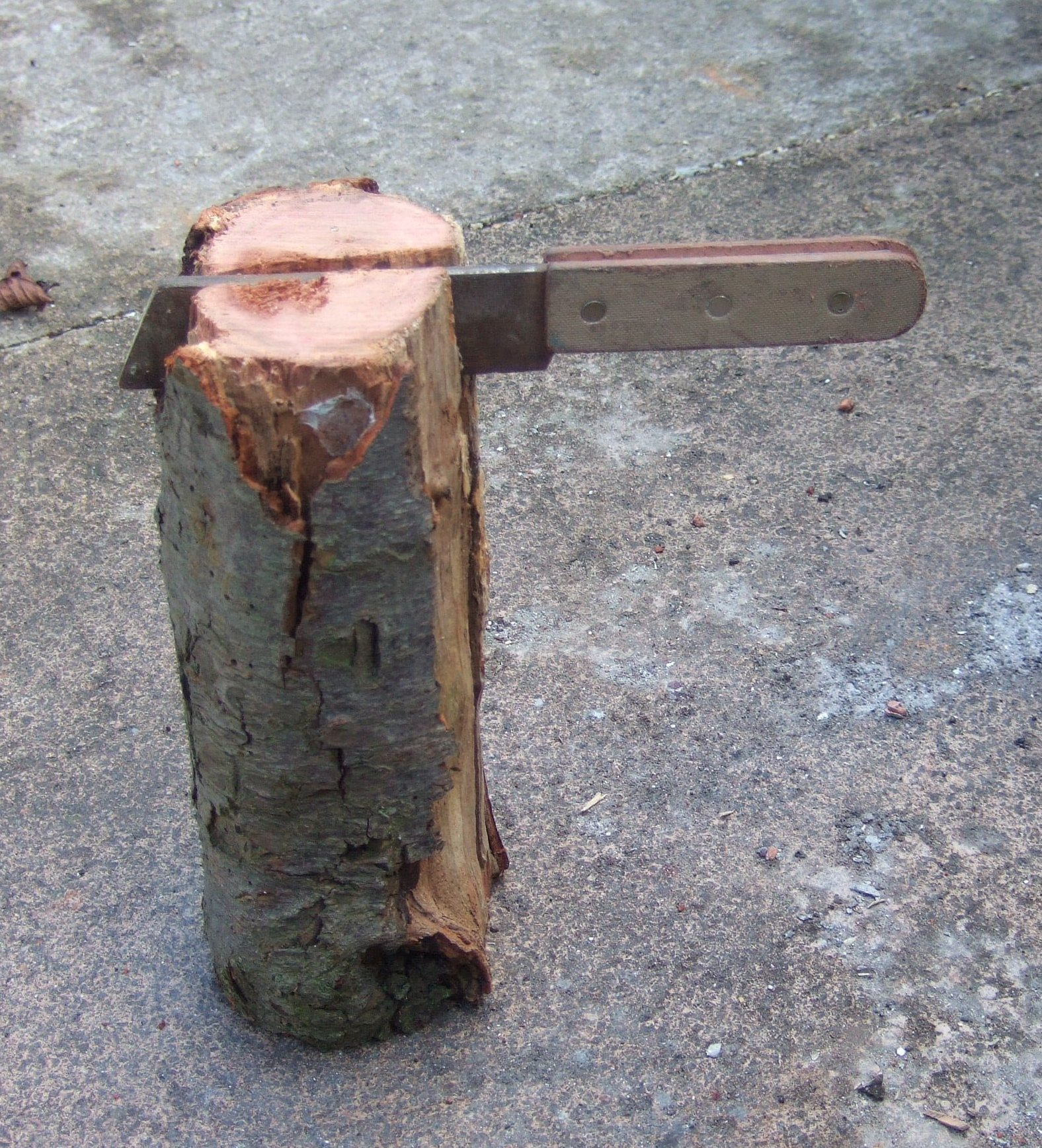
Cleaving with the side knife

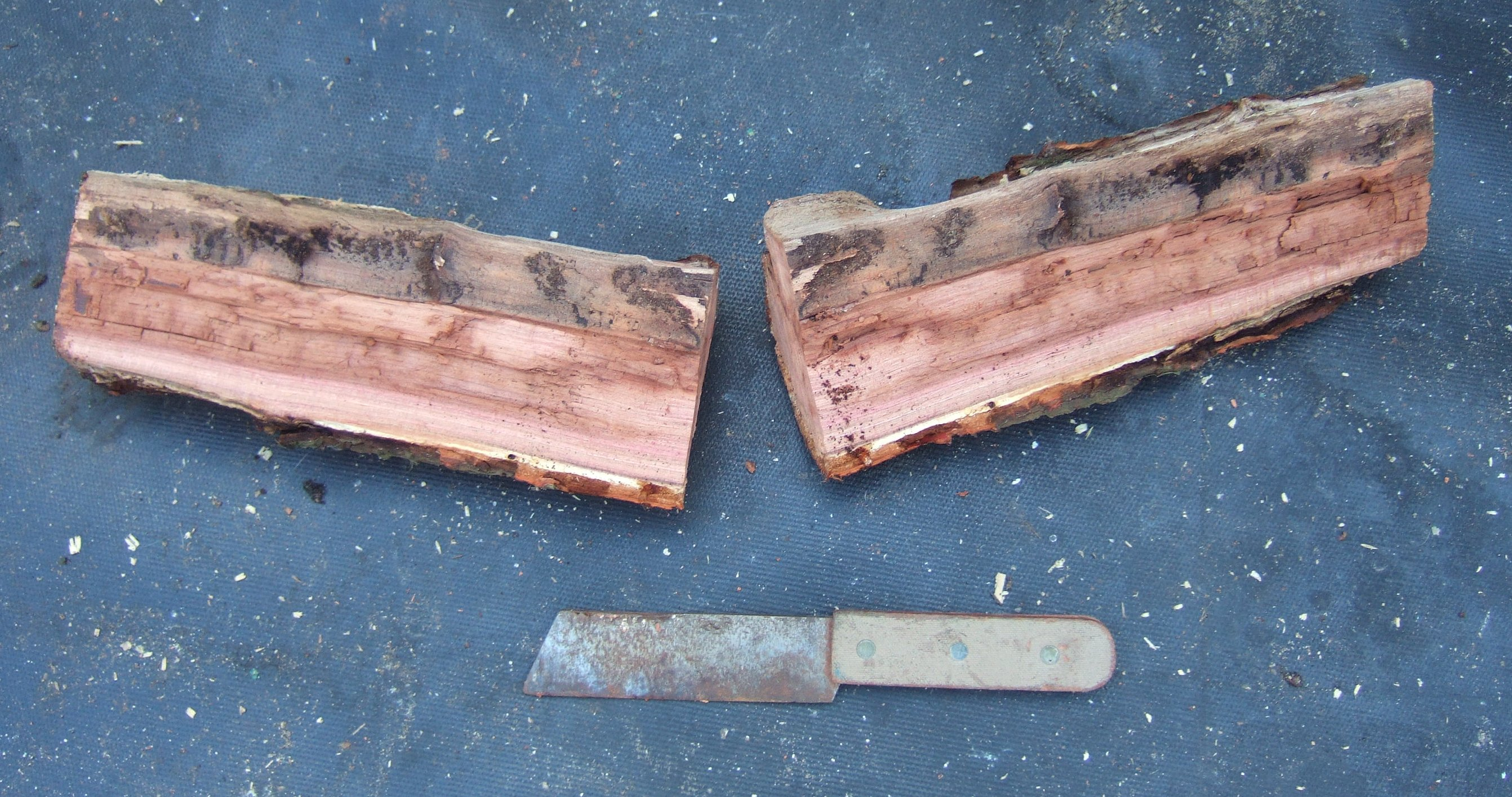
Cleaving complete, with a split billet
