= Rudelyovo =

Rudelyovo Руделёво
- Village
- Location within Vladimir Oblast Location within Russia
- Coordinates: 56°13′N 42°18′E
- Country: Russia
- Region: Vladimir Oblast
- District: Vyaznikovsky District
- Time zone: UTC+3:00

Rudelyovo (Russian: Руделёво) is a rural locality (a village) in Gorod Vyazniki, Vyaznikovsky District, Vladimir Oblast, Russia. The population was 18 as of 2010.

== Geography ==
Rudelyovo is located 11 km east of Vyazniki (the district's administrative centre) by road. Log is the nearest rural locality.
