= Log, Vologda Oblast =

Log Лог
- Village
- Location within Vologda Oblast Location within Russia
- Coordinates: 59°29′N 37°01′E
- Country: Russia
- Region: Vologda Oblast
- District: Kaduysky District
- Time zone: UTC+3:00

Log (Russian: Лог) is a rural locality (a village) in Nikolskoye Rural Settlement, Kaduysky District, Vologda Oblast, Russia. The population was 11 as of 2002.

== Geography ==
Log is located 43 km north of Kaduy (the district's administrative centre) by road. Seninskaya is the nearest rural locality.
