= Log pri Žužemberku =

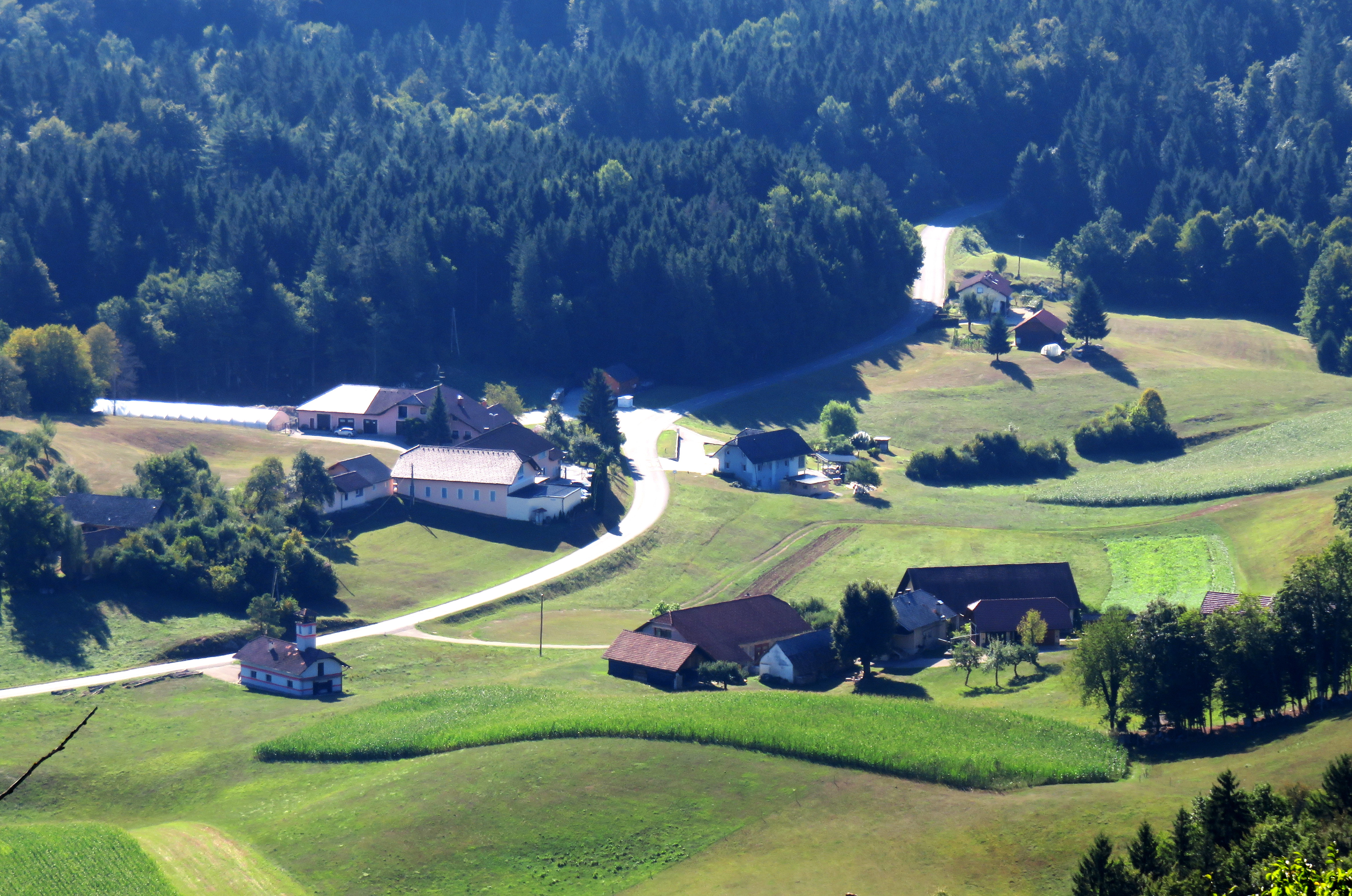

- Location in Slovenia
- Coordinates: 45°53′1.36″N 14°54′36.69″E
- Country: Slovenia
- Traditional region: Lower Carniola
- Statistical region: Southeast Slovenia
- Municipality: Trebnje

Area
  - Total: 1.29 km^{2} (0.50 sq mi)
- Elevation: 326.5 m (1,071 ft)

Population (2002)
  - Total: 9

Log pri Žužemberku (pronounced [ˈloːk pɾi ˈʒuːʒɛmbɛɾku]) is a small settlement in the Municipality of Trebnje in eastern Slovenia. It lie in the hills north of Žužemberk on the road to Zagorica. The area is part of the historical region of Lower Carniola. The municipality is now included in the Southeast Slovenia Statistical Region.

== Name ==
The name of the settlement was changed from Log to Log pri Žužemberku in 1953.
