= Log, Volgograd Oblast =

Log Лог
- Selo
- Location within Volgograd Oblast Location within Russia
- Coordinates: 49°28′N 43°51′E
- Country: Russia
- Region: Volgograd Oblast
- District: Ilovlinsky District
- Time zone: UTC+4:00

Log (Russian: Лог) is a rural locality (a selo) and the administrative center of Logovskoye Rural Settlement, Ilovlinsky District, Volgograd Oblast, Russia. The population was 3,748 as of 2010. There are 34 streets.

== Geography ==
Log is located 29 km north of Ilovlya (the district's administrative centre) by road. Ozerki is the nearest rural locality.
