= Splitting maul =

Heavy, long-handled axe for splitting wood

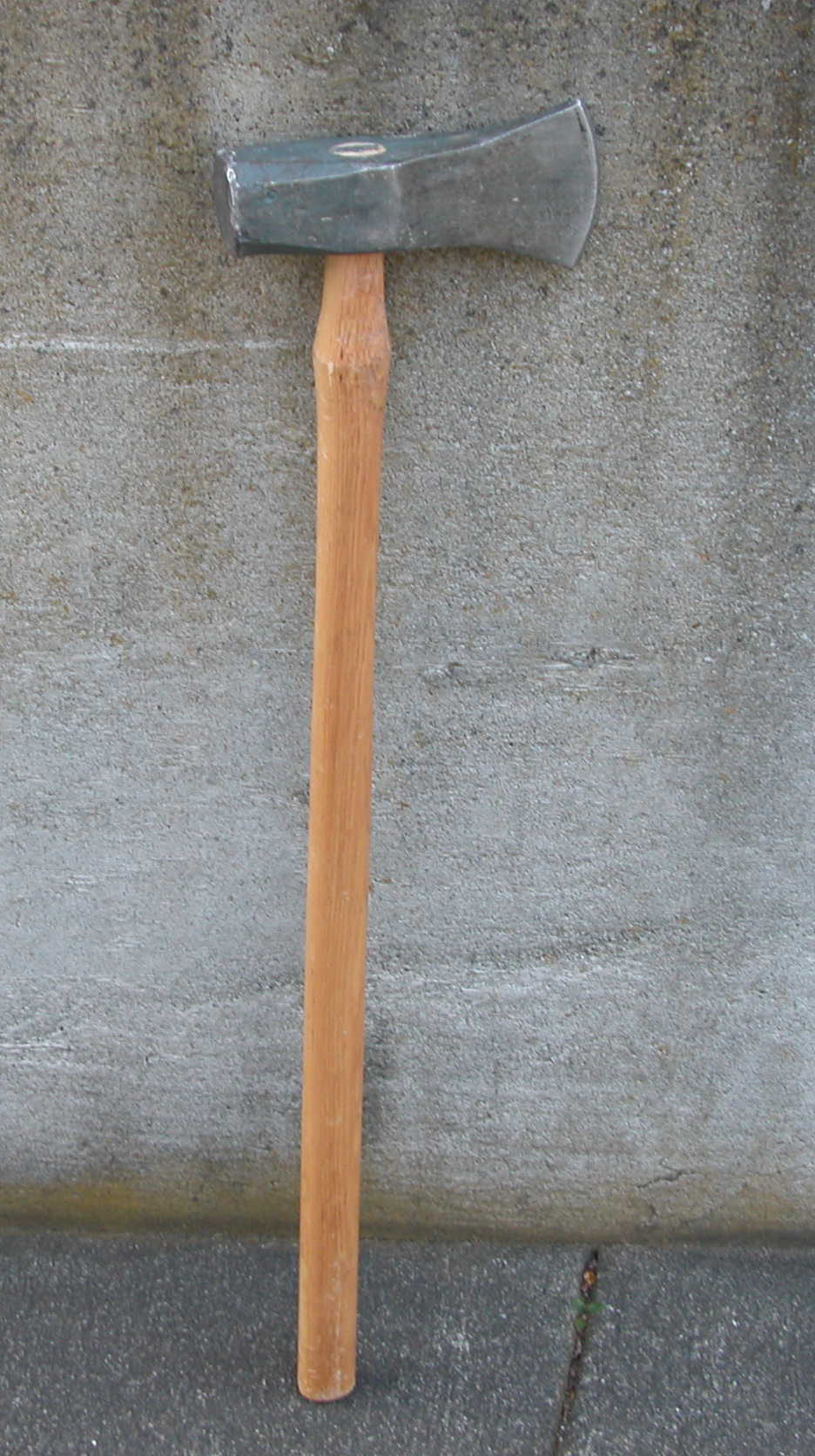
- Wood splitting maul
- Other names: Wood maul Block buster Block splitter Sledge axe Go-devil; Hamaxe
- Classification: Hand tool
- Related: Sledgehammer; Axe; War hammer

A splitting maul also known as a block buster, block splitter, chop and maul, sledge axe, go-devil or hamaxe is a heavy, long-handled axe used for splitting a piece of wood along its grain. One side of its head is like a sledgehammer, and the other side is like an axe.

== Tools ==
Wedged mauls
A typical wood splitting maul has a head mass of 6 to 8 lb, or approximately 2.7 to 3.6 kg. Mauls traditionally have a wedge-shaped head, but some modern versions have conical heads or swiveling sub-wedges. The original maul resembles an axe but with a broader head. For splitting wood, this tool is much better than a typical axe. The weight of it is more advantageous, and it is less likely to become stuck in the wood thanks to its width. The wedge section of a maul head must be slightly convex to avoid jamming and it cannot have the elongated "hollow ground" concave-section that a cutting axe may use. Unlike an axe, maul handles are normally straight and have a more circular cross-section than the elongated oval axe handles tend to be. A maul's handle, unlike an axe, is intentionally used for levering as well as swinging. The handles are typically made from hickory, though synthetic fibreglass handles have become common. Plastic handles are more difficult to break and their factory-attached heads are less likely to work free with the levering action of a maul. In the early 1970s a triangular head design with a reinforced metal handle was introduced called the "Monster Maul".
Separate wedges
Splitting may also be done with a separate wedge and a large hammer. As this allows several wedges to be used together, it permits larger logs to be split. To avoid mushrooming the head of the wedge, they are driven with a heavy wooden mallet rather than an iron hammer. In parts of England the word "maul" denotes this tool with a very heavy wooden head. It is also known as a beetle; there is a well known pub on the River Thames at Moulsford called the Beetle and Wedge.
Powered log splitters
Hydraulic log splitters are commonly used today. They can be used either horizontally or vertically.

== Techniques ==
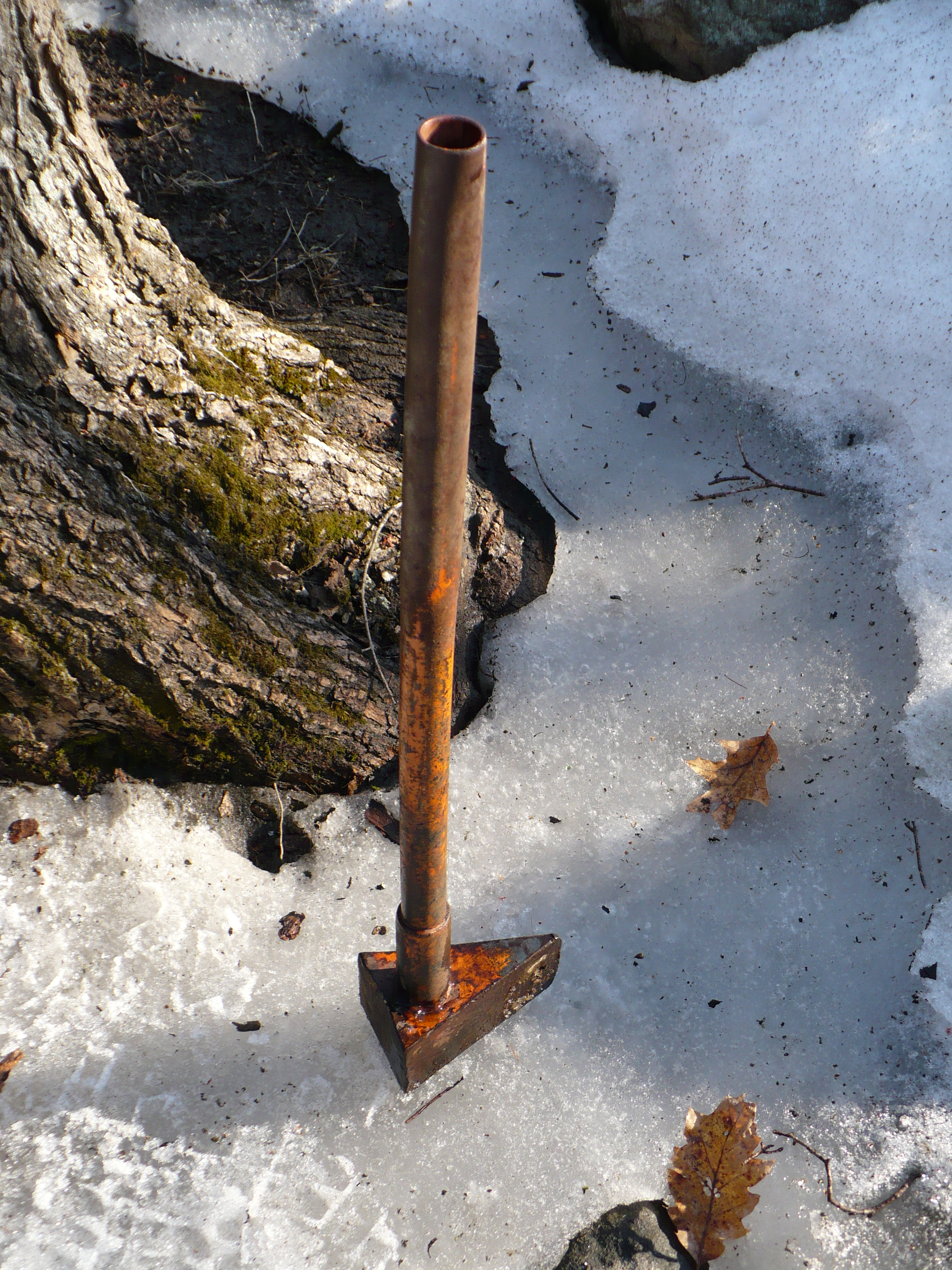
Monster Maul

The maul is most commonly struck onto a flush-cut section of log, usually standing on end atop a splitting stump or other suitable base. Most cut sections can be split in a single downward chop of the maul, splitting the wood apart along its grain. Mauls regularly become stuck in the log for several reasons, such as the wood not being struck with adequate force, the wood containing hidden knots, or the length of wood being too long. Unlike an axe, mauls are effective longer after the edge dulls, as the primary mechanism is that of a wedge pushed through along the wood grain, and not a cross-grain chop of an axe. In some cases, longer logs may be split while they rest length-wise on the base or ground. Mauls often become stuck in logs mid-split requiring a "full-lift" chop to be used. This involves the chopper re-swinging the maul, but this time lifting the half-split log while still attached to the embedded maul, often requiring one or two additional full-lift chops. Another technique for splitting upright logs of thicker diameter is to land the maul's full force off-center of the log, usually removing 1/4 of the mass of the log. When repeated, large logs that would ordinarily cause the maul to be embedded on a center-strike can be handled easily. Additionally, as the temperature gets colder, the fibers in the log become more brittle making the logs easier to split.

== Safety ==
The hammer side of the maul is often used in wood splitting when combined with a splitting wedge, driving the wedge into the wood in the same fashion as the maul itself. This is generally used when attempting to split logs with a large diameter. Modern mauls are made of a strong enough steel to withstand the metal-to-metal contact without chipping. However, it is still common for the wedge itself to chip off. This can be dangerous as flying chips of steel could damage the eye. This is also the easiest way to break a maul's handle because the wedge is a very small target as opposed to the whole log, and can be overshot, resulting in the handle hitting full-force onto the wedge. This greatly weakens the handle, and can cause it to break after only a few over-shots.

Harder seasoned logs which have dried sufficiently often split apart with enough speed that the halves may be a hazard for people or objects nearby.

A common danger for inexperienced splitters is to miss the upright log entirely or give it only a glancing blow. If the maul lands beyond the log, the maul handle may either bounce or break. If the maul lands in front of the log, it may hit the feet of the splitter if they are in a closed stance. If the maul hits the side of the log without biting in, the maul commonly will bounce to one side and to the ground. In this situation, even a widened stance may still leave the splitter's feet vulnerable.

When performing the "full-lift" chop described above, the splitter must never raise the maul and log above head height.

Generally speaking, a maul should never swing to the side. Rather it should be powered through the drop, using speed to assist the natural weight of the maul. In addition a suitable splitting base is one of the most important components to splitting wood with a maul. Wood can be split directly on the ground, although this is a disadvantage for a few reasons. For one the ground, if not frozen, will give on each blow, thereby weakening the overall effect of the blow. The second disadvantage is that it can present the log to be split at a low level, forcing the person splitting the wood to bend over during the swing, which causes back fatigue. The best bases are flush-cut segments of hardwood logs, usually about one foot tall. For repeated seasonal use the top open grain may be treated slightly. The diameter of the base should be at least twice that of the wood placed atop it for splitting, and the base should be placed on firm ground.

Another technique to improve safety involves pinning the head of the maul to the handle. Repeated use can loosen the head, and if the wedge or expander fails, the head will fly from the handle. Placing a pin involves drilling a small diameter hole through the side of the maul, into and through the handle, and usually out the other side. A small, flush, or counter-sunk pin of aluminum or similar material should be placed through the head and secured. It is critical that the pin not protrude from the side of the maul head.

== See also ==
- Firewood
- Froe
- Log splitter
- Stone axe
