= Log splitter =

Equipment for splitting logs for firewood

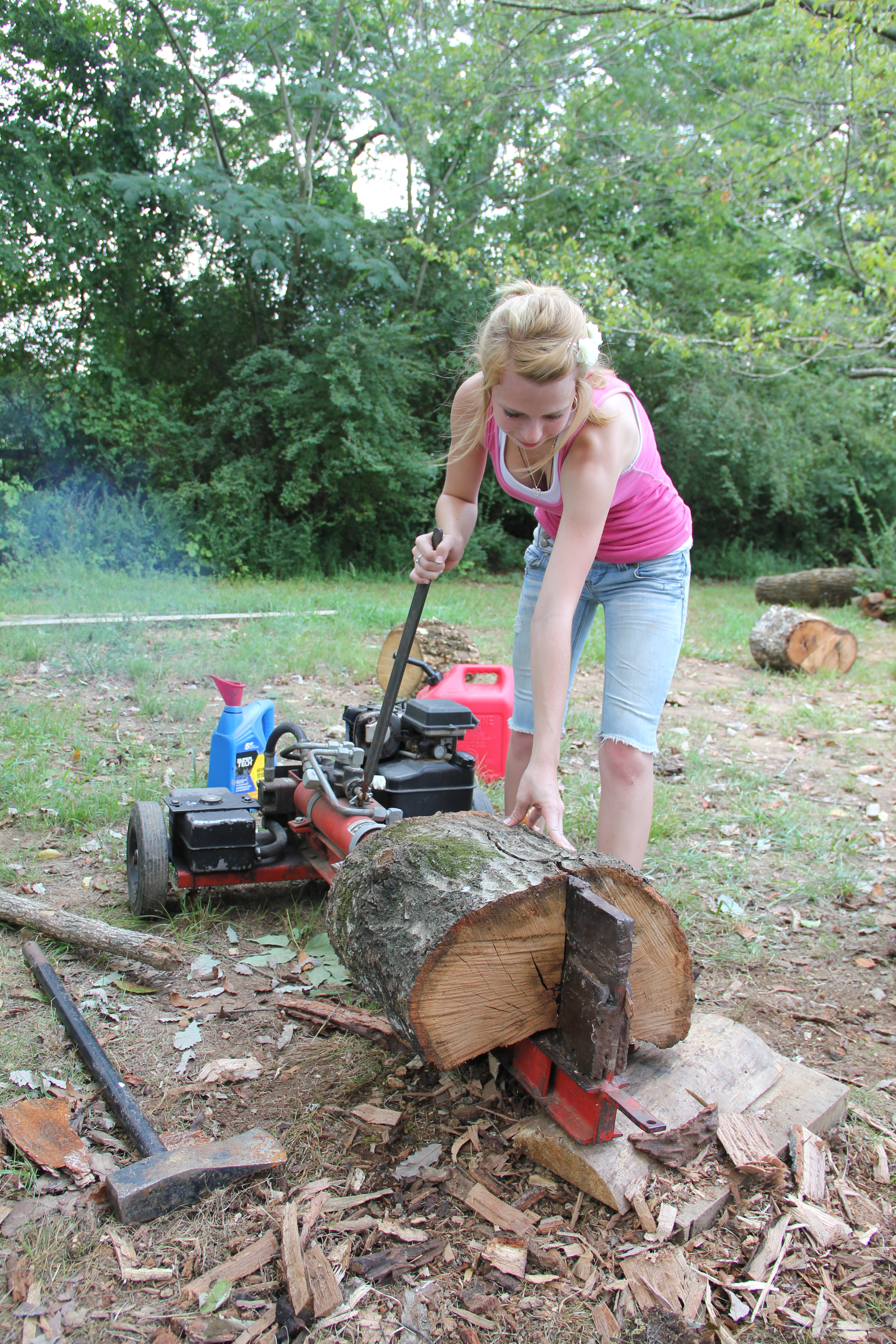
A woman using a gasoline-powered log splitter to split firewood.

A log splitter is a piece of machinery or equipment used for splitting firewood from softwood or hardwood logs that have been pre-cut into sections (rounds), usually by chainsaw or on a saw bench. Many log splitters consist of a hydraulic pump or electric motor which then powers a hydraulic or electrical rod and piston assembly. Generally, these are often rated by the tons of force they can generate. The higher the force rating, the greater the thickness or length of the rounds that can be split. The log splitter consists of all four major hydraulic components.

Most log splitter models for home use have a rating of around 10 tons, but professional hydraulic models may exert 30 tons of force or more. There are also manual log splitters, which use mechanical leverage to force logs through a sharpened blade assembly; and screw or 'corkscrew' types that are driven directly from an agricultural tractor's power take-off shaft where the splitter is mounted on the three-point hitch.

== Power source ==
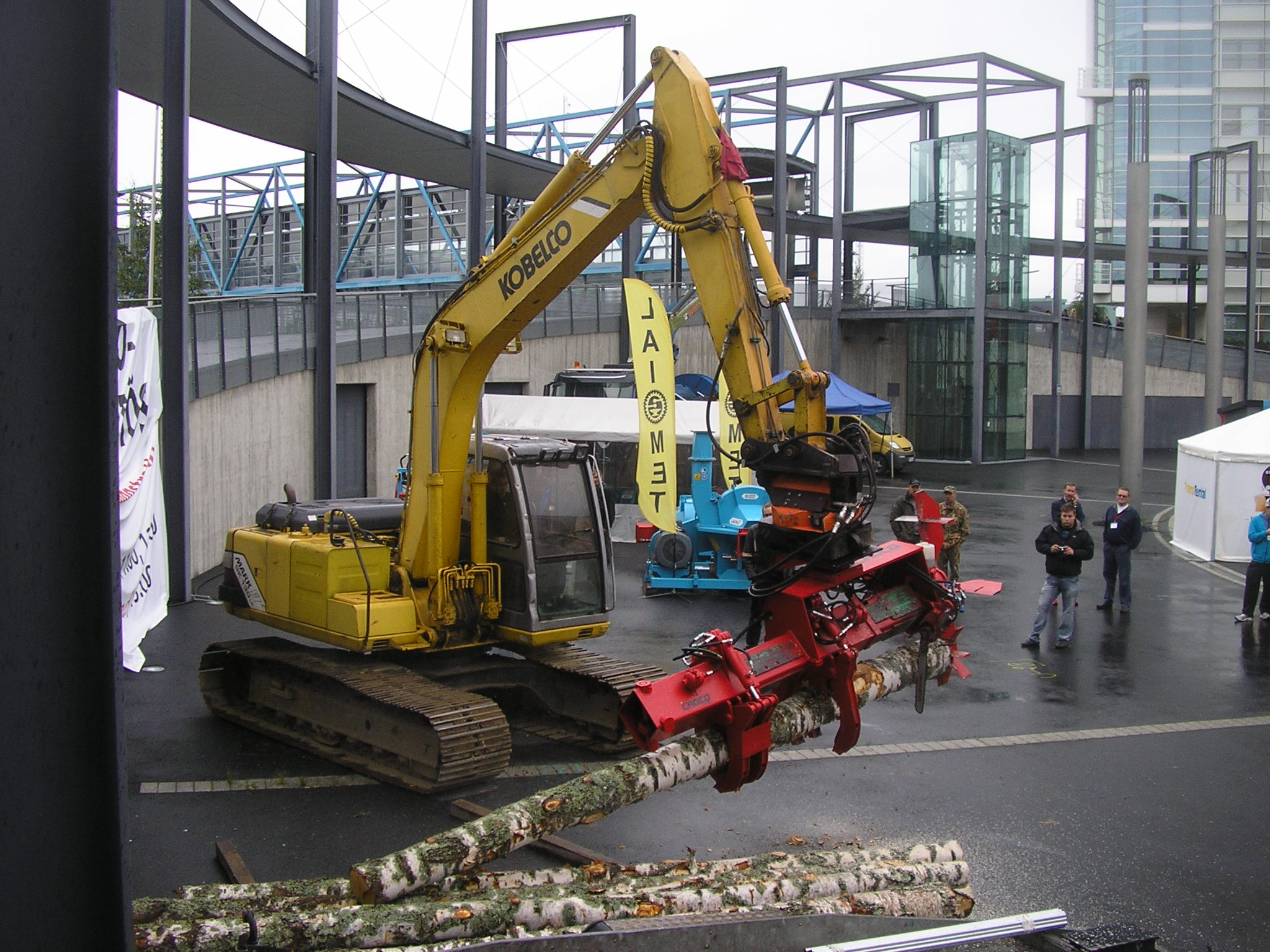
A Croco log splitter attached to a Kobelco excavator in Jyväskylä, Finland.

A simple log splitter may be powered by an electric motor driving a hydraulic pump or by gasoline or diesel engine with or without a tractor. The non-electric versions can be used remotely where the splitter can be moved to the location of the cut wood source. Split logs can then be loaded into trucks, trailers or bulk bags.

No matter what the power source, a log splitter either uses a hydraulic piston to drive the log through a stationary blade or a rotating cone-shaped screw mandrel that pulls the log up over a wedge. Some models have attachments that prevent the split logs from falling to the ground allowing the operator to reposition the logs quickly for a second pass on the log splitter. Some cone or screw splitters are mounted on steel platforms mounted on a three-point hitch that allow the log to be repeatedly split into smaller pieces without putting the wood down and up again.

== Uses ==
Although smaller firewood splitters are intended for homes, there are now many commercial units available. Some commercial splitters are part of a 'firewood processor' that saw logs of timber into lengths, split them, and then carries the wood up an inclined conveyor onto a pile or into a bag, truck, or trailer. Specialty producers such as those producing maple syrup use units that split 4-foot lengths. Machines that split and point wood for fence posts also exist though they are few as it is generally safer and more convenient to see the posts.

The rising cost of domestic heating gas oil has reawakened a desire for alternative fuel sources and burning wood is carbon-neutral. Modern wood-burning stoves are efficient and safe. Many consumers that would not have considered splitting their logs a few years ago are now burning wood fuel for both ecological and economical reasons.

== Safety ==
Video of a vintage steam-powered log splitter in Germany

Although a good log splitter can save the operator hours of labor, it is not possible to make it completely safe. Only trained users should operate a log splitter since anything caught between the log and the splitting blade will be subjected to a force of at least 10 tons, while most modern wood splitters will produce 25 tons or more. Most hydraulic machines now have 'two-handed operation' for safety which means that both of the operator's hands are needed to actuate the splitter thus keeping them out of the way of the moving blade.

The behavior of each log cannot be predicted, so a safety zone should be established around the splitter to prevent injury from flying splinters of wood. Helpers can pick up the individual pieces of firewood, but should not stand near the log splitter while it is in operation.
