= Froe =

Tool for splitting wood

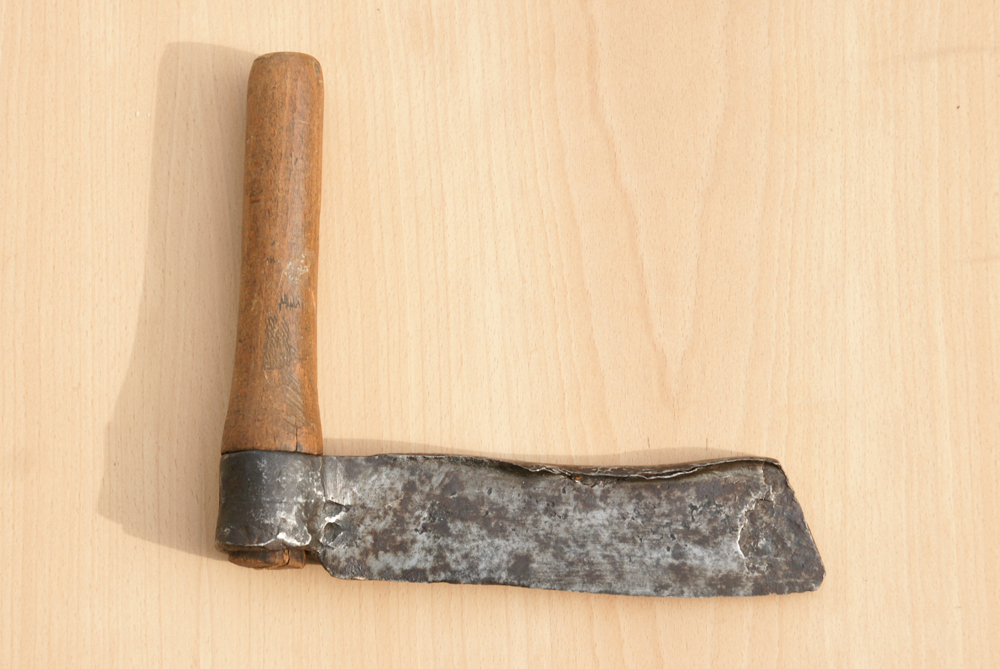
A froe

A froe (or frow), shake axe or paling knife is a tool for splitting wood by cleaving it along the grain. It is an L-shaped tool, used by hammering one edge of its blade into the end of a piece of wood in the direction of the wood grain, then twisting the blade in the wood by rotating the haft (handle).

A froe uses the haft to multiply the force upon the blade, allowing wood to be torn apart with remarkably little force applied to the haft. By twisting one way or the other the direction of the split may be guided.

== Overview ==
Froes are used in combination with mallets to split timber, to make planks, wooden shingles, or kindling. Froes are safer and more accurate to use than hatchets or splitting mauls as they do not require any swinging of their blade.

The origin of the word froe is not clear, and some references find it spelled frow. One possibility of its roots can be found in the Old English word fro, which meant "away" (as in the phrase "to and fro"), which was the direction one hammered the froe to split the wood.

Froes are similar in general form to axes, in that a froe is an L-shaped assembly of a blade head (typically steel) set at a right angle to a handle called a haft (traditionally wood). A froe can be thought of as an axe which is sharpened along the top of a long, narrow, rectangular head, instead of (as the axe is) at the end of a broad curved head. Some froes are made of a single piece of metal with no perpendicular haft. Instead, the handle is the nonbeveled end of the blade which extends directly from the blade. These froes must be hammered through the entire piece of wood, as their lack of vertical haft makes it extremely difficult to lever the wood apart. A given froe can split a piece of wood no wider in its narrowest dimension than the length of the froe's blade; that is, when you place the froe, it must cross the surface of the wood completely.

A froe is also unlike an axe or splitting maul in that it can be placed exactly where the user would like the split to begin. With the exception of users with expert aim, axes and mauls cannot. This technique can be used with enough precision that regularity of measurements can be kept when cutting shingles, ground stakes, or even small rails or planks. Another use is to rive pieces of wood to be used for steam bending, as this wood follows the grain and is less prone to breakage.

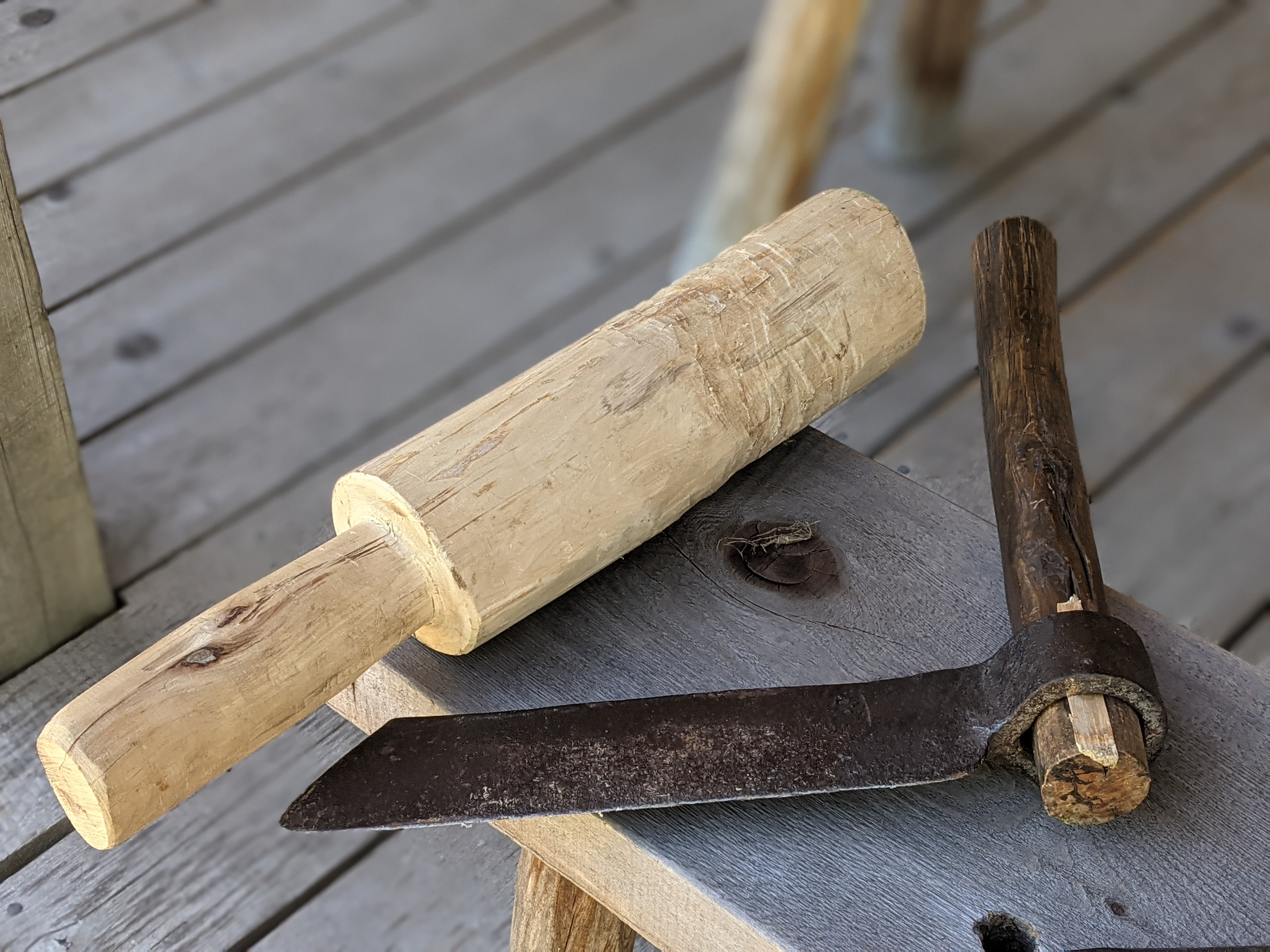
A froe and froe club

Hitting the narrow blade of a froe repeatedly damages a mallet, and so the traditional implement used to hit it is a froe club. This is simply a short length of a thin log, still with the bark on it, with one end reduced with a drawknife to convenient diameter for a handle. It is rotated slightly in the hand with each blow so as to even the wear and, although the club soon wears out, a new one can easily be made.

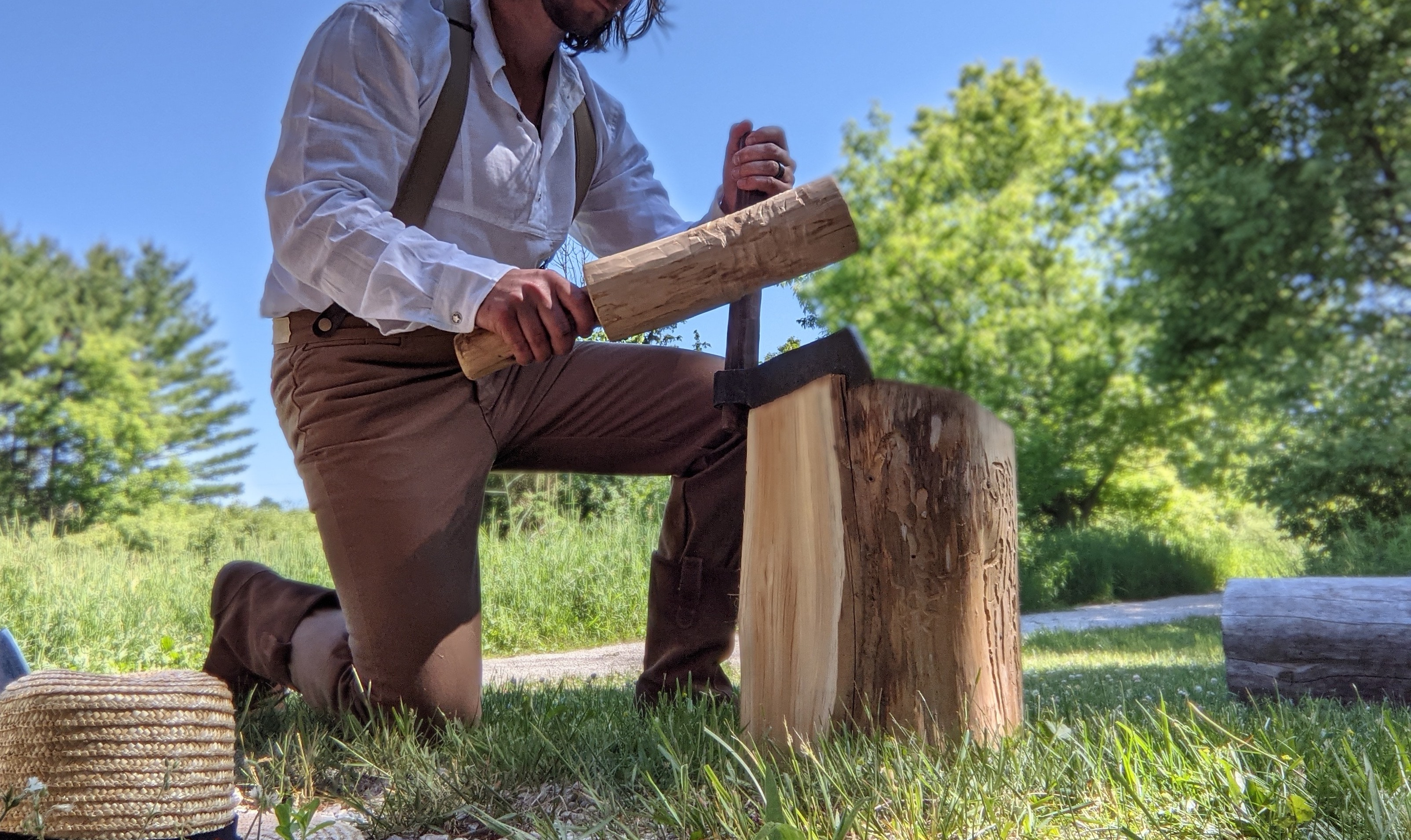
Using a froe to make cedar shakes
