= Stoneywell =

Historic house, gardens and woodland near Coalville, Leicestershire, England

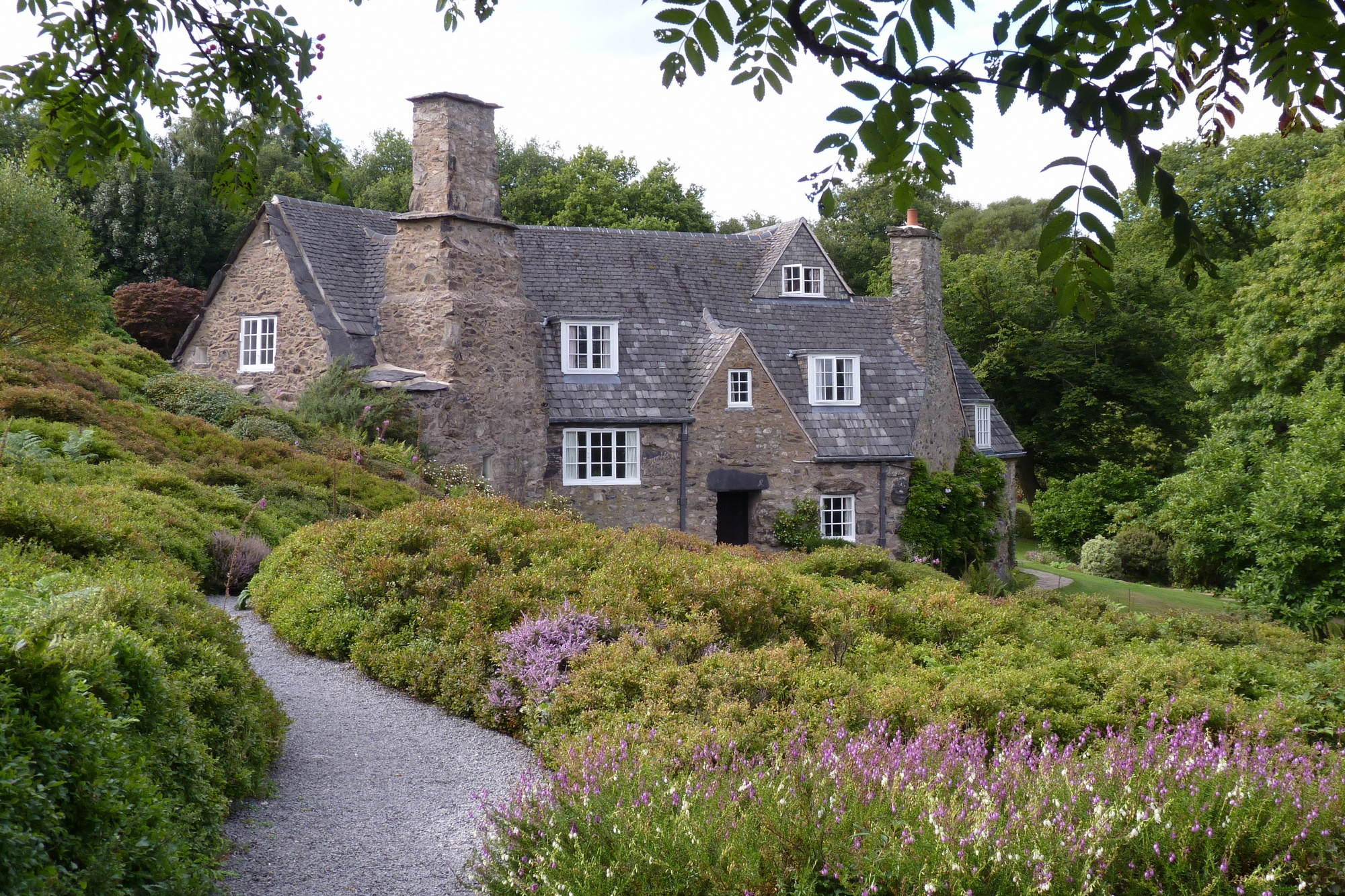

- Location within Leicestershire

General information
- Type: Domestic House
- Architectural style: Arts and Crafts
- Location: SK498118, Ulverscroft, Leicestershire, United Kingdom
- Coordinates: 52.70149°N 1.26465°W
- Construction started: 1898
- Completed: 1899
- Cost: £920
- Client: Sydney Gimson

Design and construction
- Architect: Ernest Gimson

Stoneywell is a National Trust property in Ulverscroft, a dispersed settlement near Coalville in Charnwood Forest, Leicestershire. Stoneywell is the largest of a small group of cottages designed in the Arts and Crafts style by Ernest Gimson. It was built in collaboration with Detmar Blow in 1899 for Ernest's brother Sydney Gimson as a summer residence, and along with much original furniture, it remained in the Gimson family for over a century. As part of a highly influential vernacular movement, it has become well known within Arts and Crafts circles. In spring 2013 the National Trust announced that following a year-long appeal, it had been able to acquire the house with its Arts and Crafts contents, gardens and woodland. It was opened to the public in February 2015.

== House ==
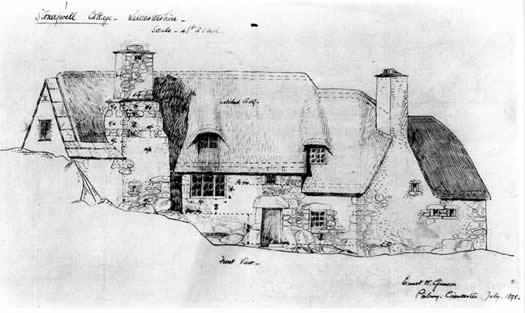
Drawing of Stoneywell by Ernest Gimson, July 1898

Built between 1897 and 1899 out of the stones found in the immediate locality, and constructed directly onto outcrops of exposed Charnwood bedrock, Stoneywell creates the impression it is an organic part of the landscape. Set away from the road, it is close to Stoneywell Wood and its surrounding gardens are by design and necessity more wild than cultivated. The house is built on a slope and approached from above so that a visitor is required to walk round the house to get to the front door, which faces south-west over the rugged landscape. At one end the roof almost reaches the ground, and the massive chimney stack buttresses the south wall. The roof, like many of Gimson's houses, was originally thatch, but following a fire in 1938 was re-roofed in second-hand Swithland slates. The rooms, windows and roofline step downwards, along the open z-shape of the groundplan, to follow the contours of the hill, such that the ground floor is on three levels, and both groundfloor and dormer windows are all at different heights. The fireplace and doorway have huge Swithland slate lintels, that were found nearby at abandoned slate quarries. The stone walls were built from undressed stones, their surfaces being kept even by the careful selection of each stone by the masons, to fit needs of the wall. Many of the stones were re-used from dry stone walls already on the site, or recovered from the boulder clay and outcrops around about. Externally the stone has been left in a natural state, whereas internally both the walls and the exposed timbers are white. These constructional timbers, matching the intricate irregularities of the ground plan, had been cut and prepared by Richard Harrison at Sapperton, Gloucestershire to Ernest Gimson's design, and transported the 150 miles for assembly on site, showing how much pre-planning and design had gone into Gimson's plan. In 1966 it was listed as a Grade II* listed building.

== Furniture ==
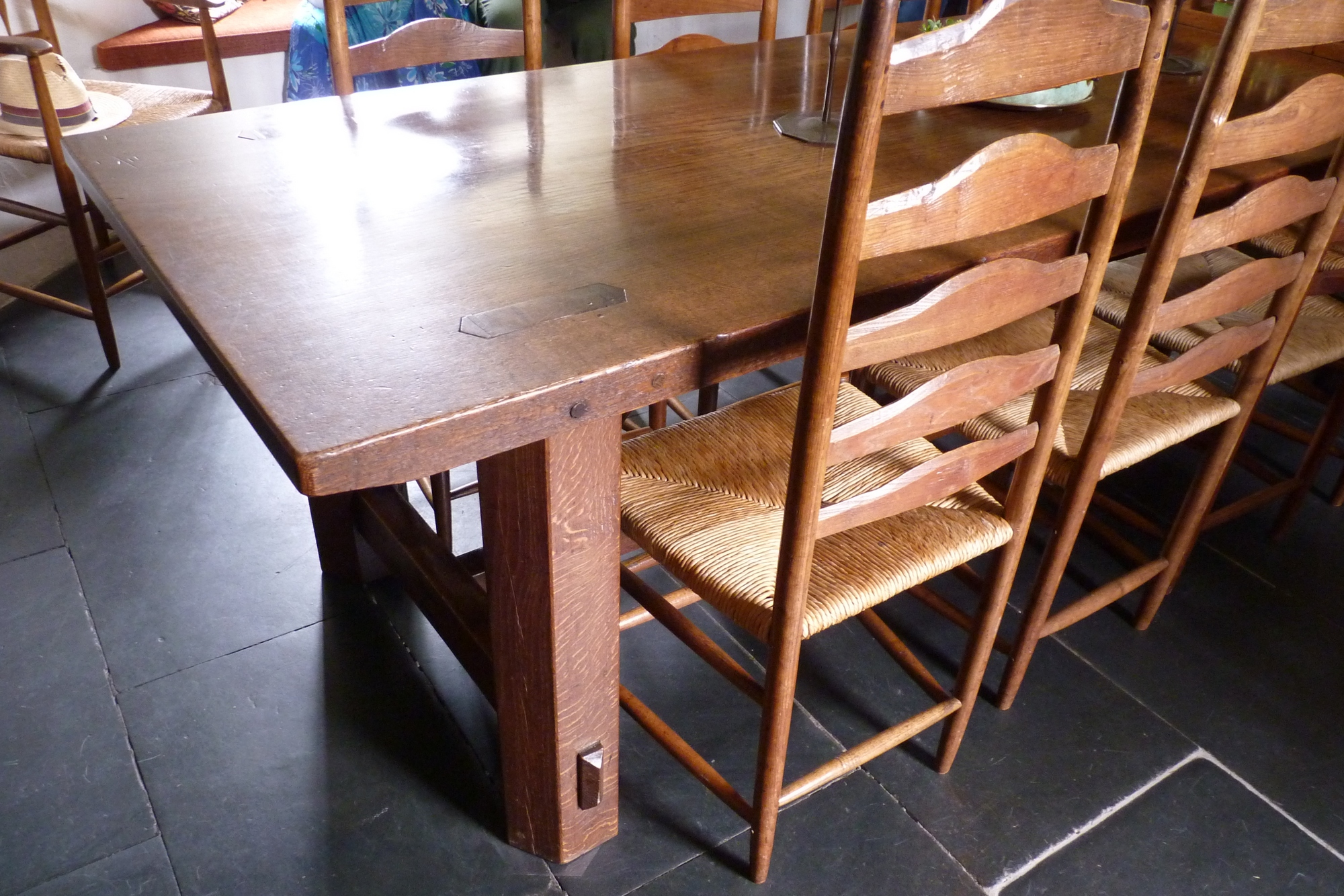
Sidney Barnsley's oak dining table, with Ernest Gimson's ladder-back chairs

Ernest Gimson was born in Leicester in 1864, the son of Josiah Gimson, engineer, founder of Gimson and Company, owner of the Vulcan Works. Having worked as an architect in London during the 1880s, he had moved to the Cotswolds to found an Arts and Crafts community. In 1894 he settled in Pinbury near Sapperton, with Sidney and Ernest Barnsley, principally designing and making wooden furniture, following traditional craft principles, applied to new designs using clean lines and unadorned surfaces. It was from this background that Ernest Gimson applied himself not just to the architectural plans for Stoneywell, but to designing and making the furniture too. Because the house has remained with the Gimson family throughout the 20th century, much of the furniture remains at the house, including Gimson's ladder-back chairs, a large table and dresser by the Barnsleys, and an oak bed made by Gimson.

== Construction ==
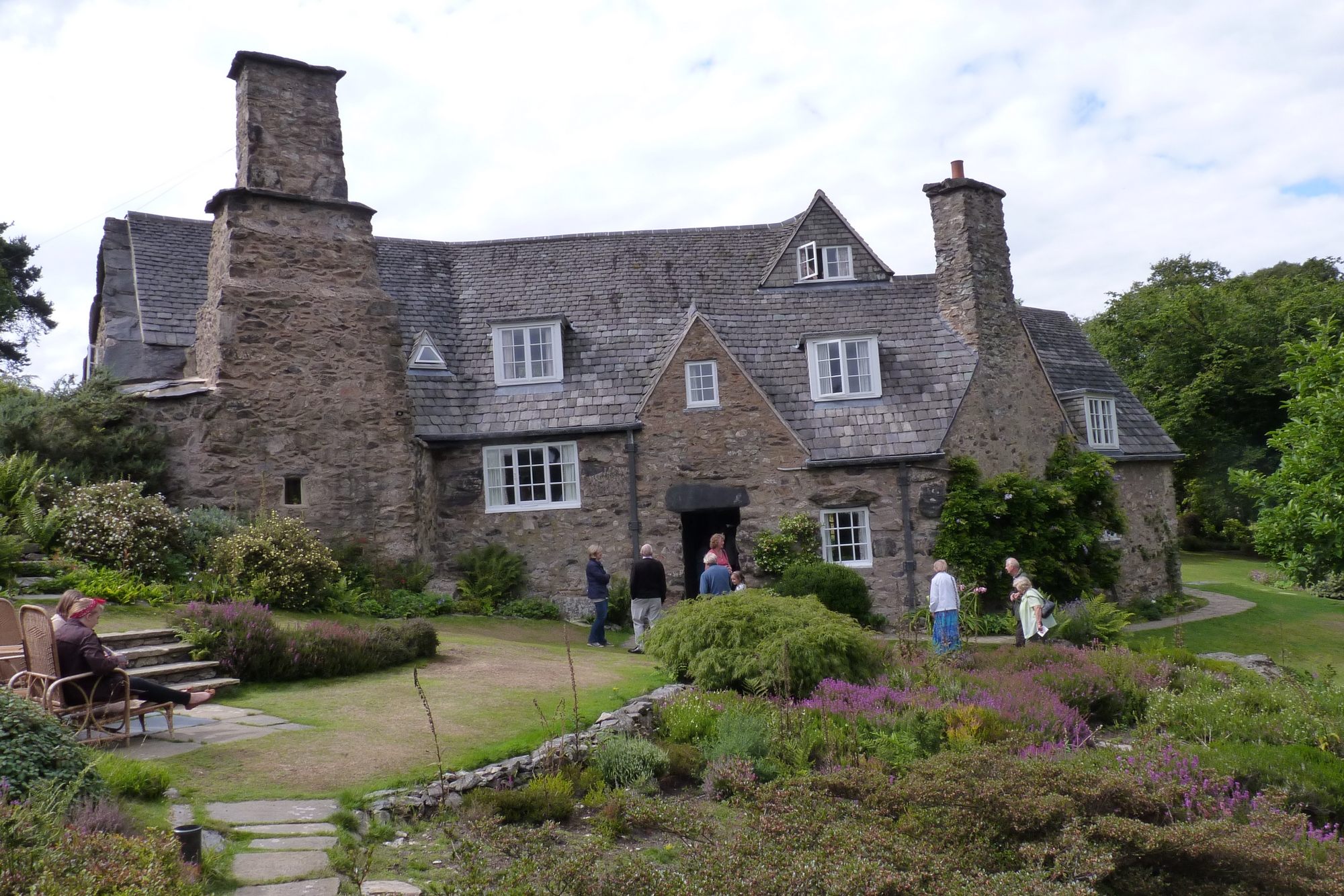
The entrance faces out away from the road, with no vehicular access.

Stoneywell is one of five cottages designed by Ernest Gimson in Ulverscroft. The earliest were a pair of workmen's cottages, built for James Billson in 1897. Rather than employ contractors, Gimson collaborated with a fellow Arts and Crafts architect, Detmar Blow. Following the principle that an architect should be able build what he designs, Blow had begun practical building alongside stonemasons in North Yorkshire. He came to Leicestershire to work on the cottages, and brought several Yorkshire stonemasons, as well as employing three Leicestershire men. The Gimson family were Leicester industrialists, familiar with this corner of Charnwood. They bought three plots of land from James Billson, to build cottages for summer use by Ernest's brothers Sydney and Mentor, and their sister Margaret. Detmar Blow collaborated in the building of two of these, Stoneywell and Lea Cottage. Stoneywell was the most architecturally 'extreme' of these, and remains the least changed. Ernest Gimson had suggested that it could be built for £500, whereas the final bill came in at £920. The cost over-run was not the only frustration experienced by Sydney. At the same time as building the Charnwood houses, Detmar Blow also had commitments to carry out painstaking repairs to Lake House in Wiltshire, followed by St Peter and St Paul's Church, Clare, Suffolk. These used new techniques to preserve the stonework of ancient decayed walls, under the guidance of the Society for the Protection of Ancient Buildings (SPAB), and during 1898 both Sydney Gimson and the SPAB secretary wrote to Blow complaining about the absences from their project, highlighting the problem of such a hands-on approach to architecture. Stoneywell was completed in 1899, the date and a Gimson 'G' being carved in the slate lintel above the front door. It was initially used purely as a summer residence. Humphrey Gimson, as well as re-roofing it after the 1938 fire, carried out limited alterations to make it habitable all year round, and Donald Gimson, from the third generation of the family, continued to live there until 2012.

== National Trust property ==
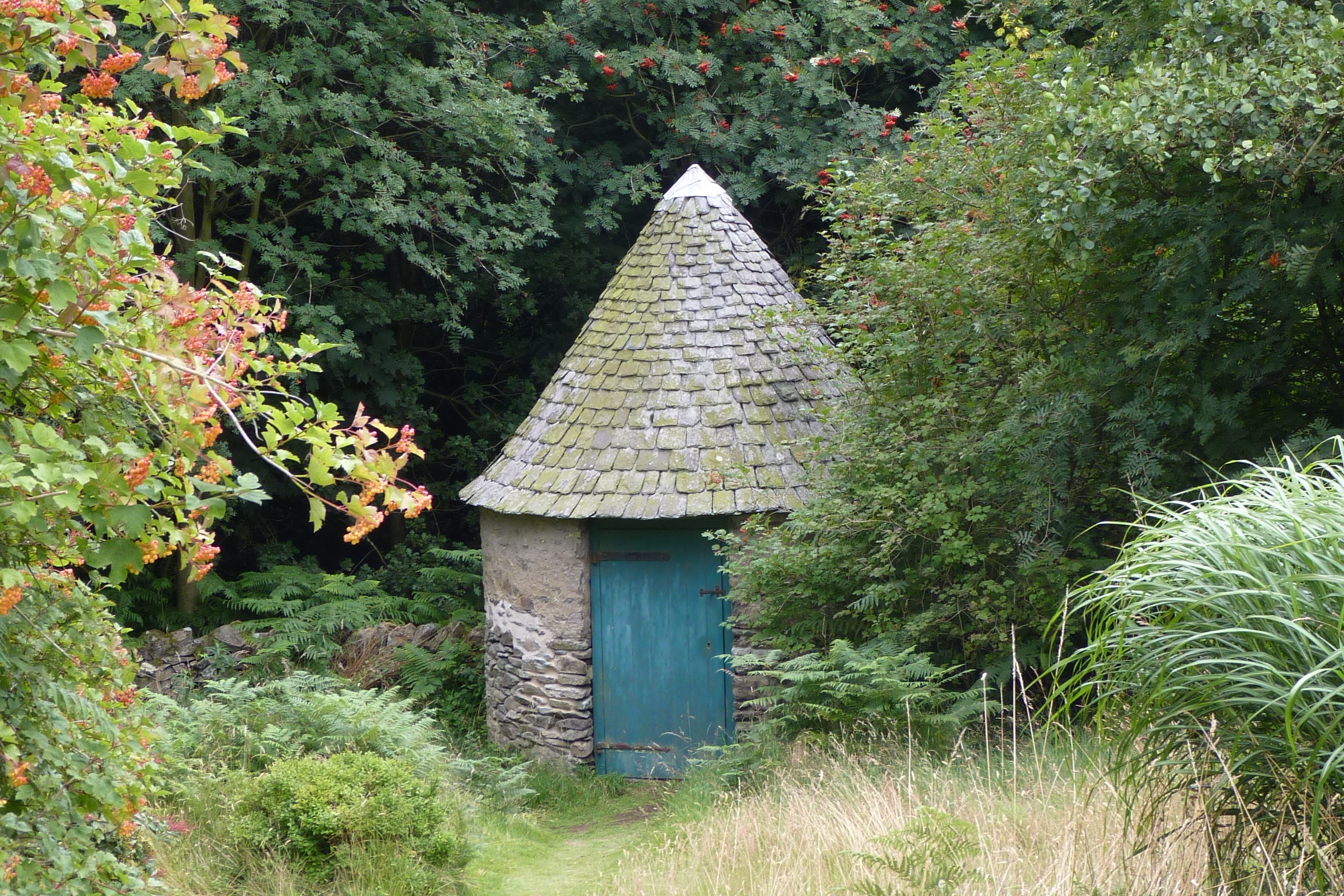
Small slate-roofed well house, built in 1899 beside Stoneywell Wood. Originally all water had to be carried from here to a stone tank in the house.

Following an appeal, and donations from The Monument Trust and the J Paul Getty Jr Trust, the National Trust was able to raise enough money to buy Stoneywell from the Gimson family. The house, gardens and woodland opened to the public in February 2015. There are strict limitations on how many people and cars can visit, so as to minimise impact on the locality; all visits must therefore be booked in advance. A parking area has been created away from the site and visitors are carried on a shuttle bus to a reception centre in the converted stables. The coach house and stable of 1902, also by Ernest Gimson, are separately listed as Grade II as is a small pump house of 1899.

This is the first house in Leicestershire to be in the care of the National Trust. (Their other properties in the county are Staunton Harold Church and Ulverscroft Nature Reserve.)

== Ulverscroft cottages ==
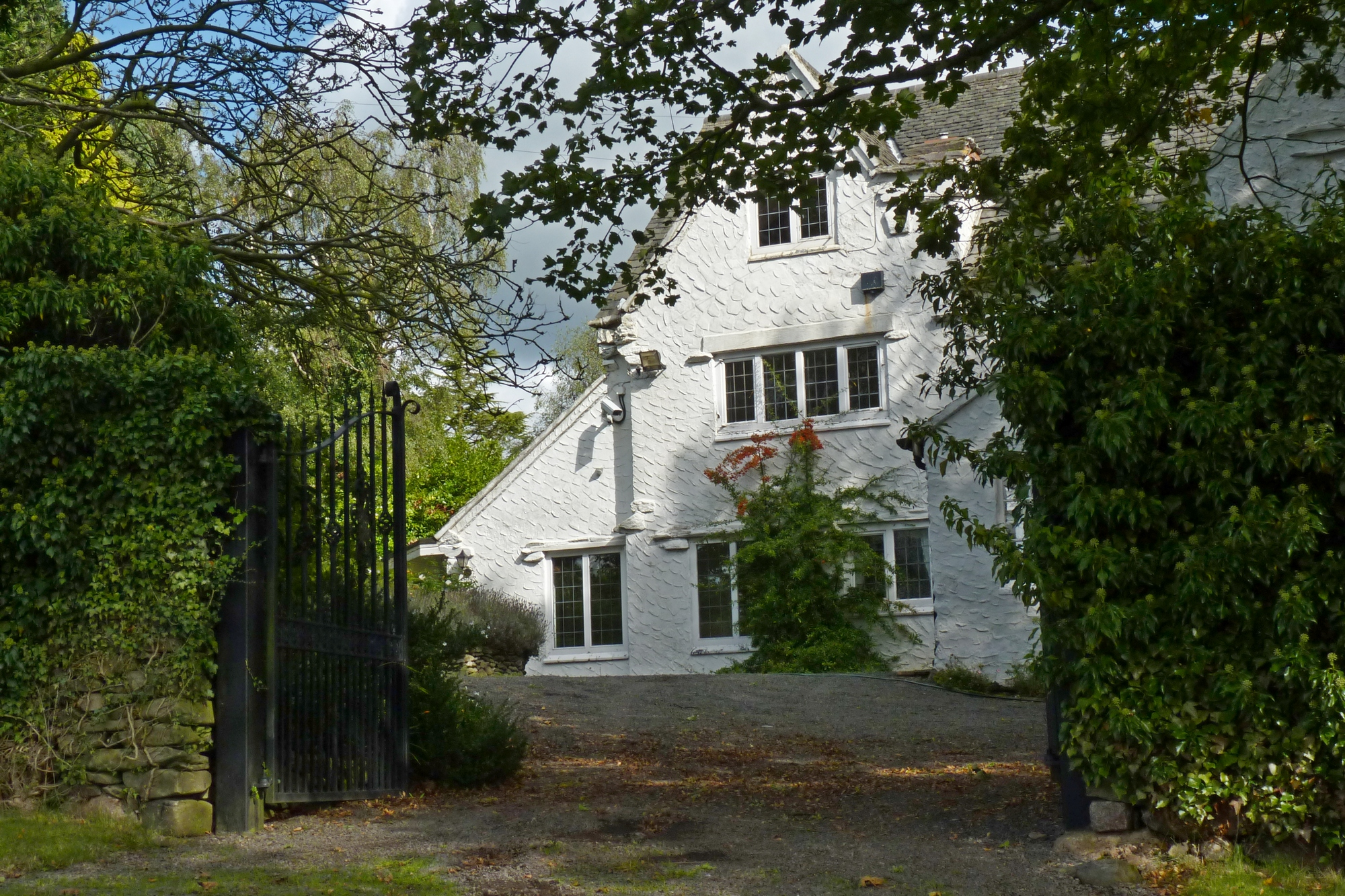
Chitterman House, the now greatly altered pair of workmen's cottages

James Bilson's pair of workmen's cottages are now a single dwelling, Chitterman House,(52.70177°N 1.27002°W, SK4966011796) and altered beyond recognition.

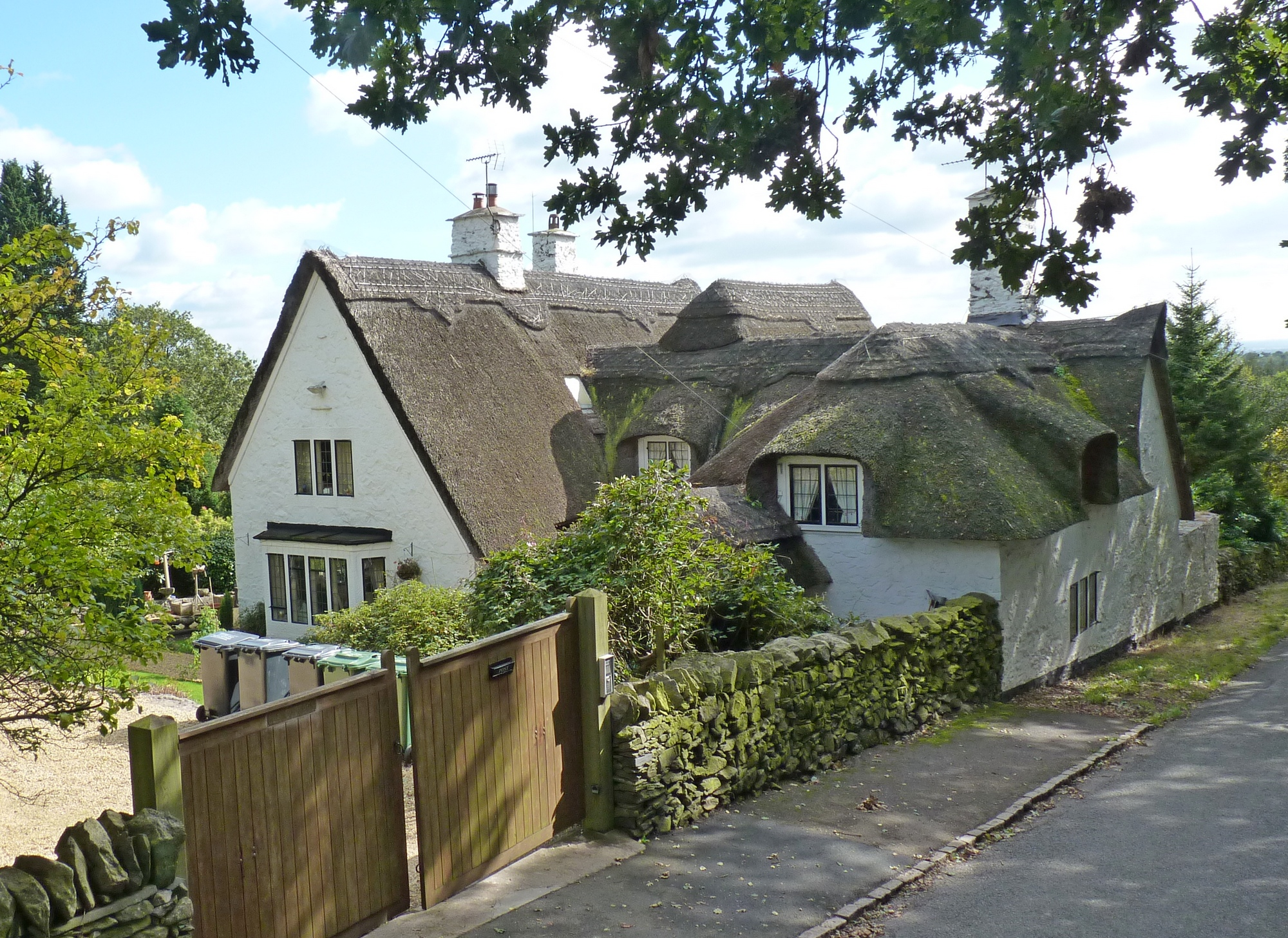
Lea Cottage, Ulverscroft. The wing on the left of the picture was added in 1972

Lea Cottage (52.70157°N 1.26654°W, SK4979511647), a little further down the Lea Lane from Stoneywell and built in tandem with it, sits hard against the road. It was enlarged in 1972 by the addition of a south-west wing. Unlike Stoneywell it is still a thatched building, and remains whitewashed externally, as in Gimson's original design.

Rockyfield Cottage, the last of Gimson's Ulverscroft houses, was built for his sister Margaret nearly ten years later, close by on Priory Lane (52.70022°N 1.26456°W, SK4942411816). The building work for Rockyfield was supervised by Norman Jewson, who was younger than many of the Arts and Crafts circle, and this was one of his first projects away from their Cotswolds base. It was completed in 1908.

Sketches of Stoneywell and Lea Cottage were published by R. A. Briggs in his 1904 book, Homes for the Country. The building of the Ulverscroft cottages was described in considerable detail by Lawrence Weaver, architectural editor of Country Life, in his volumes, Small Country Houses of To-day, published in 1911.

== Stoneywell Wood ==
Stoneywell Wood is an area of ancient woodland adjoining the house and gardens. 4 hectares (9.9 acres) of the wood belong to Stoneywell, which, along with 2 hectares (4.9 acres) of garden are open to the public. Stoneywell Wood as a whole occupies some 17 hectares (42 acres) of deciduous semi-natural woodland, and is part of the 105 hectares (260 acres) Ulverscroft Valley SSSI (Site of Special Scientific Interest).

== Bibliography ==
- Comino, Mary (1980). Gimson and the Barnsleys:'Wonderful furniture of a commonplace kind'. London: Evans Brothers Limited. ISBN 0237448955.
- Drury, Michael (2000). Wandering Architects: In Pursuit of an Arts and Crafts Ideal. Stamford, Lincs: Shaun Tyas. ISBN 190028913X.
- Gradidge, Roderick (1980). Dream Houses: The Edwardian Ideal. London: Constable and Company. ISBN 0094619301.
- Pevsner, Nikolaus; Williamson, Elizabeth (1984). The Buildings of England: Leicestershire and Rutland. New Haven & London: Yale University Press. ISBN 9780300096187.
