= Geoffrey Lupton =

British architect

Geoffrey Henry Lupton (2 September 1882 – 30 December 1949) was a British architect and furniture designer who is best known for his contribution to the Arts and Crafts movement, working with Ernest Gimson and Sidney Barnsley.

== Early life ==
Lupton was born into the Lupton family of Leeds. He was a pupil at Bedales School at its original location at Lindfield, West Sussex, and then from 1900 at its new site near Petersfield, Hampshire. He was head boy and left in 1901. He was then apprenticed to the family engineering firm, Hathorn Davey of Leeds. He erected pumping engines in the Lea Valley around 1903–4 and worked in Germany.

== Arts and Crafts ==
Lupton left Hathorn Davey in 1905 to train as an Arts and Crafts architect, cabinet maker and builder with Ernest Gimson, who was later described by Nikolaus Pevsner as "the greatest of the English architect-designers". He spent a year in Gimson's workshops at Daneway near Sapperton, Gloucestershire. Under Gimson's direction he prepared and built the timber bridge at Hampton Court Palace. He worked as an architect and builder in Hampshire, constructing his home and workplace in Cockshott Lane, Froxfield in 1906–7. The cottage and attached workshops is a good example of his Arts and Crafts philosophy and craftsmanship. He was heavily influenced by the writings of Rudolf Steiner.

Lupton designed and built the "Red House" in Cockshott Lane for his friend Edward Thomas. It had a separate building of which half was a study for Thomas and the rest was for his own beekeeping, which gave it the name "The Bee House". A number of houses in Cockshott Lane and around the nearby village of Steep were either designed and built by Lupton, or built to designs by Gimson or Alfred Powell, or for which he undertook the joinery. In 1913, Lupton built Sir Francis Ogilvie's house, "Dewdney", on Shere Heath, which was considered by Sir Lawrence Weaver to be about the best modern small house of its time. These buildings were of hand-made brick and English oak. In 1911, Lupton commissioned and largely financed Gimson to design the assembly hall at his old school, Bedales. Some years later, Gimson used the hall as the first part of a quadrangle of buildings to include a library, laboratories and a gym. The war intervened, and only the library was built.

Lupton returned to engineering during the Great War. Early in 1915 he joined up as a private serving in the Army Service Corps (ASC), "Ally Sloper's Cavalry", 3rd Heavy Repair Depot in A.S.C. Motor Transport, and was subsequently promoted to captain. He was mentioned in dispatches in May 1918 for work on electrodeposition of metals and, in 1919, was awarded the French Order of Agricultural Merit. A learned paper on his work was presented by his Army Service Corps superior to the Institution of Automobile Engineers in 1920.

After the war, Lupton resumed his work as a craftsman in wood. Gimson, who knew he was dying, had asked Lupton to build the Memorial Library at Bedales School which he had designed. It was to be built next to the 1911 Lupton Assembly Hall and was Gimson's last major project (1918–1919). Lupton, who was supervised by Sidney Barnsley, constructed the library which was completed in 1921. It was estimated to cost £7,000, but building alone cost £10,946, and £2,829 for oak bookshelves and other furniture. The Bedales Memorial Library, Lupton Hall and corridor is one of the few Grade I listed modern buildings in England.

Lupton continued furniture making until 1925 when he passed the business to Edward Barnsley. His work is described in Michael Drury's book, Wandering Architects: In Pursuit of an Arts and Crafts Ideal.

Barnsley, furniture maker and architect and son of Sidney Barnsley, had taken the tenancy of the workshop in 1923 and moved into the cottage in 1926. Barnsley lived and worked there as a designer craftsman until his death in 1987.

== Later years ==
In 1926, Lupton bought some hundred acres of veldt near Elgin, on the Palmiet River, 50 miles from Cape Town where he built a farmhouse, thatched it with local reed and set to work to make the most unpromising soil productive. Clearing, breaking up, ploughing in lupin, irrigating by means of wooden pipes from a great pump, put in by himself in the river below, he succeeded in growing almonds, peaches, and to some extent apples, which do not thrive in South Africa, and kept cows and poultry. In Elgin he designed a tiny church, thatched and whitewashed, for the English settlers. He built the round chancel arch with his own hands.

He returned to England in 1937 and bought North Wyke Farm near North Tawton in Devon which he worked during the Second World War.

In 1946–7, influenced by L. T. C. Rolt's book Narrow Boat, he joined the Inland Waterways Association and bought a narrowboat which he converted for cruising, working on it on the open canalside near Norwood while he was living in Chiswick. With his 9-year-old son as crew, a 429-mile tour of English canals occupied June and July 1947, including stops to repair the boat's diesel engine and to continue the conversion work.

In 1948 he was again drawn to emigrate to Africa (this time to Southern Rhodesia), where he was engrossed in building up yet another farm when he met his death, while dealing with a bull, on 30 December 1949.
