= Ulverscroft =

Civil parish in Leicestershire, England

Coordinates: 52.704°N 1.267°W

Ulverscroft is a civil parish in the Charnwood district of Leicestershire. It has a population of about 100. The population in 2011 is included in the civil parish of Newtown Linford. There is no village by the name, but there was previously an Ulverscroft Priory.

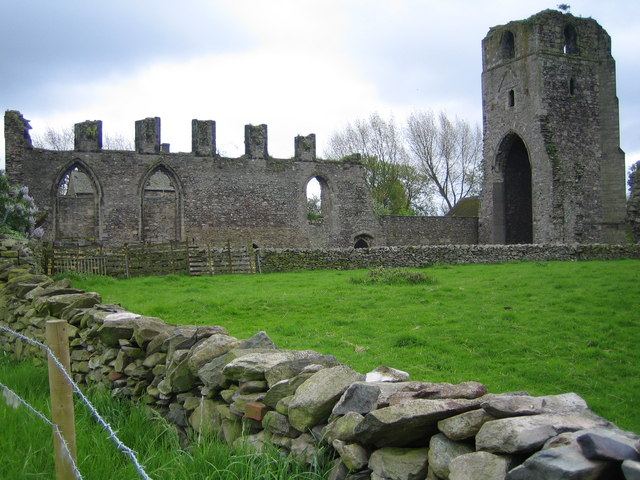
Ruins of the Augustinian priory in Ulverscroft

There are some good examples of early Arts and Crafts movement architecture in and around Ulverscroft including Stoneywell by Ernest Gimson. Stoneywell, now a National Trust property, opened to the public in 2015.

== See also ==
- Ulverscroft Nature Reserve
- Ulverscroft Valley
