= Peter Waals =

Dutch cabinet maker

Peter Waals (30 January 1870 – May 1937), born Pieter van der Waals, was a Dutch cabinet maker associated with the Arts and Crafts movement.

== Arts and Crafts ==
Born in The Hague to Jan van der Waals and Lena Alida Maria Loorij, Peter Waals was the nephew of the Nobel Prize-winning physicist Johannes Diderik van der Waals. Trained as a cabinet maker in his native Netherlands, Waals spent three years working in Brussels, Berlin and Vienna before moving to London where he was introduced to Ernest Gimson in 1901.

=== Cabinet maker ===
Gimson had set up a small workshop in Cirencester, Gloucestershire, and then at Daneway House at Sapperton, making furniture, turned chairs, and metalwork to his own designs. Waals was offered the position of foreman/manager and chief cabinet maker and accepted, spending the rest of his life in the Cotswolds. The furniture and craft work produced by the workshop under the day-to-day supervision of Waals is regarded as a supreme achievement of the Arts and Crafts movement of its period and is well represented in the principal collections of the decorative arts in Britain and the United States of America. The architectural historian Nikolaus Pevsner called Gimson "the greatest of the English artist-craftsmen."

=== Workshop owner and designer ===
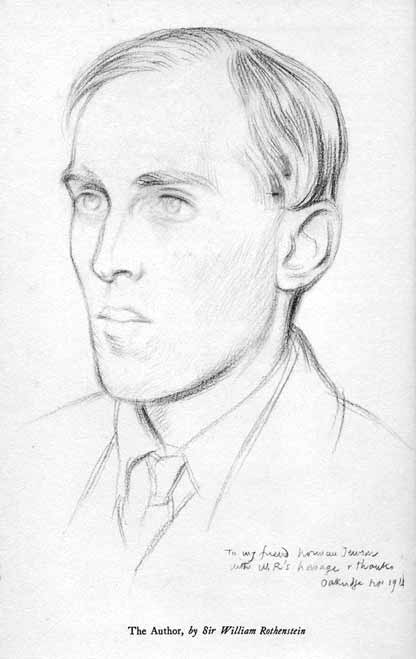
Norman Jewson

After Gimson's death in 1919 Peter Waals continued to run the Daneway Workshops. By the end of the year he was canvassing potential clients in his own name on Daneway headed paper The following year he was able to set up his own workshop at Halliday's Mill with the help of Alfred James, at the foot of Cowcombe Hill in the nearby village of Chalford, employing many of Gimson's skilled craftsmen including designer Norman Jewson. Chalford was a more practical location for a workshop than Sapperton, since it was close to a railway station and had more accessible roads.

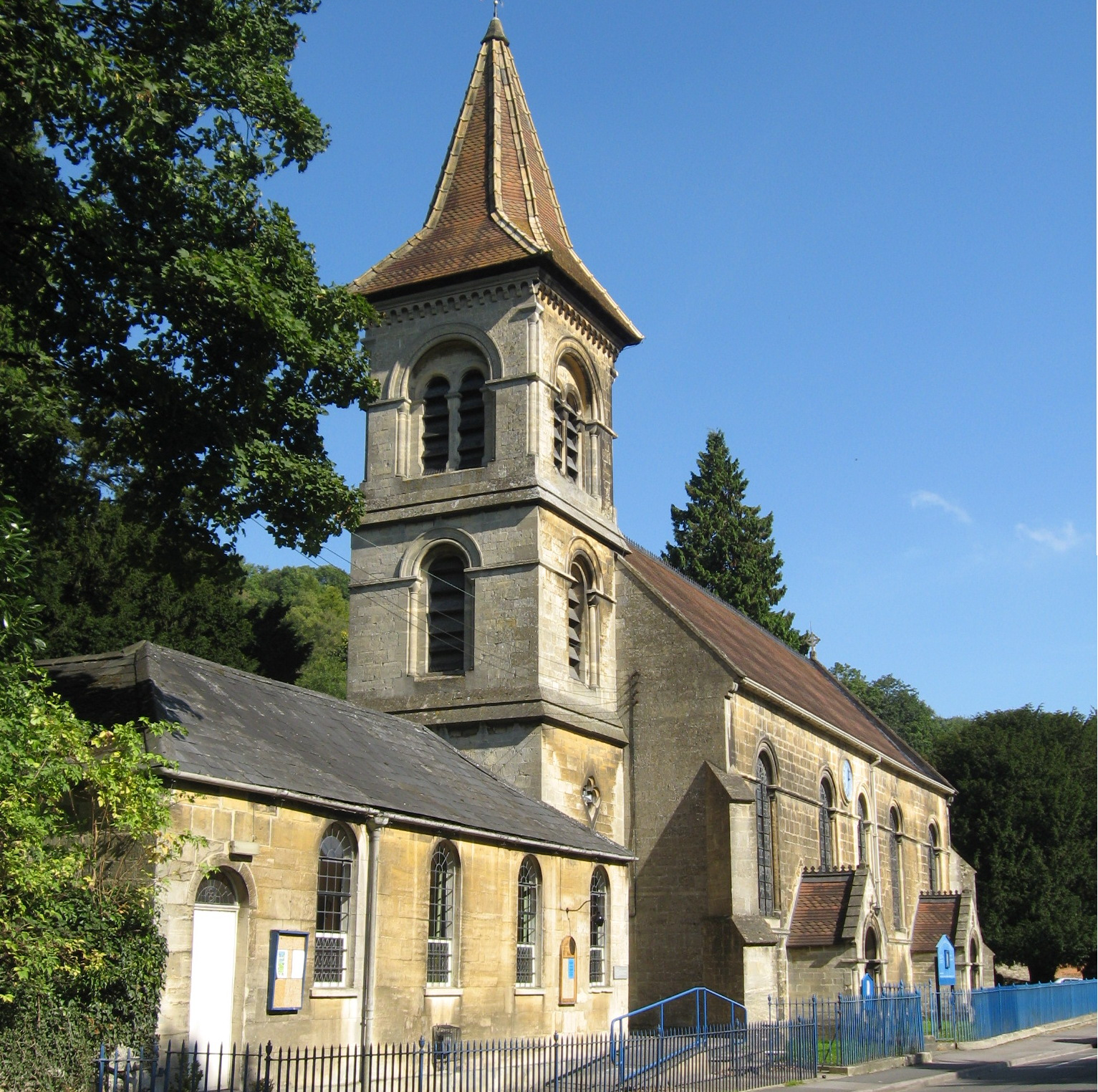
Christ Church, Chalford

Many examples of his own work, and that produced by other craftsmen in his workshop, can be found in Christ Church there. They include the organ gallery, the chancel screen and the lectern, all of which were designed by Jewson. The cover of the font, which lifts and descends by means of a counterbalance in the roof space, was carved by one of Waals' craftsmen, Owen Scrubey.

From 1920 to 1937 the workshop produced high quality furniture to Waals' and Jewson's designs and also trained apprentices in the Arts and Crafts tradition. An apprenticeship at the Chalford workshop with Waals lasted from five to six years, and apprentices were on trial for three months without pay. One such apprentice was New Age thinker Sir George Trevelyan who died in the bed he made there. Furniture produced during this period now features in exhibitions and catalogues of leading art houses and auction rooms.

=== Teacher ===
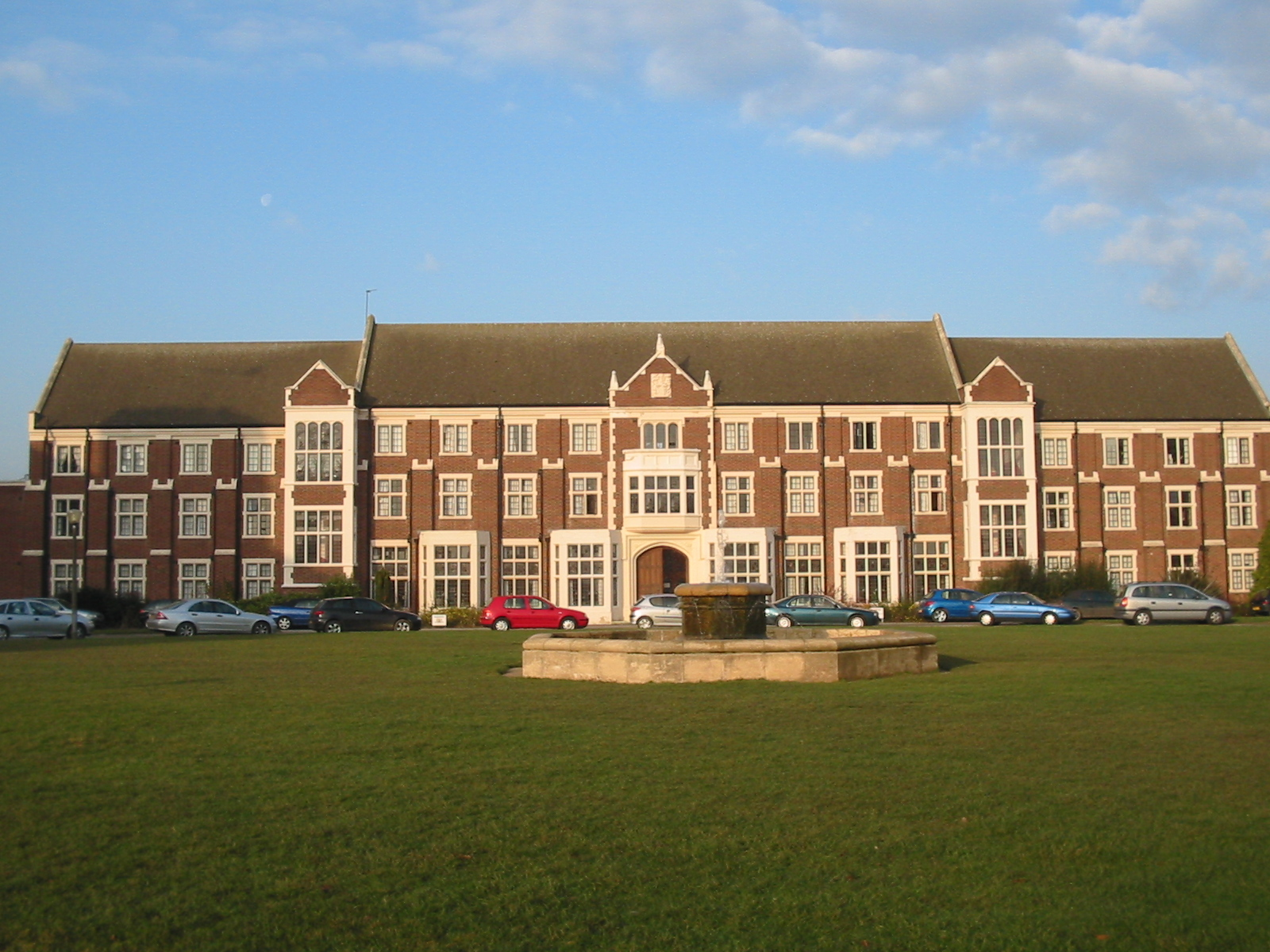
Rutland Hall

In 1935 Waals was invited to act as consultant in design at Loughborough College which was the main centre for the training of handicraft teachers in England. There, Waals instructed students in the approach and high standards of craftsmanship required in the making of furniture that had been established by Ernest Gimson and the Barnsley brothers in Sapperton. He also designed all the furniture for Hazlerigg Hall as well as other fittings throughout the college, and these were built by his students. The college is now part of Loughborough University, and furniture design drawings by Peter Waals are deposited in the University Archives.

Peter Waals died in May 1937, and lies buried in the churchyard at Chalford. A disastrous fire in his workshops in 1938 ended his widow's attempts to continue production there.
