= Daneway House =

Coordinates: 51°43′53″N 2°05′13″W

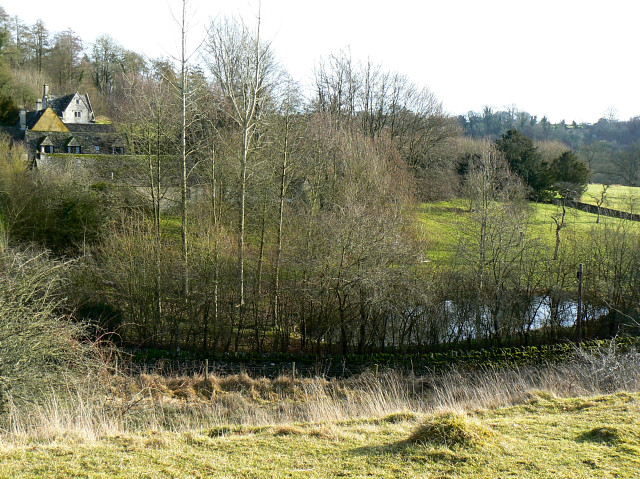
Daneway House

Daneway House is a grade I listed house in the parish of Bisley-with-Lypiatt but close to Sapperton in Gloucestershire, England.

The house was built in the 14th century but revised several times since. It the early 20th century it became a workshop and showroom for Ernest Gimson and the Barnsley brothers who were important designers of the arts and crafts movement.

== History ==
The house dates from the 14th century when it was built for the Clifford family. Major revisions to the fabric of the building occurred around 1620 and again in 1717. In 1674 the "High Building" was added, by John Hancox, which has four storeys and an attic.

Daneway House was lent by Lord Bathurst to Ernest Gimson and the Barnsley brothers after their move from Pinbury Park and it formed a suitable display case for their traditionally designed arts and crafts furniture. Grimson used a two-storey outhouse as a drawing office. There were also workshops and the main house was used as a showroom. When Gimson died in 1919, Peter Waals continued to run the Daneway Workshops for two years. From 1922 until his death in 1933 the house was let, as a country retreat, to Emery Walker, founder of Doves Press and close friend of William Morris. After 1948 it was the home of architect Oliver Hill. It was further restored in the 1960s.

== Architecture ==
The limestone building has a stone tile roof. The old medieval hall now has a floor dividing it. The gable end of the hall is supported by buttresses. The four-storey "High Building", which was added around 1620, has a moulded parapet gable at each end and a small stair turret. The rooms have Jacobean plaster ceilings.
