= Lea Meadows =

Nature reserve in Leicestershire

Coordinates: 52.699°N 1.253°W

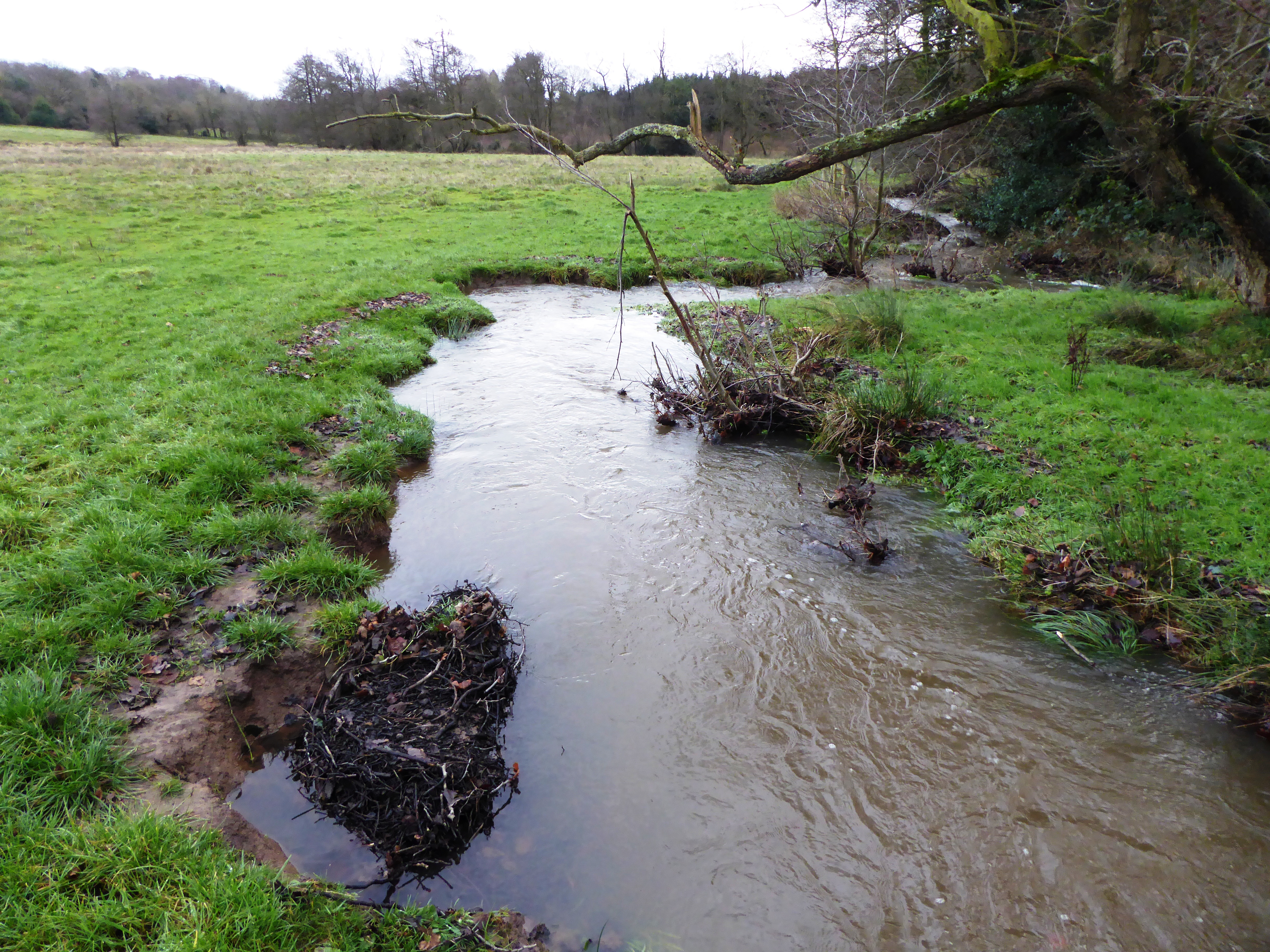
- Interactive map of Lea Meadows
- Type: Nature reserve
- Location: Markfield, Leicestershire
- Area: 12 hectares (30 acres)
- Manager: Leicestershire and Rutland Wildlife Trust

Lea Meadows is a 12-hectare (30-acre) nature reserve east of Markfield in Leicestershire. It is owned and managed by the Leicestershire and Rutland Wildlife Trust. It is part of the Ulverscroft Valley, which is a Site of Special Scientific Interest, and part of it is a scheduled monument.

Over 240 species of plants have been recorded on these unimproved marshy meadows, and there is a stream which has white-clawed crayfish and brook lampreys, both of which are legally protected. Part of the site is surrounded by a medieval moat.

There is access from Ulverscroft Lane.
