= Rodmarton Manor =

Country house in England

Coordinates: 51.6781°N 2.0837°W

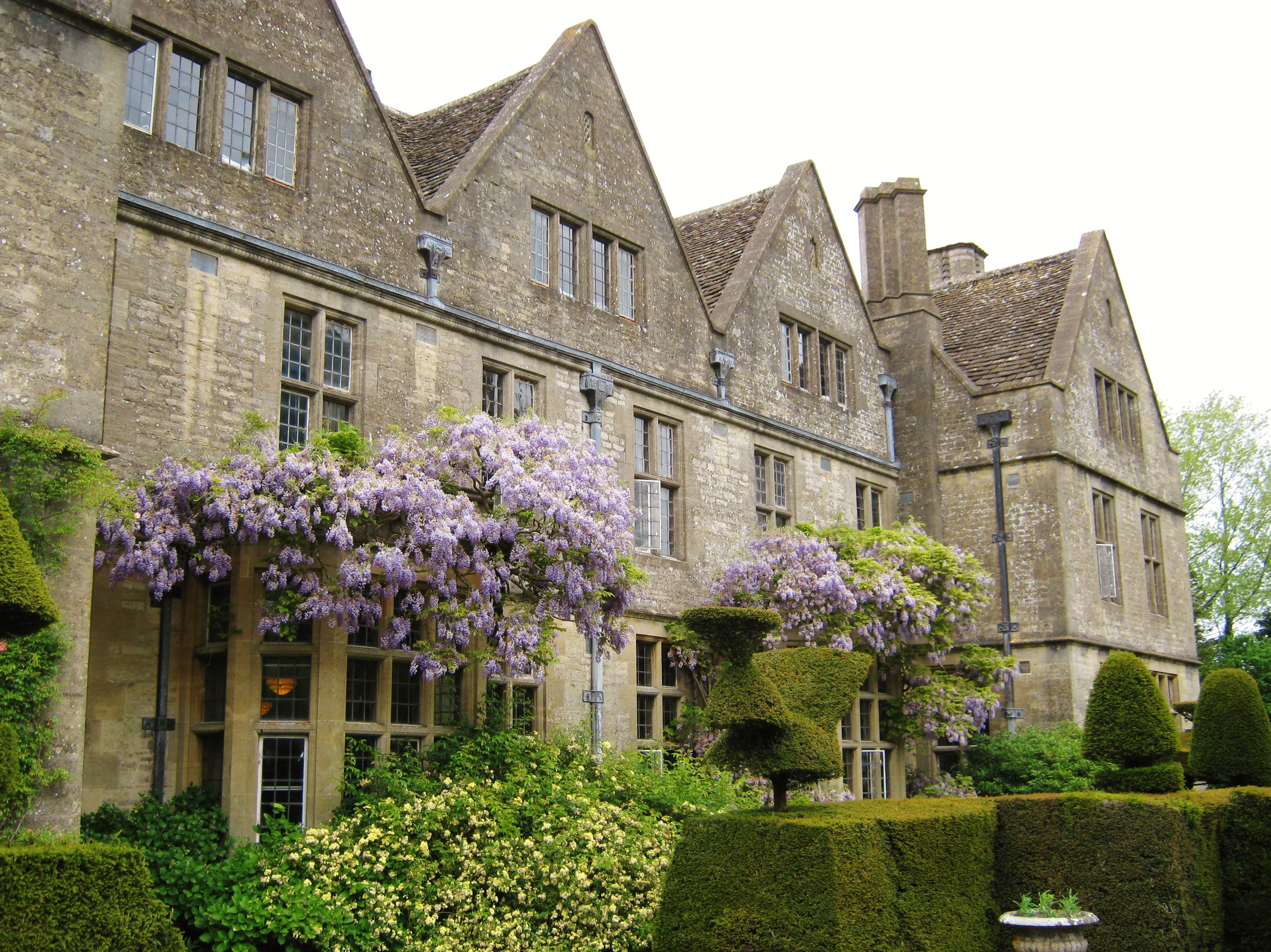
- Interactive map of the Rodmarton Manor area

General information
- Type: Country house
- Architectural style: Arts and Crafts movement
- Classification: Grade I listed building
- Location: Rodmarton, near Cirencester, Gloucestershire, England
- Construction started: 1909
- Completed: 1926-1929
- Owner: Biddulph family

Height
- Roof: Stone slate

Technical details
- Material: Stone
- Floor count: 2

Design and construction
- Architect: Ernest Barnsley

Website
- rodmarton-manor.co.uk

Rodmarton Manor is a large country house, in Rodmarton, near Cirencester, Gloucestershire, built for the Biddulph family. It is a Grade I listed building. It was constructed in the early 20th century in an Arts and Crafts style, to a design by Ernest Barnsley. After Ernest's death in 1925, it was completed by Sidney Barnsley, his brother, and then by Norman Jewson, Ernest's son-in-law. All the construction materials were obtained locally, and hand worked by local craftsmen.

The three wings of the house are angled around a central, circular, lawned courtyard. The east wing, originally for servants, has been converted into flats, whilst the central "public" wing was not lived in by the family, instead being used for community teaching and events. Crafts were taught in the building and the vast majority of the furniture was commissioned for the house and built locally. The southern gardens used hedges to create specific spaces, giving the impression of exterior "rooms" next to the house, with an extensive kitchen garden which provided much of the food for the house. The house was described by the designer Charles Ashbee as the single best example of the Arts and Crafts movement.

During World War II, the house was used as an evacuation point for a London Catholic school, and a maternity house due to the shortage of midwives.

== History ==
In 1894, Claud Biddulph, youngest son of the politician Sir Michael Biddulph, was given 500 acres (200 ha) of land by his father and in 1906, he committed £5000 (worth approximately £2 million in 2015) (Note: Comparing average earnings between 1894 and 2015, £5000 is valued at approximately £2,076,000.00 by MeasuringWorth.com) per year to building a house. Biddulph and his wife, Margaret, were passionate about the Arts and Crafts movement, a design movement focused on restoring traditional approaches to decorative craftwork and fine art, so he commissioned architect Ernest Barnsley to create the house in that style. Biddulph referred to the manor as a "cottage in the country". The Biddulphs originally hoped for a large village house, a focal point for the village community, who would work on craft projects in the house. Barnsley had settled in the Cotswolds in 1893 with his brother, leaving their successful Birmingham architecture firm behind, to focus on traditional crafting methods without machines.

Building began in 1909, using oak from the estate, metalwork from local blacksmiths, and stone quarried locally, brought to the site by a private railway line. Barnsley insisted that no machines would be used, so instead of using a saw powered by steam engine, the wood was hand-sawn in a saw pit. The east wing was completed by 1915, and the Biddulphs moved into them, with the reception rooms finished around the same time. Despite the grandeur of the building, the Biddulph's lived in some small rooms and fitted the large reception rooms for community use. Biddulph also built some cottages at the site of the old manor house at Rodmarton around the same time.

As the Biddulphs were interested in the Arts and Crafts movement, using the manor house to give classes for villagers in crafts such as woodwork and embroidery. There were also plays and musical events for the villagers, including puppet shows for the children. Construction was paused during World War I and Barnsley died in 1926. The final part of the build was completed between 1926 and 1929 under the supervision of his brother, Sidney and his son-in-law, Norman Jewson. The built took a total of 23 years, largely due to the traditional methods being used, but also as no contractor was hired to manage the build.

During World War II, Rodmarton Manor was used as an evacuation point for Sisters of Marie-Auxiliatrice school in Finchley, with over 150 children living there. Biddulph also offered the house rent free to act as a maternity house from 1943 until the end of World War II, due to the shortage of midwives who could attend people at their homes. When Anthony Biddulph took over the house in 1954 on the death of his father, he decided to convert the east wing into flats, living in the "public" wing.

== House ==
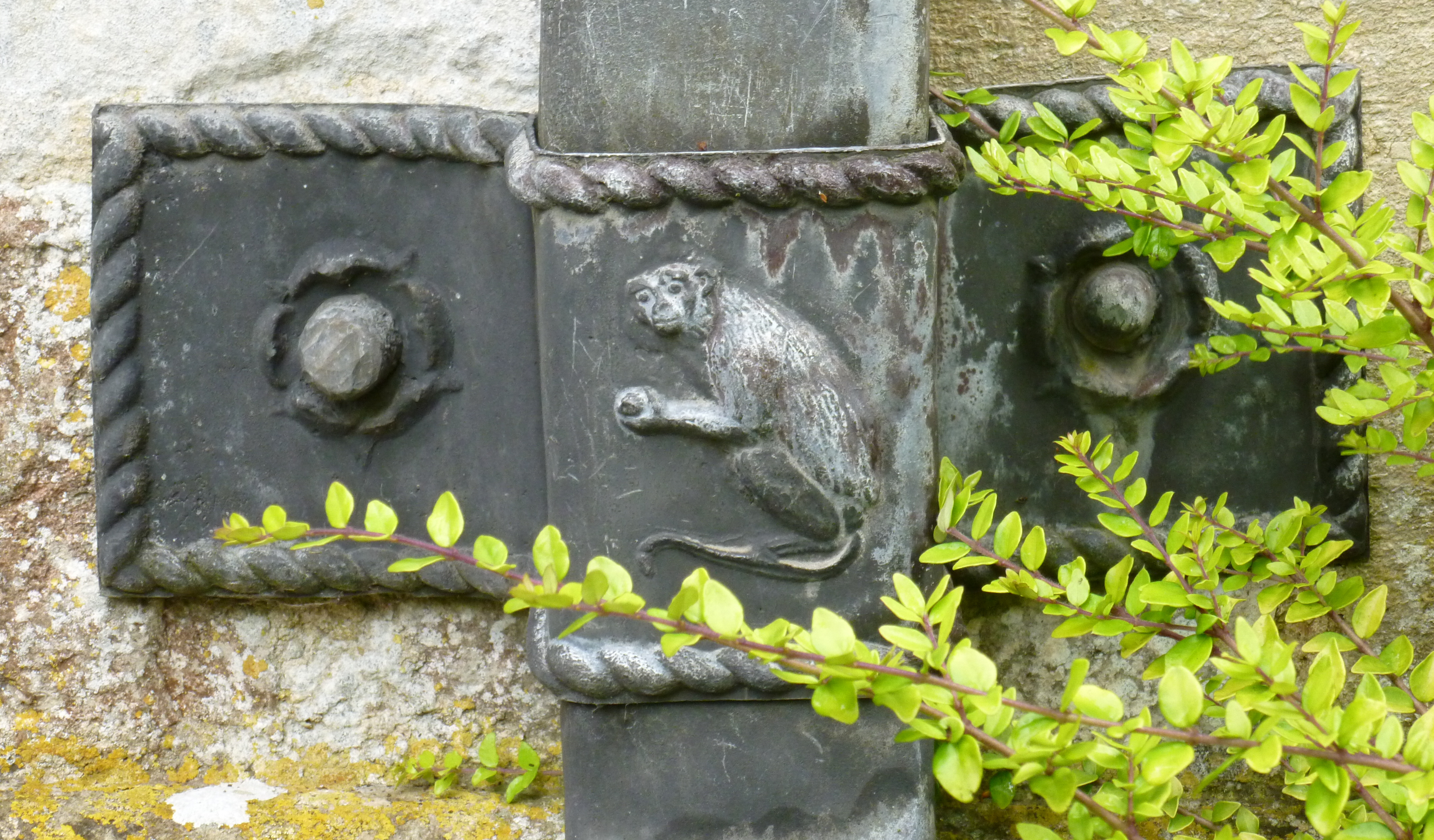
The rainwater pipes are embossed with images such as this monkey

Rodmarton Manor is a country house built between 1909 and 1929, built from local materials, worked by local craftsmen. It was built as three wings, viewed in plan as three sides of an octagon, around a large circular courtyard, covered in grass which is designed to be reminiscent of a village green. The majority of the building is two storeys high and made of coursed cut stone, the plinth is offset and the quoins are flush. The roof is made of stone slate, with grouped chimneystacks.

The north facade has a gabled porch bay which includes an arched doorway with a stone monogram above. On each side of the entrance bay, there are two gables, with bays where the wings are set at an angle. The north-west wing includes a chapel, with a twin-arched loggia and its own porch. The east wing was previously the service wing. The building's rainwater pipes are embossed with animals and flowers.

Inside the Rodmarton Manor, there are 74 rooms of which 19 are bedrooms, all named after local fields. The porch bay leads to the "public" wing, with a long hall which runs for the wing's full length. Off the hall is the drawing room, which decorated with hanging tapestries, designed by Hilda Sexton. The drawing room connects through to a large library, originally a ballroom, which was regularly used for performances. The library connects to the formal dining room, which was not used often due to the distance from the kitchen. The furniture throughout was all commissioned specifically for the house and built by local workshops, including some by Alfred Hoare Powell. The building was designated Grade I listed status on 4 June 1952 and was described by Charles Ashbee as the single best example of the Arts and Crafts movement.

== Gardens ==
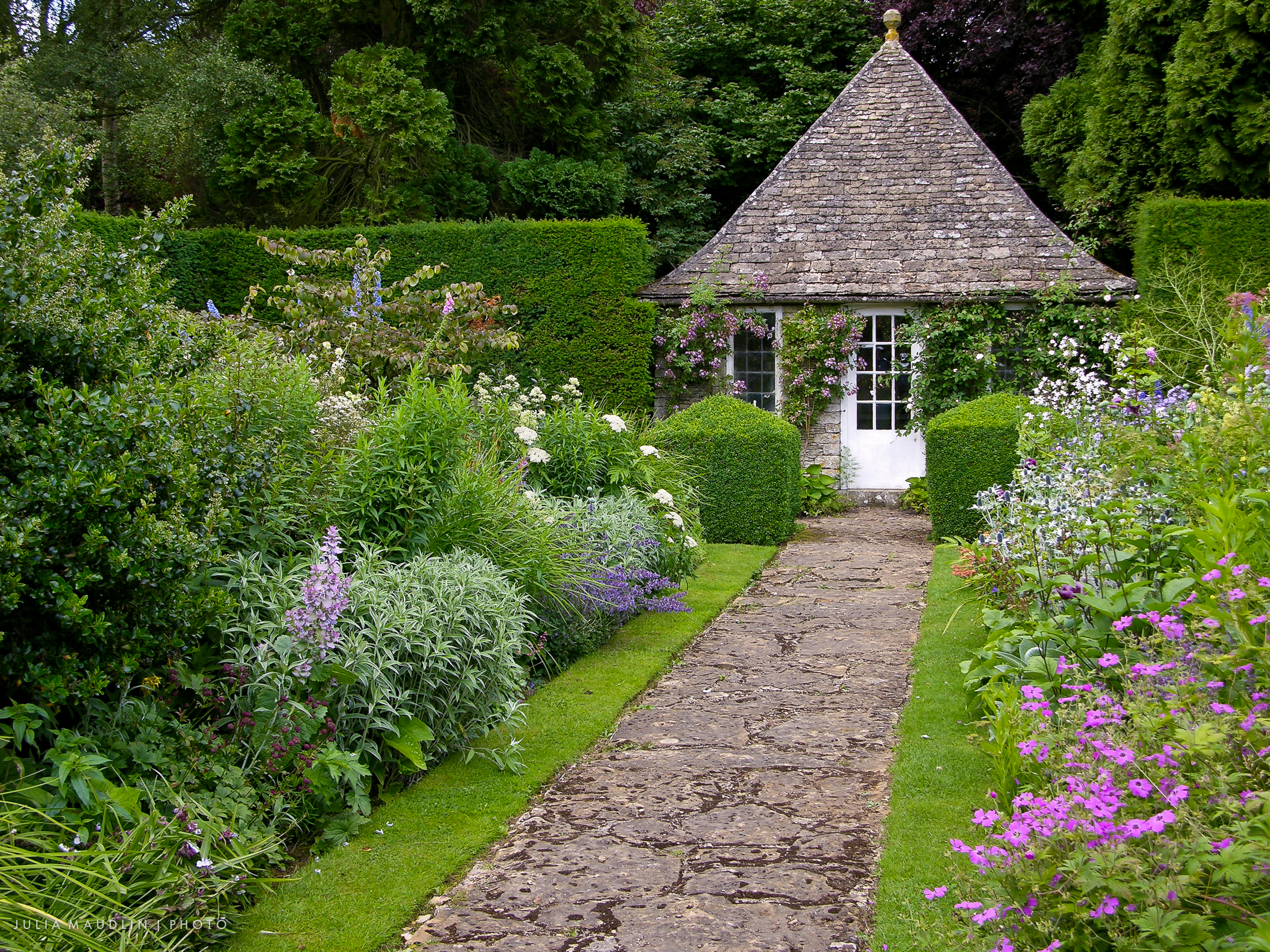
The pavilion at the end of the Long Garden

The gardens are Grade II* listed on the Register of Historic Parks and Gardens. The gardens of the house were also created in line with the Arts and Crafts movement, providing food for the house. Influenced strongly by Margaret Bidulph, who had studied at Studley Horticultural College, where she had met her future head gardener William Scrubey. Scrubey and Margaret Biddulph would go on to plant the gardens together. The terrace and gardens south to the south of the house include yew hedges to create specific spaces, mixed with Portuguese laurels and roses, giving the impression of exterior rooms next to the house. Nearby is an area of topiary, clipped in domes and tiers. At the far end of the south terrace is a ha-ha, leading to a cherry orchard and tennis courts, although only one tennis court remains, the others have been converted in a croquet lawn and a swimming pool.

The northern garden includes a small pavilion and a small pond with seating areas. It also includes a 70 by 50 metres (230 by 160 ft) kitchen garden, with fruit trees. At 75 metres (246 ft) long and 15 metres (49 ft) wide, the largest part is known as the Long Garden, between a wall and a yew hedge, with a long flagstone path through a lawn with the pool in the centre and leading up to the pavilion at the end. On the other side of the yew hedge is the Leisure Garden, designed to be a garden which does not need weeding, from which there are paths to the "Troughery", the Sunken Garden, the Winter Garden and back to the Terrace. The "Troughery" is a small garden which creates features from stone troughs and staddle stones, surrounded by topiary.
