= St Kenelm's Church, Sapperton, Gloucestershire =

Church in Sapperton, Gloucestershire, England

Coordinates: 51°43′46″N 2°04′39″W

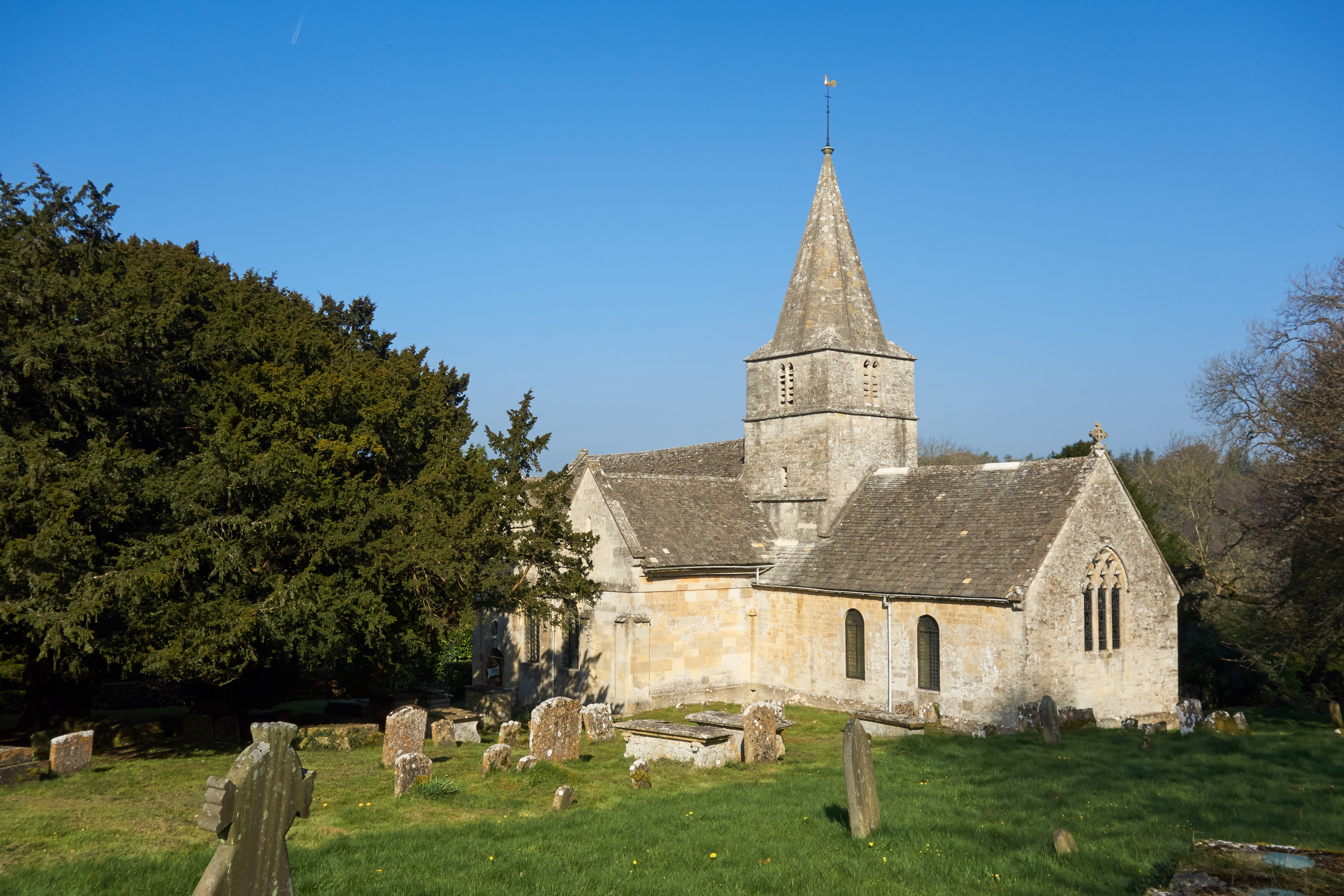
St. Kenelm's Church, Sapperton, Gloucestershire

St Kenelm's Church is a historic church in Sapperton, Gloucestershire in the care of The Churches Conservation Trust. It is listed Grade I on the National Heritage List for England. The churchyard contains several notable graves in the churchyard, a few of which are listed.

== History ==
Sapperton parish church was founded in the early 12th century and has some traces remaining in north transept. The crossing tower and nave and chancel roofs are 14th century, and the church was largely rebuilt by Atkyns family at the beginning of the 18th century.

The church is dedicated to St Kenelm.

The church was made redundant and became the 350th church to be vested in The Churches Conservation Trust in 2016.

== Architecture ==
=== Exterior ===
St Kenelm is constructed of squared and coursed rubble stone, with nave and south transept of ashlar. The church has a Cotswold stone- slate roof with coped gables surmounted with cross saddle stones and additional cross finial to chancel gable only.

It has a cruciform plan with tower to east of transepts. The tower has 2 stages with off-sets, double belfry openings with trefoil head on top stage, a broach spire and weathervane.

The south transept has twin gables with moulded entrance doorway on left. The chancel windows are round-headed with some of original clear greenish glass of the early 18th century.

=== Interior ===
The tower is supported on four 14th-century arches. The font in the south porch is 15th-century.

The spectacular carved pew ends and panelling in the south transept, the gallery frontal and oak cornice all came from the dining room at Sapperton Park, which was demolished c.1730.

There is a very fine collection of monuments. In the north transept is a large Renaissance tomb of Sir Henry Poole who died in 1616, with kneeling marble effigies of him and his family, including daughter Elinor Fettiplace (born Elinor Poole, later Elinor Rogers). There is also a recumbent stone knight and Renaissance canopy, on the east wall of the north transept, by Gildo or Gildon of Hereford.

In south transept there is a substantial monument to Sir Robert Atkyns, the historian of Gloucestershire who died in 1711, by Edward Stanton.

== Cemetery ==
Near the south chancel wall is the grave of Rebekah Mason, the first wife of the astronomer Charles Mason (d. 1787). With Jeremiah Dixon, Charles surveyed a boundary to resolve a border dispute involving Maryland and Pennsylvania in the 18th century. After Pennsylvania abolished slavery, the Mason-Dixon line separated the states where slavery was legal and those where it was not.

Sapperton village was closely associated with the Arts & Crafts movement, and the cemetery also includes the graves of Ernest Gimson and Ernest and Sidney Barnsley, furniture makers and leaders of the movement (Ernest Barnsley also designed the nearby village hall), and the eminent printer and colleague of William Morris, Emery Walker.
