= Edward Barnsley =

English furniture designer (1900–1987)

William Edward Barnsley CBE (7 February 1900 – 2 December 1987) was an English designer and maker of furniture, teacher and important figure in the 20th-century British craft movement.

Born in Duntisbourne Rouse, Gloucestershire, he was the son of Sidney Barnsley who trained as an architect with Norman Shaw, and the nephew of Ernest Barnsley. These two family members were leading figure heads of the Arts and Crafts movement along with their friend, Ernest Gimson. Edward Barnsley was educated at Bedales School, and as a young man, worked on the building of the school's Grade I listed library, which was designed by Gimson.

Barnsley's most celebrated work is possibly the archbishop's throne and lectern in Canterbury Cathedral.

He was appointed a Commander of the Order of the British Empire for services to design in the 1945 New Year Honours.

He died in Portsmouth, aged 87.
