= Sophie-Thérèse de Soubiran La Louvière =

French Roman Catholic nun

Blessed Sophie-Thérèse de Soubiran La Louvière
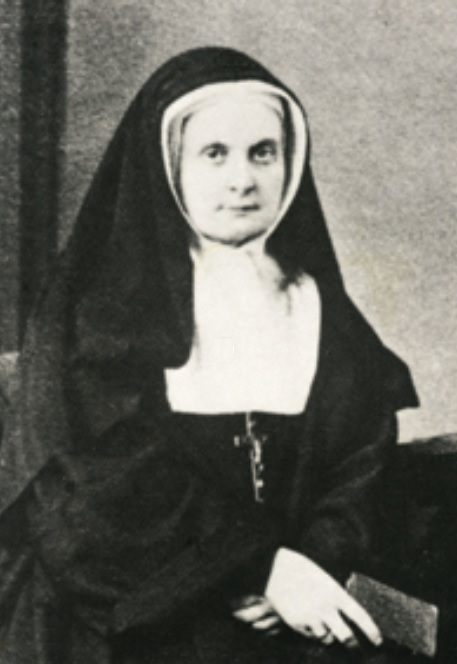

Religious
- Born: 16 May 1834; Castelnaudary, Aude, France
- Died: 7 June 1889 (aged 55); Paris, France
- Venerated in: Roman Catholic Church
- Beatified: 20 October 1946, Saint Peter's Basilica, Vatican City by Pope Pius XII
- Feast: 7 June
- Attributes: Religious habit
- Patronage: Sisters of Marie-Auxiliatrice

Sophie-Thérèse de Soubiran La Louvière French pronunciation: [maʁi teʁɛz d subiʁã la luvjɛʁ] (16 May 1834 – 7 June 1889) was a French Roman Catholic nun who established the Sisters of Marie-Auxiliatrice. She adopted the name of Marie of the Sacred Heart in 1877 after she had become a nun.

Pope Pius XII beatified her on 20 October 1946 after the recognition of two miracles found to have been attributed to her intercession.

== Life ==
Sophie-Thérèse de Soubiran La Louvière was born in 1834 in France to Joseph Paul Comte de Soubiran and Noemi de Gélis. She received her First Communion on 29 June 1845.

At the age of 20 she renounced her plans to become a Carmelite nun to achieve the aims that her priest uncle Louis de Soubiran had set out for his parish. She attended a retreat under the Jesuit Paul Ginhac and decided to establish her own religious institution in 1864 with a focus on girls. Pope Pius IX – on 19 December 1868 – issued a Decree of Praise for the new order.

Trouble began in 1869, the year after the community was authorized, with the profession of a new sister, who claimed to be a widow. Louvière trained her to keep the books of the order. In 1870 she fled to London due to the Franco-Prussian War and returned home after the Treaty of Frankfurt in May 1871. When she returned, she found herself accused of financial mismanagement by the new sister, with evidence out of the books. As a result, Louvière was forced to leave the community. It took a few years for her to find a community that would accept her; to support herself in the meantime, she took in embroidery. Finally, she was accepted by the Paris monastery of Our Lady of Charity in 1874, where she took vows three years later under the name Marie of the Sacred Heart.

Her health began to take a steep decline after 1881 and she taught at various places in France. Despite the pain she endured she continued to teach catechism to people. She died on 7 June 1889 with her last words being: "Come, Lord Jesus, come!"

Two years later, a new Mary Help of Christians superior reviewed the allegations, as Louvière's book-keeping nemesis had fled the convent, and her husband had come looking for her. As a result of the subsequent examination, it was discovered that the fled book-keeper had embezzled monies of the order, and falsified the books so as to throw the blame on Louvière. The founder was vindicated, and her reputation was restored.

== Sainthood ==
The beatification process started in Paris on 9 May 1934 under Pope Pius XI which granted her the title of Servant of God. The two processes that ensured were ratified in a decree on 22 March 1938. Pope Pius XII conferred upon her the title of Venerable on 7 August 1940 after the recognition of her life of heroic virtue.

Two miracles attributed to her were approved in 1945 and Pius XII beatified her on 20 October 1947 .
