= Ernest Gimson =

English furniture designer and architect (1864–1919)

- Born: Ernest William Gimson; 21 December 1864; Leicester, England
- Died: 12 August 1919 (aged 54); Sapperton, England
- Occupation: Architect

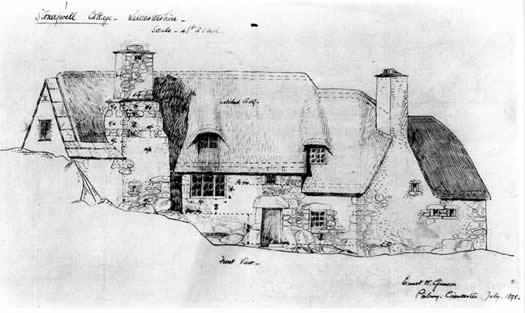
Drawing of Stoneywell by Ernest Gimson, July 1898

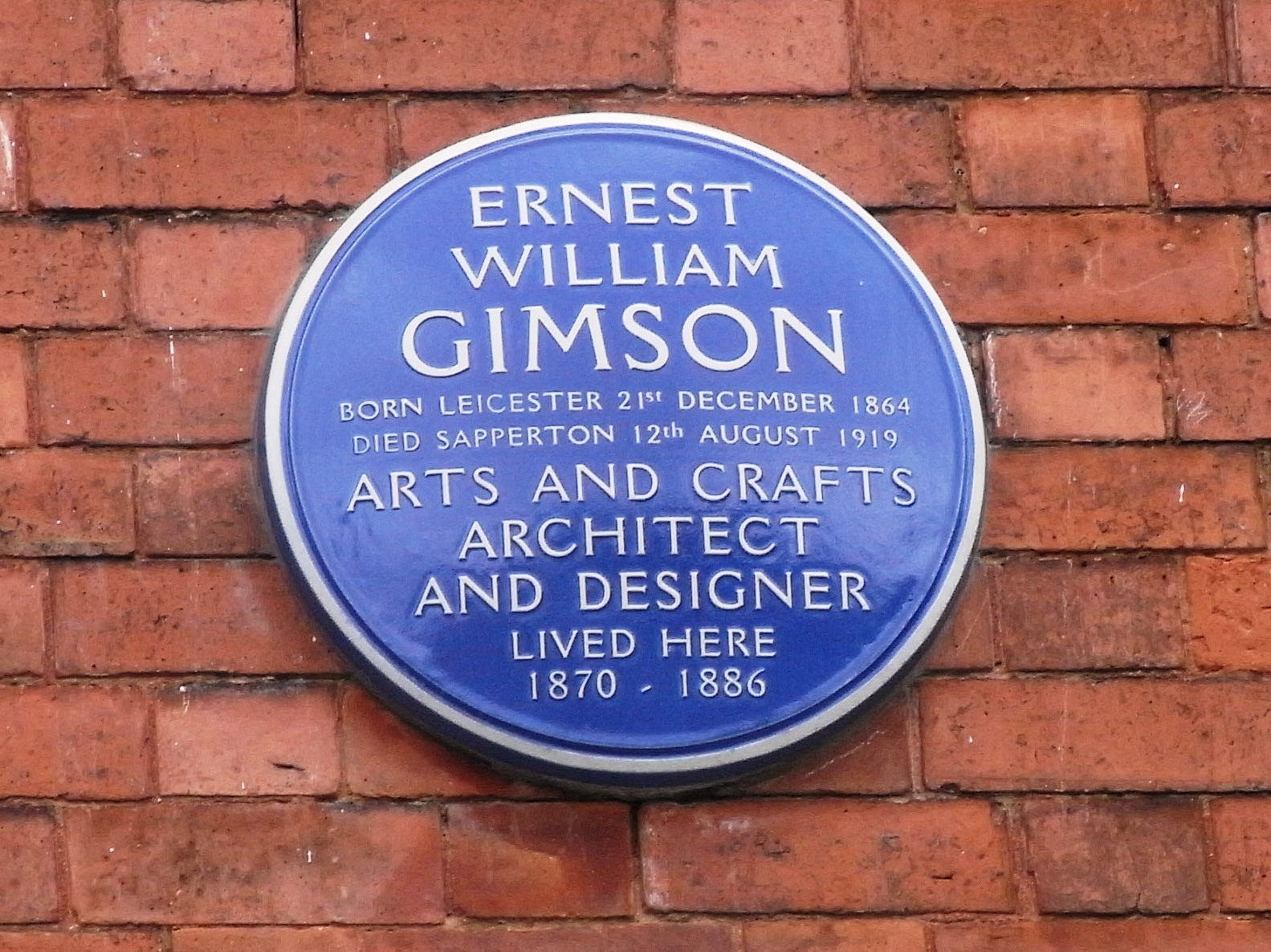
Ernest Gimson Blue Plaque displayed at the Belmont Hotel, De Montfort Street / New Walk, Leicester

Ernest William Gimson (/ˈdʒɪmsən/; 21 December 1864 – 12 August 1919) was an English furniture designer and architect. He was described by the art critic Nikolaus Pevsner as "the greatest of the English architect-designers". Today his reputation is securely established as one of the most influential designers of the English Arts and Crafts movement in the late nineteenth and early twentieth centuries.

== Early career ==
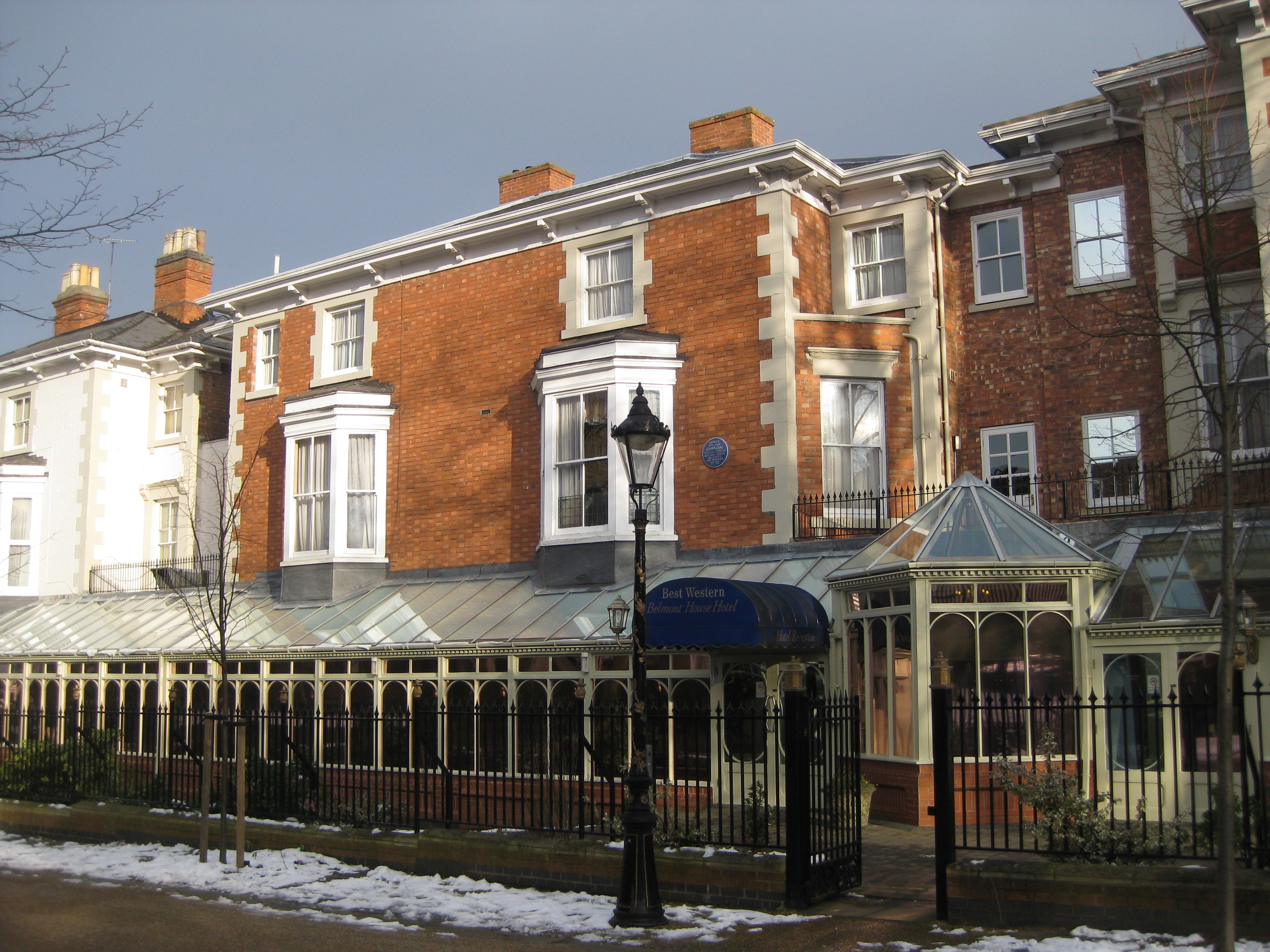
118 New Walk, Leicester: Gimson's childhood home

Ernest Gimson was born in Leicester, in the East Midlands of England, in 1864, the son of Josiah Gimson, engineer and iron founder, founder of Gimson and Company, owner of the Vulcan Works. Ernest was articled to the Leicester architect Isaac Barradale, and worked at his offices on Grey Friars between 1881 and 1885. Aged 19, he attended a lecture on 'Art and Socialism' at the Leicester Secular Society given by the leader of the Arts and Crafts revival in Victorian England, William Morris, and, greatly inspired, talked with him until two in the morning, after the lecture.

Two years later, aged 21, Gimson had both architectural experience and a first class result from classes at Leicester School of Art. He moved to London to gain wider experience, and William Morris wrote him letters of recommendation. The first architectural practice he approached was John Dando Sedding, where he was taken on, and stayed for two years. Gimson derived from Sedding his interest in craft techniques, the stress on textures and surfaces, naturalistic detail of flowers, leaves and animals, always drawn from life, the close involvement of the architect in the simple processes of building and in the supervision of a team of craftsmen employed direct. Sedding's offices were next door to the showrooms of Morris & Co., providing opportunity to see first-hand the first flourishing of Arts and Crafts design. He met Ernest Barnsley at Sedding's studio, and through him, Sidney Barnsley, a friendship that was to last the rest of his life.

After a brief period traveling in both Britain and Europe, Gimson settled in London again and in 1889 he joined Morris's Society for the Protection of Ancient Buildings (SPAB). In 1890, he was a founder member of the short-lived furniture company, Kenton and Co., with Sidney Barnsley, Alfred Hoare Powell, W.R. Lethaby, Mervyn Macartney, Col. Mallet and Reginald Blomfield. Here they acted as designers rather than craftsmen and explored inventive ways of articulating traditional crafts, "the common facts of traditional building", as Philip Webb, "their particular prophet", had taught. Gimson had also, through the Art Workers' Guild, become interested in a more hands on approach to traditional crafts, and in 1890 spent time with Philip Clissett in Bosbury, Herefordshire, learning to make rush-seated ladderback chairs. He also began experimenting with plaster work.

== Sapperton, Gloucestershire ==
Gimson and the Barnsley brothers moved to the rural region of the Cotswolds in Gloucestershire in 1893 "to live near to nature". They soon settled at Pinbury Park, near Sapperton, on the Cirencester estate, under the patronage of the Bathurst family. In 1900, he set up a small furniture workshop in Cirencester, moving to larger workshops at Daneway House, a small medieval manor house at Sapperton. He later built his own house in the village, where he stayed until his death in 1919. He strove to invigorate the village community and, encouraged by his success, planned to found a Utopian craft village. He concentrated on designing furniture, made by craftsmen, under his chief cabinet-maker, Peter van der Waals, whom he engaged in 1901. Gimson, his wife Emily Thomson, and the Barnsley Brothers are all buried in the churchyard of St Kenelm's Church, Sapperton.

== Architectural work ==
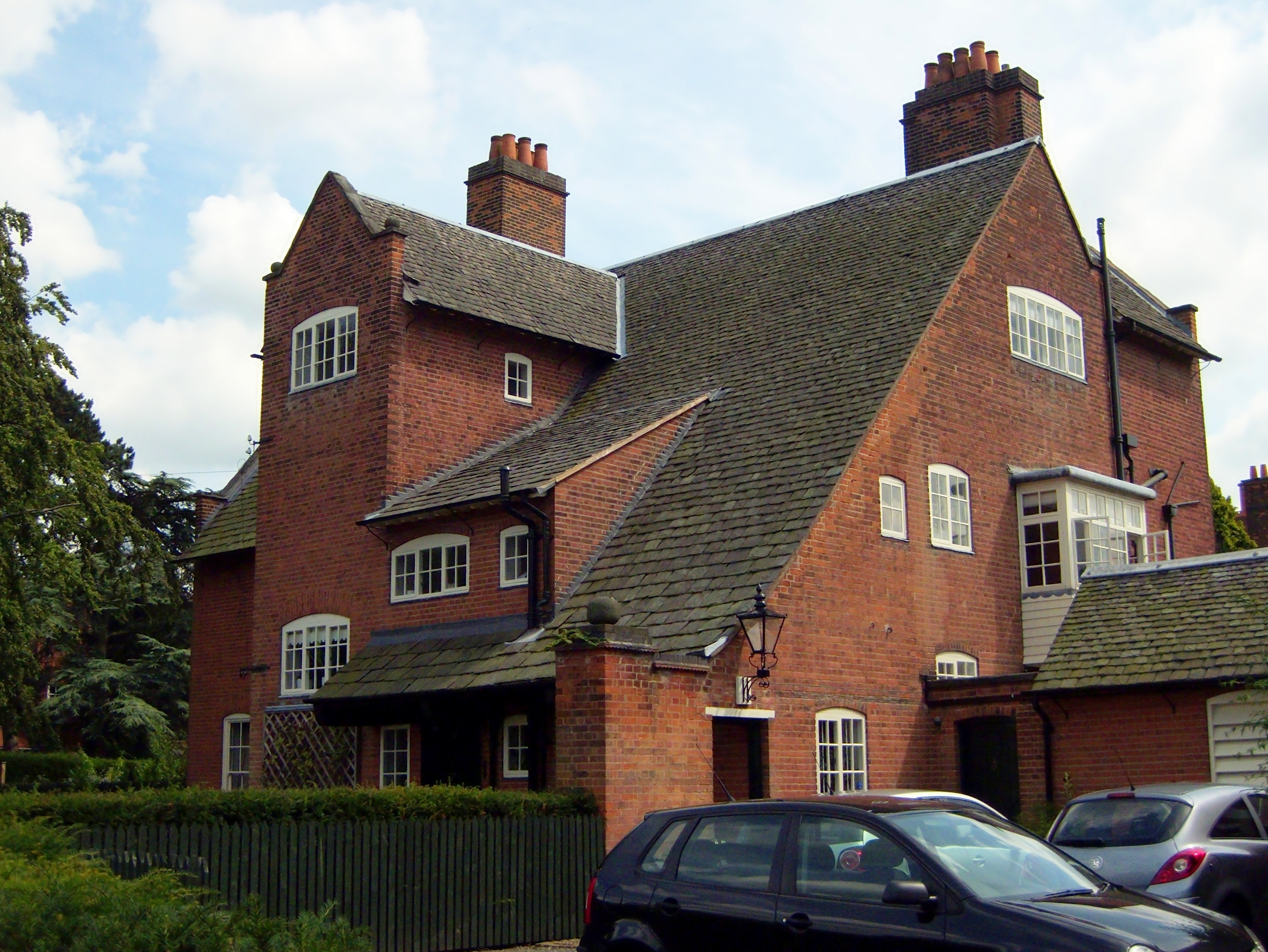
Inglewood (1892), Ratcliffe Road, Leicester

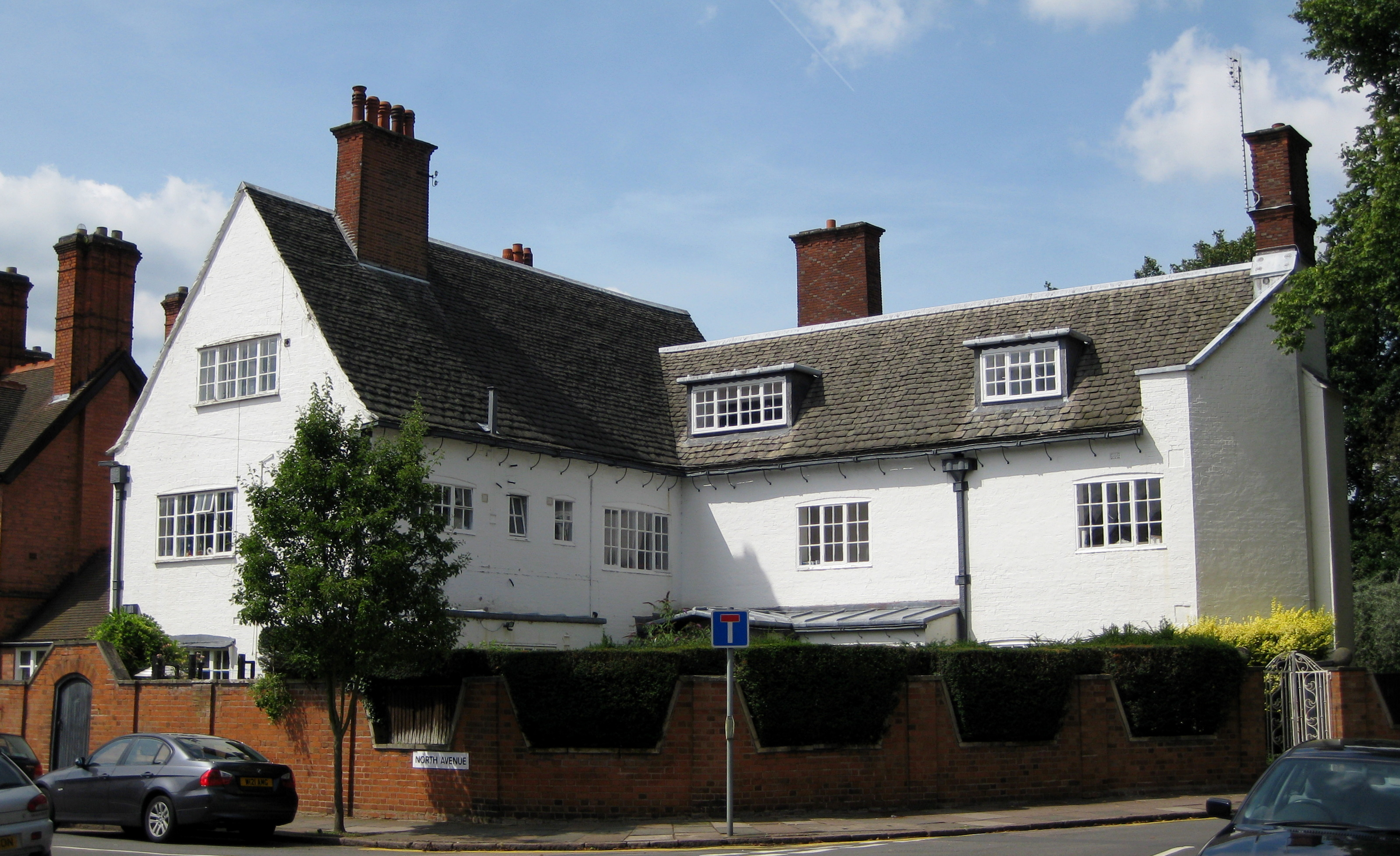
The White House (1898), North Avenue, Leicester

Gimson designed many buildings in the UK, the two most notable being his first new house commission, Inglewood in Leicester, and the National Trust property in Leicestershire called Stoneywell. Both are now Grade II* Listed in recognition of their architectural importance. His architectural commissions include:

Inglewood
(1892) Gimson purchased the land in the prosperous Leicester suburb of Stoneygate in October 1892 for a new house that he named Inglewood. This, his first work of purpose-built architecture, was intended as an expression and an advertisement of his new approach to architecture. A four-bedroomed house with two reception rooms, it has been described as one of the finest expressions of Arts and Craft residential design of its era. The interior was decorated with his own plasterwork and Morris and Company wallpapers.
The White House
(1898) Located around a mile to the north of Inglewood, this new house was designed by Gimson for his half-brother Arthur around 6 years after he completed the other property. The property was made a Grade II Listed Building in 1975.
Lea, Stoneywell and Rockyfield Cottages
in Ulverscroft, Charnwood Forest, Leicestershire (with Detmar Blow in 1897/9; Rockyfield 1909), all as summer retreats for his siblings. In February 2013 the National Trust bought Stoneywell; it opened to the public in February 2015;
The Leasowes
his own cottage, at Sapperton (1903, with a thatched roof, since burnt);
alterations to Pinbury Park (with plasterwork) and Waterlane House
(1908), both in Gloucestershire;
Kelmscott
cottages and the village hall (completed under Norman Jewson in 1933), Oxfordshire;
Coxen
at Budleigh Salterton, Devon, constructed in cob; the work was done a year or two before the war. This is Gimson's own description of the manner of its building: "The cob was made of the stiff sand found on the site; this was mixed with water and a great quantity of long wheat straw trodden into it. The walls were built 3 ft. thick, pared down to 2 ft. 6 in., and were placed on a plinth standing 18 in. above the ground floor, and built of cobble stones found among the sand. The walls were given a coat of plaster and a coat of rough-cast, which was gently trowelled over to smooth the surface slightly. I believe eight men were engaged on the cobwork, some preparing the material, and others treading in on to the top of the walls. It took them about three months to reach the wall plate; the cost was 6s. a cubic yard, exclusive of the plastering. No centring was used. The joists rested on plates, and above them the walls were reduced to 2 ft. 2 in. in thickness to leave the ends of the joists free. The beams also rested on wide plates and the ends were built round with stone, leaving space for ventilation. Tile or slate lintels were used over all openings. The cost of the whole house was 6½d. a cubic foot. Building with cob is soon learnt—of the eight men, only one of them had had any previous experience, and, I believe, he had not built with it for thirty years. This is the only house I have built of cob".
Whaplode Church window
Lincolnshire.
Bedales
His last major project was the Memorial Library (1918–1919) built next to the 1911 Lupton Hall (also a Gimson design) at Bedales School, near Petersfield, Hampshire (where his brother was a teacher) (built at his request by Geoffrey Lupton under Sidney Barnsley's supervision and completed in 1921).

Competition designs
In 1884 Gimson entered the National Competition for art students. His design for a suburban house was awarded a silver medal and described in The British Architect as 'very promising for the future of a designer who is only 18 years of age'. His competition 'Design for the Federal Capital of Australia' (1908) is an original project in town planning for the city which was to become Canberra. He also submitted a design for new offices for the Port of London Authority.

== Legacy ==
The Sapperton workshop was closed after Gimson's death, but many of the craftsmen went with Peter van der Waals to his new premises in Chalford.

His architectural style is "solid and lasting as the pyramids… yet gracious and homelike" (H. Wilson, 1899). Lethaby described him as an idealist individualist: "Work not words, things not designs, life not rewards were his aims." Norman Jewson was his foremost student, who carried his design principles into the next generation and described his studio practices in his classic memoir By Chance I did Rove (1951).

Today his furniture and craft work is regarded as a supreme achievement of its period and is well represented in the principal collections of the decorative arts in Britain and the United States of America. Specialist collections of his work may be seen in England at the Leicester Museum & Art Gallery, and in Gloucestershire at the Cheltenham Art Gallery and Museum, Rodmarton Manor and Owlpen Manor.

His rush-seated chair designs are still being made today by Lawrence Neal within a village craft in Stockton, Warwickshire. Lawrence learned to make chairs from his father, Neville Neal, who in turn learned from Edward Gardiner, Ernest Gimson's apprentice.

Former apprentices of Lawrence Neal, Richard Platt and Sam Cooper, have also opened up The Marchmont Workshop and continue to produce a range of Gimson designed and inspired chairs and tables using the original patterns and tools passed down from master to apprentice.

== Sources ==
- Carruthers, Annette, Mary Greensted, and Barley Roscoe (1980). Ernest Gimson: Arts & Crafts Designer and Architect. New Haven, CT: Yale University Press, 2019. ISBN 978-0-300-24626-1.
- Comino, Mary (1980). Gimson and the Barnsleys: 'Wonderful furniture of a commonplace kind'. London: Evans Brothers Limited. ISBN 0237448955.
- Nicholas Mander, Owlpen Manor, Gloucestershire: a short history and guide (Owlpen Press, current edition, 2006) OCLC 57576417 ISBN 0-9546056-1-6
- W.R. Lethaby, F.L. Griggs & Alfred Powell, Ernest Gimson, his life and work (1924)
- Norman Jewson, By Chance I did Rove (Cirencester, 1951 (reprinted))
