= Sisters of Marie-Auxiliatrice =

The Sisters of Marie-Auxiliatrice (French: Sœurs de Marie-Auxiliatrice; Latin: Societas Mariae Auxiliatricis; abbreviation: M.A.) is a religious institute of pontifical right whose members profess public vows of chastity, poverty, and obedience and follow the evangelical way of life in common.

They dedicate themselves to a lot of forms of activity, especially in favor of young people and the poor.

This religious institute was founded in Toulouse, France, in 1864, by bd. Sophie-Thérèse de Soubiran La Louvière, who assumed the name of mother Marie-Thérèse, with the collaboration of Jesuit father Paul Ginhac. The institute received pontifical status in 1868.

The sisters have houses in Cameroon, France, Ireland, Italy, Japan, Micronesia, Philippines, South Korea and the United Kingdom. The Generalate of the Congregation can be found in Paris, France.

On 31 December 2005 there are 204 sisters in 28 communities.
