= Norman Jewson =

English architect-craftsman

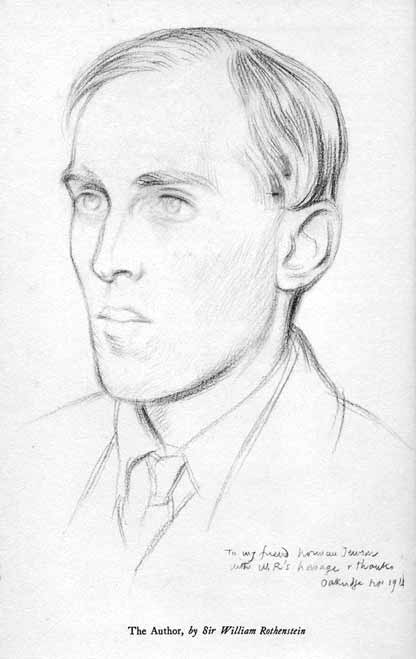
- Norman Jewson, pencil drawing by Sir William Rothenstein, 1911
- Born: 12 February 1884; Norwich, Norfolk, England
- Died: 28 August 1975 (aged 91); Sapperton, England
- Occupation: Architect
- Buildings: Aycote House
- Projects: Owlpen Manor; Campden House

Norman Jewson (12 February 1884 – 28 August 1975) was an English architect-craftsman of the Arts and Crafts movement, who practised in the Cotswolds. He was a distinguished, younger member of the group which had settled in Sapperton, Gloucestershire, a village in rural southwest England, under the influence of Ernest Gimson. Surviving into old age, he brought their ideas and working methods into the second half of the twentieth century. His book of reminiscences has become established as a minor classic of the English Arts and Crafts movement. His repair of the Tudor Owlpen Manor in 1925–26 is often regarded as his most representative and successful work.

== Early career ==
Jewson was born in 1884 of a family of the long-established Jewson timber merchants in Norwich, Norfolk, who were a locally prominent Baptist family involved in public service in East Anglia. His elder brother was Percy Jewson, Lord Mayor of Norwich 1934-35 and National Liberal MP for Great Yarmouth 1941–45, his first cousin was Dorothy Jewson, a Labour MP and suffragist, and his nephew was Charles Jewson, Lord Mayor of Norwich.

He spent all his early life in East Anglia, where he was educated in Lowestoft, before going up to Gonville and Caius College, Cambridge, where he rowed in the College eight. He served his articles in the architectural practice of his cousin, Herbert [Bertie] Ibberson in London, which he 'disliked as a place to live in permanently the longer [he] stayed there'. Ibberson had worked in the same office as Gimson, Ernest Barnsley and Alfred Hoare Powell under J. D. Sedding, in the 'crafted Gothic' tradition, with a love of handicraft. Like William Morris, Philip Webb and Norman Shaw, Sedding had been a pupil of George Edmund Street.

Jewson describes, in his autobiographical reminiscences, By Chance I did Rove (1951), how, having finished his apprenticeship in 1907, he set out with a donkey and trap on a sketching tour in the Cotswolds, 'a part of the country little known at that time'. He had no idea that he would stay there for the rest of his life.

Ibberson had recommended him to visit the workshops of Ernest Gimson, who soon took him on as an 'improver', or unpaid assistant and put him to work at making sketches from life and studying the crafts of modelled plasterwork, woodcarving and design for metalwork.

For Gimson, architecture and the crafts were vitally interdependent. He describes how, as part of his training under Gimson, he was encouraged to draw a different wild flower every day from nature, noting its essential characteristics and adapting it to a formal pattern suitable for modelled plasterwork, wood-carving or needlework.

Jewson soon became an invaluable member of the group, and a pupil, friend and close companion of Gimson in his later years. In 1911 he married Ernest Barnsley's daughter, Mary (1889–1966), and converted for himself a group of cottages at Bachelor's Court in Sapperton.

He supervised much of Gimson's architectural and repair work. He writes that he admired in Gimson an assured distinction, traditional in the use of the best craftsmanship and materials, where in design grace of form was combined with simplicity; these are the qualities of his own best architectural work. He set up in practice on his own in 1919 and soon gained a reputation for the sympathetic conservation and adaptation of old buildings. His credo was clear:

My own buildings I wanted to have the basic qualities of the best old houses of their locality, built in the local traditional way in the local materials, but not copying the details which properly belonged to the period in which they were built… I hoped that my buildings would at least have good manners and be able to take their natural place in their surroundings without offence.

== Architectural work ==
He worked confidently in a classical idiom in his country houses, when necessity or the spirit of place demanded it, as Norman Shaw, Edwin Lutyens and, in the Cotswolds, Guy Dawber had done. The Lindens, Norwich (1921), and The Garden House, Westonbirt, are some of his most successful essays in a whimsical, vernacular classicism, with characteristically fine plasterwork detail and restrained use of mouldings. He travelled whenever he could in Italy, making sketches of architectural details, lettering, farm carts, landscapes and village scenes. Many of these are now at Owlpen Manor in Gloucestershire.

Jewson always had either pencil or chisel in his hand. He was involved in the simple craft processes of building, familiarizing himself with the qualities of tested materials, tools and techniques, and reviving the fabrics, textures and disciplines of traditional construction, from drystone walling in the Cotswolds, and cob. He used some of these processes in design and construction of a summer house at Lane End, Kilve, in the Quantock Hills and in the twisted gut in a weather-clock set above a row of simple almshouses.

He worked for a time with William Weir, an architect who was skilled in the repair of old buildings and churches, such as Salle, in Norfolk, on behalf of the Society for the Protection of Ancient Buildings, and The Priest's House at Muchelney. He also assisted Ernest Barnsley, supervising the completion of Rodmarton Manor when Barnsley died in 1925, most notably the chapel (1929). Rodmarton was Ernest Barnsley's most important work; 'probably', Jewson wrote, 'the last house of its size to be built in the old leisurely way, with all its timber grown from local woods, sawn on the pit and seasoned before use.'

In 1925, he purchased Owlpen Manor, whose repair is often considered his outstanding work. His other major architectural repair work was at Campden House (formerly Combe House) outside Chipping Campden, where he demolished some untidy Victorian additions and domestic offices, unifying with the skilled use of detail and materials a cluttered design of various dates to form a pleasing and comfortable house, with terraced garden and summerhouse.

He became established as a well-known 'gentleman's architect' in the Cotswolds between the Wars, working on a number of distinguished Cotswold manor houses and farmhouses (listed below), and adapting historic buildings to modern uses.

He executed church repair work (Chalford, near Stroud, was re-ordered by him), and designs for memorials, inscriptions, headstones, and lettering; also for metalwork, as Gimson had done, including sconces, chimney furniture and gates, and architectural leadwork.

He also worked on the woodcarving of details such as finials and newels for his houses. A number of his furniture designs were successful, from the piano-case with marquetry inlay, made by Waals, which he designed for Mrs Clegg of Wormington Grange, to the child's chair with back splats showing carvings of village characters which he made and painted himself, as well as a number of toys for his daughters.

== Principal works ==
- Aycote House, Rendcomb (new house, for I. Naylor, 1931)
- Alvescote Lodge, Oxfordshire (1923)
- Bachelor's Court, Sapperton (alterations, for himself)
- Battledown Manor, Cheltenham (cottage and garden house and pool; gates)
- Oakfield House, Battledown
- Box (new house, 1928)
- Campden House, near Chipping Campden (alterations and repairs, demolition of chapel and S wing, 1928–34)
- Charlton Park (new house, 1931)
- Chipping Campden (house for Ben Chandler)
- Christ Church, Chalford, near Stroud (reordering and furnishings, including lectern, screen, panelling, font, c. 1934–7)
- Charlton Abbots, near Andoversford (manor house, alterations)
- Chedworth (The Orchard, for Mr Levey)
- Chipping Campden (The Old Plough; Old Kings Arms [with sign by Griggs]; Studio; St James's Church [communion rails, altar, screens, panelling, 1945–58])
- Coates, Cirencester (two houses: Fosse Hill, for F.B. Swanwick, c. 1923, and The Setts House, for A. McKillop, c. 1924)
- Cirencester (almshouses in Barton Lane, 1929; Bowley almshouses in Watermoor Road, 1927); Greywalls [today Hunters], 1927; Barclays Bank, 1923)
- Climperwell (house and granary, 1930)
- Cotswold Farm (with his most extensive garden, on a hillside; plasterwork; for Major Birchall, c. 1926)
- Doughton Manor, near Tetbury (repairs for Col. F.A. Mitchell, 1933)
- Dumbleton (war memorial, 1921)
- Down Ampney (cottages, alterations)
- Elkstone (Pike Cottage, alterations)
- Foxcote (house and cottage, 1929)
- Frome Top, Minchinhampton, 1923 (Grade II Listed)
- Garden House, Westonbirt (new house and cottage for Capt Guy Hanmer, 1939–40)
- Glenfall House (for Arthur Mitchell, also a patron of both Waals and Griggs)
- Greenway Farm, near Cheltenham (alterations)
- Hidcote House (repairs, 1924–5)
- Hill Court, near Berkeley (vase urns)
- Kelmscott, Lechlade (completion of Morris memorial cottages and village hall, 1933)
- Iles Farm and cottage, Far Oakridge (for Sir William Rothenstein)
- Lane End, Kilve, Somerset (cottage for himself); also Rowditch, in Kilve)
- Lechlade, St Lawrence's Church (communion rails)
- The Lindens, Eaton, Norwich (drawing room, plasterwork, for his mother, 1921)
- Llysgennydd, St David's, Pembrokeshire (for Kenneth Pringle)
- Little Wolford Manor, Shipston-on-Stour, Warwickshire
- Nutbeam Farm, Duntisbourne Leer
- Owlpen Manor, near Uley
- Painswick Lodge (completion of Ernest Barnsley's plans, cottage and gardens, 1925–33)
- Painswick (cottage for Mrs Seddon, 1920)
- Poulton Grange (1929)
- Ready Token, Poulton, Gloucestershire (house to butterfly plan, 1928–9)
- Redmarley D'Abitot (Down House)
- Rodmarton Manor (chapel and leadwork) (completion of project)
- Salle Church, Norfolk (seating)
- Silver Road Baptist Church, Norwich (1910)
- Shipton Oliffe Manor, Andoversford(alterations to manor house; cottages and stables)
- Siddington (reading room and cottage)
- Souldern, Oxfordshire (gateway to church)
- South Cerney (cottages)
- Southrop Manor, Lechlade (alterations and plasterwork, 1926 and 1932–9)
- Swalecliffe, Oxfordshire (alterations to cottages and park, 1937)
- Sydenhams Farm, Bisley
- Througham Court, Bisley (house repairs and garden landscaping for the novelist Michael Sadleir, 1929)
- Througham Slad (large NE wing converted for William Cadbury, 1931)
- Warren's Gorse, Daglingworth (1922)
- Westington (alterations for the illustrator, graphic designer and stained glass artist Paul Woodroffe, 1925)
- Weston-sub-Edge (lych gate, 1922)
- Woeful Dane, Minchinhampton
- Wormington Grange (west garden, ?Ionic loggia, gates, repairs, works to Old Rectory and Grange Farm, for Mrs Henry Gordon Clegg (née Maud Field, 1872-1933), before 1933).

== Legacy ==
Jewson wrote two books: By Chance I did Rove and The Little Book of Architecture. By Chance I did Rove is recognised as a minor classic of the background to the Gimson group and Cotswold life before the First World War, appearing in three editions.The Little Book of Architecture (1940; reprinted) is a beginner's guide to English architectural styles.

He also wrote a number of poems, illustrated for his friends, and would declaim a Victorian peep show in a whining, sing-song drone.

He did little professional work after 1940. He felt increasingly at odds with modernism and the historical-artistic developments of the post-war period.

He died suddenly at his house in Sapperton in 1975, aged 91.

The art historian David Gould wrote this account following Jewson's death:

His architectural work has a dignity and simplicity in keeping with the traditional Cotswold manner. His buildings look as if they had grown naturally from the ground. He was equally skilled and sym-pathetic in the restoration of old houses, the most notable of which is the romantic and unique gabled manor house of Owlpen, in the Cotswolds, which he bought in a dilapidated condition in [1925] and restored at his own cost and, alas, ultimate loss. His friend F.L. Griggs, RA, inscribed and dedicated his etching of Owlpen (1930) to him.

== See also ==
- Owlpen Manor
