= Ulverscroft Nature Reserve =

Nature reserve near Markfield, Leicestershire, England

Coordinates: 52.707°N 1.276°W

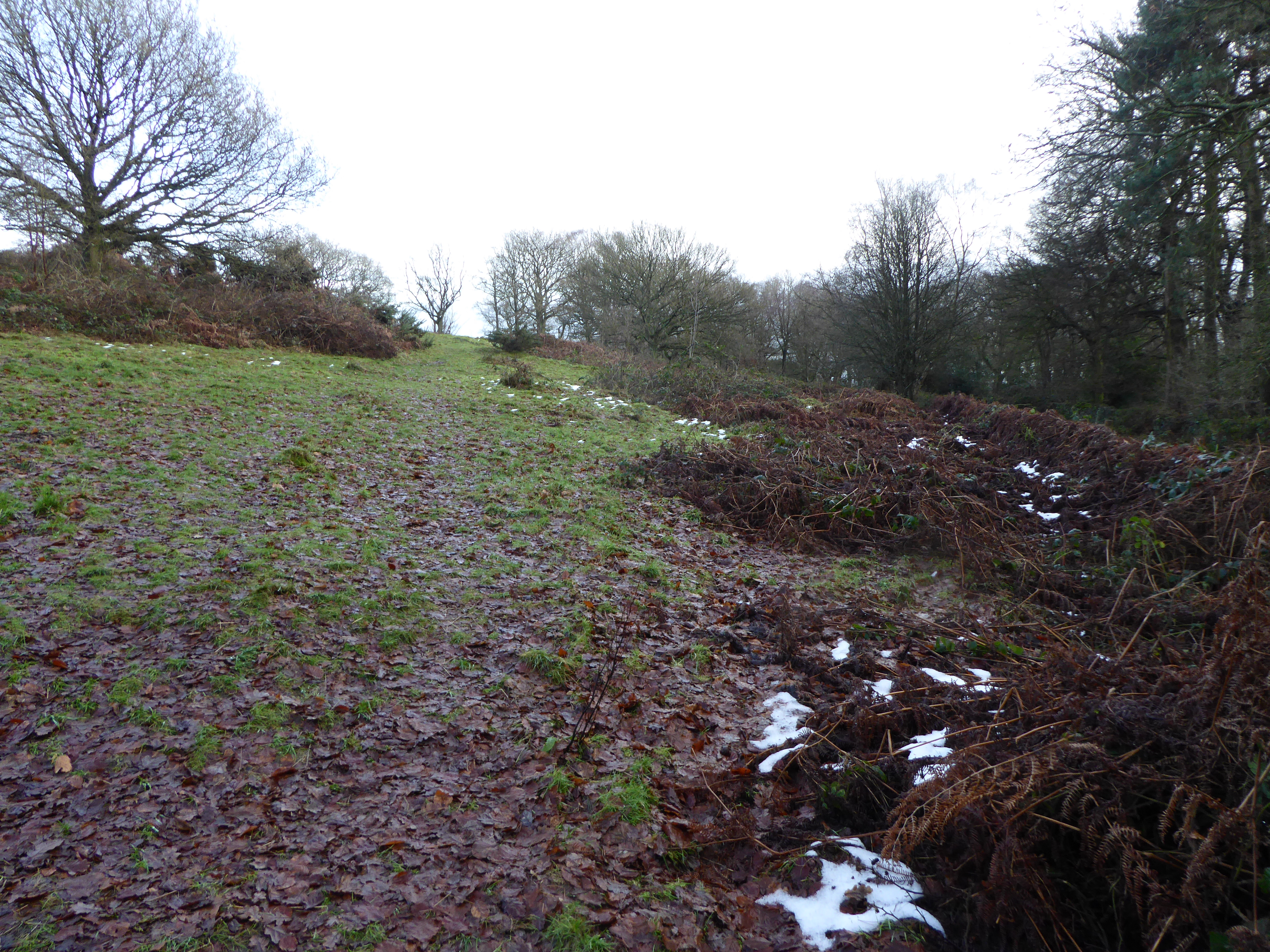
- Interactive map of Ulverscroft Nature Reserve
- Type: Nature reserve
- Location: Markfield, Leicestershire
- OS grid: SK 490124
- Area: 56 hectares (140 acres)
- Manager: Leicestershire and Rutland Wildlife Trust

Ulverscroft is a 56-hectare (140-acre) nature reserve north of Markfield in Leicestershire, England. It is managed by the Leicestershire and Rutland Wildlife Trust, which shares its ownership with the National Trust. The site is partly in Ulverscroft Valley, which is a Site of Special Scientific Interest.

The site's diverse habitats include woodland, heath, wet grassland, a pond, a meadow, marshes and sphagnum bog. The meadow has a rich flora, including fragrant orchid, devil's-bit scabious and bitter vetch.

There is access from Whitcrofts Lane.
