= Ulverscroft Valley =

Site of Special Scientific Interest in Leicestershire

Coordinates: 52.709°N 1.273°W

- Site of Special Scientific Interest
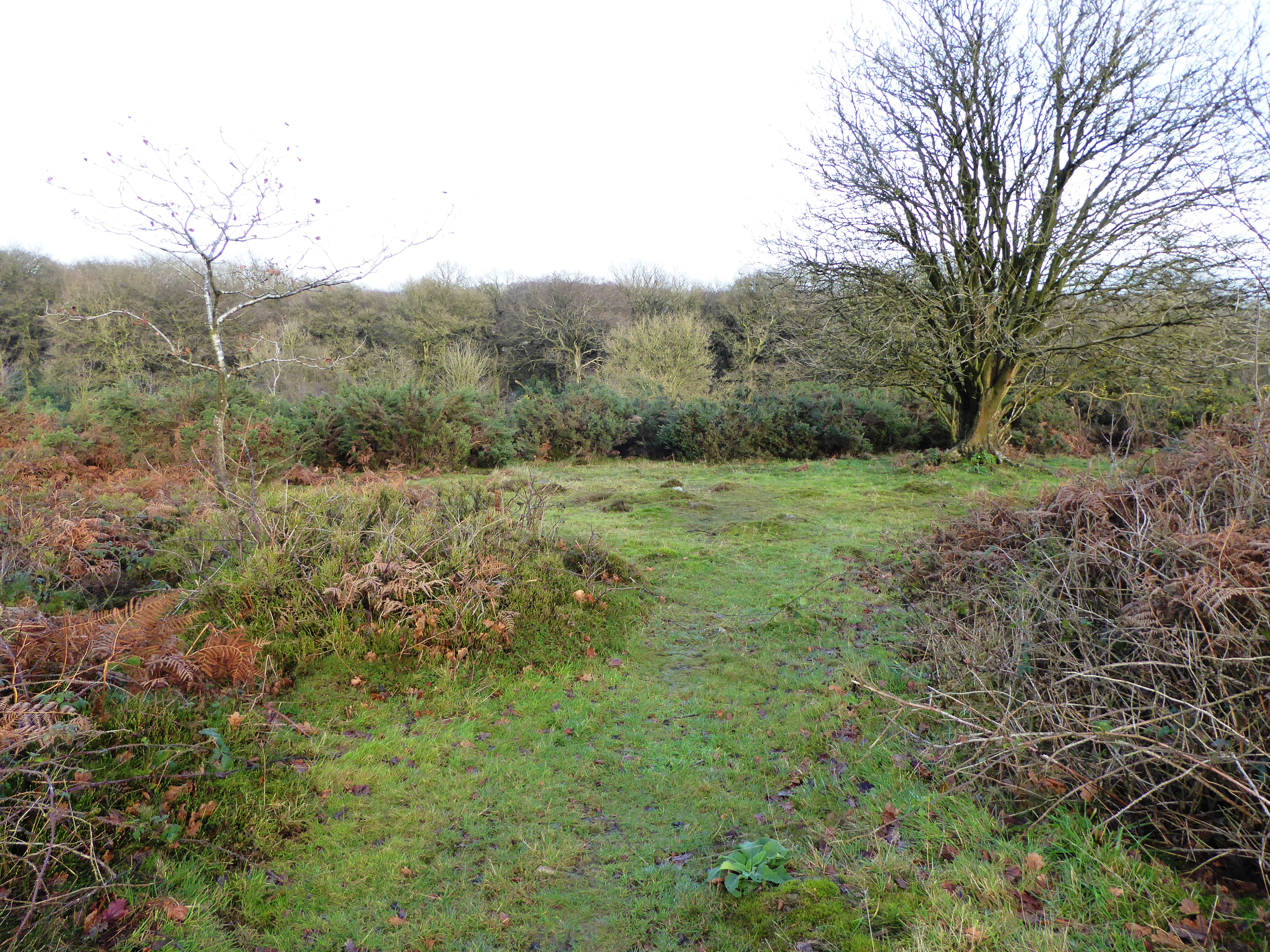
- Ulverscroft Nature Reserve
- Location of Ulverscroft Valley.
- Area of search: Leicestershire
- Grid reference: SK 497 123
- Interest: Biological
- Area: 110.8 hectares (274 acres)
- Notification date: 1984
- Location map: Magic Map

Ulverscroft Valley is a 110.8-hectare (274-acre) biological Site of Special Scientific Interest north-west of Markfield in Leicestershire. The site is in five separate blocks, and two areas are nature reserves managed by the Leicestershire and Rutland Wildlife Trust (LRWT). Lea Meadows is owned by the LRWT and it is also a scheduled monument. Part of Ulverscroft Nature Reserve is owned by the LRWT and part is owned by the National Trust and leased to the LRWT.

== SSSI ==
The Ulverscroft Valley was designated as a Site of Special Scientific Interest (SSSI) under Section 28 of the Wildlife and Countryside Act 1981. It is described by Natural England as being one of the best wildlife sites in the county, with grassland, heath, woodland and wetlands. Over 200 plant species have been recorded on the site, with an especially rich flora in wet areas. The nature reserves are open to the public, but others parts are private land with no public access.

The drier habitats are dominated by sweet vernal grass, crested dog's-tail and fescues; the fragrant orchid and flea sedge, both rarities in the county, grow here. Wetter areas support a rich flora with 13 species of sedge, including bottle sedge, another county rarity, as well as heath spotted-orchid, marsh violet and marsh arrow grass, quaking-grass, and the uncommon Adder's-tongue fern.

The acidic marshy grassland is covered by a mixture of purple moor-grass, tufted hair-grass, rushes and sedges, with patches of heather and bilberry and spikes of meadow thistle. There are areas of unspoilt sessile oak woodland which have an understorey of sallow, European gorse and western gorse. Breeding birds in the woodland include woodcock and snipe, and occasionally western yellow wagtail and common redstart.
