= Barnsley brothers =

Ernest (born Arthur Ernest Barnsley, 1863–1926) and Sidney Howard Barnsley (25 February 1865 – 25 September 1926) were Arts and Crafts movement master builders, furniture designers and makers associated with Ernest Gimson. In the early 20th century they had workshops at Sapperton, Gloucestershire, where both brothers are buried in the churchyard of St. Kenelm's Church.

Sidney's son Edward continued the family tradition, making fine furniture according to his father's philosophy, and became a figurehead in his own right.

They were also associated with the designers and makers Gordon Russell, the Dutch furniture designer-craftsman Peter Waals, or van der Waals, the architect-designer Norman Jewson (who was Ernest Barnsley's son-in-law) and the architect Robert Weir Schultz. Sidney became involved as a founder of the short lived Kenton & Co. furniture business along with Sir Mervyn MacCartney, Reginald Blomfield, William Lethaby, Ernest Gimson, Stephen Webb and Colonel Harold Esdaile Malet.

== Church at Lower Kingswood ==
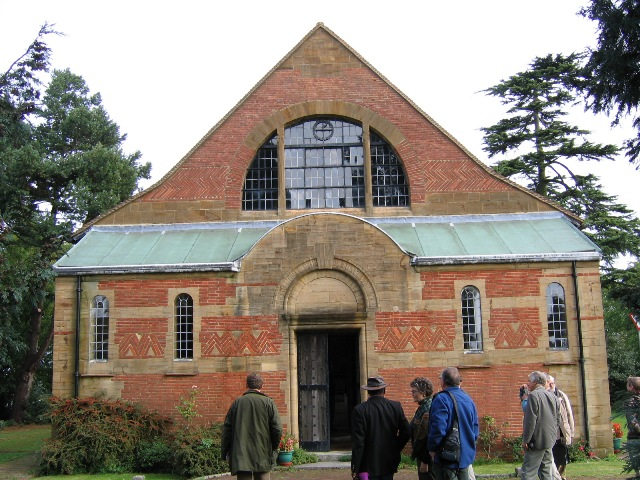
Lower Kingswood Church of Jesus Christ and the Wisdom of God

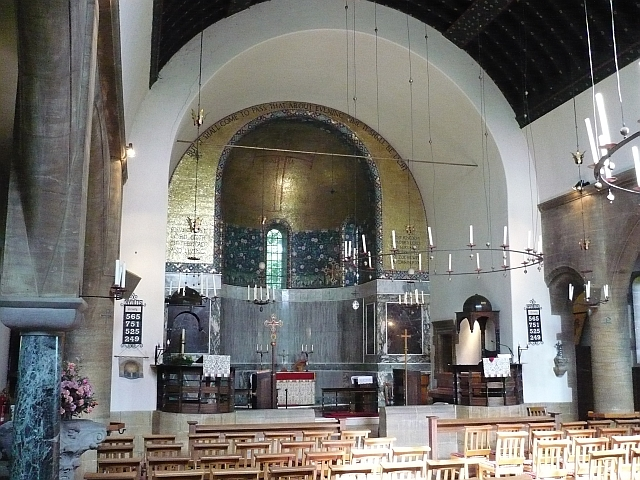
Interior showing chancel section of above church

Sidney Barnsley rebuilt the Church of Jesus Christ and the Wisdom of God at Lower Kingswood, Surrey, in 1891 in the free Byzantine style. He used red brick and stone in various patterns, e.g. chequer work, herringbone and basketweave, and a plain tile roof. He installed a single-unit aisled nave and chancel; an east end with polygonal apses, the outer ones as angled bay windows; an imposing west front; a large planked and studded door with scalloped metal framing under a round arch with inscription; a stone-dressed diocletian window above the narthex under a pent roof; and round-headed lancet windows on other façades and in the apses of the east end. Interior features include an Arts and Crafts movement lectern, pulpit and reading desk, in ebony and holly with mother of pearl inlay; priests' chairs with domed canopies; and Byzantine capitals from Constantinople and Ephesus decorating the aisles and west wall.

It has the highest listed building classification, of Grade I.

== Rodmarton Manor ==
Starting in 1909, the brothers collaborated in the design, construction and furnishing of Rodmarton Manor, a work completed by Ernest's son-in-law, Norman Jewson.

== House at Hagley Road, Birmingham ==
In January 2011, controversy arose over the granting by Birmingham City Council of permission to the Extra Care Charitable Trust to demolish 324 Hagley Road (52.4732°N 1.9609°W), built in 1895, and the last surviving house by Ernest Barnsley in that city. Although not listed, the building and others affected lie within the Barnsley Road Conservation Area. The Victorian Society wrote to the Government Office for the West Midlands to request that the Secretary of State call in for his own determination the application to build a retirement village of 240 flats on the site, in Edgbaston. However, the project went ahead and the house was demolished with several others in late 2011.

Barnsley Road is named after Ernest.

== Other ==
Both Ernest and Sidney attended classes at Birmingham School of Art before going to London to finish training. Sidney attended the Royal Academy's School of Architecture for two years and during this time he met Robert Weir Schultz, with whom he travelled to the Near East, Italy and Greece. They became affiliated to the British School at Athens and produced hundreds of drawings and photographs of ancient monuments that they had systematically investigated. Their work served as the foundation for "a collection of roughly 1500 drawings and 1000 photographs of the most important Byzantine monuments of the Mediterranean basin, Italy, Turkey, Greece, as well as Asia Minor and the Near East, dating between 1888 and 1949." The collection, which is today housed at the British School at Athens, is known as the Byzantine Research Fund Archive…”.

The Warburg Institute also has a large collection of photographs by Weir Schultz and Barnsley. In the Annual Report of 2004–2005 for the School of Advanced Study, University of London, it was reported that a large number of glass negatives of Byzantine churches held since the 1940s had been identified as being taken by Robert Weir Schultz and Sidney Barnsley in 1889 and 1890. Their importance is highlighted by the statement “The negatives, which have now been printed, were long thought by Byzantinists to be lost. They provide important evidence about the state of various Greek churches before radical restoration, or in one case before destruction by fire." In addition, photographs by Weir Schultz and Sidney Barnsley, known as the Weir Schultz and Barnsley Collection, are held in the archive of the Conway Library at The Courtauld Institute of Art, London.

Drawings by Sidney are also held in the collections of the Victoria and Albert Museum, London.
