= Lessore =

Lessore is a surname. Notable people with the surname include:

- Ada Louise Powell née Lessore (1882–1956), English designer and calligrapher
- Émile Lessore (1805–1876), French ceramic artist and painter
- Helen Lessore (1907–1994), English gallerist
- Nathanael Lessore (born 1990), English author
- Thérèse Lessore (1884–1945), English artist
