= List of exhibitions at Woodlands Art Gallery =

List of art exhibitions at gallery in Greenwich, London

This list of exhibitions at Woodlands Art Gallery details exhibitions held at the Woodlands Art Gallery (Woodlands House) in the Westcombe Park area of Greenwich, southeast London between 1972 and 2003.

The house was acquired by the Royal Borough of Greenwich in 1967 and opened as a local history library and contemporary art gallery — known as Woodlands Art Gallery — in 1972, and held an extensive range of solo and group exhibitions.

== Exhibitions 1970s ==
Dates	Title	Artist(s)
1 – 25 July 1972	Blackheath Art Society 1947–1972: A Retrospective Exhibition arranged by Greenwich Libraries for the Greenwich Festival 1972	
19 July – 21 August 1973	Space from the Quadrangle	Philippa Beale; Joan Burr; Gerry Hunt; Kay Hunt; Lawrence Preece; Susan Tebby
27 October to 25 November 1973	Graphothek Berlin	Peter Ackerman; Horst Antes; Andreas Bindl; Rudolf Calsow; Otto Eglan; Volkmar Haase; Hannah Hoch; Rudolf Kugler; Imre Kocsis; Siegfried Kuhl; Wolfgang Kunde; Jean Leppien; Roger Loewig; Heinrich Graf von Lückner; Karl Opperman; Heinz Otterson; Wolfgang Petrick; Heinrich Richter; Peter Sorge; Friedrich Seidel-Fichert; Arnulf Spengler; Helmut Thoma; Günther Uecker; Gerd Winner; Hans Joachim Ziedler; Max Seevogt
1974	John Julius Angerstein and Woodlands, 1774–1974 : a bicentenary exhibition celebrating the building of Woodlands by John Julius Angerstein	
15 June - 14 July 1974	Art from the Institutes (Pictures and Sculpture)	Pictures from Eltham Institute: Natalie BALL; Edna BATTERBY; Muriel BINGHAM; Ken BLAKE; John BUTLER; James CLARY; R W COLLINS; Susan DOUGHTY; Daphne DUNK; Richard GOSS; D J V HARRIS; H HEWITT; Sonia KING; David LEWIS; Eileen LIDGARD; M MORRIS; Marion SMITH; W G STUBBS; Cynthia TANTON; Sandra THOMPSON; R T VIPOND; S WEAVER; Sculpture from Eltham Institute: J H J BARNSHAW; G A BECK; A C BOXALL; Peter BROWN; Gary CLAYTON; Robert HOARE; Margaret MOUNTFORD; Eva WILLIAMS; Sheila WISDOM; Pictures from Greenwich Institute: Ann BOIVIN; S BREARLEY; John BRYANT; Gillian BUDD; Kinnie CALO; Gladys CHARMAN; Noel G CLARK; - - COLEMAN; Cyril COOKE; B FRYATT; Jean GIBSON; Isabel HESELTINE; Lesley HILL; Doris LITTLE; A M MCCLEERY; Eve McKENZIE; Hugh McKENZIE; Marjorie MANSBRIDGE; Ida PETTY; E SHIELDS; R F TWIST; W WEIMER; Sculpture from Greenwich Institute: Catherine ARMSTRONG; Kinny CALO; Cyril COOKE; Sonia KING; - - PEARCE; Rona RUMNEY; Myfanwy SHRAPNEL; Clive WATSON; Pictures from Woolwich Institute: Jess ARNOLD; Elise ATKINSON; Iris BANKS; Peggy BASSETT; W A BRIDDES; Marjorie CARTLEDGE; Margaret COOPER; A L DUDLEY; Pat HODGKINS; Pat HODGKINS; Patricia HUDGINS; Doris IEVERS; A KIRK; Kennedy Lillian MAY; Christine MOYSE; E A MOYSE; Daniel MURPHY; Dave OATRIDGE; Sylvia PHILLIPS; Joan PINFOLD; V E RANDALL; F C SCOVELL; Vanessa TINKER; Eric WEBB; Wendy WOOLDRIDGE; Doris YEARSLEY; Sculpture from Woolwich Institute: Muriel BAILY; F BEAUMONT; Margaret BRACEGIRDLE; G H COOPER; John EHMANN; G EPPS; Henry GILRONAN; Keith HAWORTH; Wendy KAYE; P D LENGTHORN; B A MILLEDGE; P PIPER; Brian PITCHER; Maureen RICHARDSON; H SMITHSON; Shirley WOOLLARD
18 July – 6 August 1974	Four artists from Kent	Dorothy Fairweather-Walker; Julia Easterling; Brian Hargreaves; Joyce Hargreaves
4 January to 2 February 1975	Watercolours from 1840 to 1914 of places in the Borough of Greenwich	
6 February – 4 March 1975	Crafts from the Institutes	
23 August – 23 September 1975	Drawings	Siegfried Kühl
10 January – 10 February 1976	Victorian Street Scenes: Mr Coulthurst's Salford, 1889–1894, Mr Spurgeon's Greenwich, 1884–1887 (a Magic Lantern Lecture): An Exhibition of Photographs	
14 February - 14 March 1976	Valentines: Greetings Cards	
20 March - 2 May 1976	Design Review (V&A)	
6 May – 1 June 1976	Mary Rhodes and her embroiderers and Tapestry Weavers	Mary Rhodes
5 – 27 June 1976	Paintings and Drawings	Jean Cooke; Diana Cumming
9 October – 9 November 1976	Paintings	Ian McGugan; Ed Perera
13 November – 14 December 1976	Paintings, drawings and prints	Frederick Palmer; Max Middleton
18 December 1976 – 18 January 1977	Watercolours and drawings of places in the Borough of Greenwich	Llwyd Roberts
3 April – 1 May 1977	Postcards	Collection of Richard Moy
11 June – 12 July 1977	Women's International Art Club	
12 January – 14 February 1978	Exhibition	Clem Beer; Roger Butlin
29 April – 6 June	Retrospective exhibition of watercolours and drawings 1952–1978	Gordon Gunn
1978	Solo Show	Cristiana Angelini
15 July – 22 August 1978	Sculptures and Drawings	Kinnie Calo
15 July – 22 August 1978	Collage, Pictures and Sculptures	Myfanwy Shrapnel
26 August – 26 September 1978	Textiles, Wall Hangings and pottery	
30 September – 31 October 1978	Pottery and Weaving	WOVEN TEXTILES FROM GREENWICH INSTITUTE: Mary Alder; Rosemary Apteb; Sharon Blay; Gillian Boorman; Elizabeth Bourne; Grace Bowen; Millie Caverley; Joan Chamberlain; Julie Collins; Julie Crawford; Ronnie Cross; Violet Day; Edith Anona Jane Farmer; Seldon Charles Forrester Farmer; Judith Filkins; Linda Foreman; Elaine Gerrity; Ann Goldman; Hazel Grayson; John Grayson; Jane Harcourt; Marybell Hargward; Chris Harvey; Pamela Haydon; Gillian Hearne; Rose Humphries; Doris Jenkins; Jane Jenkins; Richard Jolly; Eileen King; Maureen Kingston; Jo Llewellyn; Susan Marsh; Valerie Mendes; Ethel Moore; Peggy Nicholson; Win Oldridge; Gillian Perrin; Gladys Pugh; Gillian Price; Janice Pudelek; Hazel Rank; Ann Sofroniou; Marylin Ridge; Joy Slater; Elizabeth Thompson; Svbil Spink; Catherine de Sousa; Joy Turkiewiez; Ella Vollans; Susan Wieck; Winifred Wright
30 September – 31 October 1978	Pottery and Weaving	POTTERY FROM ELTHAM INSTITUTE: Joyce Adamson; Tessa Andrews; Brenda Taylor; Irene Barker; Jackie Barter; Frances Brunsell; Joan Butcher; Alan Dudley; Tony Duignan; Ann Fay; John Foley; Maureen Hawes; Linda McQuillen; Irmgard Marcer; Peter Nieto; Joan Randall; Betty Shadwell; Pamela Coe; Angela Hunt; Sue Trotman
30 September – 31 October 1978	Pottery and Weaving	POTTERY FROM GREENWICH INSTITUTE: A. ADAMS; J. ANNAND; P. ANNAND; J. Beagles; T. Beale; G. Budd; E Colqhoun; S Enderby; E Frester; M. Gocking; L. Gregson; L. Hall; Anne Hart; A. Hartley; K. Kaiser; A. Morgan; B. Rubie; M. Schofield; P. Stanbridge; K. Ward
30 September – 31 October 1978	Pottery and Weaving	POTTERY FROM WOOLWICH INSTITUTE: Jennie Adams; Tony Ashton; Jordon Vaviusun; Eileen Davies; Jan Dias; Jean Drostle; Neville Edwards; Colin Fifield; E. Godden; Miriam Gordon; Grace Gosling; Silvia Hogg; Jack Holmes; Nancy Lawrence; Faith Nicolaides; Maggie Page; Jean Paoras; Dorothy Perry; Elsie Rigby; Sandra Riley; Jan Ruddock; Beryl Searle; Sarla Shankar; Eileen Sloane; A. Sylvester; Elsie Wise; Doris Yearsley
4 November – 12 December 1978	Sculpture and Drawings	Ken Bright
16 December 1978 – 30 January 1979	Aladdin to Zinbad - an A to Z of Pantomime	PICTURES, pictorial illustrations and related material from the collection of David Drummond
1979	Memorial Exhibition	Bernard Adeney; Noël Gilford Adeney
15 December 1979 – 15 January 1980	Watercolours and Etchings	Maureen Black
15 December 1979 – 15 January 1980	Watercolour Drawings and Patterns	Rod Harman

== Exhibitions 1980s ==
Dates	Title	Artist(s)
19 January – 19 February 1980	Drawings and Prints	Julie Llewellyn
19 January – 19 February 1980	Paintings and Drawings	David Williams
23 February – 25 March 1980	Paintings Drawings and Fabric Collages	Richard Box
23 February – 25 March 1980	Paintings, Watercolours and Drawings 1968 – 1980	Norman Smith
29 March – 29 April 1980	Paintings	Tony Ashton
3 May – 10 June 1980	Figurative Painters	Joseph Dixon; Ken Ersser; Eileen Hogan; Robin Hull; Julian Minton; Terry O'Connor; Barrie Payne; Simon Pierse; Allanah Piesse; Jack Piesse; Michael Salaman; Terence Scales; Gordon Scott; Ivy Smith; Tony Tribe; Louise Vines
19 July – 26 August 1980	Paintings	Arthur Cotterell
19 July – 26 August 1980	Watercolours	Pat Tucker
30 August – 30 September 1980	Pottery	Ray Auker
30 August – 30 September 1980	Watercolours and Ceramics	Dave Edmunds
30 August – 30 September 1980	Paintings, Prints, Drawings and Constructions	Inger Lawrance
4 October – 4 November 1980	Paintings and Drawings	John Mallcott-Mills; Martin Ward
8 November – 9 December 1980	Photographs	Peter Johns
8 November – 9 December 1980	Sculpture, Pottery, Paintings, Drawings and Stained Glass	Catherine Armstrong
13 December 1980 to 20 January 1981	New pictures for the Art Gallery collection	
13 December 1980 to 20 January 1981	Pastel Pictures	Frances Treanor
24 January – 24 February 1981	Paintings	Penny Carey
24 January – 24 February 1981	Icon Paintings	Jasmina Draskovic-Johnson
24 January – 24 February 1981	Paintings and Watercolours	Charlotte Forman
24 January – 24 February 1981	Sculpture	Sue Lamb
13 June – 14 July 1981	Solo Show	Victor Pasmore
18 July - 25 August 1981	Group ’77 Printmakers	Betty Allen; Sally Brodholt; Edith Hill; Jane Gray; Mollie Russell-Smith; Dinah Travis; Carol Walkin; Margaret Wilson
29 August – 29 September 1981	Paintings	Doris Little
3 October – 3 November 1981	Batik Paintings and Drawings	Barbara Huish
3 October – 3 November 1981	Paintings and Drawings	Bill Huish
1982	Solo Show	Zadok Ben-David
1982	Public Views	Stephen Rumney
1982	Artists in Adult Education	Lindsey Adams; Niel Bally; Ashton Chadwick; John Flemons; Michael Fletcher; Ray Garvey; Robin Hazlewood; Ann Kilvington; Charles Manning; Alistair Skinner; Chrish R H Snook; Michael Stanley; Minna Thornton; Paul Wilson
20 November - 21 December 1982	Paintings	Alan Gouk; Geoff Rigden
1983	Goldsmiths’ show	Christopher Andrews; Kerry Andrews; Philip Bird; Graham Coupe; Pamela Day; Alan Franklin; Martin Spanyol; Victor Willis
20 August – 20 September 1983	Textiles	Maria-Theresa Fernandez
24 September – 18 October 1983	Have You Seen Sculpture from the Body	Ulmen Aygin; Hilde Köhly; Gillian Brent; Michael Marren; Owen Cunningham; Paul McGonigle; Martin Ferrabee; Simon Orman; Francisco Gazitua; Robert Persey; Katherine Gili; Pamela Pinhorn; Robin Greenwood; Mark Skilton; Thomas Grimsey; Anthony Smart
10 November – 4 December 1984	Work by Beckenham Textile Studio	Sylvia Bates; Irene Dobson; Valerie Dow; Mary Fogg; Margaret Gabay; Margaret Gartell; Geraldin Gillet; Mary Howell; Barbara Kinsley; Renée Leale; Moyra McNeill; Pamela Pavitt; Monica Perry; Shelia Rabbetts; Valerie Riley; Pat Salt; Marjorie Self; Audrey Shaheen; Ann Shearn; Barbara Siedlecka; Cynthia Singer; Dinah Travis; Anne Vaughan; Julie Walker; Pat Wood
7 – 31 March 1985	Photographs	Gregory Pavely; Santiago Castrillon; Keith Cardwell; John Stathatos
6 July – 6 August 1985	Norfolk House SPACE studios at Woodlands	Manuel Aja-Herrera; Jobe Berrington; Niamh Collins; Joan Diamantis; Linda Dodd; Paul Donnelly; Ken Janks; Philip Hodgetts; Sophie Horton; Sally Kidall; Susan Kinley; Laura Knoblock; Robert Koenig; Peter Maris; Gerda Rubinstein; Julieta Rubio; Rita Smith; Steven Veldkamp; Jean Wilson
14 September – 8 October 1985	Group Exhibition	Dave Mabb
14 September – 8 October 1985	Group Exhibition	Andrew Carmichael
14 September – 8 October 1985	Group Exhibition	Sue Kelly
14 September – 8 October 1985	Group Exhibition	John Wood
12 October – 5 November 1985	Retrospective Show	Rowland Hilder
1986	Solo Show	Manuel Aja-Herrara
8 August – 2 September 1986	Solo Show	Pierre Vivant
2 – 26 May 1987	Paintings and Prints	Martyn Brewster
2 – 26 May 1987	Paintings and Drawings	William Mills
25 June – 26 July 1988	Prints	Kathleen Crozier
25 June – 26 July 1988	Drawings	Richard Evans
25 June – 26 July 1988	Paintings and Prints	Avis Thornton
25 June – 26 July 1988	Paintings & Sculpture	Kim Tong

== Exhibitions 1990s ==
Dates	Title	Artist(s)
11 August – 9 September 1990	Creative Textiles and Ceramics	
1991	Solo show	Kathryn Ensall
1992	Retrospective (1942–92)	Pedro Friedeberg
26 November 1994 – 14 January 1995	Abstract paintings and prints of painters' painter	Albert Irvin
8 December 1995 – 16 January 1986	A retrospective exhibition of oil paintings and collages	John Christopherson
24 October – 21 November 1998	Wide Time	Susan Hinks; Ian Bottle; Gareth Edwards

== Exhibitions 2000s ==
Dates	Title	Artist(s)
19 October – 12 November 2000	Enclosures/Disclosures (mixed media work, paintings, sculpture and photography)	Artists including Paul Rooney
20 January – 4 February 2001	Sculpture and drawings	Carl Plackman
22 March – 15 April 2001	Collection of diverse recent paintings	Rosemary Morison; Ruth Sumner; Val Flack; Bruce Williams
2 – 24 June 2001	The London Group	
16 February – 15 March 2003	The London Group 90th Anniversary	Peter Clossick; Anthony John Plowden Eyton; Alfred Harris
23 Mar-12 Apr 2003	Greenwich open studios	

In 1996, John Christopherson died with instructions for donations to Woodlands Art Gallery.

In October 2003, the local history library was moved to a new site on the Royal Arsenal site in Woolwich – later the Greenwich Heritage Centre – and the gallery subsequently closed.
