= Ida Henstock =

English calligrapher (1896–1982)

Ida Doris Henstock (1896–1982) was an English calligrapher. She created calligraphed manuscripts and heraldic designs, including several commemorative works for World Wars I and II.

== Life ==
Henstock was born in Sheffield in 1896 and trained in calligraphy and illumination by Madelyn Walker.

In the 1920s, Walker and Henstock joined the studio of calligrapher Graily Hewitt. Henstock remained Hewitt’s assistant for decades, and they produced many decorated manuscripts together, and also with Hewitt’s other assistant, Helen E. Hinkley.

Alongside commercial works, such as manuscripts of poems and plays, Hewitt and Henstock produced the Rolls of Honour for World War I and World War II. The pair created the Royal Army Medical Corps Roll of Honour and the House of Lords First World War Memorial Book, which contained a coat of arms on every page, and each family received a copy of its page. Henstock also produced the Lancashire Fusiliers Memorial Book and, with Alfred Fairbank, the Clement Danes RAF Memorial Book.

Henstock worked with the College of Arms, where she produced scrolls for those receiving the Order of the Garter, and for the Crown Office, producing Royal Patents for 40 years. In 1966, she was appointed a Member of the Royal Victorian Order for this work. She also produced presentation addresses and service books for churches including Portsmouth Cathedral.
