= John Simpson (silversmith) =

New Zealand silversmith and fine arts academic (1925–2025)

John Simpson ONZM
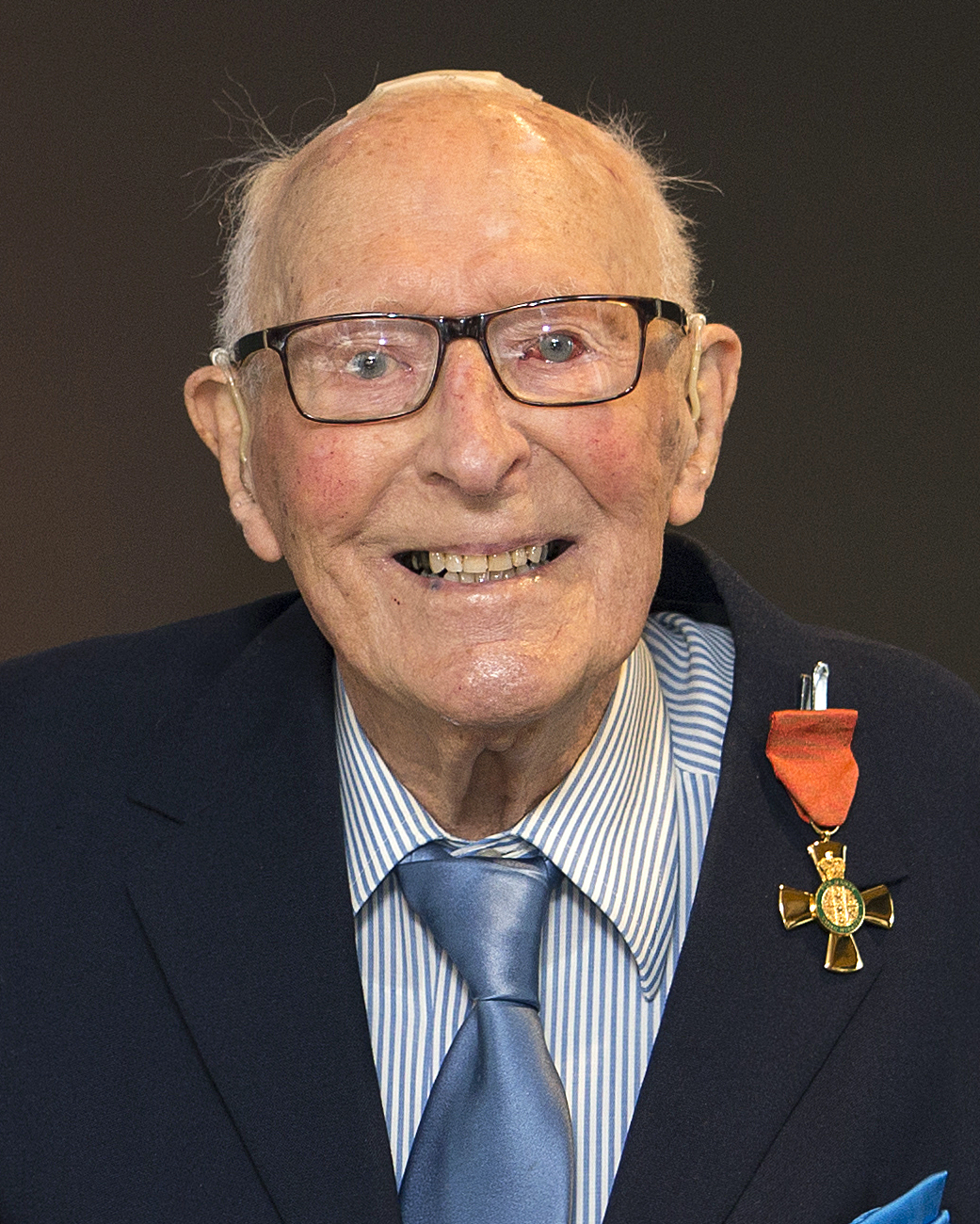
- Simpson in 2022
- Born: Harold John Simpson; 7 March 1925; Staple, Kent, England
- Died: 18 May 2025 (aged 100); Christchurch, New Zealand
- Occupations: Fine arts academic; silversmith
- Employer: University of Canterbury (1958–1990)
- Spouse: Ming Simpson (m. 1954; died 2012)
- Children: 3

Harold John Simpson ONZM (7 March 1925 – 18 May 2025) was a British-born New Zealand fine arts academic and silversmith who was professor emeritus of fine arts at the University of Canterbury. He was the first professor of fine arts at the university and headed its School of Fine Arts for 29 years, from 1961 until 1990. Simpson was appointed Officer of the New Zealand Order of Merit (ONZM) in the 2021 Birthday Honours for his services to art education.

== Biography ==
Simpson was born in Staple, Kent on 7 March 1925. Simpson enrolled at the Canterbury College of Art in 1940, making several pieces before getting conscripted into the RAF and serving until 1943. In 1950, he was invited to make a teapot for the Festival of Britain. He was one of the six people invited to make work for the festival. A year later, Simpson completed his diploma in art teaching. In the early 1950s, he taught at the Brighton College of Art and worked at The Guild of St Joseph and St Dominic. In 1952, Simpson was among the co-founders of the Society for Italic Handwriting. Simpson had been a lecturer at the College of Art & Industrial Design in Newcastle upon Tyne when he was appointed senior lecturer in design at the University of Canterbury in 1958 after being chosen by a University of London selection board, moving to Christchurch with his wife, Ming. After the death of Colin Lovell-Smith, Simpson considered applying for head of the Ilam School of Fine Arts. His lecturer position at Canterbury was initially intended for three years, after which he would return to England and take up a promised lectureship position at the Central School of Art and Design. Persuaded by his wife, Simpson applied for the headship position. He was accepted, serving as the first professor of fine arts and head of the School of Fine Arts from 1961 until his retirement in 1990. Simpson was professor emeritus after his retirement.

Along with fellow University of Canterbury lecturer Russell Clark and Auckland City Art Gallery director Peter Tomory; Simpson was a judge for the Kelliher Art Prize and the Hay's Art Prize, sponsored by James Hay's Haywrights, in 1960. Also in 1960, on the occasion of the wedding of Princess Margaret and Antony Armstrong-Jones, Simpson was commissioned by the New Zealand Government to design and make a wedding present to be given to the Princess by New Zealand. Spending a 1000 hours on it, he crafted a pair of silver kiwis for the present. In 2006, the pieces were sold at an auction at Christie's, with the proceeds going to charity.

In 1961, Simpson designed the coat of arms of the University of Canterbury, which was approved and authorized for official use by the English Kings of Arms in letters patent in 1965.

In 2018, Simpson donated a collection of books to the Christchurch Art Gallery, which were displayed in an exhibition lasting from December 2019 until March 2020. His papers are also in possession of the Christchurch Art Gallery.

He married Ming Simpson in 1954, they went on to have three children. Ming died in 2012. Simpson died at a retirement village in Christchurch on 18 May 2025, at the age of 100.

== Board and committee memberships and positions ==
Simpson was vice president of Canterbury Society of Arts for 9 years, and a member of its council for 28 years. He served on the board of Queen Elizabeth II Arts Council for 6 years. Simpson was co-founder of Design Association of New Zealand and served on its executive board. He was a member of a government appointed design committee for decimal coinage and banknotes and the advisory council for the selection of postage stamps.

== Honours ==
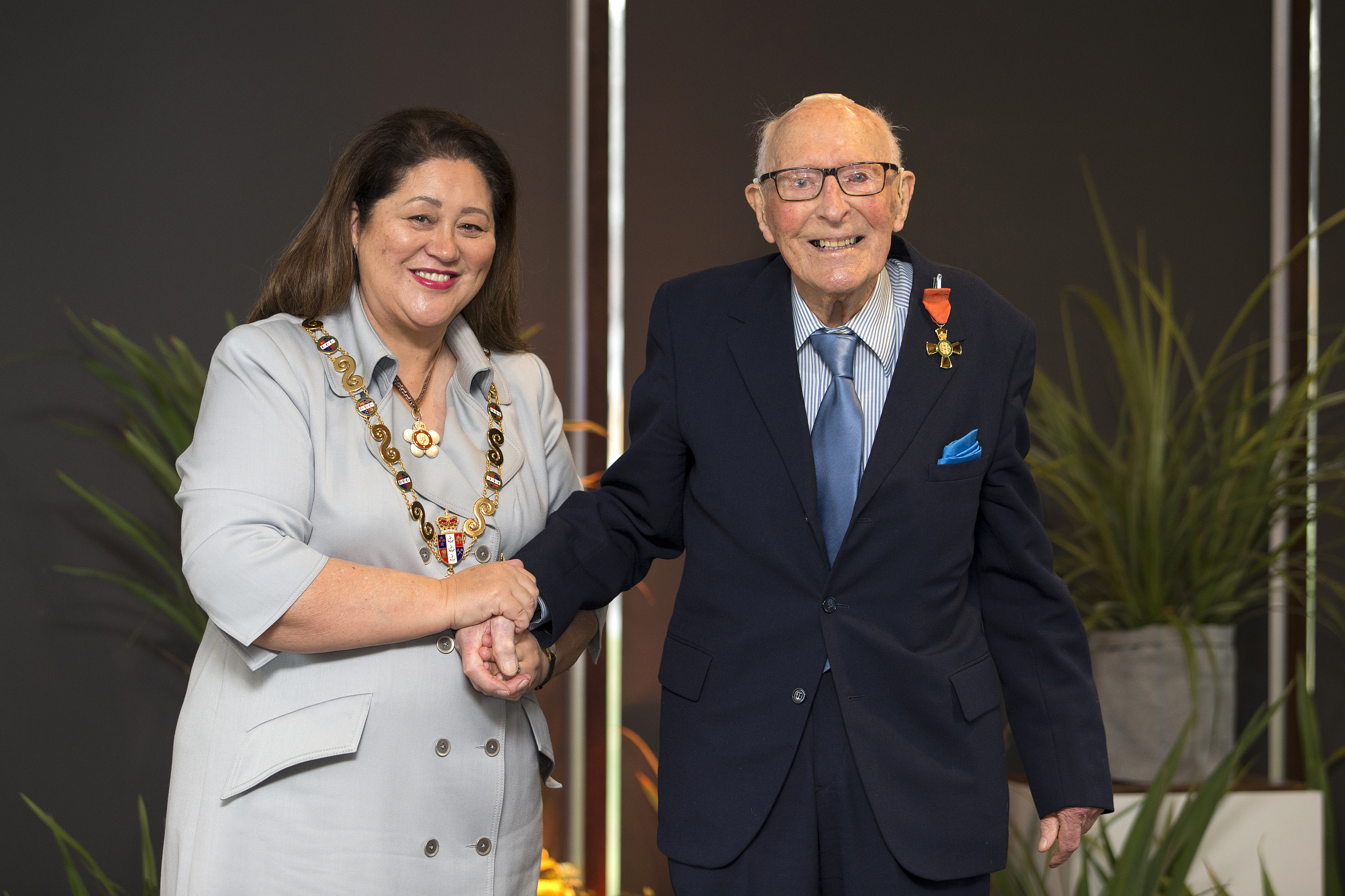
Simpson (right), after his investiture as an Officer of the New Zealand Order of Merit by the governor-general, Dame Cindy Kiro, at Christchurch Town Hall, on 7 July 2022

- Simpson was appointed Officer of the New Zealand Order of Merit (ONZM) in the 2021 Birthday Honours for services to art education.
