= Alfred Hoare Powell =

British architect

- Born: 14 April 1865; Reading, Berkshire, England, U.K.
- Died: 1960 (aged 94–95)
- Occupation: Architect
- Spouse: Ada Louise Powell
- Buildings: Brandsby Hall, Yorkshire; Bedales School
- Projects: Long Copse, Ewhurst, Surrey

Alfred Hoare Powell (1865–1960) was an English Arts and Crafts architect, and designer and painter of pottery.

== Early life, education, and career ==
Alfred Powell was born in Reading, Berkshire, on 14 April 1865, the son of Thomas Edward Powell and Emma Corrie.

Powell was the architectural pupil of John Dando Sedding, working in the "crafted Gothic" tradition inspired by the art critic and philosopher John Ruskin.

He was briefly engaged to diarist Olive Garnett in 1897. Powell married Ada Louise Powell, née Lessore (1882–1956); the daughter of an artist, she had studied embroidery, calligraphy and illuminating.

Alfred and Louise Powell became celebrated as pottery designers for Wedgwood. They hand-painted many thousands of pieces and trained "paintresses" for Wedgwood. They collaborated on the revitalisation of the arts and crafts, rejecting industrialisation and designing furniture decoration, embroidery and ceramics, and encouraging a communitarian spirit in the South Cotswolds.

Powell, with the younger architect Norman Jewson, was the most significant associate of Ernest Gimson and the brothers Ernest and Sidney Barnsley at Sapperton, in Gloucestershire, in the Cotswold Arts and Crafts revival. He settled nearby at Gurners Farm, Oakridge Lynch in 1902, but sold the house in 1916, and moved to The Thatched House, Tunley near Oakridge, in the 1920s, and later lived at Tarlton near Rodmarton.

He worked with Detmar Blow and F.W. Troup for both the National Trust and the Society for the Protection of Ancient Buildings.

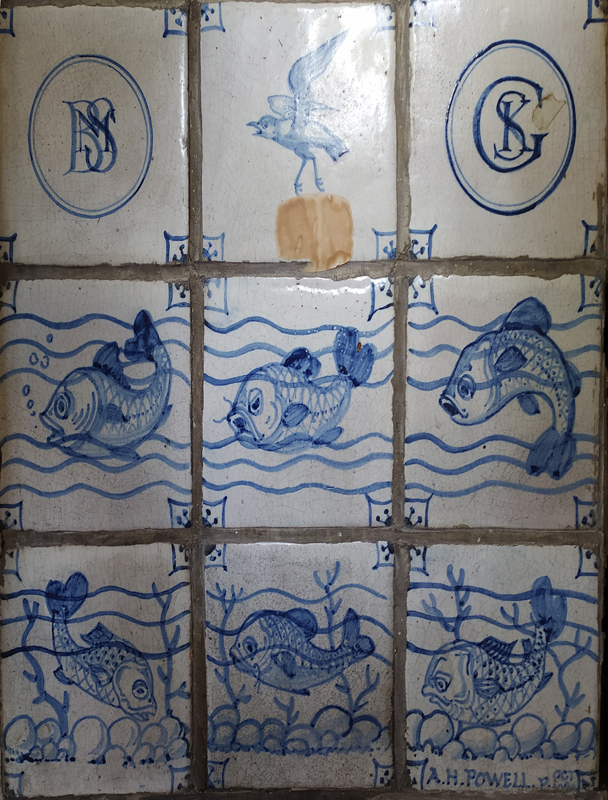
Fireplace tiles designed by Powell

=== Architectural works ===
Powell's architectural works include a number of works for Hugh Fairfax-Cholmeley, Squire of Brandsby, Yorkshire. He designed extensive modifications and extensions for Hugh's house at Mill Hill (original architect, Detmar Blow), changing it from a simple house designed for community living, to the desirable residence it remains to today. He designed the gardens, both flower and kitchen gardens, the gates and all external features.

He designed Dale End House, Brandsby, which was built for the artist Joseph Crawhall and his mother.

Powell contributed elements to the design of Hugh Fairfax-Cholmeley's worker cottage design, to ensure that these were not just functional, but of good design.

He also designed and built an ornamental fireplace at Swathgill in the 1920s, for the Fairfax-Cholmeleys, this included painted panels and tiles. Unfortunately, a later occupant of Swathgill dismantled the decorative elements of this fireplace, but the tiles survive, should a future occupant choose to reinstate them, though the painted panels have disappeared.

Powell also designed fireplace tiles for Tom Jones's house in St Nicholas-at-Wade: the tiles include the initials of Sidney Kyffin Greenslade (the architect who designed the house), and Molly Bernhard-Smith (the art dealer who introduced Jones to the village).

He did repairs at Alfriston Clergy House, Barrington Court, Somerset, and Queens' College, Cambridge; and projects with other members of the Gimson school at Pinbury Park and Rodmarton Manor, near Sapperton, and Bedales School in Hampshire. Long Copse (1897), at Ewhurst, Surrey, was much praised by contemporaries; it was described by the painter G. F. Watts as the most beautiful house in Surrey.

Powell's architectural work is described in Michael Drury's book, Wandering Architects: In Pursuit of an Arts and Crafts Ideal.

He built a summer home and pottery studio in Tarlton (51.6913°N 2.0659°W). Now called Studio Cottage, it is a Grade II listed (2010) timber-framed house, with large grounds and a semi-circular ha-ha separating it from the surrounding land of the Rodmarton estate. It is in a poor state of repair. It has many Arts and Crafts features and original fittings, including some Gimson works. The pottery studio is a long thatched-roofed building used by the Powells in their pottery design business, and to train local workers for Wedgwood.

Powell edited the memorial volume to his friend Ernest Gimson, Ernest Gimson: His Life and Work (1924), with contributions by William Richard Lethaby and F. L. Griggs.

== Literature and sources ==
- Good Workmanship with Happy Thought: The Work of Alfred and Louise Powell, Exhibition Catalogue, 1992
- Drury, Michael (2000). Wandering Architects: In Pursuit of an Arts and Crafts Ideal. Stamford, Lincs: Shaun Tyas. ISBN 190028913X.
- Sarsby, Jacqueline (1997). "Alfred Powell: Idealism and Realism in the Cotswolds". Journal of Design History, vol. 10, No. 4. Craft, Culture and Identity, pp. 375–397.
