= Noël Gilford Adeney =

British artist (1890–1978)

Noël Gilford Adeney (1890 – 24 January 1978) was a British artist, known for her landscape and still life paintings and a member of The London Group.

== Biography ==
Noël Gilford was born in Surrey, the daughter of William Gilford, a landowner, and his wife Elizabeth. Noël Gilford was educated in Darlington and studied at the Slade School of Fine Art in London from 1910 to 1915. At the Slade she trained as a dress designer; one of her garments is featured in the portrait of cellist Guilhermina Suggia by the Welsh painter Augustus John. She met textile designer Phyllis Barron at The Slade and used her hand-blockprinted fabric for her dress making.

In 1921, she married the English painter and textile designer Bernard Adeney who she had met in 1918, his first wife was the painter Thérèse Lessore. Their son Richard Adeney was a flautist who played principal flute with the London Philharmonic Orchestra.

Adeney wrote a novel, No Coward Soul, published by Hogarth Press in 1956. It is a semi-biographical account of her encounters with the novelist and painter Denton Welch (fictionalised as 'Merton Hughes').

In 2004, her painting called Still life of two jugs with tulips and daffodils, and a pansy in a pot to the side sold at Christie's auction house for £657.
