= Alfred Fairbank =

English calligrapher and paleographer

Alfred Fairbank CBE
- Born: 12 July 1895; Grimsby, Lincolnshire, England
- Died: 14 March 1982 (aged 86); Hove, Sussex
- Education: Central School of Art and Design
- Known for: Calligraphy, Handwriting, Palaeography
- Style: Italic Script
- Parents: Alfred John Fairbank (father); Emma Greetham (mother)
- Relatives: Elsie Kneeshaw
- Website: fairbankcalligraphysociety.com

Alfred John Fairbank CBE (12 July 1895 – 14 March 1982) was a British calligrapher, palaeographer and author on handwriting.

Fairbank was a founding member of the Society of Scribes and Illuminators in 1921, and later became its honourable secretary. He was involved in the foundation of the Society for Italic Handwriting in 1952; his work and 1932 textbook A Handwriting Manual were influential on the italic script handwriting taught in British schools. His portrait was painted by Anna Hornby. For Penguin Books he wrote A Book of Scripts, on handwriting styles.

Fairbank was a civil servant who spent his professional career working at the Admiralty in London and Bath; he retired to Hove on the south coast and lectured at what is now the University of Brighton after his retirement. Fragments from medieval manuscripts collected by Alfred Fairbank are located at the Cadbury Research Library of the University of Birmingham.

== Early life ==
Alfred John Fairbank was born in Grimsby, Lincolnshire, on 12 July 1895, to his father of the same name; Alfred John Fairbank and his mother Emma Fairbank, née Greetham, he married his cousin Elsie Kneeshaw in 1919. They had a daughter Milfred Nolly Fairbank in 1922 in Bromley Kent but she died in the same year. They then had a son John Richard Fairbank in 1924.

Fairbank studied at the Central School of Art and Design where in 1920 he attended evening classes in lettering and illuminating under Graily Hewitt, who in turn had been taught at the same institute by Edward Johnston, Fairbank would later describe himself as a 'disciple' of Johnston. Johnston and his student Hewitt were the preeminent revivalists of calligraphy at the turn of the century and clearly influenced Fairbank.

== Career ==
Principal professional career:

- 1920–1955 – Civil servant at the Admiralty, based in London or Bath, until civil service retirement age of 60.
- 1955–1966 – Lecturer and adviser at Brighton College of Art

Despite being an Admiralty civil servant for the majority of his career, Fairbank created acclaimed artistic works of calligraphy and works of palaeography as catalogued below.

== Italic handwriting ==
Fairbank's greatest achievement was the revival of a general hand-writing style known as Italic Script which was invented in renaissance Rome and used extensively by the Vatican bureaucracy. The style was described by writings from the era by Arrighi in his 1522 pamphlet La Operina, where he described a sub-style which became known as Chancery Hand, then shortly afterwards in 1538 by Palatino in his treatise on calligraphy, Libro nuovo d'imparare a scrivere. Examples of other master scribes from the era were: - Bartolmeo San Vito, Antonio Tophio & Bartolomeo Fonzio.

Fairbanks studied this style in his Palaeographical scholarly work and practiced it through his calligraphy, he realised the significant improvements this style had on previous hand-writing scripts and indeed on modern scripts in terms such as clarity, beauty and speed of writing. So he began to strongly advocate for its revival, but unlike the mainly artistic revival work of his mentors Johnston and Hewitt, Fairbank proposed that the hand was universally taught at schools.

To this end, Fairbank produced educational works which were used in schools, A Handwriting Manual (1932) and the Beacon Writing Books (1959), written in conjunction with educationists.

== Typography ==
In 1928, Fairbank designed an upright italic typeface for Monotype. Monotype chose to incorporate this within their Bembo family of typefaces despite the fact Fairbank had designed a unique typeface out of kilter with the general Bembo ethos, this irritated Fairbank, who thought it should have been an independent design. When Monotype digitised in 2004, they rectified this and recognised the uniqueness of Fairbank's work by both expanding and improving the typeface and marketing as Fairbank. Fairbank's original 1928 typeface was limited to the composition caster in metal type, only available in 4 sizes: 10, 12, 13 and 16pt (for large composition), the typeface was named "Bembo Condensed Italic", Monotype series 294.

Fairbank made clear why he was a calligrapher first and why he created so little typography:

I believe in the importance of the unique work, of things made for particular purposes. I claim the superiority of actual script over reproduced copies, on the same grounds as one believes in the painting more than in its reproduction, or the playing of an orchestra rather than the gramophone record. The reproduced work is expedient, although valuable for its service and essential for commerce. Handwriting is not done for reproduction, unless it is expedient, and it is not often that.

== New alphabets ==
English orthography is phonetically irregular, causing difficulty for children to learn to read; the mid-20th century was an unusual time when several attempts were made to address this issue, and in each case the proponents for change turned to Fairbank for the necessary calligraphy.

- In 1930, Robert Bridges, the poet laureate, asked Fairbank to design a new letter and afterwards they spoke about another more ambitious project for a new phonetic alphabet based on Roman type but this was ended by Bridges' death a short time later.
- In 1953, Fairbank successfully produced the calligraphic design for Sir James Pitman's new initial teaching alphabet. The remit for the alphabet was challenging, in that the cursive handwriting of the new alphabet had to be designed first then the typeface designed to mirror match so children saw exactly the same in both hand-written cursive form and printed form. This was an ideal challenge for Fairbank whose works on italic hand-writing had put him in good stead for hand-writing design and the large-scale studies which followed the implementation of the initial teaching alphabet proved how children's writing substantially improved when they used the initial teaching alphabet. The Monotype Corporation transliterated Fairbank's calligraphy onto a new version of their Ehrhardt typeface.

== Learned societies ==
- In 1921, the early students of Edward Johnston, including Alfred Fairbank, formed the Society of Scribes and Illuminators whose aims include the encouragement and practice of calligraphy and fine lettering. From being a founding member, Fairbank served as the honourable secretary between 1931 and 1934 which was the highest office of the Society at the time.
- In 1952, as the Society of Scribes and Illuminators was receiving so many enquiries about italic handwriting, it was decided to set up a separate Society for Italic Handwriting, whose aim was the revival then encouragement and promotion of the hand. Fairbank was the modern proponent of Italic Handwriting through his penmanship notes in the Society for Pure English - Tract XXVIII 'English Handwriting', which he later expanded upon in his Handwriting Manual of 1932. Consequently, Fairbank jointly founded the new society with Joseph Compton CBE (director of Education in London), who served as the inaugural chairman, Fairbank eventually became the third chairman (1973 - 1975).
- In 1977, Fairbank acquiesced to a request by the newly formed Victoria Society of Calligraphy and Italic Handwriting (in Canada) to honour his name by renaming the Society to the Fairbank Calligraphy Society.

== Manuscript books ==
- 1921-2, 17 Rolls of Honour of L.C.C. Schools, made under the direction of Lawrence Christie
- 1922, The Bull, by Ralph Hodgson, Paper, bought by Edwin J. Evans
- 1922, Winter Nghtfall, by J.C. Squire, parchment
- 1922, Marriage Service, Parchment, Illuminated by Mary H. Robinson
- 1923, Eye & Other Poems, by Ralph Hodson, paper
- 1923, Poems, by W. H. Davies, paper
- 1923, Eight Poems by R. L. Stevenson, parchment
- 1923, Biggleswade Book of Remembrance, parchment, illuminated by Lawrence Christie
- 1924, The XII Months, parchment, drawings by Lawrence Christie. (two copies, one purchased by Ambrose Heal)
- 1924, Thoughts in a Garden, by Andrew Marvell, parchment, illuminated by Marta Bowerley, bought by Ambrose Heal
- 1925, Three Poems, parchment, commissioned by G.B. Clothier
- 1925, Sirena, by Michael Drayton, parchment
- 1926, Comus, by John Milton, paper, illuminated by Louise Powell, in possession of Leonard Schlosser, New York
- 1926, Deed of Gift of Branze Bust of Wm. Archer. Written for the British Drama League
- 1926-9, Ecclesiasticus, parchment, illuminated by Louise Powell, commissioned by A.D. Power, who edited it, Fitzwilliam Museum, Cambridge
- 1926, The book of Ruth, paper, in possession of Miss Catharine Powell
- 1926, 25 sonnets of Shakespeare, paper, illuminated by Louis Powell, commissioned by Edwin J. Evans
- 1926-7, 24 Manuscript Copy-books of the Italic Hand, one in the Pierpont Morgan Library
- 1927-32, The Odes and Epodes of Horace, vellum, illuminated by Louise Powell, commissioned by Edwin J. Evans
- 1931, Aesop & Rhodope, by Savage Landor, paper, presented to Ambrose Heal
- 1931, Lines on the Euganean Hills, by Savage Landor, paper, illuminated by Louise Powell, in possession of Philip Hofer
- 1932, Sampler book of Sonnets, written in five italic hands, paper, commissioned by the Dryad Press, Leicester
- 1932, Twelve Poems, vellum, commissioned by H.H. Peach
- 1932-8, the Eclogues and Georgics of Virgil, vellum, illuminated by Louise Powell, commissioned by St John Hornby
- 1939, Book of Names, presented to Tom Jones C.H.. decorated by Berthold L. Wolpe
- 1949, Speeches on unveiling of memorial to President F. D. Roosevelt, in Westminster Abbey, vellum, presented by the Prime Minister to Mrs. Roosevelt

== Publications ==
- Society of Pure English - Tract No XXVIII English Handwriting Continued from Tract XXIII with Thirty-one Additional Plates, Alfred Fairbank, Edited By Robert Seymour Bridges (1844–1930) with Notes on penmanship, At the Clarendon Press Oxford University Press 1927, P.[223]-251, 35–65 pages. fasc,
- A Handwriting Manual, Leicester, The Dryad Press, 1932
  - revised editions 1947 & 1948: The Dryad Press, Leicester, printed at the Curwen Press, Plaistow, E.13,
  - third edition: revised and enlarged, 1961: London, Faber and Faber, 95 p., [32] p. pl,
  - Faber & Faber Ltd, new & enlarged edition, 1954, 5th edition 1956, revised & enlarged edition 1961, paperback edition 1965
  - Ninth edition, 1975: Watson-Guptill Publications, New York, with additional illustrations of demonstration scripts mainly from American sources
- Woodside Writing cards, 1932, Dryad Press, Leicester
- Dryad Lettering Card No. 2, 1932, Dryad Press, Leicester
- The Dryad Cards, Originally issued in 1935 as: The Barking Writing Cards. publisher: The Dryad Press, Leicester.
- Lettering Of To-Day, C.G. Holme; Eberhard Holscher, Alfred Fairbank, Anna Simons, Percy J. Smith, and R. Haughton James, Studio 1937
- A book of scripts, 1949, Harmondsworth, Middlesex, The King Penguin Books nr. 48, 64 p, ill., facs,
- Augustino Da Siena, the 1568 Edition of His Writing Book in Facsimile, Alfred Fairbank, publisher: David Godine, Boston, 1975. limited edition of 750 copies
- BEACON WRITING: A Course in Italic Set of 6, Alfred Fairbank, publisher: Ginn & Company LTD, London, 1958
- Humanistic script of the fifteenth and sixteenth centuries, Alfred John Fairbank & Richard William Hunt (1908–1979), Oxford, Bodleian Library, Bodleian picture books nr. 12, 8 p., 24 p. facs.
- Renaissance Handwriting: An Anthology of Italic Scripts, Alfred Fairbank & Berthold L. Wolpe (1905–1989), publishers: The World Publishing Company & Faber & Faber, London, 1960, 104, 96 p, facs,
- The Italic Hand in Tudor Cambridge: Forty-one Examples, Alfred Fairbank & Bruce Dickins. publisher: Bowes & Bowes, London, 1962, Monograph / Cambridge Bibliographical Society no. 5, VIII, 32 p., 24 p. pl, facs.
- How to Teach the Italic Hand Through the Beacon Writing Books, Alfred Fairbank, Ginn 1963
- Calligraphy and Palaeography, essays presented to Alfred Fairbank on his 70th birthday, ed. by A.S. Osley, publisher: Faber & Faber, London, 1965, with index. XXIII, 286 p, illustrations,
- Lettering – Modes of Writing in Western Europe from Antiquity to the Eighteenth Century, Hermann Degering with preface By Alfred Fairbank, Ernest Benn Ltd., London 1965 & Pentalic Corporation, N Y, 1965
- The Story of Handwriting: Origins and Development, Alfred Fairbank, Faber & Faber 1970

== Articles ==
- Notes on Penmanship (reproduced in facsimile), Society for Pure English Tract no. XXVIII: English Handwriting, edited by Robert Bridges, 1927
- Calligraphy and the Manuscript Book, London Mercury, May, 1930
- Edward Johnston und die englische Kalligraphie, Schrift und Schreiben December 1931
- Italic Handwriting, The Dryad Quarterly, April 1932
- The Teaching of Handwriting: A Suggested Reform, Journal of the RoyalSociety of Arts, 16 December 1932
- Writing Reform, The Teachers World, 11 January 1933
- English Calligraphy and Illuminating, Die Zeitgemasse Schrift, no. 32, January 1935,
- Calligraphy, Lettering of Today, Studio Ltd. 1937, 1941, 1945, 1949, Edited by C.G. Holme
- Handwriting Reform, Typography, 4, Autumn 1937, repeated in: P.M. Journal U.S.A. December–January 1938-9
- On Writing `Fair', Tribute to Walter de la Mare on his Saventy-fifth Birthday, Faber & Faber Ltd. 1948
- Tribute IV, Tributes to Edward Johnston Calligrapher, Maidstone School of Art, 1948
- Handwriting Reform in England, Schweizer Graphische Mitteilungen, August 1948, Repeated in: Printing Review, Spring 1950
- Italic Handwriting, Journal of the Royal Society of Arts, 19 October 1951
- With Pen in Hand, Children's Newspaper, 26 January 1952
- Handwriting, Manchester Evening Chronicle, 26 November 1952
- This is Everyman's Handicraft, Christiaan Science Monitor, 9 March 1951
- Take Pen and Write, Venture: Journal of the Civil Service Council for Further Education, September 1953
- A Graceful Cure for the Common Scrawl: A Fair Italic Hand, London Illustrated News, 12 March 1955
- Cursive Handwriting, The Calligraphers Handbook, Faber & Faber Ltd., edited by: C.M. Lamb
- Die Cancellaresca in Handschrift und Drucktype: Die Schreibücher von Arrighi, Tagliente und Palentino, Imprimatur 1956/7, Edited by: Siegfried Bunchenau und Dr. Georg Kurt Schauer
- Italic Handwriting, The Schoolmaster, October/November 1960
- Morris and Calligraphy, The Journal of the William Morris Society, Winter 1961
- Bartholomew Dodington: Elizabethan Scholar and Penman, Motif 9, Summer 1962, edited by: Ruari McLean
- Looking at Letters and Words, Studies in Honor of Berthold Louis Ullman, Volume II, Editioni di Storia e Letteratura 1964, edited by: Charles Henderson Jr.
- Italic in its Own Right, Alphabet 1964, edited by: R.S. Hutchings

== Short articles in the Bulletin & Journal of the Society for Italic Handwriting ==
- A note on Speed, Bulletin 3, summer 1955
- The Recent History of Italic Handwriting, Bulletin 6, spring 1956
- A System of Movements, Bulletin 13, winter 1957-8
- Some Renaissance Manuscripts, Bulletin 15, summer 1958
- Ascenders in Writing Models, Bulletin 17, winter 1958-9
- Nomenclatur, Bulletin 18, spring 1959
- Bartholomew Dodington, Bulletin 19, summer 1959
- Let Reason Go before Enterprise, Bulletin 21, winter 1959-60
- The Mystic Art, Bulletin 21, winter 1959-60
- A Writing Lesson, Bulletin 24, autumn 1960
- More about Arrighi, Bulletin 26, spring 1961
- Bartolomeo San Vito, Bulletin 28, autumn 1961
- Three Renessance Scripts, Journal 32, autumn 1962
- The Script of Pietro Cennini, Journal 33, winter 1962
- Condensed Bembo Italic, Journal 33, winter 1962
- The Arrighi Style of Book Hand, Journal 35, summer 1963
- Scripts of Papal Briefs, Journal 36, autumn 1963
- Italic at Brighton, Journal 39, summer 1964
- What makes a Good Style?, Journal 42, spring 1965
- More of Sna Vito, Journal 42, spring 1965
- A Ten-hour Manuscript, Journal 43, summer 1965
- Simple Geometric Aspects of Italic, Journal 44, autumn 1965
