= William Wyld =

English painter

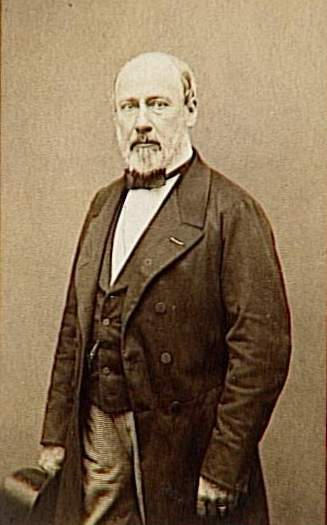
- William Wyld, c. 1865
- Born: 1806
- Died: 25 December 1889 (aged 82–83)
- Occupation: English painter

William Wyld (1806 in London – 25 December 1889 in Paris) was an English wine merchant and landscape painter, mainly in watercolour, who mostly lived in France, and mixed in French artistic circles. He participated at the Exposition Universelle of 1855. He was a friend of the painters Ary Scheffer and Paul Delaroche among others.

== Early life and career ==
Born to a family that had produced rich merchants for several generations, he gained a pronounced taste for drawing very young. On the death of a young uncle (also good at drawing) after a fall from a horse when William was aged 6, William inherited his drawing materials. Aged 20, he lost his father but family relations allowed him to be made secretary to the British Consulate in Calais thanks to the statesman George Canning. There he served Lord Granville and got to know the watercolourist François Louis Thomas Francia (an admirer of Thomas Girtin and a teacher of Richard Parkes Bonington), then living in Calais, and studied under him.

When his family's protector, Canning, died on 8 August 1827 it became clear Wyld's diplomatic career could proceed no higher since he had interrupted his studies too soon. One of his friends was John Lewis Brown, active in commerce and also a major collector of Bonington's watercolours, and Brown gained him an opportunity to work as a wine merchant exporting champagne from Épernay to England. During periods of enforced leisure Wyld used the free time to draw and paint with his friend right across France, from Dieppe to Rouen and meeting Horace Vernet, then at the height of his fame.

Wyld worked for 6 years as a champagne merchant from 1827 to 1833, making use of the job's opportunities to network with the local artistocracy and to become well-versed in viticulture.

== Travels as a painter ==
He always wished to become a painter but delayed setting out on that course to allow his younger brother to come of age first, so that he could succeed him in the wine business. With his friend the Baron de Vialar he then set out for Algiers. The Baron fell in love with the country, bought a house there (where Wyld stayed six months) and became a member of the Conseil Général. This country had only been conquered in 1830 and had already been visited some time ago by Isabey and Delacroix. Wyld was about to leave the country when he learned that Vernet was on board a warship anchored in the bay of Algiers en route to Rome to take up his new post as director of the Académie de France – the two men had only seen each other once in 6 years. Wyld presented himself on board the ship, was immediately recognised by Vernet and encouraged by him to become a painter, Vernet never having doubted that Wyld would one day do so. He proposed that Wyld come with him to Rome in an official fashion and promised to find him some means of support there.

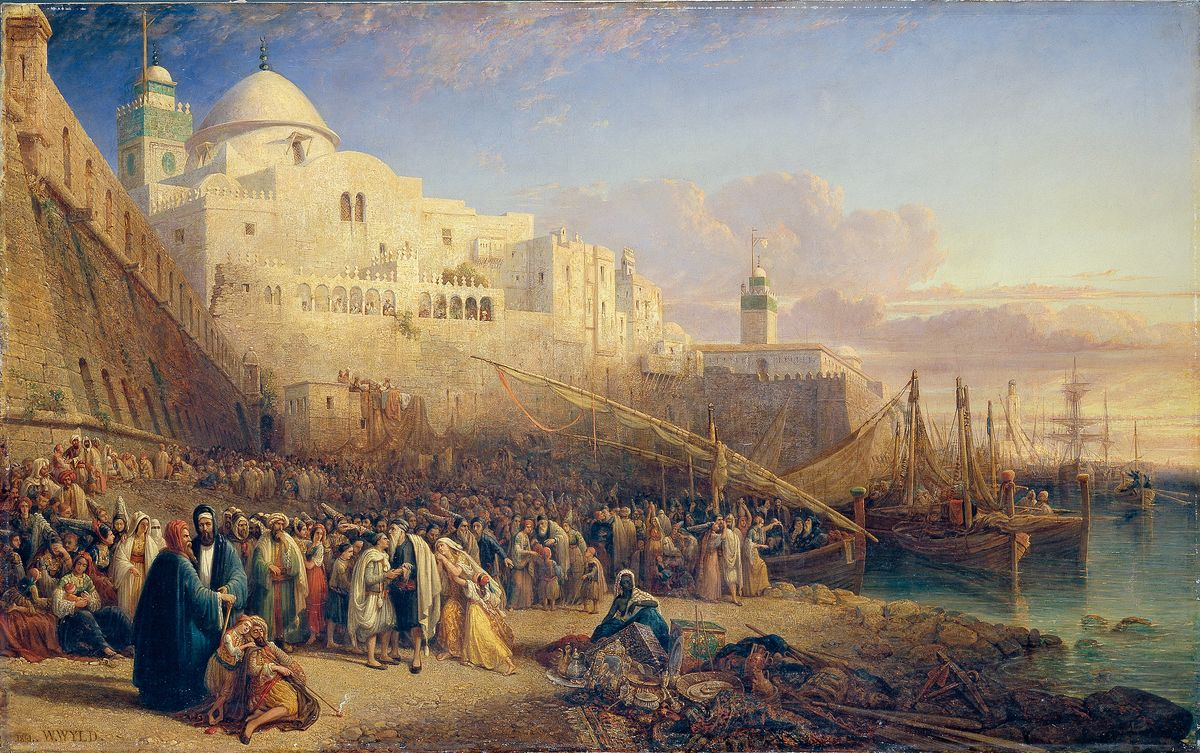
Le Départ d'Israélites pour la Terre sainte (scène algérienne), 1841

Arriving in Rome, Wyld received commissions for orientalist paintings from Vernet's entourage, including from the sculptor Bertel Thorvaldsen, whose portrait Vernet had painted some years earlier. Admiring Michelangelo and Raphael, after 6 months in Rome Wyld decided to make a tour of the whole of Italy on foot with a companion (apparently Émile-Aubert Lessore).

== Life in France ==
On 1 January 1834, they crossed the Simplon Pass in a cart during a snowstorm and he then set up his studio in Paris, where he was commissioned to produce paintings of orientalist scenes and Venetian architecture. Becoming known to the public, he exhibited a 2m wide canvas "Venice at Sunrise" at the Paris Salon of 1839, winning the 1st Gold Medal in the 3rd class for it.

Thanks to Vernet he mingled in the highest artistic circles of the July Monarchy and became friends with Ary Scheffer and Paul Delaroche (even though Scheffer and Delaroche would not talk to each other). He seems to have made another foreign trip in 1844, to Algeria and Egypt. In 1845 he travelled to Brittany, where he built friendships, in particular with the Comtesse de Tromelin, born Mathilde Devin de Belleville in 1813, with whom he stayed and to whom he dedicated his "Chemin à Ploujean" (in a dedication that attests to the strength of their relationship).

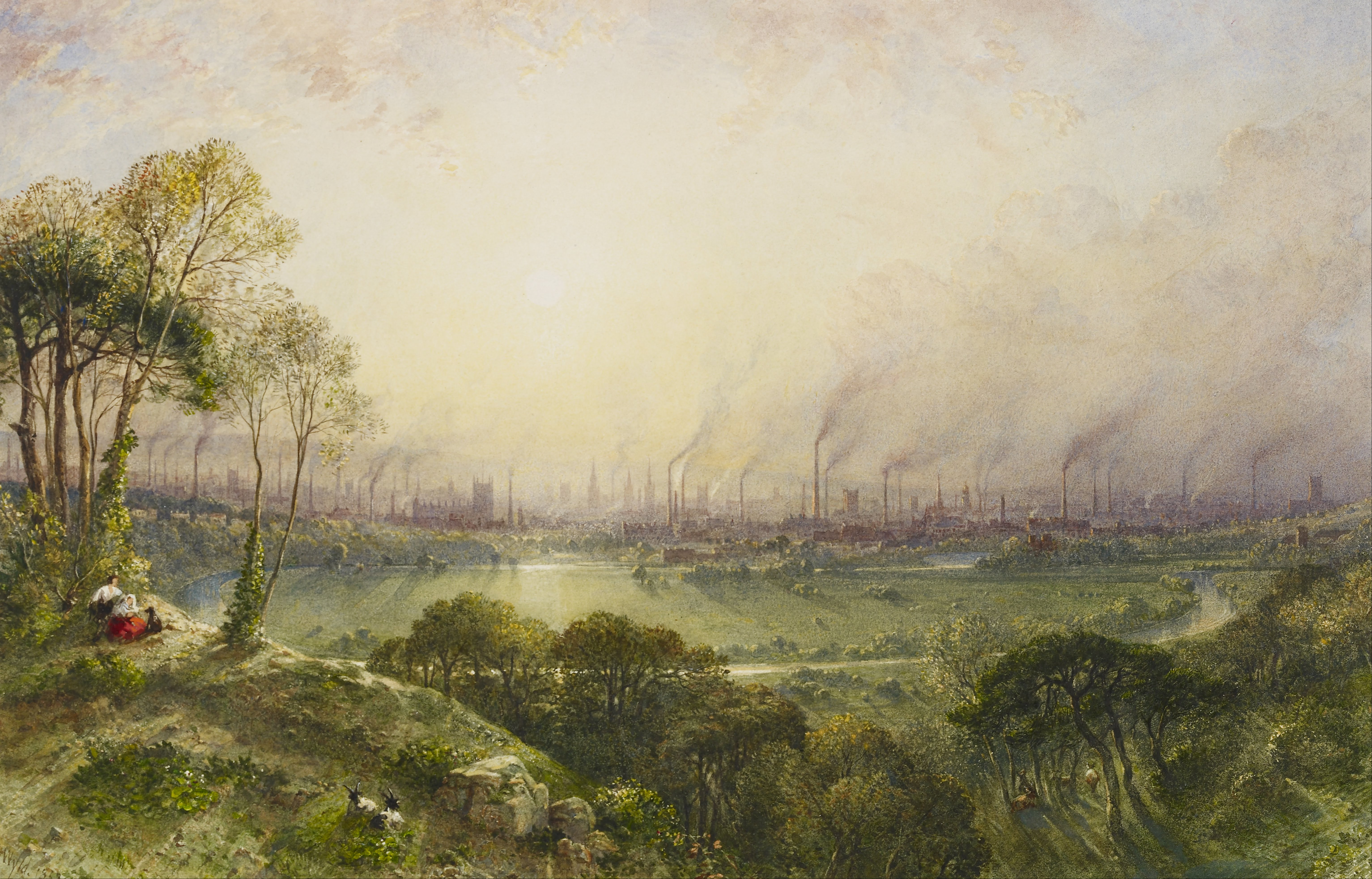
Manchester from Kersal Moor

He travelled to Fougères in Ille-et-Vilaine, then at Morlaix in Finistère.

After the 1848 Revolution he returned to the United Kingdom where he specialized in orientalist subjects, became a member of the New Society of Painters in Water Colours and had a major success with the businessmen of Manchester, making paintings crammed full of detail for them. In 1851 his admirer Queen Victoria commissioned paintings of Liverpool and Manchester to celebrate her visit there, which remain in the Royal Collection along with examples of his orientalist works. His View of Manchester has become an iconic image of the 19th-century Cottonopolis. In 1852 the Queen invited him to her summer residence at Balmoral Castle to draw its surroundings.

He then continued to live in Paris and exhibit at various salons. He was invited to the festivities for Queen Victoria's visit to France in 1855 (the first by a British head of state since 1520), at which he produced a monumental view of château de Saint-Cloud. He participated in the 1855 Exposition in the Pavillon des Arts at the request of Comte Émilien de Nieuwerkerke, effectively French arts minister, on which occasion he was given the Légion d'honneur.

== Death ==
He remained active until his last breath, dying in his Paris home in 1889. His widow continued to take pupils, among them Nina Fagnani.

== Works ==
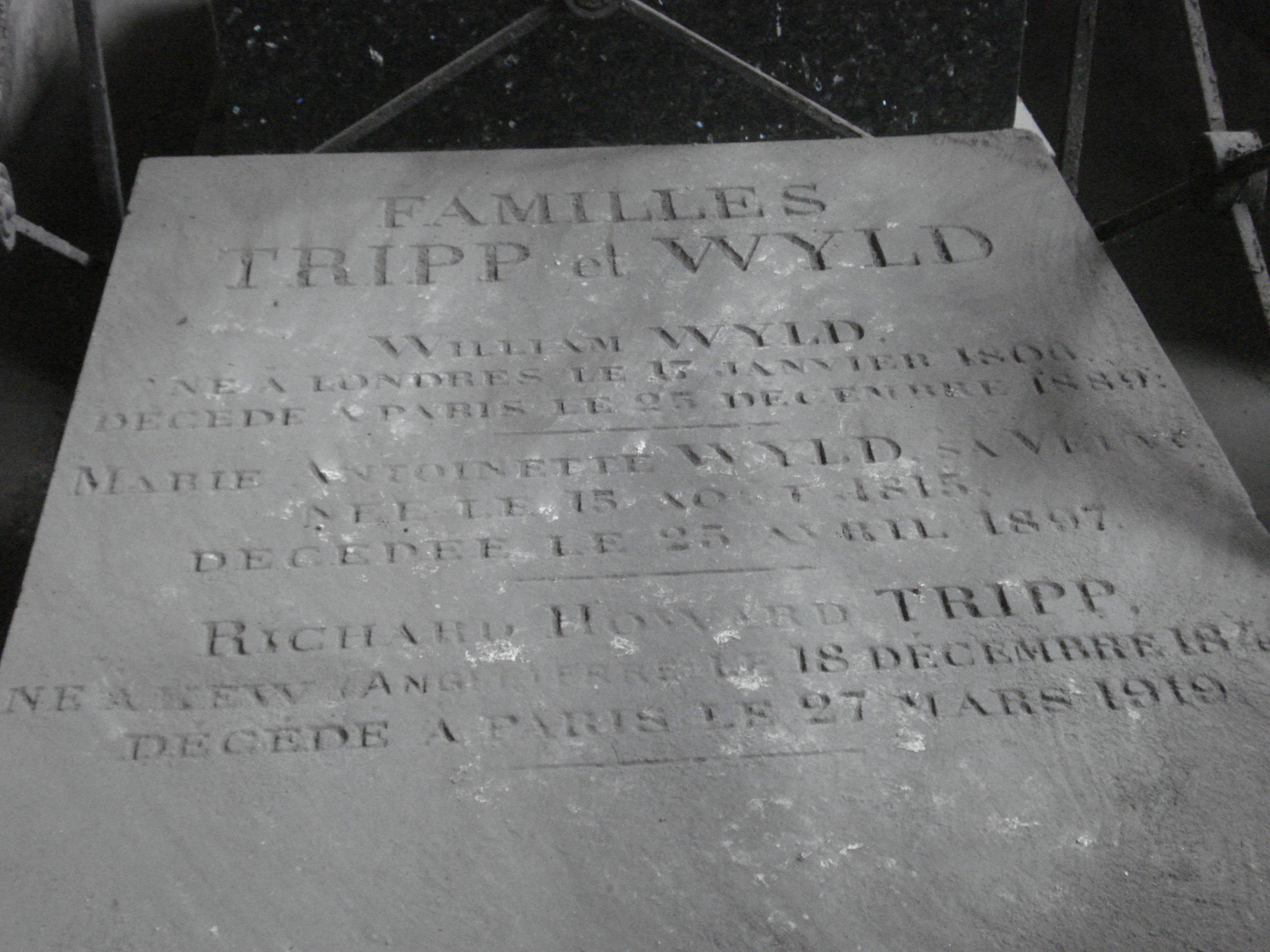
The grave of William WYLD and Richard Howard TRIPP in Montmartre cemetery, 18th division, under the bridge Caulaincourt

- "The Tivoli Falls" – V&A Museum
- "The Tuileries", "The Panthéon" – Musée Carnavalet, Paris
- "Riva Schiavoni in Venice" – several copies, including Williamson Art Gallery and Museum, Birkenhead; Moorlands House, Leek; and private collections
- "St Cloud", watercolour – San Francisco Museum of Fine Arts, California
- "Nuremberg" gouache, watercolour on paper – Harris Museum, Preston

== Museums holding his works ==
4 artworks by or after William Wyld at the Art UK site

- Royal Collection, Windsor Castle
- Musée des Jacobins at Morlaix (29) Finistère
- Sheffield Museums

== Bibliography ==
- Gérard. M. Ackerman: "Les Orientaliste de l'École Britannique".
- P. G. Hamerton: "Sketches in Italy by William Wyld". Portfolio, vol III, 1877, pp. 64–67, 126–129, 140–144, 160–164, 178–180, 193–196.
- Marcia Pointon: "Bonington Francia and Wyld", London, 1985.
- Marcia Pointon: "The Bonington circle", Sussex, 1985.
- Nabila Oulebsir: "Les usages du patrimoine", Algeria, 2004, pp. 82.
