= Rodmarton =

Village in Gloucestershire, England

Coordinates: 51.6803°N 2.0865°W

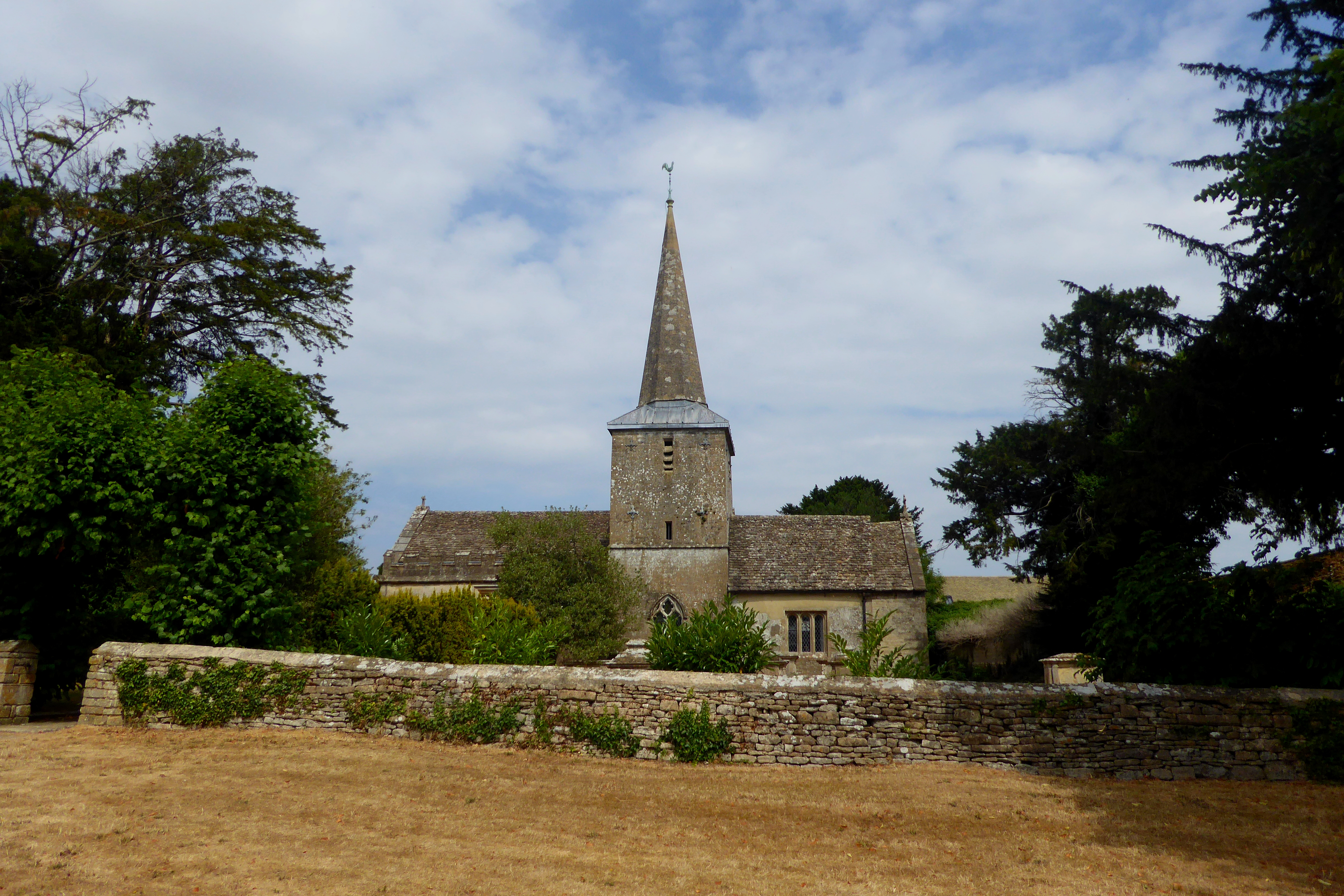
- Church of St Peter, Rodmarton

- Location within Gloucestershire
- Population: 333
- OS grid reference: ST941979
  - London: 85 mi (137 km)East
- Civil parish: Rodmarton
- District: Cotswold
- Shire county: Gloucestershire
- Region: South West
- Country: England
- Sovereign state: United Kingdom
- Post town: Cirencester
- Postcode district: GL7
- Dialling code: 01285
- Police: Gloucestershire
- Fire: Gloucestershire
- Ambulance: South Western
- UK Parliament: South Cotswolds

Rodmarton is a village and civil parish in Gloucestershire.

== History ==
Evidence of a Roman settlement has been found at Rodmarton. Through the parish runs a Roman trackway from Cirencester and Chavenage Green, adjacent to which is a long barrow. Roman roads such as the Fosse Way, Portway and the London Way run through or intersect near the parish. In 1636, a number of Roman coins and a tessellated pavement were discovered in the parish.

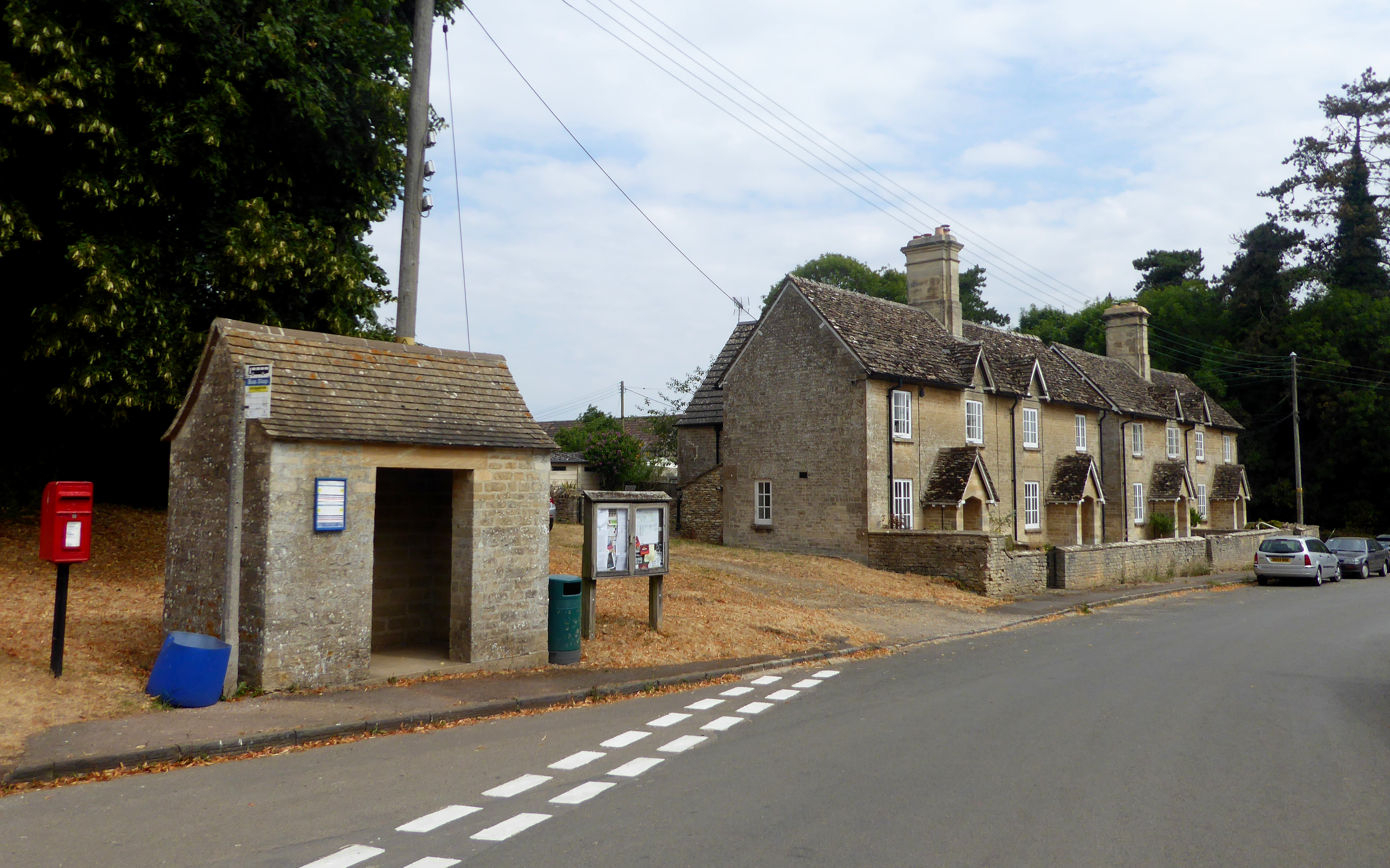
Bus stop and houses in Rodmarton

By the Domesday Survey in the late 11th century, the parish consisted of three tithings – Rodmarton, Culkerton, and Tarlton.

The nearby hamlet of Tarlton was home to the Arts and Crafts architect and designer Alfred Powell and his wife Louise from the 1920s to 1960. They built themselves a summer home and pottery studio where they designed pottery for Wedgwood and trained local workers in pottery painting.

== Geography ==
Rodmarton is situated approximately 4 miles (6.4 km) north-east of Tetbury and 6 miles (9.7 km) west of Cirencester, and is close to Gloucestershire's border with Wiltshire. The village's proximity to Wiltshire appears to give origin to part of the parish's name, as the Old English maer means "boundary".

=== Geology ===
The parish lies primarily on the Forest Marble Formation. The soil in the area ranges from a light loam to stony brash, and the quality of the bedrock led to a number of quarries being established in the area.

== Demography ==
=== Historical populations ===
According to statistics gathered during Charles I's reign, the parish had a population of 227, of whom 121 were male and 106 were female. By 1794, under the reign of George III, the population had grown by 82 to 309, of whom 152 were male and 157 were female. 38 parishioners were listed as being servants. At this 1794 survey, all the men in the village were employed in agriculture, and the women in spinning wool. Working children were listed as carders. The villagers' wages ranged from 6s to 9s per day, with salaries increasing during the harvest. The standard diet for a labourer was described as bread and cheese, "garden stuff" and dumplings for dinner, and tea for breakfast.

Sir Frederick Eden, 2nd Baronet's The State of the Poor (1797), details the following parochial records for Rodmarton:

Year	Baptisms			Burials			Marriages
Year	Male	Female	Total	Male	Female	Total	Marriages
1680	3	5	8	2	2	4	0
1685	5	5	10	2	1	3	2
1690	2	1	3	1	2	3	1
1691	1	1	2	0	3	3	0
1692	5	4	9	2	2	4	2
1693	1	1	2	2	2	4	3
1694	0	4	4	2	2	4	2
1695	3	1	4	4	7	11	2
1696	1	3	4	1	4	5	0
1697	4	3	7	3	2	5	2
1698	4	2	6	4	2	6	1
1699	2	2	4	1	3	4	4
1700	0	1	1	1	2	3	0
1720	0	3	3	2	2	4	2
1740	4	4	8	2	2	4	1
1760	3	3	6	2	2	4	1
1775	1	5	6	1	1	2	4
1776	9	1	10	1	4	5	1
1777	6	6	12	2	4	6	4
1778	7	4	11	3	3	6	9
1779	6	7	13	5	5	10	4
1780	7	7	14	6	4	10	1
1781	3	6	9	3	4	7	2
1782	3	6	9	0	4	4	0
1783	6	3	9	7	5	12	4
1784	5	9	14	2	2	4	2
1785	4	3	7	4	3	7	2
1786	4	6	10	8	4	12	1
1787	4	9	13	4	2	6	2
1788	6	7	13	0	8	8	7
1789	10	9	19	3	3	6	4
1790	4	9	13	3	4	7	1
1791	4	6	10	2	3	5	3
1792	9	4	13	3	2	5	2
1793	1	5	6	4	3	7	3
1794	3	3	6	2	3	5	0
1795	5	7	12	5	5	10	1

=== Present-day demographics ===
The 2001 United Kingdom census showed that of the 333 parishioners, 162 were male and 171 were female. Of the 163 residents aged between 16 and 64 who were in employment at the time of the census, the majority were classified as being in "managerial and professional occupations".
