= Nina Fagnani =

French painter

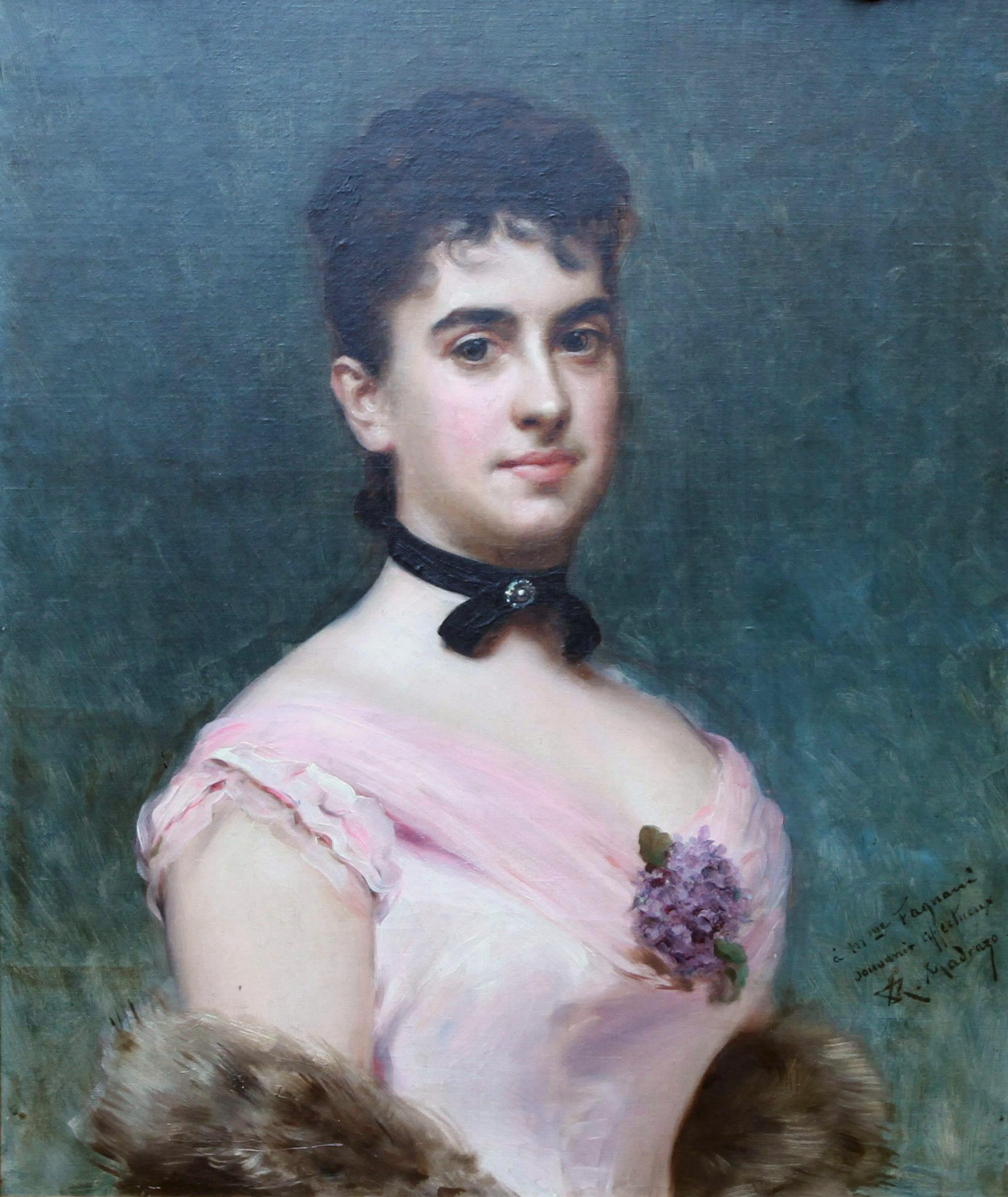
- Born: 1856
- Died: 1928 (aged 71–72)
- Known for: Painting

Nina Fagnani (1856–1928) was an American-born French painter of portrait miniatures.

Fagnani was the daughter of Italian-born painter Giuseppe Fagnani, who had emigrated to the United States in the company of Sir Henry Bulwer when he came to take up his post as British ambassador in 1849. He later became an American citizen and married, in 1851, Harriet Emma Everett Goodwin of Charlestown, Massachusetts. The couple took up residence in New York City, where Nina was born on September 24, 1856. Her artistic studies took place in Paris, where she worked with the widow of William Wyld, as well as with one Mme. Grec. She first exhibited at the Paris Salon of 1880, showing a Portrait of an Infant on enamel; she exhibited also at the Salons of 1890, 1895, 1896, and 1898, and in 1892 presented a work at the Royal Academy of Arts in London.

Fagnani was living in Paris in 1905. Her Portrait of Robert Stockwell Reynolds Hitt of 1893 was included in the inaugural exhibition of the National Museum of Women in the Arts, American Women Artists 1830-1930, in 1987. She died in Paris on August 12, 1928, and was interred at Mount Auburn Cemetery, Massachusetts.
