= Society for Italic Handwriting =

British organisation promoting italic handwriting

- Formation: 1952; 74 years ago
- Founder: Alfred Fairbank; James Wardrop
- Main organ: Writing Matters
- Website: www.italic-handwriting.org

The Society for Italic Handwriting (SIH) is a British organisation promoting the use of italic handwriting, and better and more legible handwriting in general. It was founded in 1952 by Alfred Fairbank and other members of the Society of Scribes & Illuminators.

The Scotsman wrote in 1956 that the society "did a good deal to rouse public interest and make “scribes” of ordinary or indifferent penmen".

== History ==
In 1954, the society's aims were said to be "to extend the use of cursive hands based on Renaissance models and to increase the pleasure and skill of its members in writing", and "to help teachers who would like their pupils to write an italic hand but are perplexed to know how best to make a beginning". Fairbank wrote of the society:

The member of the Society for Italic Handwriting, however, will regard [handwriting] from the point of view of the craftsman: it is to him a way of making and creating, and in his correspondence he finds through it the chance to express his aesthetic feelings. Those who cannot draw, but take pleasure in appearances, are afforded an inviting and welcome opportunity to add to the production of things that give visual satisfaction. Clarity and speed are obvious requirements, but how delightful to find that one can be a calligrapher and add grace to penmanship. Ordinary things are so often very ordinary, if not downright dreary, and contemporary works are frequently harsh and the expression of a heavy spirit. Now grace and delight are bidden to take part, if only in a commonplace activity.

The membership subscription in 1952 was ten shillings.

Teachers were particularly represented among members of the society in its early days.

A Scottish branch was started in 1957.

In 1955, Fairbank said that the society had 1400 members. In 1966 it was said to have members in 29 countries, with more than 400 members in America. In 1999 it had 500 members. In 2008 it had 300 members and as described as "growing fast".

Its archives are held at the Victoria and Albert Museum.

== Exhibitions ==
In 1958 it put on an exhibition in Copenhagen, using the work of children from Casterton Secondary School.

In 1959 it supplied samples for exhibitions in America. This was part of a project with the New Jersey Association of Art Teachers.

In 1965 the society put on an exhibition at Caldwell College.

In 1966 it held an exhibition at King's Lynn.

In 1977/78 it put on an exhibition, A Show of Hands, at the St Pancras Library, London, and then in 1979 at the Bodleian Library, Oxford.

== Activities ==
=== Education ===
The society has published educational resources, worksheets and examples of italic handwriting. In 2004 it was reported as wishing to support teachers working at Key Stage 1.

=== Awards ===
The society awards prizes for excellence in italic handwriting. In 1978 it ran an international competition with children's and adults' sections.

=== Journal ===
The society publishes a journal, which was originally called the Bulletin, later the Journal, by 1984 Signature, and from 2000 Writing Matters.

== Presidents ==
- Hugh Cholmondeley, 6th Marquess of Cholmondeley. He told schoolchildren "I'm sure that eventually - it may not be in my time, but it will be in your lives - this style will become the writing of the country, as it was in the days of Elizabeth I."
- Sybil Cholmondeley, Marchioness of Cholmondeley
- John Betjeman
- Humphrey Lyttelton, who wrote, "'Calligraphy is very much like music. To start with you have to do some work reproducing the correct shapes. Then you can improvise, so long as it is still based on the original'".
- Ewan Clayton

The first president of the Scottish branch was Eric Linklater.

== Chairs ==
- Joseph Compton, first chair
- Theodore McEvoy
- Patrick Nairne
- Foster Neville

== Notable members ==
- Patrick Barry (vice-president)
- Alec Clifton-Taylor (vice-president)
- Tom Gourdie (honorary life member)
- Anna Hornby (honorary secretary)
- Mark Francis Russell CBE (trustee)
- Marjorie Wise, teacher
