= Madelyn Walker =

English calligrapher and illuminator (1880–1970)

Madelyn Walker (1880–1970) was an English calligrapher and illuminator. One of the best-known calligraphers of the twentieth century, she produced illuminated and calligraphed manuscripts, especially of poetry.

== Life ==
She was born Ethel Madeline Walker in Ipswich on 3 January 1890 to draper James Walker and his wife Lizzie, née Mallett.

She studied at the Ipswich School of Art under George Rushton from 1903. After working as a pupil teacher, she won a scholarship to study at the Royal College of Art at South Kensington from 1911–3. She also studied with Edward Johnston and William Graily Hewitt. She then worked as an embroidery teacher at Sheffield College of Art and an art teacher at the London County Council School of Art at Hammersmith.

Walker served as Secretary on the inaugural committee of the Society of Scribes and Illuminators 1923–1928.

Hewitt, Walker, and one of her pupils, Ida Henstock, formed a workshop where they produced calligraphed and illuminated manuscripts including Shakespeare plays in the 1920s and 1930s. Walker also collaborated with Joan Kingsford on a manuscript of poetry by Catullus. She produced calligraphed versions of poetry by James Elroy Flecker, Robert Browning, and Alfred Noyes.

Walker joined the House of Prayer in Burnham-on-Sea in 1939. She died there on 2 November 1970.
