= Louise Powell =

Ada Louise Powell
- Born: 14 April 1865; Southwick, West Sussex, Sussex, England
- Died: 30 September 1956 (aged 91); London, England

Ada Louise Powell (née Lessore; March 1882 – 30 September 1956) was an English ceramics designer, calligrapher and painter. She is known for her contributions to Wedgwood and collaborating with her husband Alfred Hoare Powell.

== Early and personal life ==
Her illustrious family included her grandfather Émile Lessore, a free hand designer for Wedgwood, and her sister Thérèse Lessore. Her father, Jules Lessore, also decorated pottery but was primarily a marine painter, he had exhibitions at the Royal Academy and Paris Salon. Powell studied calligraphy at the Central School of Arts and Crafts. "She became highly skilled and well known, illuminating some of William Morris’ incomplete work, and extending her interests to decorative designs and the painting of furniture for Ernest Grimson". Ada thus had historical family connections to the arts and to Wedgwood, however after her father died in 1892 her progression in the arts was perhaps more indebted to the encouragement and aligned interests of her mother and siblings. Her sister, Thérèse Lessore, was a painter and founder member of the London Group and who decorated Wedgwood blanks in the 1920s and her brother Frederick was a portrait sculptor who opened the Beaux Arts Gallery. Ada Louise married Alfred Hoare Powell on Thursday, 6 September 1906 and, in their ceramic works, they developed an artistic partnership.

== Career ==
After her marriage to Powell, the couple pursued a career with Wedgwood together after setting up their studio in 1907 at 20 Red Lion Square in Bloomsbury, London. Wedgwood sought to offer a new product range which, after its success, lead to the couple receiving money towards a studio to work, two assistants in London and a studio in the Wedgwood factory. Their brief was to developed the art wares within the company. Their progressive style was sought by the company to mass-produce works which coincided with the Arts and Crafts movement. Some of their work was jointly signed however a lot of her work was individual as she preferred calligraphic and heraldic motifs. The couple were well known in the field of the arts and exhibited in many events such as: Arts and Crafts Exhibition at Grafton Galleries, 1906; Hampstead Exhibition, 1914; Decorative Arts of Great Britain and Ireland Exhibition at the Louvre, 1914; the Paris Exhibition, 1925 as well as yearly in their studio.

Powell suggested the reintroduction of classic eighteenth century designs into a new Wedgwood collection hosted in Liverpool, which led to a lot of external approval and proved to be a commercial success, with the Staffordshire Sentinel commenting on their 'fresh style of decorated pottery'. The patterns included; 'Vine', 'Oak Leaf', and 'Crimped Ribbon and Wreath' and were sold to famous retailers such as Dunbar Hay and Harrods. Most of her designs were hand painted and a lot of her patterns were derived from nature in a calligraphic fashion. Some of her designs were extremely complex and required modification by the art director at the time but were critically acclaimed by many.
