= Sidney Greenslade =

British architect

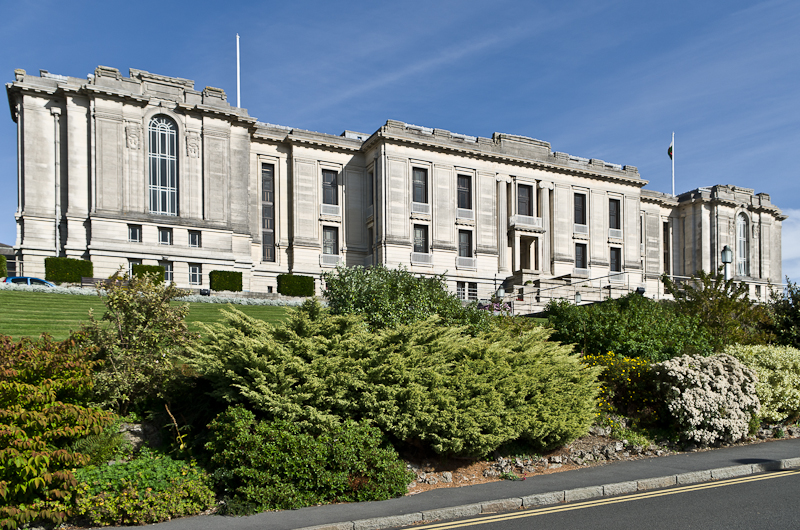
West facade of the National Library of Wales designed by Greenslade.

Sidney Kyffin Greenslade (4 September 1866–25 February 1955), born in Exeter, was the first architect of the National Library of Wales, located in Aberystwyth. While he was working on the building, he was approached by the Davies sisters of Gregynog to become curator of the University College of Wales's Arts and Craft Museum.
