= Anna Hornby =

English painter (1914–1996)

Anna Hornby (6 April 1914 – 1996) was an English painter, calligrapher and member of the New English Art Club.

== Life and work ==
Anna Hornby was educated at the independent Westonbirt School, Gloucestershire. She went on to study art in Florence with landscape and flower painter Aubrey Waterfield in 1934, and later that year enrolled at the Byam Shaw School of Art in London where she studied under Francis Ernest Jackson, graduating in 1940.

In 1952 Hornby was appointed Honorary Secretary of the Society for Italic Handwriting, a post she held until 1962. Through her interest in calligraphy and her association with the Society, Hornby became acquainted with Alfred John Fairbank, whose portrait she painted (exhibited at the Royal Academy in 1961). Fairbank was a founding member of the Society of Scribes and Illuminators in 1921, and was also involved in the foundation of the Society for Italic Handwriting in 1952.

Hornby was also a member of the Art Workers Guild and was elected member of the New English Art Club in 1971. She exhibited widely with 13 pictures at the Royal Academy. In addition she exhibited with the Royal Society of Painters in Watercolours, The Royal Society of Portrait Painters and the Royal Society of British Artists.

Anna Hornby died in 1996, bequeathing paintings by Peter Greenham and Francis Ernest Jackson to the Ashmolean Museum of Art, Oxford. Many of her papers and letters, including correspondence with Alfred John Fairbank are held in the archives of the Bodleian Library, University of Oxford and the National Art Library, London.

== Exhibitions ==
Pictures exhibited at the Royal Academy, London

- 1949 – Chantmarle
- 1959 – Cecily
- 1960 – Farm near Urbino
- 1960 – Mary
- 1961 – Evening Tuscany
- 1961 – Sally
- 1961 – Alfred Fairbank Esq
- 1963 – Le Buis: Morning
- 1967 – Washing Line
- 1968 – Crocuses
- 1968 – Italian Haystacks
- 1969 – College Dustbins
- 1970 – Certaldo in the Rain
