= Thérèse Lessore =

English painter (1884–1945)

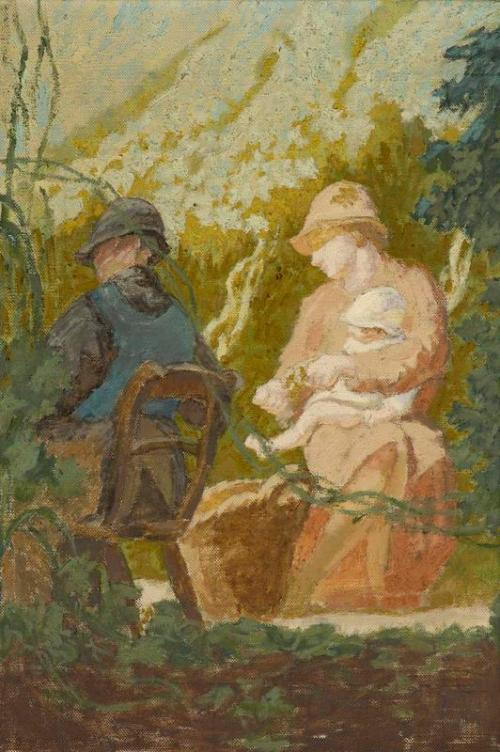
The Days Work - Hop Picking, oil on canvas, Aberdeen Art Gallery

Thérèse Lessore (5 July 1884 – 10 December 1945) was a British artist who worked in oil and watercolour. She was a founder member of the London Group, and the third wife of Walter Sickert.

== Biography ==
Lessore was born in Southwick, West Sussex. Her parents were the French painter Jules Lessore (1849–1892), who had lived in England since 1871, and his wife Ada Louise Cooper. Her grandfather was Émile Lessore (1805–1876), a French ceramic artist and painter who had designed and decorated Wedgwood pottery from the 1860s onward. Her brother, Frederick Lessore, was a sculptor who founded and ran the Beaux Arts Gallery in London, and her elder sister Louise Powell (1865–1956), was a Wedgwood pottery designer.

Thérèse Lessore attended the Slade School of Fine Art from 1904 to 1909. In her final year she was awarded the Melvill Nettleship Prize for Figure Composition.

She exhibited with the Allied Artists Association in 1912, and was associated with the Camden Town Group which gathered around Walter Sickert from 1911 to 1913. In 1913 she was a founder member of the London Group, which combined the members of the Camden Town Group and the Vorticists. She had her first solo exhibition of painting at the Eldar Gallery in London in 1918. Sickert contributed the exhibition catalogue's preface, in which he praised her "sense of design, her spare style, and her technical skill in extracting value from the interplay of coloured underpaintings and final coats of local colour". She had her first solo watercolour show in 1926.

In 1931, The Times's review of a watercolour exhibition by Lessore noted her "serene" portrayal of subjects ranging from "children playing in London parks" to "people at the circus or theatre, Sussex fishermen, and a few pure landscapes", concluding that she possessed a "rare talent happily employed". She designed and painted pottery for Wedgwood. Her work for the company showed the influence of the Bloomsbury Group artists Vanessa Bell and Duncan Grant in its "loosely handled paint and formal abstraction".

Lessore married the painter Bernard Adeney in 1909; they were divorced in 1921. Lessore married Walter Sickert on 4 June 1926, becoming his third wife. Sickert died in 1942. Lessore died in London on 10 December 1945, aged 61.

== Gallery ==
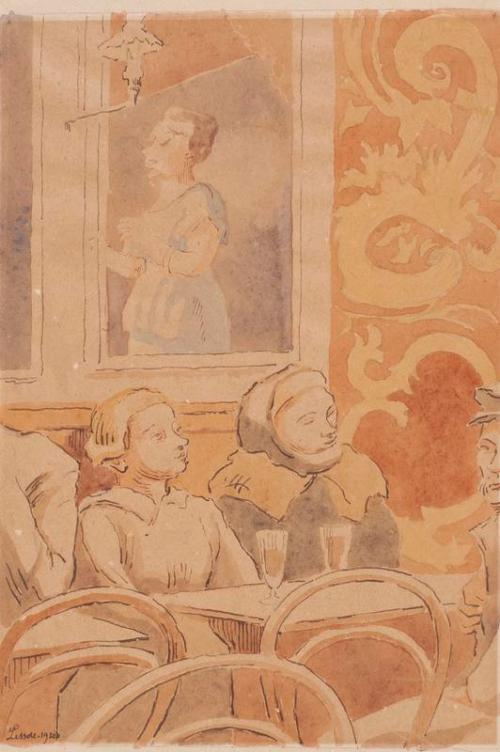
Bruges - Café Chantant (1920), Aberdeen Art Gallery

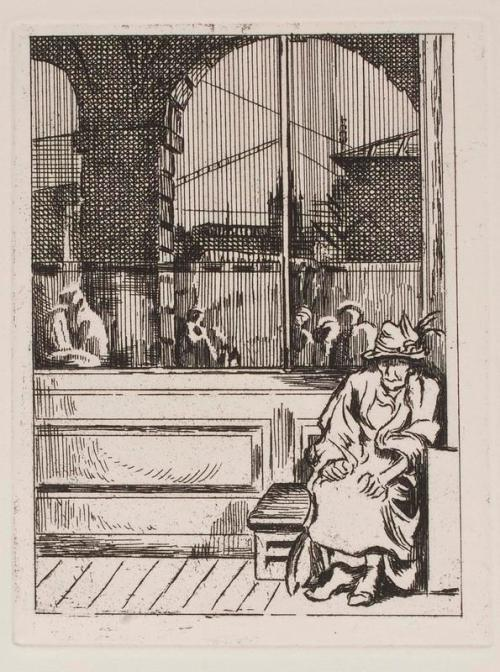
Old Woman, Aberdeen Art Gallery
