= Bernard Adeney =

English painter and textile designer (1878–1966)

- Born: 2 August 1878; London, England
- Died: 4 April 1966 (aged 87)
- Education: Royal Academy of Arts; Académie Julian; Slade School of Fine Art
- Known for: Painting and textile design
- Spouses: Thérèse Lessore (m. 1909–1921); Noël Gilford Adeney

Bernard Adeney (2 August 1878 – 4 April 1966) was an English painter and textile designer. He was a founding member of the London Group, an artists' exhibiting society, and was its president from 1921 to 1923. Between 1930 and 1947, he was head of the textile school at the Central Saint Martins College of Art and Design, where he had taught since 1903. One of his most notable works is the painting Toy Sailing Boats (1911), which formed part of a seven-piece collection of panels painted for Borough Polytechnic under the direction of Roger Fry. Other works include Edge of a Wood, Barley Fields, West Wittering, Pond and Trees, Farm Buildings and The Parade, Cowes.

Adeney was born on 2 August 1878 in London, the son of Canon W. F. Adeney. He started his art training in St John's Wood Art School when only nine years old, He then studied at the Royal Academy, the Académie Julian in Paris and later the Slade School of Fine Art. He married the painter Thérèse Lessore in 1909 and they were divorced in 1921. He subsequently married fellow painter Noël Gilford.
