= Émile Lessore =

French painter

Emile Lessore
- Born: 1805; Paris
- Died: 1876 (aged 70–71); Marlotte
- Known for: Oils, water colors, ceramics

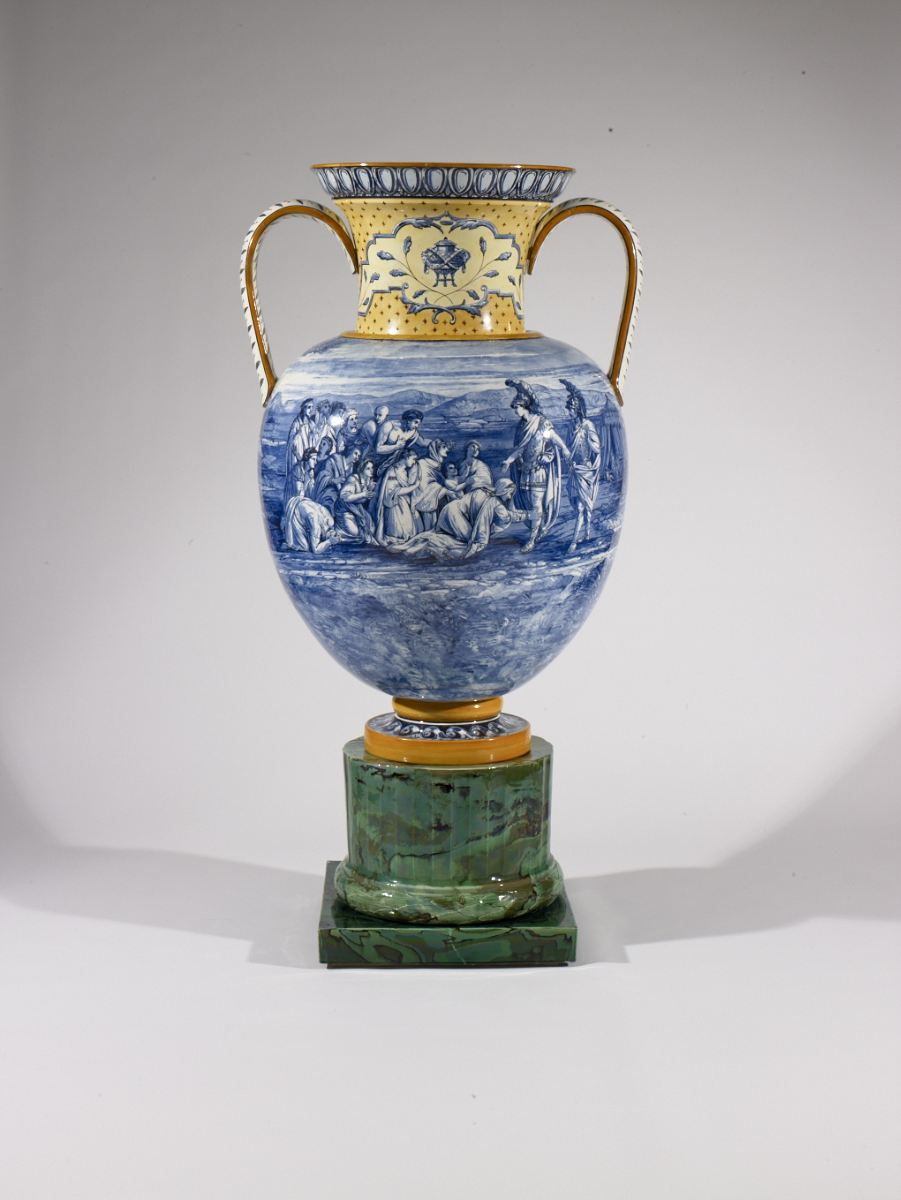
Vase, one of a pair produced by the Wedgwood Factory and painted by Lessore with Henry Brownsword. At 59 1/2x30x29 inches, it is one of the largest pieces ever produced by Wedgwood. This vase resides at the Birmingham Museum of Art, while its mate is located at the Wedgwood Museum in England.

Émile-Aubert Lessore or Lessorre (1805 in Paris – 1876 in Marlotte) was a French ceramic artist and painter.

== Life ==
He originally worked in oil and water colors, but expanded into ceramic art. His ceramics work received a variety of medals, including his 1862 exhibition in London, 1867 exhibition in Paris, and 1873 exhibit in Vienna. Known for his subdued and delicate coloring, Lessore is said to have led a revolution in the decoration of pottery.

Emile painted a variety of ceramic pieces, many for the Wedgwood pottery company. Some scenes painted on the ceramic pieces are from other works.

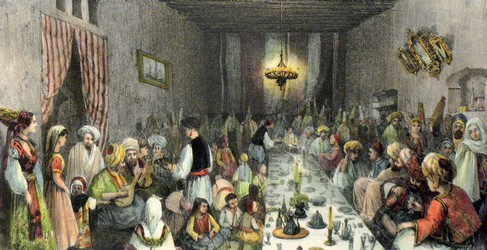
Jewish Feast in Algeria, from his 1835 book

Lessore first studied under Jean Auguste Dominique Ingres, which led to his first exhibit in the Paris Salon at age 26. At that time, it was unusual for someone so young to have a painting exhibit in official art exhibition of the Académie des Beaux-Arts. Over the next twenty years, his paintings sold well. In 1835 he published, with William Wyld, Voyage pittoresque dans la Régence d’Alger (Paris, Charles Motte, 1835).

In 1851, Lessore began his ceramics work in Sèvres, a southwestern suburb of Paris, France known for its porcelain manufacture. Lessore tapped into his artistic painting experience to produce a pair of large, decorated vases. These were purchased in 1853 by the Emperor of Russia for 1,000 guineas ($5,145).

Lessore's unique artistic expression did not fit well with the techniques of the other artists in Sèvres and by 1858 Lessore had moved to England to work for English potter Thomas Minton. Lessore then moved to Etruria, Staffordshire, where he worked for the famous firm of Wedgwood. Lessore exhibits were well received and he received personal exhibition medals in London (1862), Paris (1867), and Vienna (1873).

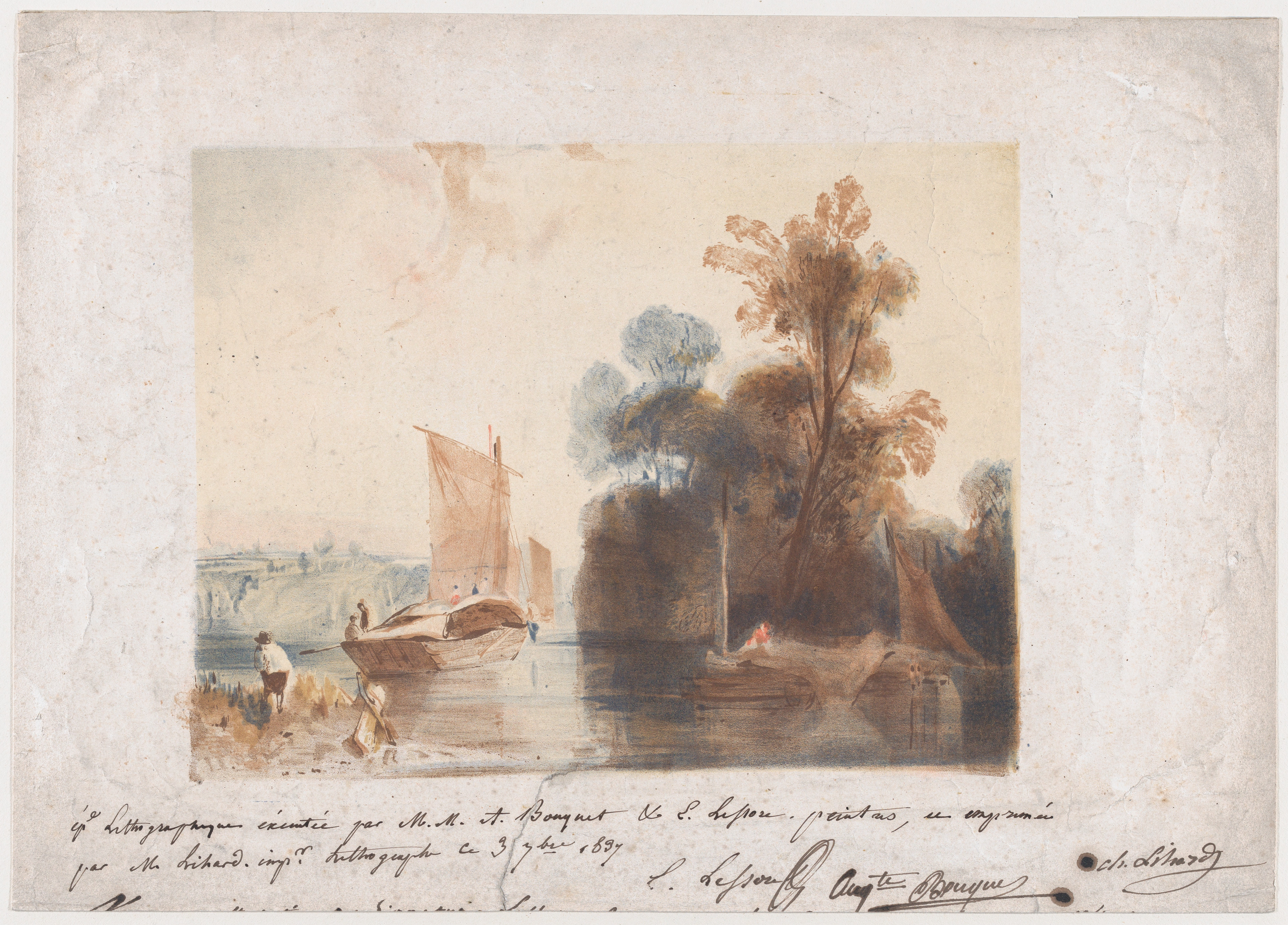
Lithograph, with Auguste Bouquet, 1837

At age 68, Lessore moved back to Paris to continue his work with ceramics in Fontainebleau but maintained contact with Wedgwood. Lessore died in 1876 at the age of 71.
